= Perth =

Capital city of Western Australia

Perth Boorloo (Nyungar)
- City
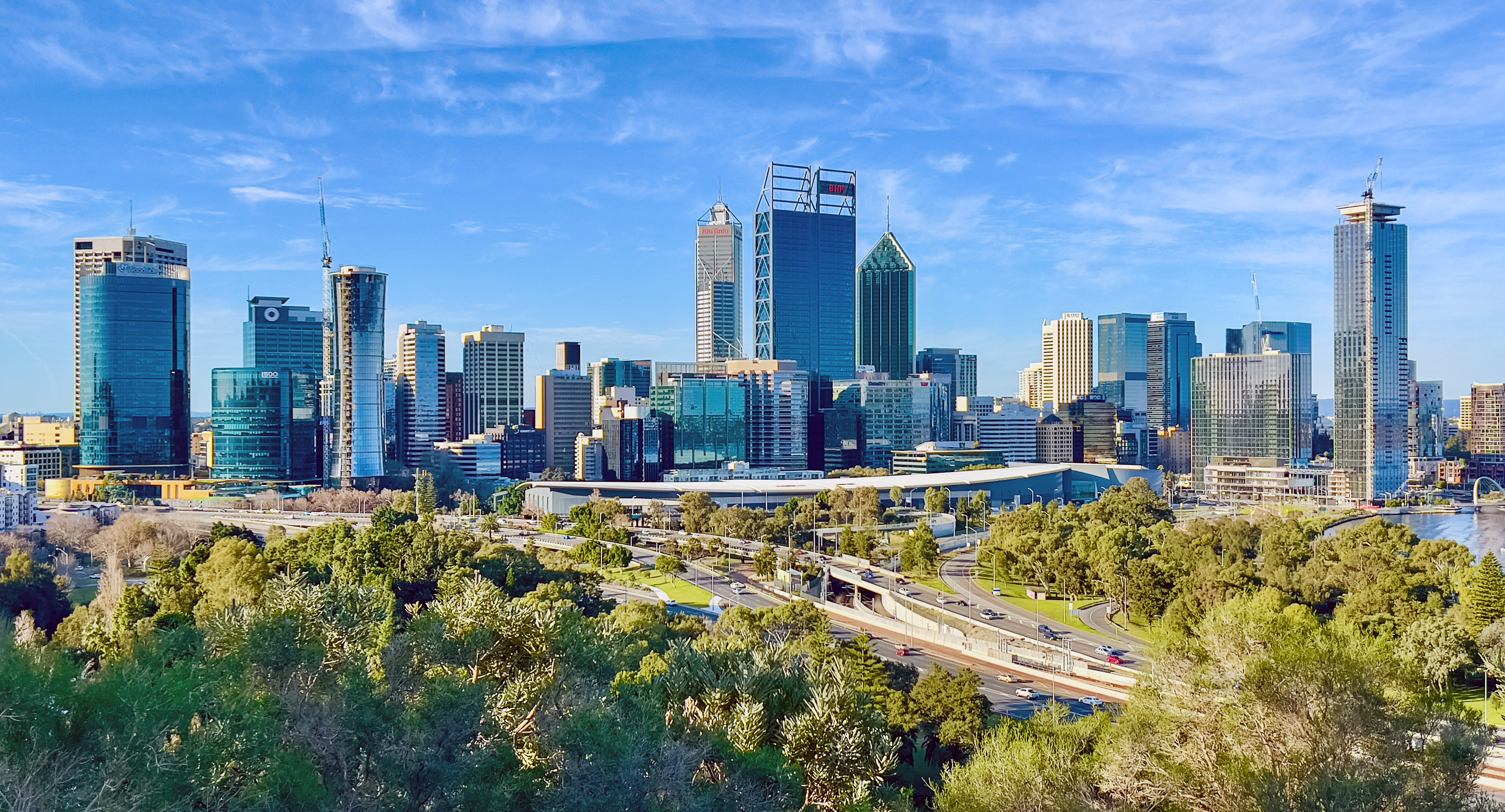
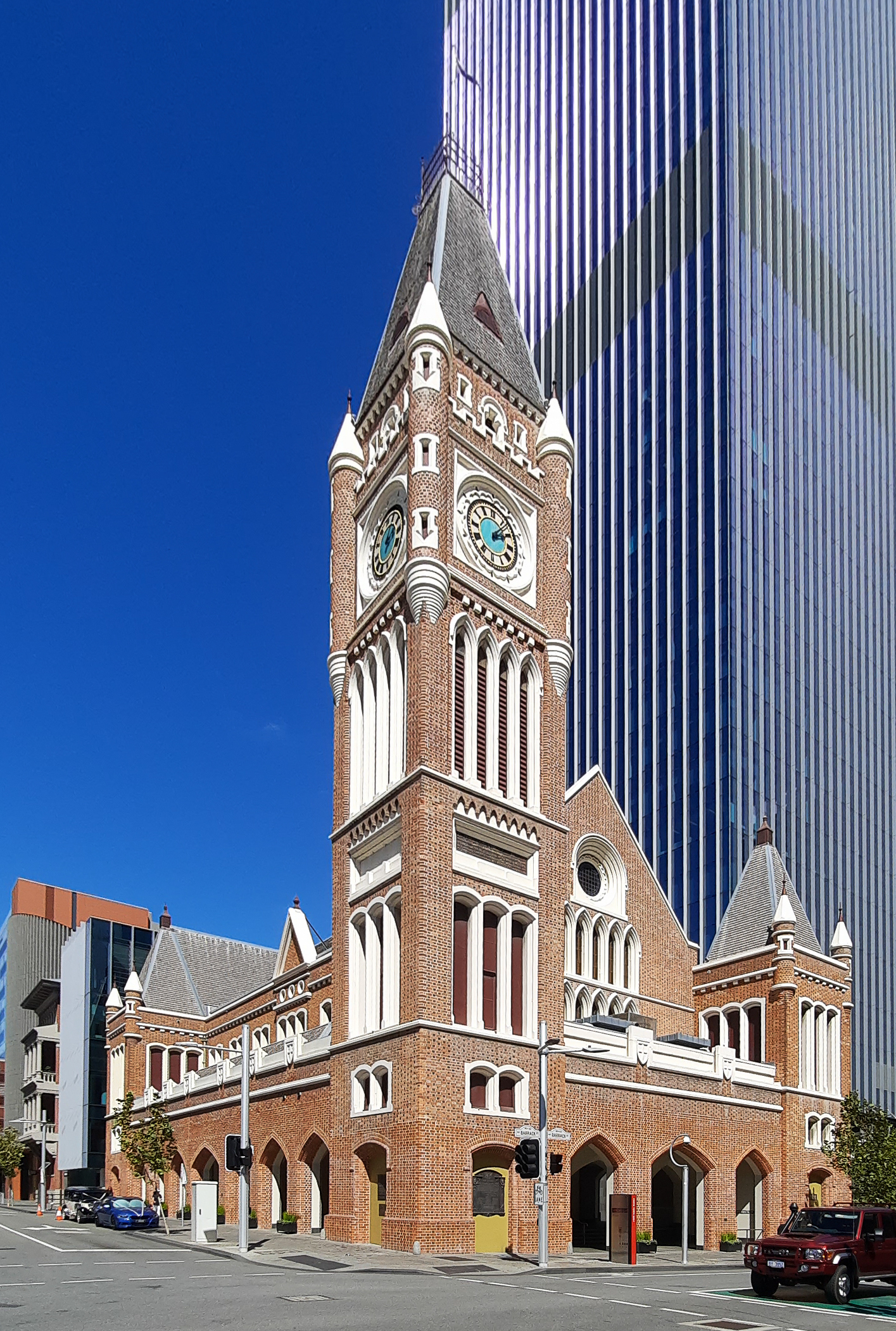
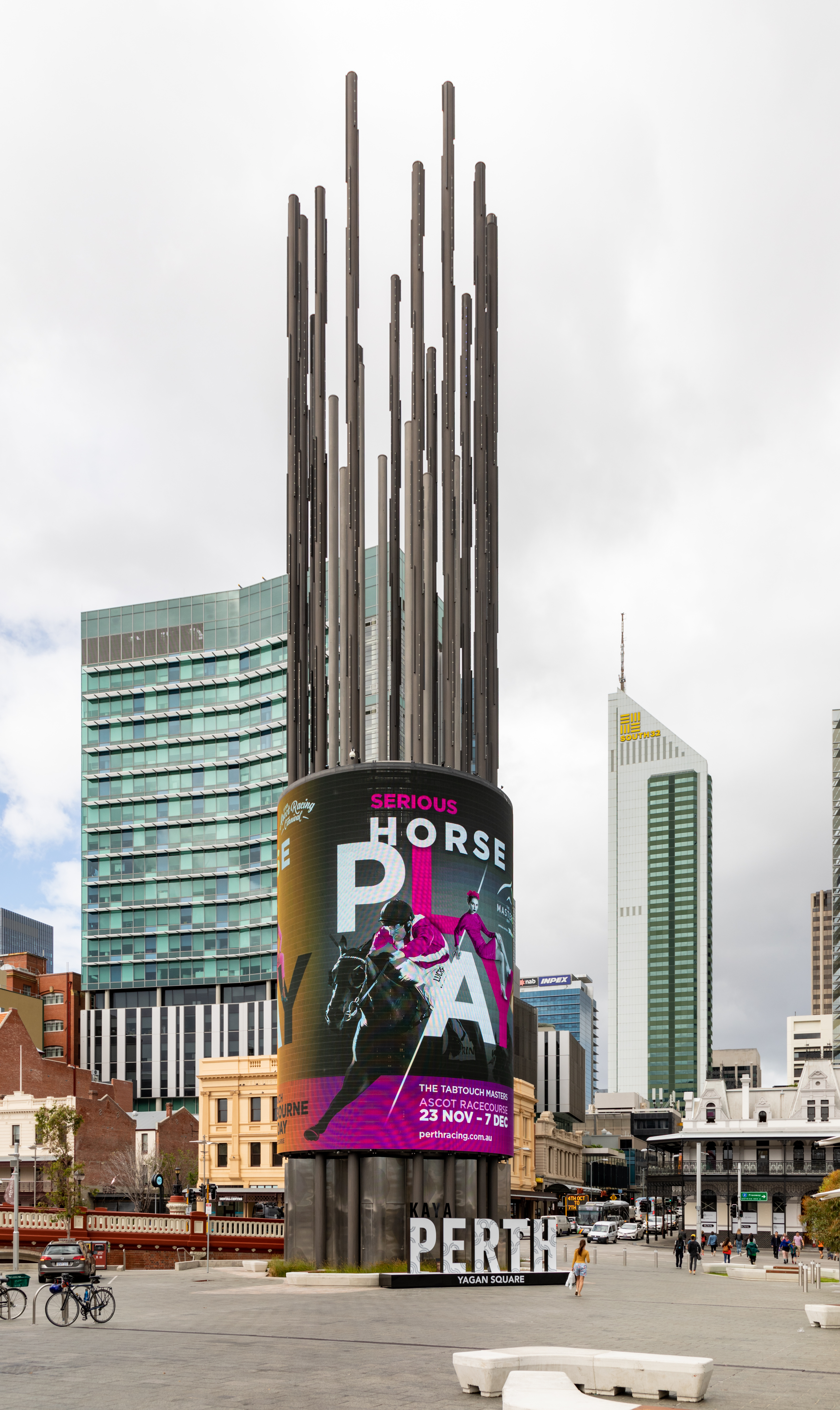
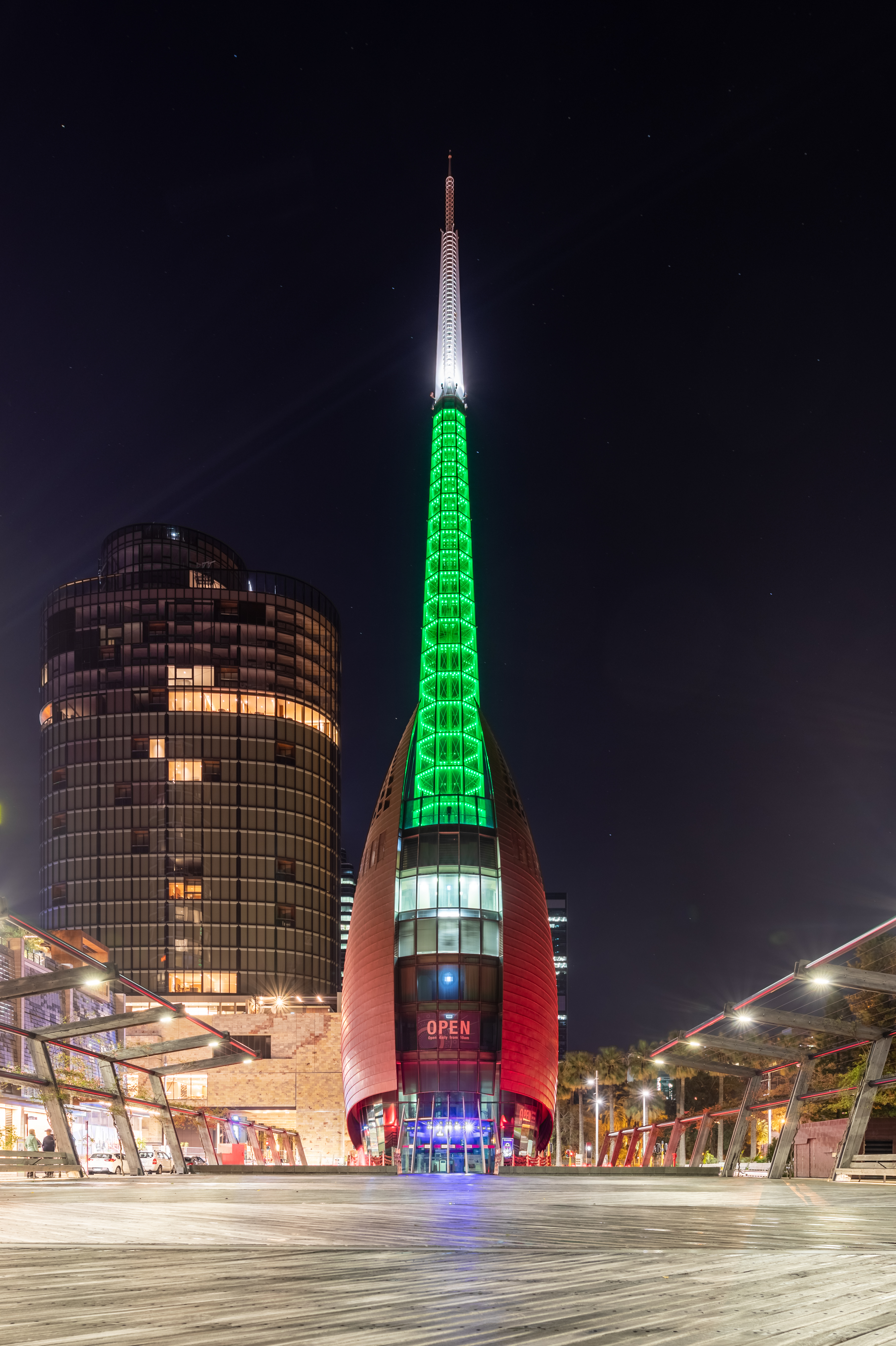
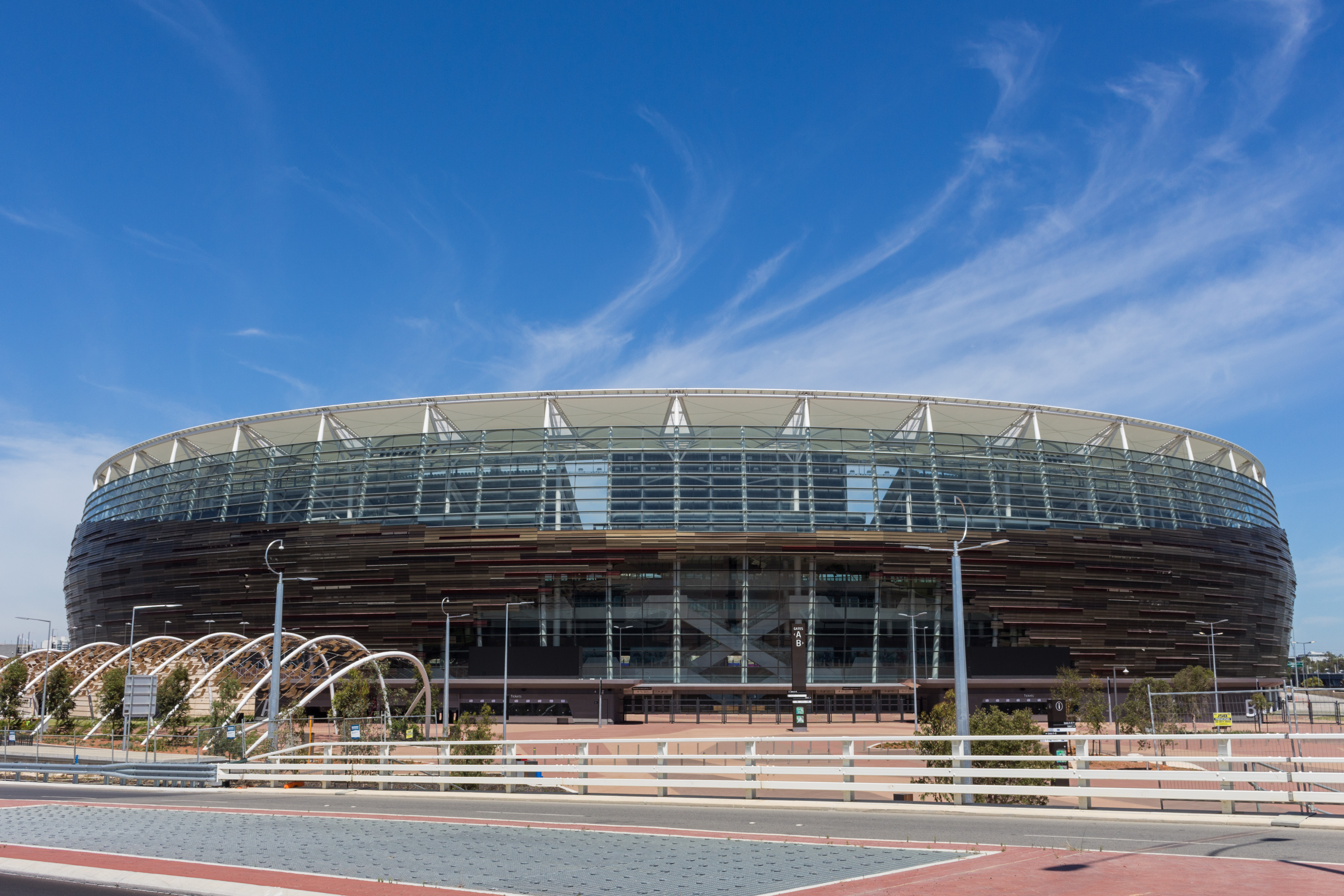
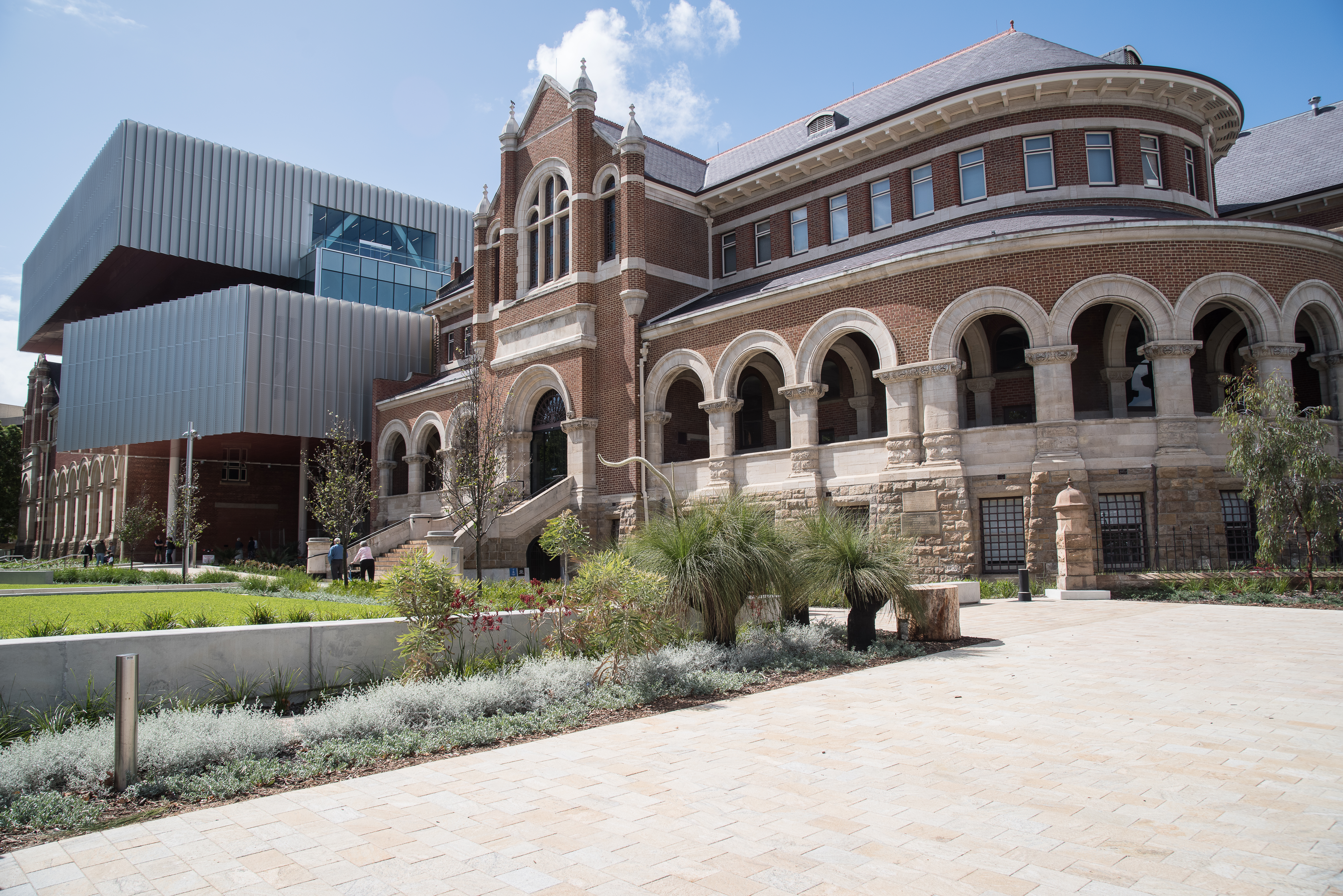
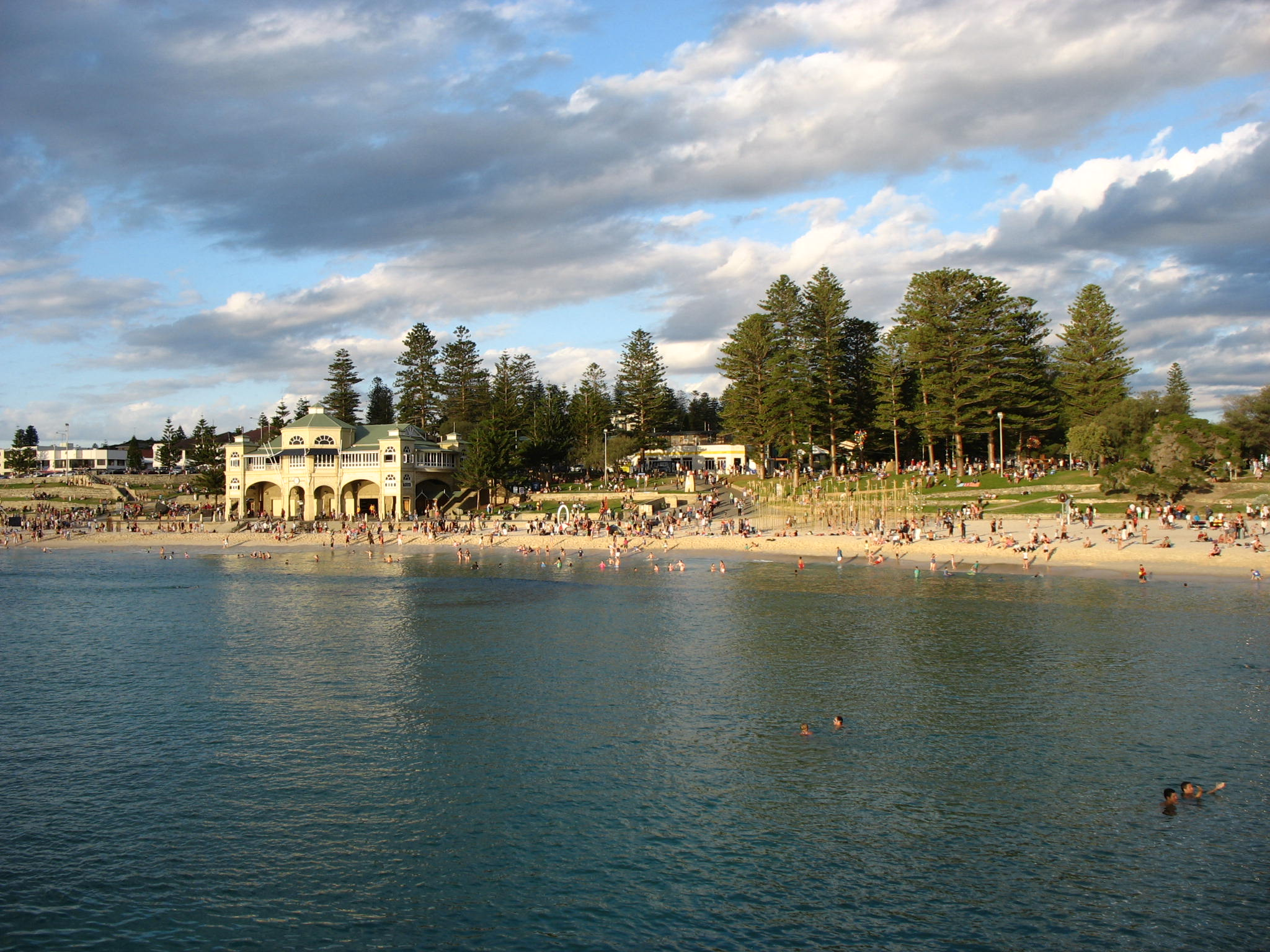
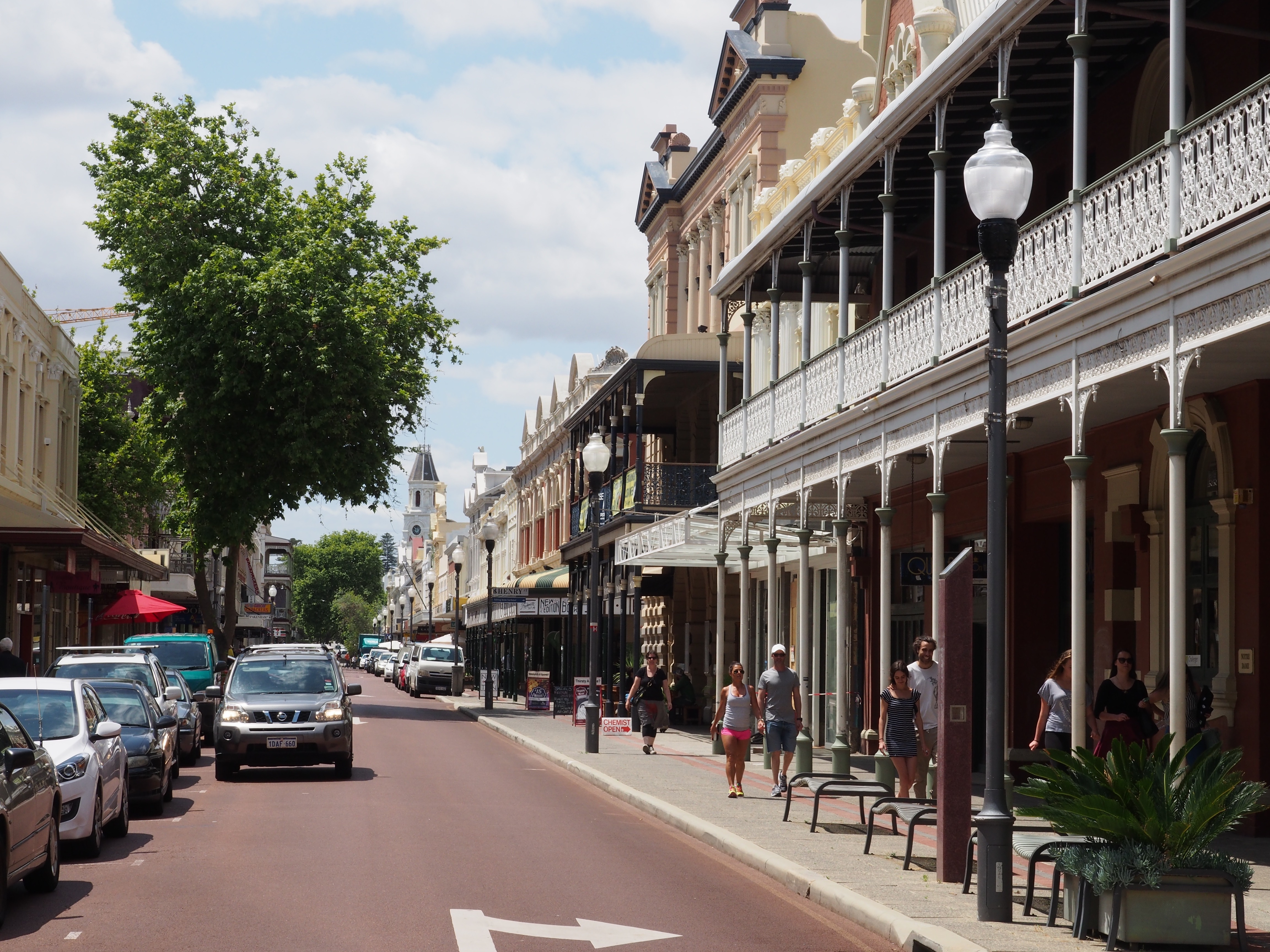
- Skyline of Perth from Kings Park Perth Town Hall Yagan Square Swan Bells Perth Stadium WA Museum Boola Bardip Cottesloe Beach Historic district of Fremantle

- Interactive map of Perth
- Coordinates: 32°00′S 115°54′E
- Country: Australia
- State: Western Australia
- Location: 2,607 km (1,620 mi) west of Adelaide; 4,238 km (2,633 mi) WSW of Brisbane; 3,337 km (2,074 mi) NW of Melbourne; 3,632 km (2,257 mi) WNW of Canberra; 3,845 km (2,389 mi) west of Sydney
- Established: 4 June 1829; 197 years ago

Government
  - State electorate: Perth (and 41 others)
  - Federal division: Perth (and 11 others)

Area (GCCSA)
  - Total: 6,417.9 km^{2} (2,478.0 sq mi)

Population
  - Total: City: 2,281,385 Greater Perth: 2,384,371 (2024) (4th)
  - Density: 372/km^{2} (960/sq mi)

GDP (nominal)
  - Total: A$146.88 billion (2019) (US$105.05 billion)
  - Per capita: A$70,300 (2019) (US$50,278.93)
- Time zone: UTC+08:00 (AWST)
- Mean max temp: 24.8 °C (76.6 °F)
- Mean min temp: 12.8 °C (55.0 °F)
- Annual rainfall: 731.1 mm (28.78 in)

Perth (Nyungar: Boorloo) is the capital and largest city of the state of Western Australia. It is the fourth-most-populous city in Australia, with a population of over 2.2 million in the city and 2.3 million within Greater Perth as of 2023. The world's most isolated city by certain criteria, Perth is part of the South West Land Division of Western Australia, with most of Perth's metropolitan area on the Swan Coastal Plain between the Indian Ocean and the Darling Scarp. The city has expanded outward from the original British settlements on the Swan River, upon which its central business district and port of Fremantle are situated.

Perth was founded by Captain James Stirling in 1829 as the administrative centre of the Swan River Colony. The city is situated on the traditional lands of the Whadjuk Noongar people, where Aboriginal Australians have lived for at least 48,000 years. Initially established as a free settlement, the colony accepted transported convicts from 1850 to supply labour for public works and construction. Perth was named after the city of Perth in Scotland, being proclaimed as a city by Queen Victoria in 1856. During the late 20th and early 21st centuries, a series of mining booms in various regions of Western Australia propelled Perth into the role of the regional headquarters for significant mining operations. It became Australia's fourth-most populated city in 1984.

Perth was classified by the Globalization and World Cities Research Network as a Beta global city in 2020. As of 2021, Perth is divided into 30 local government areas, comprising over 350 suburbs. The metropolitan contours span 125 kilometres (78 mi) from Two Rocks in the north to Singleton in the south, and 45 kilometres (28 mi) from the west coast to Sawyers Valley in the east. Mandurah, Western Australia's second-largest city, forms a conurbation with Perth along the coastline, however is still generally regarded as an independent city.

Perth is home to many parkland areas and nature reserves, the most-visited being Kings Park and Botanic Garden, one of the world's largest inner-city parks. Other popular natural features include Cottesloe Beach and Rottnest Island. Notable heritage buildings and cultural sites include Perth Mint, WA Museum Boola Bardip and the World Heritage-listed Fremantle Prison. All five of Western Australia's universities are based in Perth. The city is served by Fremantle Harbour and Perth Airport.

== Toponymy ==
The name of the city is taken from Perth, Scotland, in honour of the Secretary of State for War and the Colonies, and Member for Perthshire in the British House of Commons, George Murray. Murray's association with the city was included in Stirling's proclamation of the colony, read in Fremantle on 18 June 1829, which concluded with the statement, "Given under my hand and Seal at Perth this 18th Day of June 1829. James Stirling Lieutenant Governor". The only contemporary information on the source of the name comes from Charles Fremantle's diary entry for 12 August 1829, which records that they "named the town Perth according to the wishes of Sir George Murray".

Similarly to the English name Perth, the Noongar name Boorloo is sometimes used to denote the Perth central business district area, the City of Perth local government area, or the capital city Perth in general. Use of this term has gained traction in the arts, by Tourism Western Australia (the statutory authority responsible for promoting Western Australia as a tourist destination), the University of Western Australia, Curtin University, the City of Perth, journalists for the Australian Broadcasting Corporation and National Geographic, and has been promoted by state politicians such as Roger Cook and two of his ministers, deputy premier Rita Saffioti and John Carey. The name Boorloo was initially recorded by Robert Menli Lyon as Boorlo in 1833, which was interpreted as "Perth, properly Point Fraser" (a location in what was established in 1954 as East Perth), with the area around Point Fraser traditionally known to the Whadjuk Noongar people as Boodjargabbeelup.

== History ==
=== Prehistory ===
Perth is located on the traditional land of the Whadjuk people, one of several groups in south-western Western Australia that make up the Noongar people.

Archaeological evidence attests to human habitation in the Perth area for at least 48,000 years; according to Noongar tradition, they have occupied the area since "time immemorial". Noongar country encompasses the south-west corner of Western Australia, with particular significance attached to the wetlands on the Swan Coastal Plain, both spiritually (featuring in local mythology) and as a source of food.

The current central business district location is within the traditional territory of the Mooro, a Noongar clan, led by Yellagonga at the time of the British settlement. The Mooro was one of several Noongar clans based around the Swan River, known collectively as the Whadjuk. The Whadjuk themselves were one of a larger group of fourteen tribes that formed the south-west socio-linguistic block known as the Noongar (meaning 'the people' in their language), also sometimes called the Bibbulmun.

On 19 September 2006, the Federal Court of Australia ruled in the case of Bennell v State of Western Australia [2006] FCA 1243 that Noongar native title persisted over Perth metropolitan area. An appeal was subsequently filed, and in 2008, the Full Court of the Federal Court upheld parts of the appeal by the Western Australian and Commonwealth governments. Following this appeal, the Western Australian Government and the South West Aboriginal Land and Sea Council negotiated the South West Native Title Settlement. This settlement, including the Whadjuk Indigenous Land Use Agreement over the Perth region, was finalised by the Federal Court on 1 December 2021. As part of this agreement, the Noongar (Koorah, Nitja, Boordahwan) (Past, Present, Future) Recognition Act was passed in 2016, officially recognising the Noongar people as the traditional owners of the south-west region of Western Australia.

=== European exploration ===
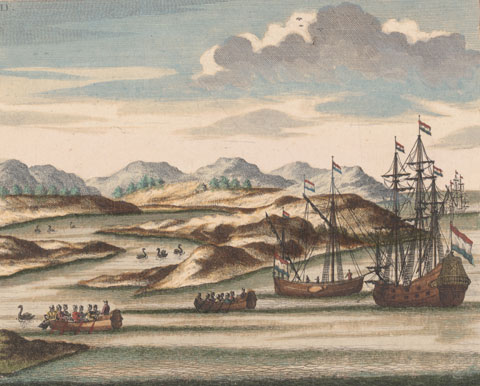
Willem de Vlamingh's ships and black swans at the entrance to the Swan River, 1697

In 1619 the Dutch explorer Frederick de Houtman, sailing in the VOC ship Dordrecht, with Councillor of the Indies Jacob Dedel in the VOC ship Amsterdam, sighted the Australian coast near present-day Perth, which they called Dedelsland. Many more boats followed in the ensuing years (an estimated 54 European ships prior to 1770 from a range of nations).

On 10 January 1697, Dutch Captain Willem de Vlamingh conducted the first documented exploration of the present-day Perth region. His crew initially explored the area on foot, leading them to what is now central Perth. Vlamingh's expedition also ventured far up the Swan River, in search of native inhabitants. They named the river Swarte Swaene-Revier, a reference to the black swans prevalent in the region. After Vlamingh's expedition, other Europeans conducted further voyages of exploration in the period between 1697 and 1829. However, as with Vlamingh's assessments, they judged the area inhospitable and unsuitable for the agriculture necessary to sustain a European-style settlement.

=== Swan River Colony ===
Despite the Colony of New South Wales establishing a convict-supported settlement at King George's Sound (called Frederick Town, renamed to Albany upon becoming part of Western Australia) on the south coast of the continent in 1826, responding to rumours of potential French annexation, Perth marked the first comprehensive European settlement in the western portion of the continent in 1829. Officially designated as Western Australia in 1832, the colony retained the informal moniker "Swan River Colony" for many years, after the area's major watercourse.

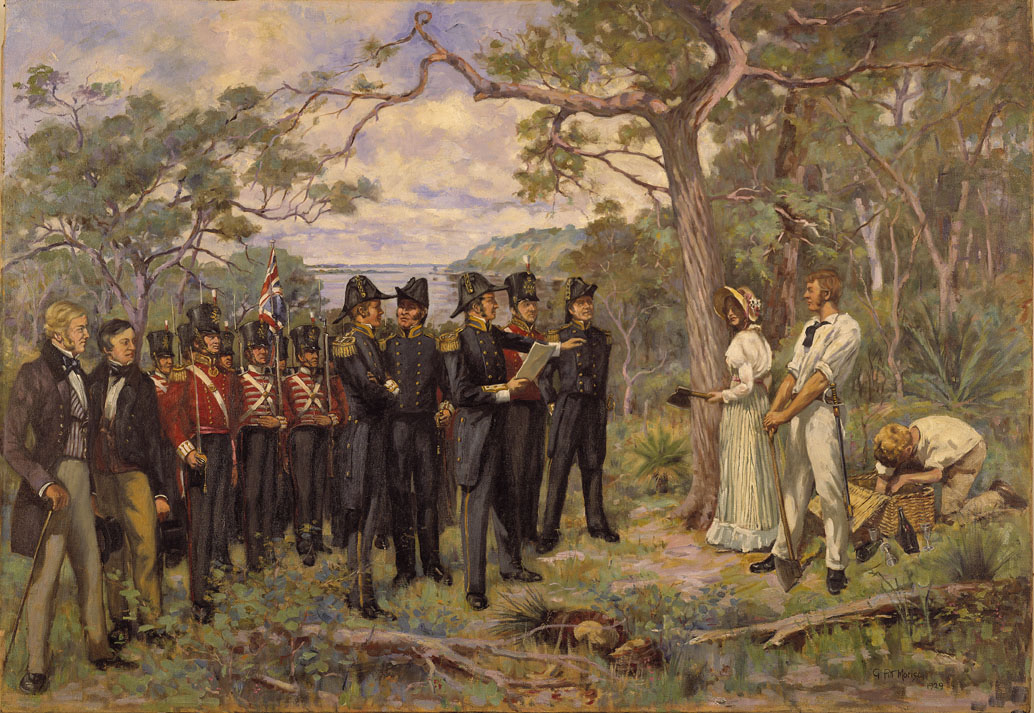
The Foundation of Perth 1829 by George Pitt Morison is a historical reconstruction of the official ceremony by which Perth was founded, although not everyone depicted may have actually been present.

On 4 June 1829, newly arriving British colonists had their first view of the mainland. Captain James Stirling, aboard Parmelia, noted that the site was "as beautiful as anything of this kind I had ever witnessed". On 12 August that year, Helen Dance, wife of the captain of the second ship, Sulphur, felled a tree to commemorate the town's founding. From 1831 onward, confrontations between British settlers and the Noongar people escalated due to conflicting land-value systems and increased land use as the colony expanded. These confrontations resulted in multiple events, including the murder of settlers (such as Thomas Peel's servant Hugh Nesbitt), the execution without trial of Whadjuk elder Midgegooroo, the killing of his son Yagan in 1833, and the Pinjarra massacre in 1834.

The strained relations between the Noongar people and the Europeans arose due to these events. Agricultural development on the land restricted the traditional hunter-gatherer practices of the native Whadjuk Noongar, compelling them to camp in designated areas, including swamps and lakes north of the European settlement. Third Swamp, known to them as Boodjamooling, remained a primary campsite for the remaining Noongar people in the Perth region, also accommodating travellers, itinerants, and homeless individuals. During the gold rush in the 1890s, miners on their way to the goldfields joined this community.

=== Convict era and gold rushes ===
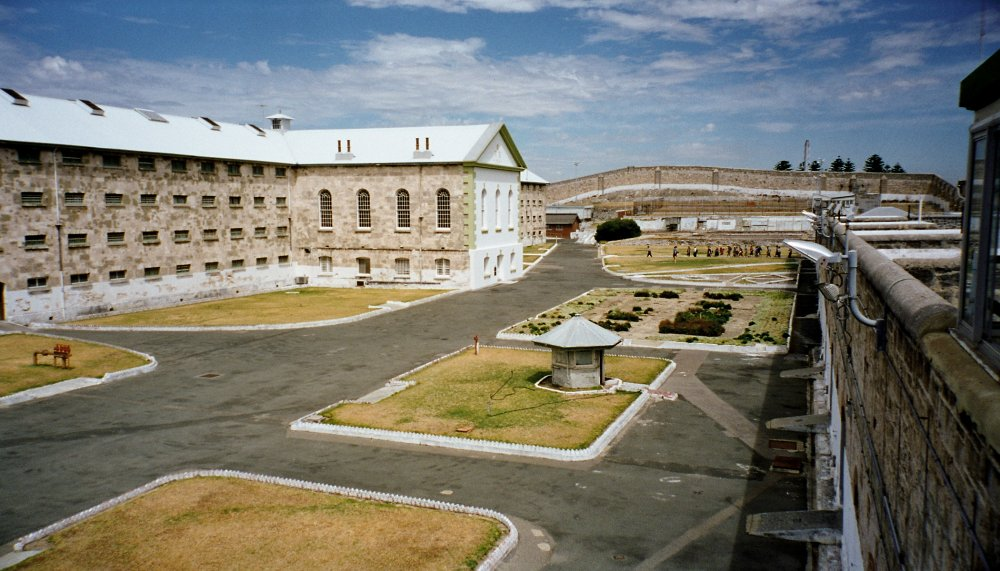
Built by convicts in the early 1850s, Fremantle Prison is a UNESCO World Heritage Site.

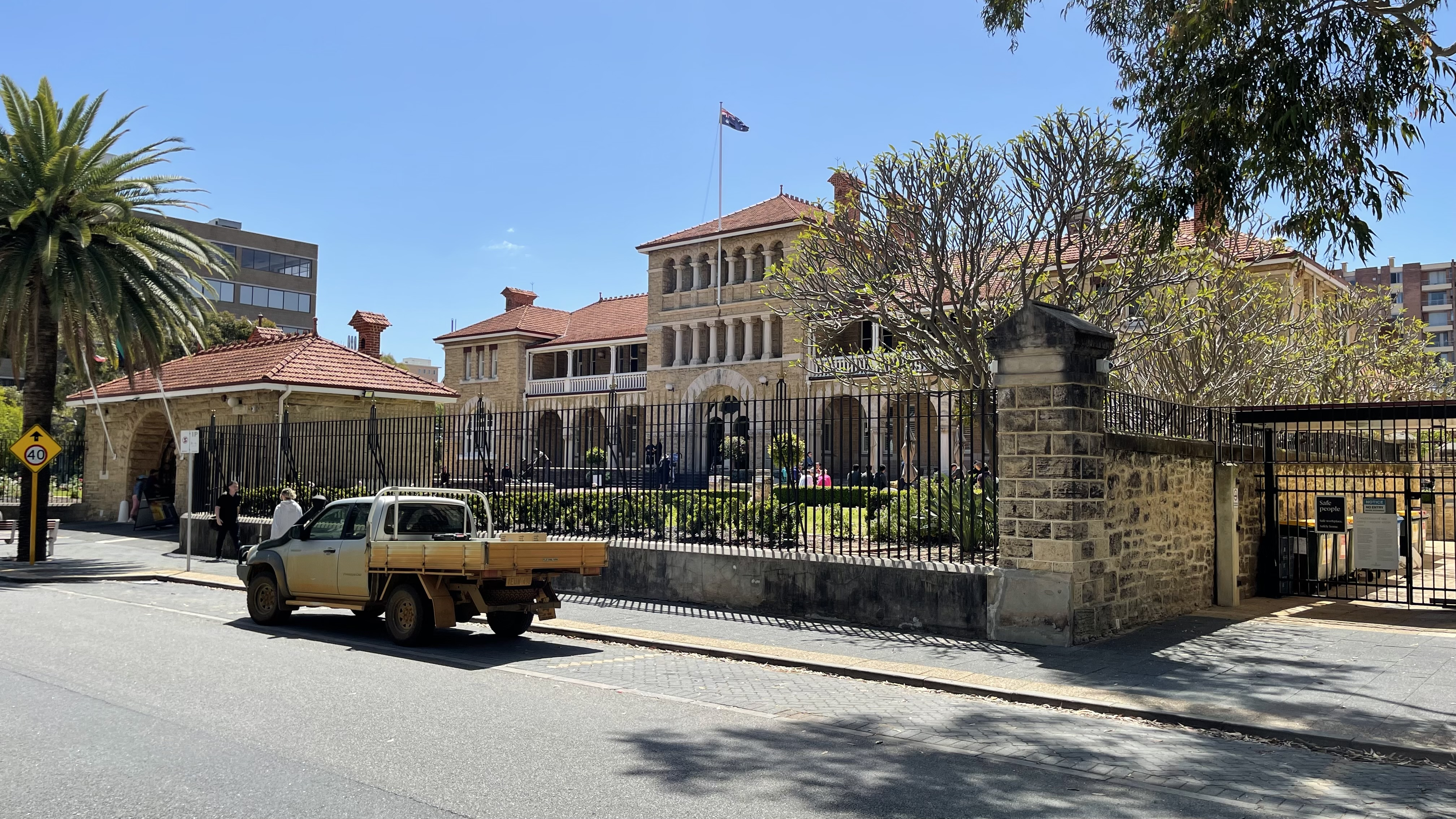
Perth Mint, built in 1899 to refine gold from the gold rushes

In 1850, at a time when penal transportation to Australia's eastern colonies had ceased, Western Australia was opened to convicts at the request of farming and business people due to a shortage of labour. Over the next eighteen years, 9,721 convicts arrived in Western Australia aboard 43 ships, outnumbering the approximately 7,300 free settlers.

The designation of Perth as a city was formally announced by Queen Victoria in 1856. However, despite this recognition, Perth remained a tranquil town. A description from 1870 by a Melbourne journalist depicted it as:

a quiet little town of some 3000 inhabitants spread out in straggling allotments down to the water's edge, intermingled with gardens and shrubberies and half rural in its aspect ... The main streets are macadamised, but the outlying ones and most of the footpaths retain their native state from the loose sand—the all pervading element of Western Australia—productive of intense glare or much dust in the summer and dissolving into slush during the rainy season.

With the discovery of gold at Kalgoorlie and Coolgardie in the late 19th century, Western Australia experienced a mining boom. Perth became a key hub for supplying the goldfields, and the newfound prosperity helped finance the construction of important public buildings, roads and railways. Perth's population grew from approximately 8,500 in 1881 to 61,000 in 1901.

=== Federation and beyond ===
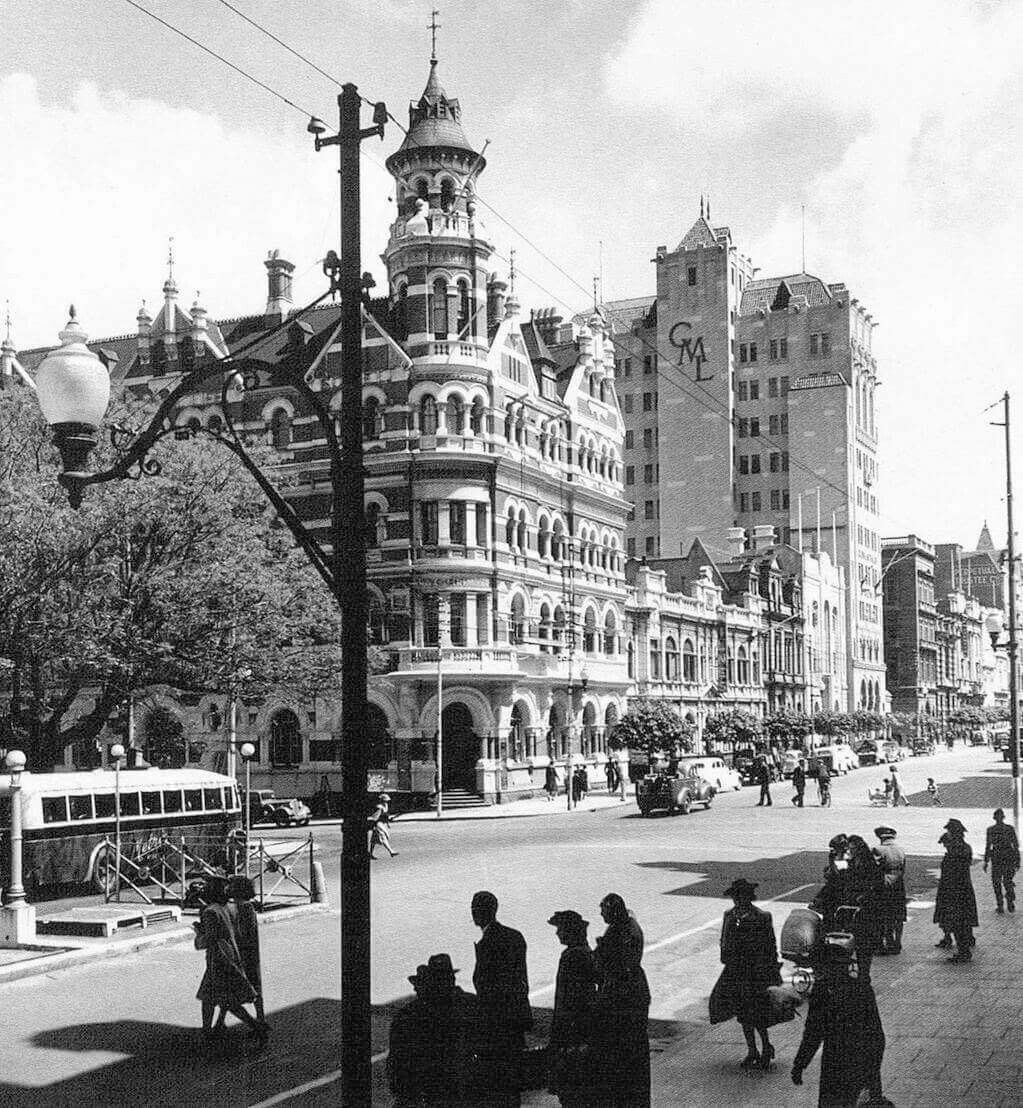
Like many of Perth's colonial-era buildings, Moir Chambers (left) at the southwest corner of the St Georges Terrace and Barrack Street intersection was demolished to make way for Citibank House during a period of substantial modernisation in the 1960s-70s.

After a referendum in 1900, Western Australia joined the Federation of Australia in 1901, and "became a founding state of Australia". It was the last of the Australian colonies to agree to join the Federation, and it did so only after the other colonies had offered several concessions, including the construction of a transcontinental railway line from Port Augusta in South Australia to Kalgoorlie to link Perth with the eastern states.

In 1927, Indigenous people were prohibited from entering large swathes of Perth under penalty of imprisonment, a ban that lasted until 1954.

In 1933, two-thirds of Western Australians voted in a referendum to secede from the rest of Australia. However, the state general election held at the same time as the referendum had voted out the pro-independence government, replacing it with a government that did not support the independence movement. Respecting the result of the referendum, the new government nonetheless petitioned the Imperial Parliament at Westminster. The House of Commons established a select committee to consider the issue but after 18 months of negotiations and lobbying, finally refused to consider the matter, declaring that it could not legally grant secession.

Perth entered the post-war period with a population of approximately 280,000 and an economy that had not experienced sustained growth since the 1920s. Successive state governments, beginning with the Willcock Labor Government (1936–1945), determined to change this. Planning for post-war economic development was initially driven by Russell Dumas, who as Director of Public Works (1941–1953) drew up plans for Western Australia's major post-war public-works projects, including the raising of the Mundaring and Wellington dams, the development of the new Perth Airport, and the development of a new industrial zone centred on Kwinana. The advent of the McLarty Liberal Government (1947–1953) saw the emergence of something of a consensus on the need for continuing economic development. Economic growth was fuelled by large-scale public works, the post-war immigration program, and the success that various state governments had in attracting substantial foreign investment into the state, beginning with the construction of the Anglo-Iranian Oil Refinery at Kwinana in 1951–52.

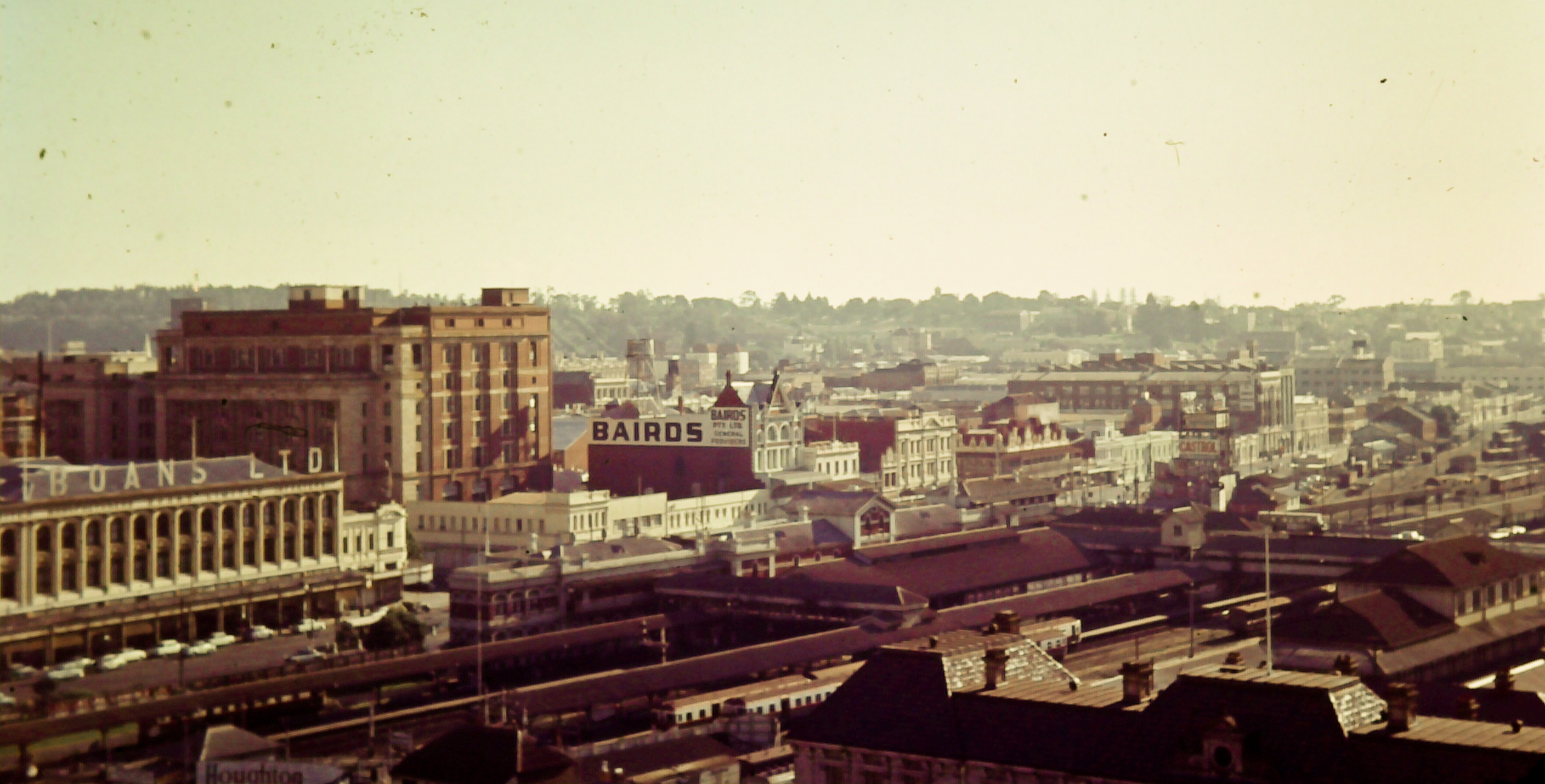
Looking across Perth railway station c. 1955

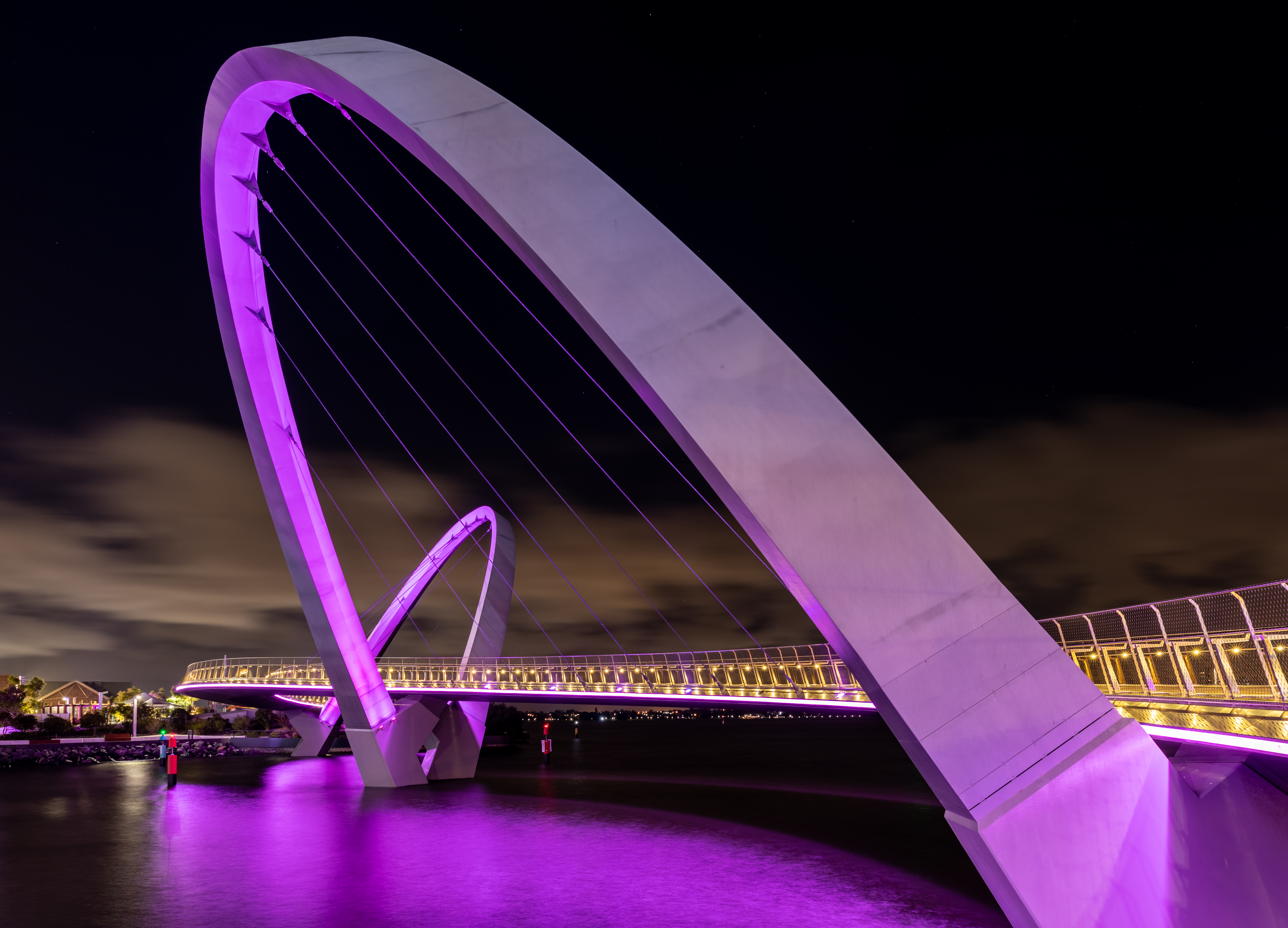
Elizabeth Quay Bridge

The result of this economic activity was the rapid growth of the population of Perth and a marked change in its urban design. Commencing in the 1950s, Perth began to expand along an extensive highway network laid out in the Stephenson-Hepburn Report, which noted that Perth was beginning to resemble a pattern of development less in line with the British experience and more in line with North America. This was encouraged by the opening of the Narrows Bridge and the gradual closure of the Perth and Fremantle tram systems. The mining-pastoral boom of the 1960s only accelerated the pace of urban growth in Perth.

In 1962, Perth received global media attention when city residents lit their house lights and streetlights as American astronaut John Glenn passed overhead while orbiting the Earth on Friendship 7. This led to its being nicknamed the "City of Light". (Note: The city most commonly referred to as the "City of Light" is Paris. However, over 30 other cities also carry the label in various forms.) The city repeated the act as Glenn passed overhead on the Space Shuttle in 1998 on STS-95.

Perth's development and relative prosperity, especially since the mid-1960s, has resulted from its role as the main service centre for the state's resource industries, which extract gold, iron ore, nickel, alumina, diamonds, mineral sands, coal, oil and natural gas. Whilst most mineral and petroleum production takes place elsewhere in the state, the non-base services provide most of the employment and income to the people of Perth.

Perth saw significant population growth in the 2000s, as well as the commencement of several major urban infrastructure projects, bolstered in part by the state's mining boom. These include the Perth Convention and Exhibition Centre (2004) and the redevelopment of the city's waterfront, giving rise to the mixed-use Elizabeth Quay precinct.

== Geography ==
=== Central business district ===
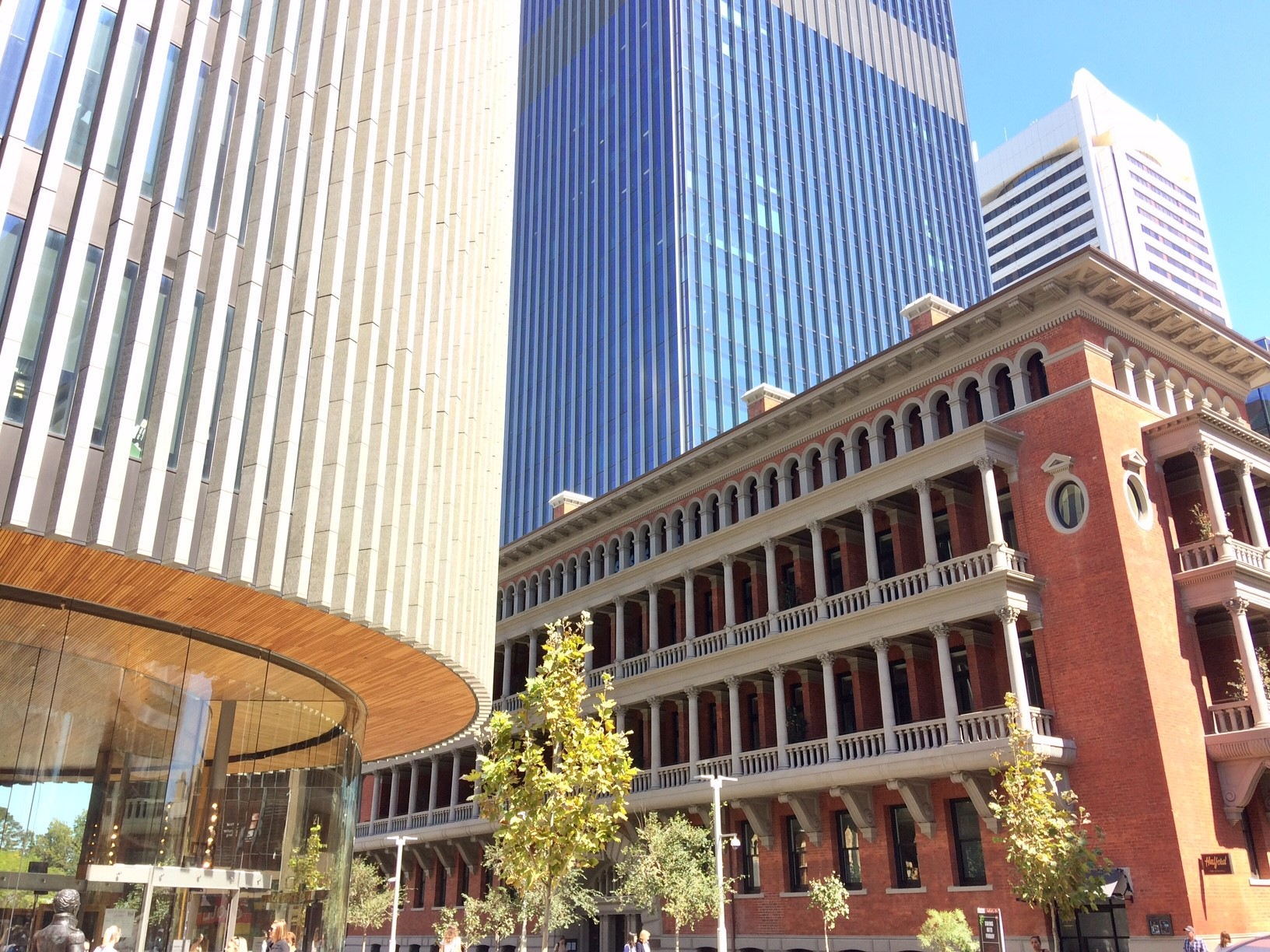
City of Perth Library and State Buildings, Hay Street

The central business district of Perth is bounded by the Swan River to the south and east, with Kings Park and Thomas Street on the western end, and Newcastle Street to the north. A state and federally funded project named Perth City Link sank a section of the railway line to allow easy pedestrian access between Northbridge and the CBD. The Perth Arena is an entertainment and sporting arena in the city link area that has received several architectural awards from institutions such as the Design Institute of Australia, the Australian Institute of Architects, and Colorbond. St Georges Terrace is the area's prominent street, with a large amount of office space in the CBD. Hay Street and Murray Street have most of the retail and entertainment facilities. The city's tallest building is Central Park, the twelfth tallest building in Australia. The CBD until 2012 was the centre of a mining-induced boom, with several commercial and residential projects being built, including Brookfield Place, a 244-metre (801 ft) office building for Anglo-Australian mining company BHP.

=== Metropolitan area ===
Area of the Perth Metropolitan Region Scheme

Perth's metropolitan area extends along the coast to Two Rocks in the north and Singleton to the south, a distance of approximately 125 kilometres (80 mi). From the coast in the west to Mundaring in the east is a distance of approximately 50 kilometres (30 mi). The Perth metropolitan area covers 6,418 square kilometres (2,478 sq mi). The built-up urban area of Perth is 1,722 square kilometres (665 sq mi), the same as Wuhan or Salt Lake City and slightly smaller than London, making Perth the 67th-largest urban area in the world. Perth is also the 50th-least densely populated out of the 990 urban areas in the world with a population above 500,000.

The metropolitan region is defined by the Planning and Development Act 2005 to include 30 local government areas, with the outer extent being the City of Wanneroo and the City of Swan to the north, the Shire of Mundaring, City of Kalamunda and the City of Armadale to the east, the Shire of Serpentine-Jarrahdale to the south-east and the City of Rockingham to the south-west, and including Rottnest Island and Garden Island off the west coast. This extent correlates with the Metropolitan Region Scheme, and the Australian Bureau of Statistics' Perth (Major Statistical Division).

The metropolitan extent of Perth can be defined in other ways—the Australian Bureau of Statistics Greater Capital City Statistical Area, or Greater Perth in short, consists of that area, plus the City of Mandurah and the Pinjarra Level 2 Statistical Area of the Shire of Murray, while the Regional Development Commissions Act 1993 includes the Shire of Serpentine-Jarrahdale in the Peel region.

=== Geology and landforms ===
The largest river flowing through Perth is the Swan River, named for the native black swans by Willem de Vlamingh, captain of a Dutch expedition and namer of Western Australia's Rottnest Island, who discovered the birds while exploring the area in 1697. This water body is also known as Derbarl Yerrigan. The city centre and most of the suburbs are on the sandy and relatively flat Swan Coastal Plain, which lies between the Darling Scarp and the Indian Ocean. The soils of this area are quite infertile.

Much of colonial Perth was built on the Perth Wetlands, a series of freshwater wetlands running from Herdsman Lake in the west through to Claisebrook Cove in the east.

To the east, the city is bordered by a low escarpment called the Darling Scarp. Perth is on generally flat, rolling land, largely due to the high amount of sandy soils and deep bedrock. The Perth metropolitan area has two major river systems, one made up of the Swan and Canning Rivers, and one of the Serpentine and Murray Rivers, which discharge into the Peel Inlet at Mandurah. The Perth-Gingin Shrublands and Woodlands and Banksia Woodlands of the Swan Coastal Plain straddle the metropolitan area.

=== Climate ===
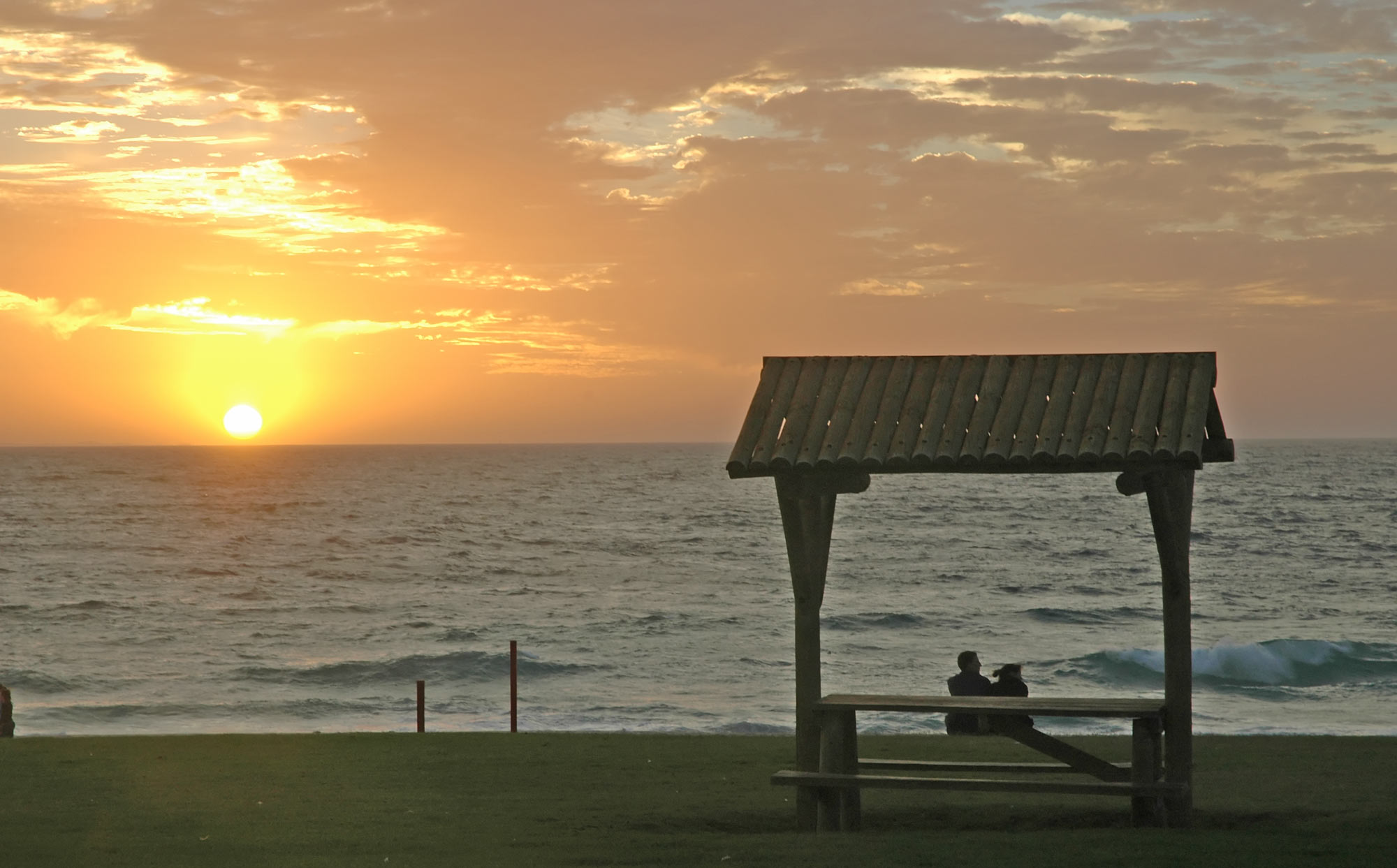
Sunset over the Indian Ocean at City Beach

Perth receives moderate, though highly seasonal, winter-based rainfall. Summers are generally hot, sunny and dry, lasting from December to March, with February generally the hottest month. Winters are relatively mild and wet, giving Perth a hot-summer Mediterranean climate (Köppen climate classification Csa). Perth has an average of 8.8 hours of sunshine per day, which equates to around 3,200 hours of sunshine and 138.7 clear days annually, making it Australia's sunniest capital city.

Summers are typically hot and dry but not completely devoid of rain, with sporadic rainfall in the form of short-lived thunderstorms, weak cold fronts and on occasions decaying tropical cyclones from Western Australia's north-west, which can bring heavy rain. Temperatures above 35 °C (95 °F) occur, on average, 26 days per year and rise above 40 °C (104 °F) on 5 days per year. The highest temperature recorded in Perth was 46.2 °C (115.2 °F) on 23 February 1991, although Perth Airport recorded 46.7 °C (116.1 °F) on the same day. On most summer afternoons a sea breeze, known locally as the Fremantle Doctor, blows from the south-west, providing relief from the hot north-easterly winds. Temperatures often fall below 30 °C (86 °F) a few hours after the arrival of the wind change. In the summer, the 3 p.m. dewpoint averages at around 12 °C (54 °F).

Winters are mild and wet, with most of Perth's annual rainfall between May and September. Winters see significant rainfall as frontal systems move across the region, interspersed with clear and sunny days where minimum temperatures tend to drop below 5 °C (41 °F). The lowest temperature recorded in Perth was −0.7 °C (30.7 °F) on 17 June 2006. The lowest temperature within the Perth metropolitan area was −3.4 °C (25.9 °F) on the same day at Jandakot Airport, although temperatures at or below zero are rare occurrences. The lowest maximum temperature recorded in Perth is 8.8 °C (47.8 °F) on 26 June 1956. It occasionally gets cold enough for frost to form. While snow has never been recorded in the Perth CBD, light snowfalls have been reported in outer suburbs of Perth in the Perth Hills around Kalamunda, Roleystone and Mundaring. The most recent snowfall was in 1968.

The rainfall pattern has changed in Perth and south-west Western Australia since the mid-1970s. A significant reduction in winter rainfall has been observed with a greater number of extreme rainfall events in the summer, such as the slow-moving storms on 8 February 1992 that brought 120.6 millimetres (4.75 in) of rain, heavy rainfall associated with a tropical low on 10 February 2017, which brought 114.4 millimetres (4.50 in) of rain, and the remnants of ex-Tropical Cyclone Joyce on 15 January 2018 with 96.2 millimetres (3.79 in). Perth was also hit by a severe thunderstorm on 22 March 2010, which brought 40.2 mm (1.58 in) of rain, and large hail and caused significant damage in the metropolitan area.

The average sea temperature ranges from 18.9 °C (66.0 °F) in October to 23.4 °C (74.1 °F) in March.

Climate data for Perth Metro
Month	Jan	Feb	Mar	Apr	May	Jun	Jul	Aug	Sep	Oct	Nov	Dec	Year
Record high °C (°F)	44.4 (111.9)	46.2 (115.2)	42.4 (108.3)	39.5 (103.1)	34.3 (93.7)	26.2 (79.2)	25.8 (78.4)	30.0 (86.0)	34.3 (93.7)	37.2 (99.0)	40.4 (104.7)	44.2 (111.6)	46.2 (115.2)
Mean maximum °C (°F)	40.4 (104.7)	40.1 (104.2)	38.6 (101.5)	33.9 (93.0)	28.7 (83.7)	24.2 (75.6)	22.7 (72.9)	24.5 (76.1)	27.3 (81.1)	33.0 (91.4)	36.9 (98.4)	39.5 (103.1)	41.8 (107.2)
Mean daily maximum °C (°F)	31.4 (88.5)	31.7 (89.1)	29.7 (85.5)	26.0 (78.8)	22.4 (72.3)	19.5 (67.1)	18.5 (65.3)	19.2 (66.6)	20.6 (69.1)	23.5 (74.3)	26.8 (80.2)	29.6 (85.3)	24.9 (76.8)
Daily mean °C (°F)	24.8 (76.6)	25.0 (77.0)	23.3 (73.9)	19.9 (67.8)	16.5 (61.7)	14.1 (57.4)	13.3 (55.9)	13.9 (57.0)	15.2 (59.4)	17.6 (63.7)	20.6 (69.1)	23.1 (73.6)	18.9 (66.1)
Mean daily minimum °C (°F)	18.1 (64.6)	18.4 (65.1)	16.9 (62.4)	13.8 (56.8)	10.5 (50.9)	8.7 (47.7)	8.1 (46.6)	8.5 (47.3)	9.7 (49.5)	11.7 (53.1)	14.4 (57.9)	16.6 (61.9)	13.0 (55.4)
Mean minimum °C (°F)	12.6 (54.7)	13.1 (55.6)	10.0 (50.0)	7.6 (45.7)	4.3 (39.7)	2.3 (36.1)	1.8 (35.2)	2.6 (36.7)	3.6 (38.5)	5.4 (41.7)	8.8 (47.8)	11.1 (52.0)	1.1 (34.0)
Record low °C (°F)	8.9 (48.0)	9.9 (49.8)	6.3 (43.3)	4.7 (40.5)	1.3 (34.3)	−0.7 (30.7)	0.0 (32.0)	1.3 (34.3)	1.0 (33.8)	2.2 (36.0)	5.0 (41.0)	6.6 (43.9)	−0.7 (30.7)
Average rainfall mm (inches)	16.7 (0.66)	13.1 (0.52)	20.0 (0.79)	35.9 (1.41)	86.2 (3.39)	127.1 (5.00)	147.0 (5.79)	122.7 (4.83)	79.3 (3.12)	39.5 (1.56)	24.2 (0.95)	9.4 (0.37)	723.9 (28.50)
Average precipitation days (≥ 1 mm)	1.5	1.2	2.6	4.7	8.7	11.8	14.8	13.1	10.7	5.7	3.8	1.8	80.4
Average afternoon relative humidity (%) (at 15:00)	39	38	40	46	50	56	57	54	53	47	44	41	47
Average dew point °C (°F)	12.6 (54.7)	12.7 (54.9)	11.7 (53.1)	11.0 (51.8)	9.7 (49.5)	8.7 (47.7)	8.0 (46.4)	7.9 (46.2)	8.3 (46.9)	8.8 (47.8)	10.1 (50.2)	11.1 (52.0)	10.0 (50.0)
Mean monthly sunshine hours	356.5	319.0	297.6	249.0	207.0	177.0	189.1	223.2	231.0	297.6	318.0	356.5	3,221.5
Percentage possible sunshine	83	83	74	70	63	57	57	63	64	72	77	79	70
Average ultraviolet index	12	11	9	6	4	3	3	4	6	8	10	12	7
Source: Bureau of Meteorology; Temperatures: 1993–2023; Rainfall: 1993–2023; Relative humidity: 1994–2011

=== Isolation ===
With more than two million residents, Perth is one of the most isolated major cities in the world. The nearest city with a population of more than 100,000 is Adelaide, over 2,100 km (1,305 mi) away. Perth is geographically closer to both Timor-Leste (2,800 km or 1,700 mi), and Jakarta, Indonesia (3,010 km or 1,870 mi), than to Sydney (3,290 km or 2,040 mi).

== Demographics ==
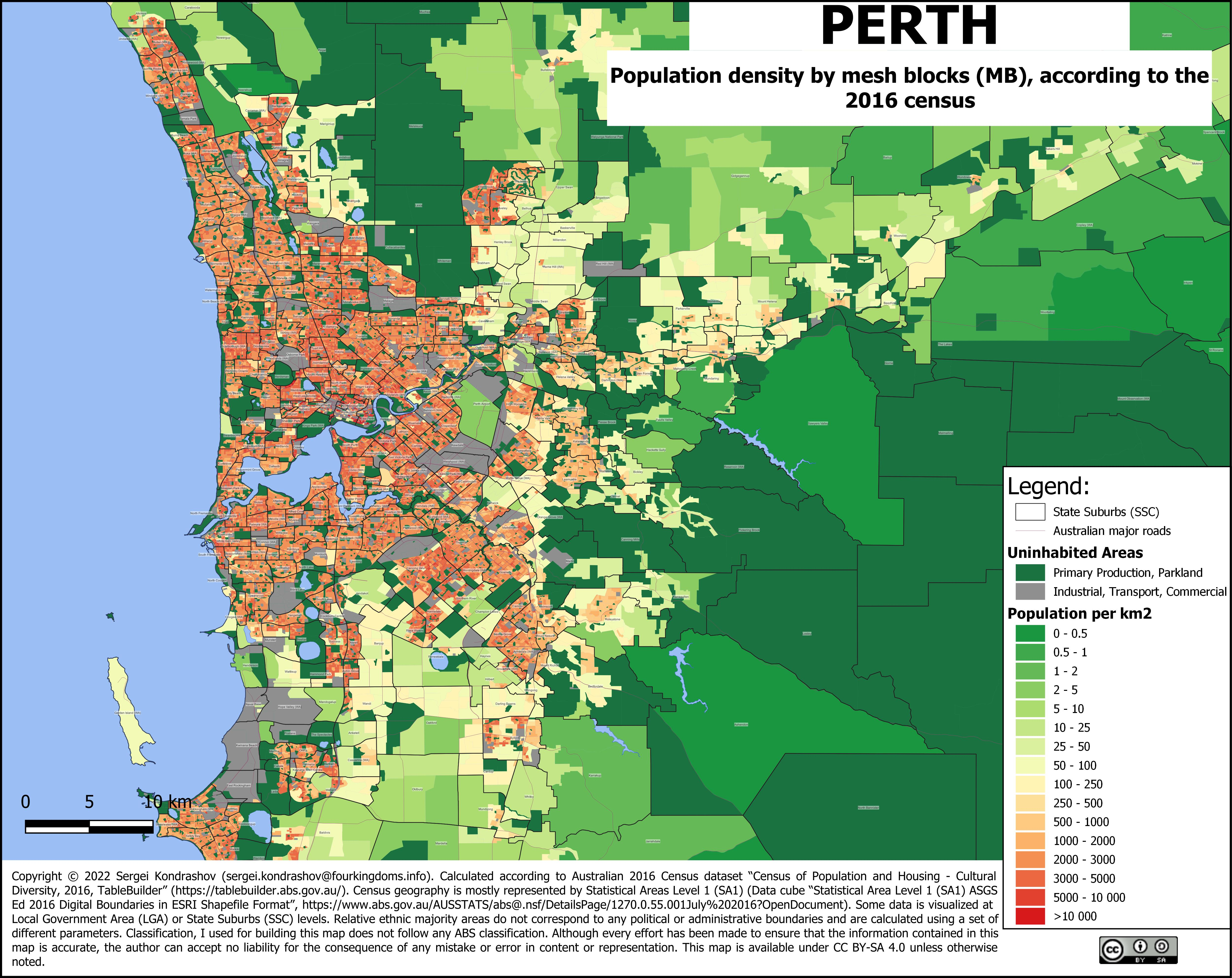
Perth population density by mesh blocks (MB), according to the 2016 census

Historical populations

Perth Statistical Division
Year	Pop.	±% p.a.
1854	4,001	—
1859	6,293	+9.48%
1870	8,220	+2.46%
1881	9,955	+1.76%
1891	16,694	+5.31%
1901	67,431	+14.98%
1911	116,181	+5.59%
1921	170,213	+3.89%
1933	230,340	+2.55%
1947	302,968	+1.98%
1954	395,049	+3.86%
1961	475,398	+2.68%
1966	559,298	+3.30%
1971	703,199	+4.69%
Source: ABS

Greater Perth Statistical Area
Year	Pop.	±% p.a.
1971	744,600	—
1976	845,700	+2.58%
1981	941,479	+2.17%
1986	1,075,959	+2.71%
1991	1,226,115	+2.65%
1996	1,344,378	+1.86%
2001	1,452,058	+1.55%
2006	1,590,007	+1.83%
2008	1,687,815	+3.03%
2010	1,785,076	+2.84%
2016	1,943,853	+1.43%
2021	2,143,776	+1.98%
Source: ABS; Note: Greater Perth includes the City of Mandurah and part of the Shire of Murray, south of Perth.

Perth is Australia's fourth-most-populous city, having overtaken Adelaide in 1984. In June 2023 there was an estimated resident population of 2,309,338 in the Greater Perth area, representing an increase of approximately 3.6% from the 2022 estimate of 2,228,020, the highest growth rate of Australia's capital cities.

=== Ancestry and immigration ===
Country of birth (2021)
Birthplace (Note: In accordance with the Australian Bureau of Statistics source, England, Scotland, Mainland China and the Special Administrative Regions of Hong Kong and Macau are listed separately.)	Population
Australia	1,258,506
England	169,938
New Zealand	59,459
India	58,229
South Africa	38,793
Malaysia	31,268
Philippines	30,806
China	27,237
Scotland	23,280
Vietnam	17,174
Italy	16,536
Ireland	16,412
Singapore	15,387
Indonesia	13,031
Zimbabwe	10,743

At the 2021 census, the most commonly nominated ancestries were:

- English (36.8%)
- Australian (27.8%) (Note: The Australian Bureau of Statistics has stated that most who nominate Australian as their ancestry are part of the Anglo-Celtic group.)
- Irish (8.8%)
- Scottish (8.7%)
- Chinese (5.5%)
- Italian (5.5%)
- Indian (3.6%)
- German (2.8%)
- Dutch (2%)
- Filipino (1.9%)
- Aboriginal (1.8%) (Note: Those who nominated their ancestry as Aboriginal. Does not include Torres Strait Islanders. This relates to nomination of ancestry and is distinct from persons who identify as Indigenous (Aboriginal or Torres Strait Islander) which is a separate question.)
- South African (1.4%)
- Maori (1.1%)
- New Zealander (1.1%)
- Vietnamese (1.1%)
- Croatian (1%)

Perth's population is notable for the high proportion of British- and Irish-born residents. At the 2021 Census, 169,938 England-born Perth residents were counted, ahead of even Sydney (151,614), despite the latter having well over twice the population.

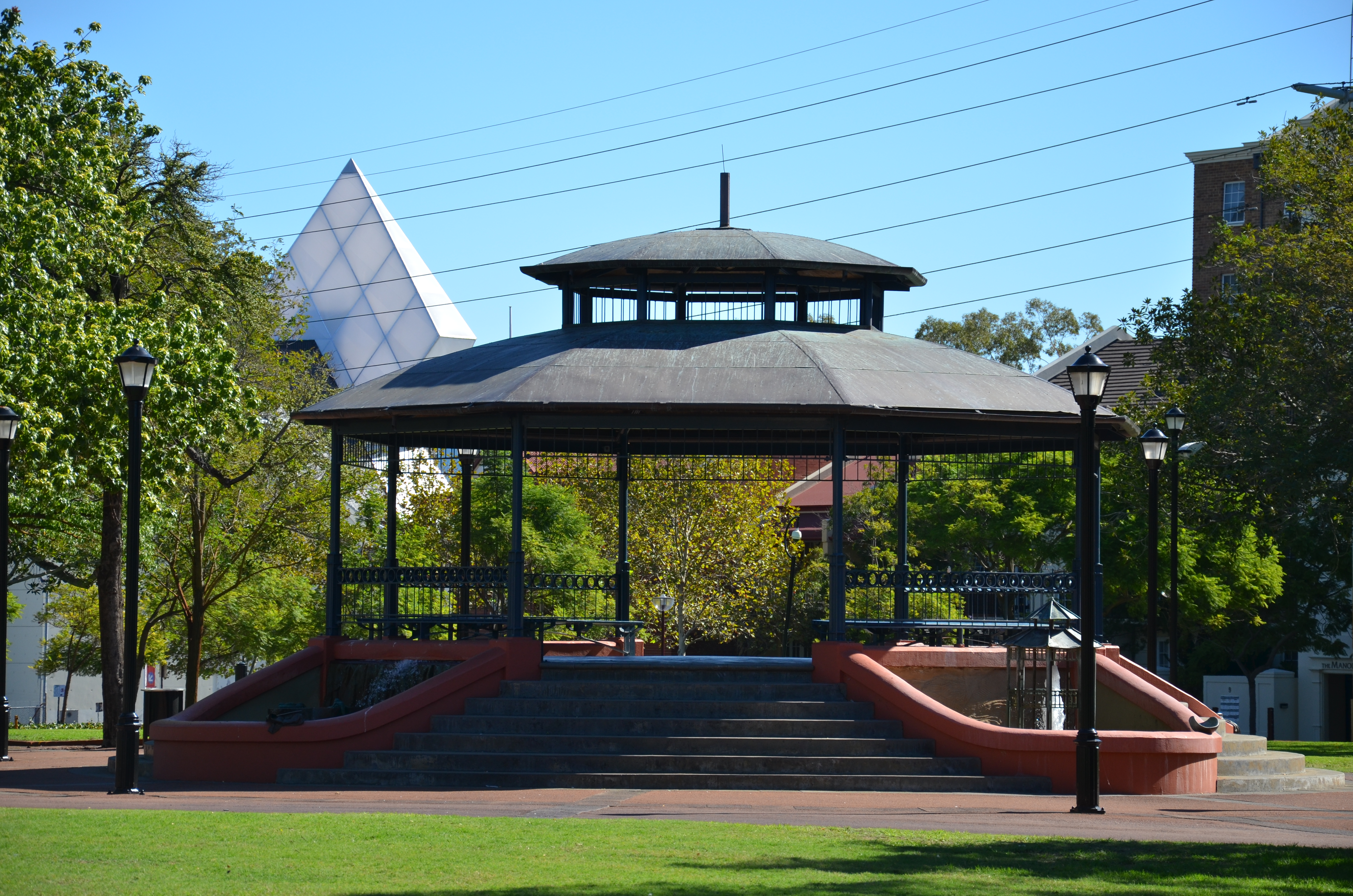
Russell Square, Northbridge—historically the favoured meeting place of the Italian community of "Little Italy"

The ethnic make-up of Perth changed in the second part of the 20th century when significant numbers of continental European immigrants arrived in the city. Prior to this, Perth's population had been almost completely Anglo-Celtic in ethnic origin. As Fremantle was the first landfall in Australia for many migrant ships coming from Europe in the 1950s and 1960s, Perth started to experience a diverse influx of people, including Italians, Greeks, Dutch, Germans, Turks, Croats and Macedonians. The Italian influence in the Perth and Fremantle area has been substantial, evident in places like the "Cappuccino strip" in Fremantle featuring many Italian eateries and shops. In Fremantle, the traditional Italian blessing of the fleet festival is held every year at the start of the fishing season. In Northbridge every December is the San Nicola (Saint Nicholas) Festival, which involves a pageant followed by a concert, predominantly in Italian. Suburbs surrounding the Fremantle area, such as Spearwood and Hamilton Hill, also contain high concentrations of Italians, Croatians and Portuguese. Perth has also been home to a small Jewish community since 1829—numbering 6,331 in 2021—who have emigrated primarily from Eastern Europe and more recently from South Africa.

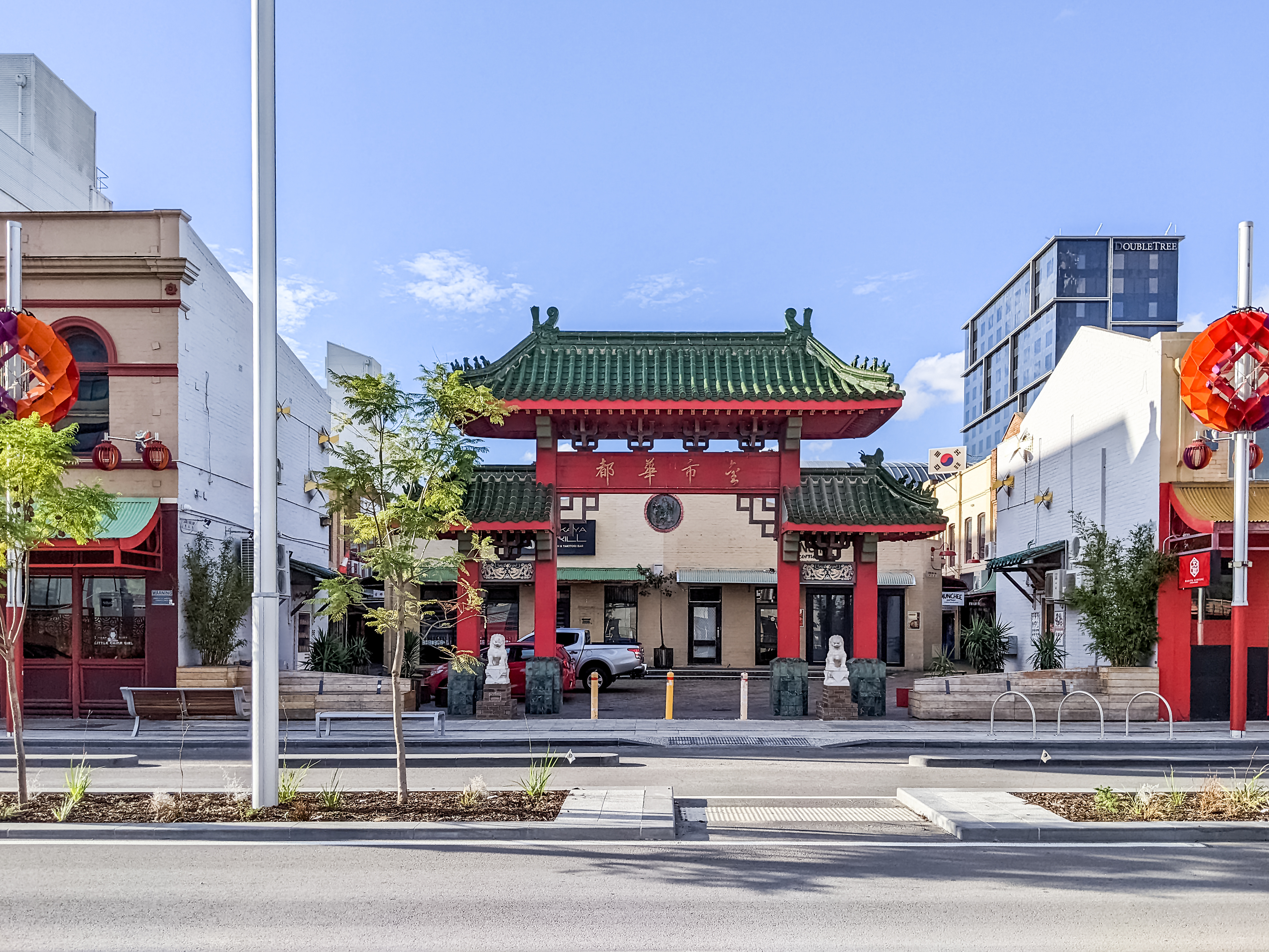
Chinatown entry on Roe Street

A more recent wave of arrivals includes white South Africans. South Africans overtook those born in Italy as the fourth-largest foreign group in 2001. By 2016, there were 35,262 South Africans residing in Perth. Many Afrikaners and Anglo-Africans emigrated to Perth during the 1980s and 1990s, with the phrase "packing for Perth" becoming associated with South Africans who choose to emigrate abroad, sometimes regardless of the destination. As a result, the city has been described as "the Australian capital of South Africans in exile".

Since the end of the White Australia policy in 1973, Asia has become an increasingly significant source of migrants, with communities from Vietnam, Malaysia, Indonesia, Thailand, Singapore, Hong Kong, Mainland China and India all now well established. There were 112,293 persons of Chinese descent in Perth in 2016—5.3% of the city's population. These are supported by the Australian Eurasian Association of Western Australia, which also serves a community of Portuguese-Malacca Eurasian or Kristang immigrants.

Middle Eastern immigrants have a presence in Perth. They come from a variety of countries, including Saudi Arabia, Syria, Iran, Iraq, Israel, Lebanon, The United Arab Emirates, Oman, Yemen and Afghanistan.

The Indian community includes a substantial number of Parsees who emigrated from Bombay—Perth being the closest Australian city to India—in 2021 those with Indian ancestry accounted for 3.5% of Perth's population Perth is also home to the largest population of Anglo-Burmese in the world; many settled here following the independence of Burma in 1948 with immigration taking off after 1962. The city is now the cultural hub for Anglo-Burmese worldwide. There is also a substantial Anglo-Indian population in Perth, who also settled in the city following the independence of India.

At the 2021 census, 2% of Perth's population identified as being Aboriginal and/or Torres Strait Islander. (Note: Indigenous identification is separate to the ancestry question on the Australian Census and persons identifying as Aboriginal or Torres Strait Islander may identify any ancestry.)

=== Language ===
At the 2021 census, 74% of inhabitants spoke only English at home, with the next most common languages being Mandarin (2.3%), Italian (1.1%), Vietnamese (1.0%), Punjabi (0.9%) and Cantonese (0.9%).

=== Religion ===
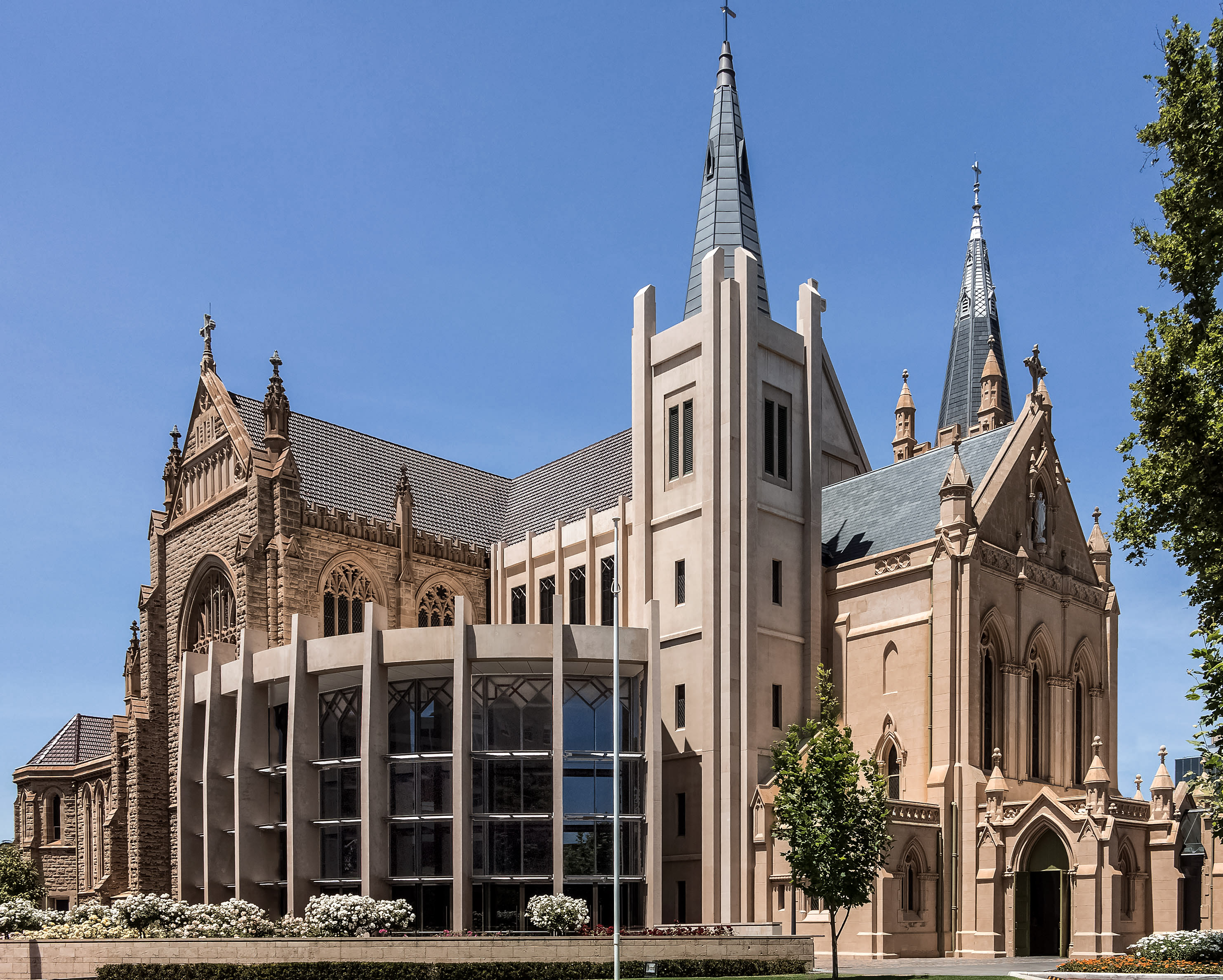
St Mary's Cathedral

41.8% of the 2021 census respondents in Perth had no religion, as against 38.4% of national population. In 1911, the national figure was 0.4%.

Catholics are the largest single Christian denomination in the Greater Perth area at 19.5%. Perth is the seat of the Roman Catholic Archdiocese of Perth. The Personal Ordinariate of Our Lady of the Southern Cross claims over 2,000 members. Anglicans are 9.9% of the population. Perth is the seat of the Anglican Diocese of Perth.

Buddhism and Islam each have more than 50,000 adherents. The suburb of Gidgengannup in the Perth Hills is home to the Dhammasara Nuns Monastery of the Buddhist Thai Forest Tradition. Over 31,000 members of the Uniting Church in Australia live in Perth.

Perth has the third largest Jewish population in Australia, numbering approximately 6,331 in the 2021 census. Perth's Jewish Day School, Carmel School claims a city Jewish population closer to 10,000. The city is home to both Orthodox and Progressive synagogues, most notably Perth Hebrew Congregation and Temple David. There is also a Chabad house in Perth.

The Baháʼí community in Perth numbers around 2,178. Hinduism has over 49,000 adherents in Perth; the Diwali (festival of lights) celebration in 2009 attracted over 20,000 visitors. There are Hindu temples in Canning Vale, Anketell and a Swaminarayan temple in Bennett Springs. Hinduism is the fastest growing religion in Australia. Perth is also home to 4,719 Mormons and the Perth Australia Temple of the Church of Jesus Christ of Latter-day Saints.

== Governance ==
Perth, like the rest of Australia, is governed by three levels of government: local, state and federal.

=== Local ===
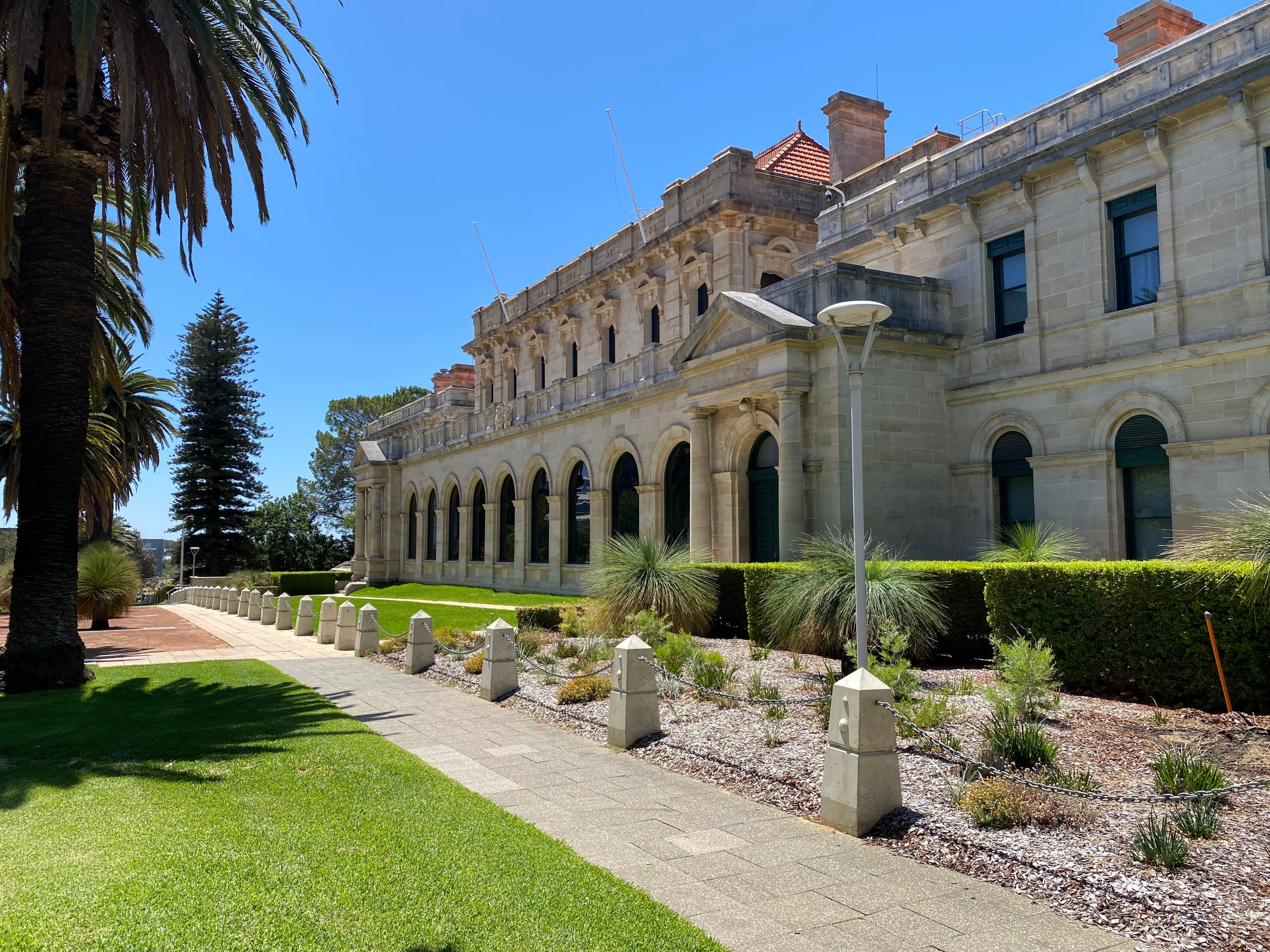
Parliament House

The Perth metropolitan area is divided into thirty local government bodies, including the City of Perth which administers Perth's central business district. The outer extent of the administrative region of Perth comprises the City of Wanneroo and the City of Swan to the north, the Shire of Mundaring, City of Kalamunda and the City of Armadale to the east, the Shire of Serpentine-Jarrahdale to the south-east and the City of Rockingham to the south-west, and including the islands of Rottnest Island and Garden Island off the west coast.

=== State ===
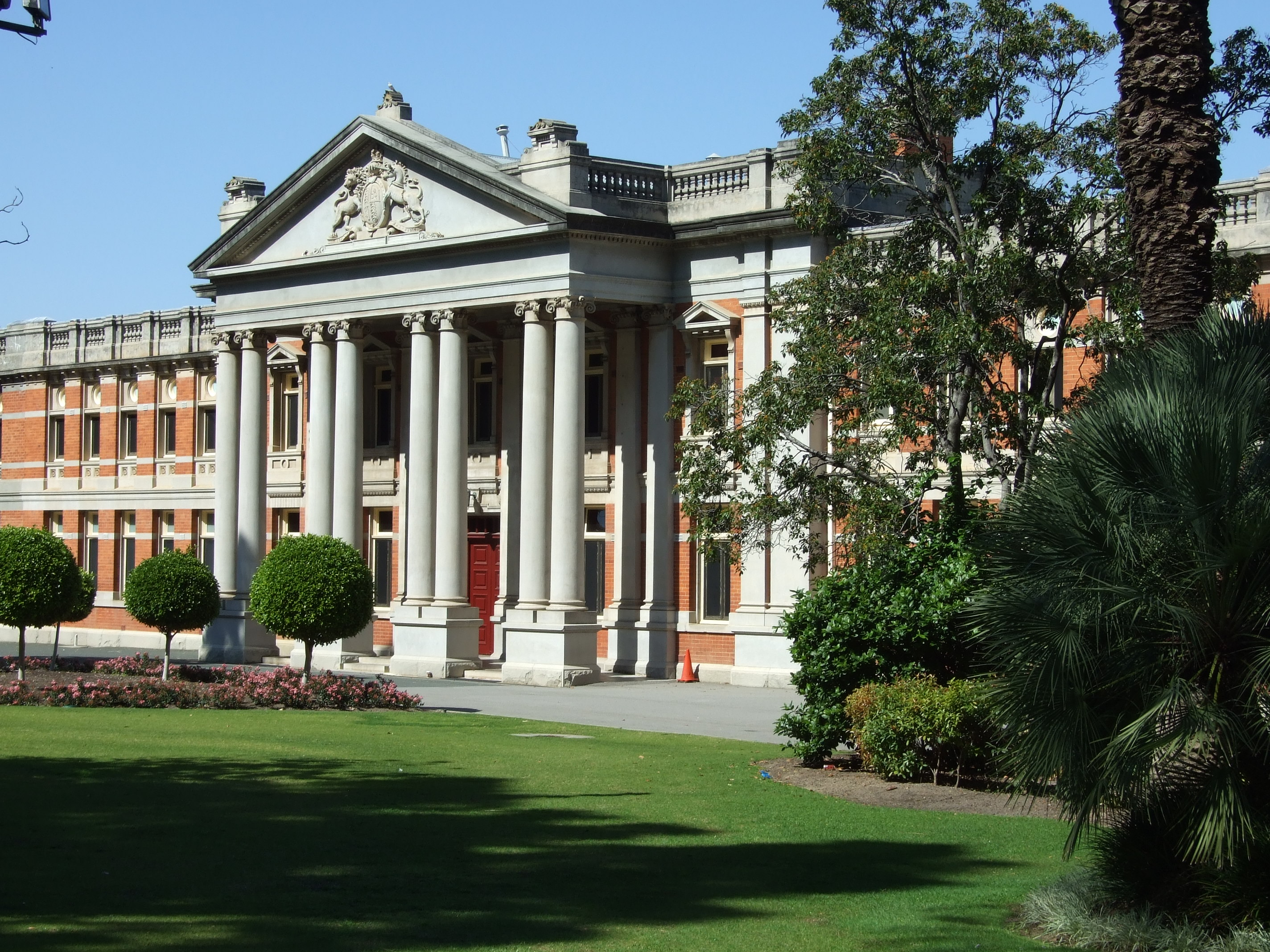
Supreme Court of Western Australia

Perth houses the Parliament of Western Australia and the Governor of Western Australia. As of the 2008 state election, 42 of the Legislative Assembly's 59 seats and 18 of the Legislative Council's 36 seats are based in Perth's metropolitan area.

The state's highest court, the Supreme Court, is located in Perth, along with the District and Family Courts. The Magistrates' Court has six metropolitan locations.

=== Federal ===
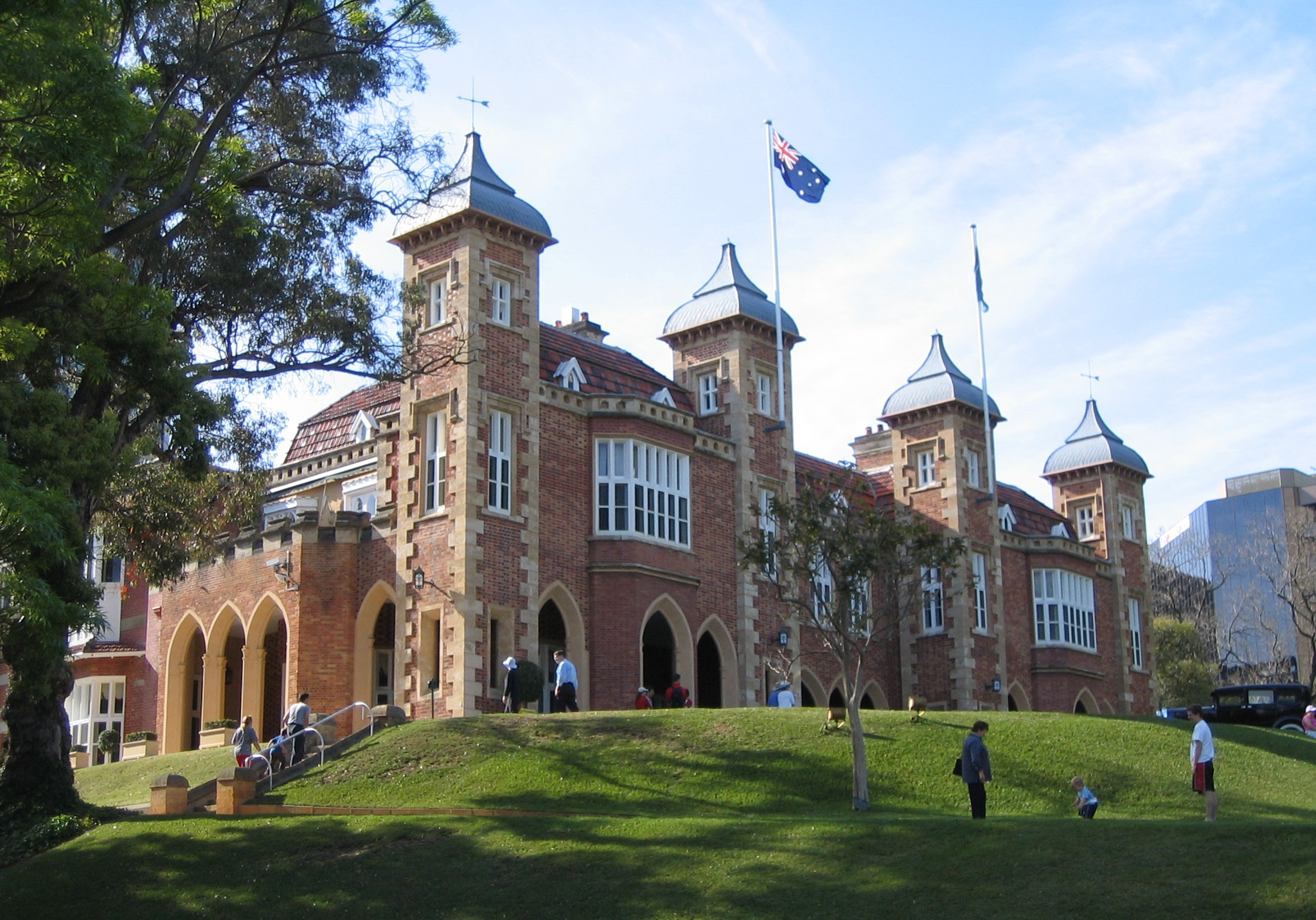
Government House

Perth is represented by 10 full seats and significant parts of three others in the Federal House of Representatives, with the seats of Canning, Pearce and Brand including some areas outside the metropolitan area.

The Federal Court of Australia and the Federal Circuit Court of Australia (previously the Federal Magistrates Court) occupy the Commonwealth Law Courts building on Victoria Avenue, which is also the location for annual Perth sittings of Australia's High Court.

== Economy ==
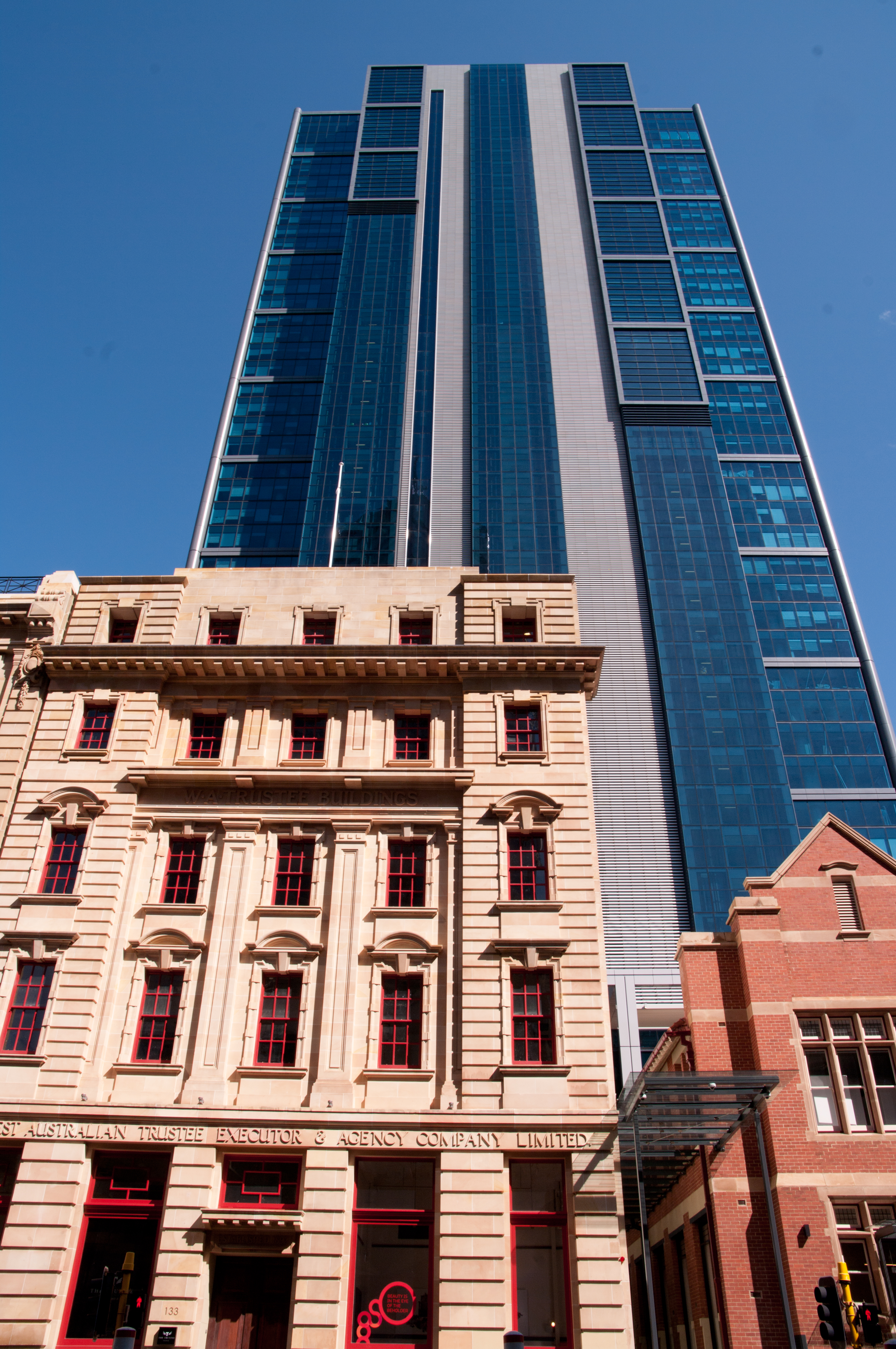
Brookfield Place towering above heritage buildings in the CBD. Built during the late 2000s mining boom, it is tenanted by the mining company BHP.

By virtue of its population and role as the administrative centre for business and government, Perth dominates the Western Australian economy, despite the major mining, petroleum and agricultural export industries being located elsewhere in the state. Perth's function as the state's capital city, its economic base and population size have also created development opportunities for many other businesses oriented to local or more diversified markets. Perth's economy has been changing in favour of the service industries since the 1950s. Although one of the major sets of services it provides is related to the resources industry and, to a lesser extent, agriculture, most people in Perth are not connected to either; they have jobs that provide services to other people in Perth.

As a result of Perth's relative geographical isolation, it has never had the necessary conditions to develop significant manufacturing industries other than those serving the immediate needs of its residents, mining, agriculture and some specialised areas, such as, in recent times, niche shipbuilding and maintenance. It was simply cheaper to import all the needed manufactured goods from either the eastern states or overseas.

Industrial employment influenced the economic geography of Perth. After WWII, Perth experienced suburban expansion aided by high levels of car ownership. Workforce decentralisation and transport improvements made it possible for the establishment of small-scale manufacturing in the suburbs. Many firms took advantage of relatively cheap land to build spacious, single-storey plants in suburban locations with plentiful parking, easy access and minimal traffic congestion. "The former close ties of manufacturing with near-central and/or rail-side locations were loosened."

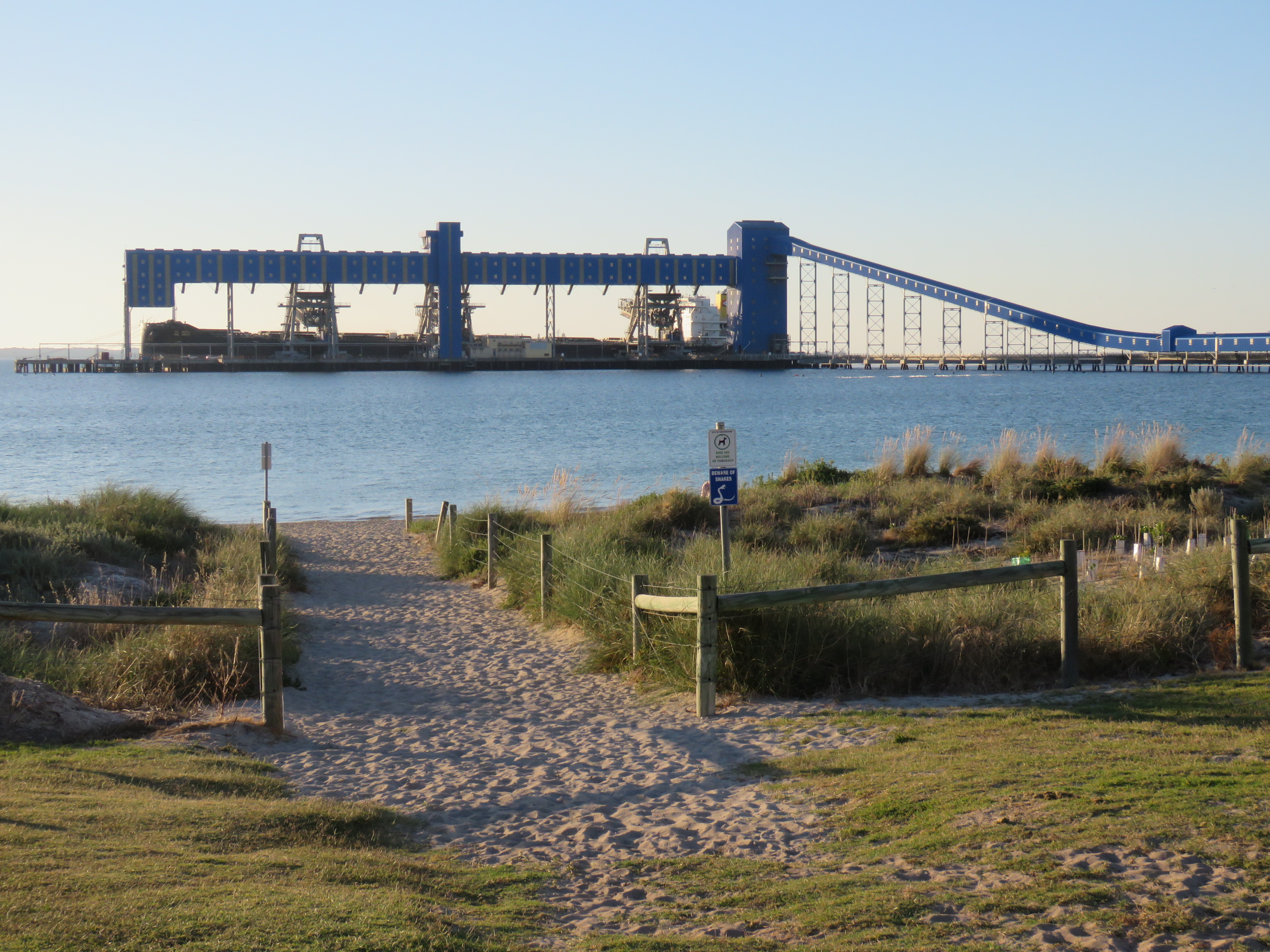
Bulk carrier at the CBH Grain Jetty in East Rockingham

Industrial estates such as Kwinana, Welshpool and Kewdale were post-war additions contributing to the growth of manufacturing south of the river. The establishment of the Kwinana industrial area was supported by standardisation of the east–west rail gauge linking Perth with eastern Australia. Since the 1950s the area has been dominated by heavy industry, including an oil refinery, steel-rolling mill with a blast furnace, alumina refinery, power station and a nickel refinery. Another development, also linked with rail standardisation, was in 1968 when the Kewdale Freight Terminal was developed adjacent to the Welshpool industrial area, replacing the former Perth railway yards.

With significant population growth post-WWII, employment growth occurred not in manufacturing but in retail and wholesale trade, business services, health, education, community and personal services, and in public administration. Increasingly it was these services sectors, concentrated around the Perth metropolitan area, that provided jobs.

Perth has also become a hub of technology-focused startups since the early 2000s that provide jobs to the Perth community. Companies such as Canva, VGW, Appbot, Agworld and Healthengine all hail from Perth and have made headlines globally. Organisations like StartupWA, Spacecubed and Perth Angels, and programs like Meshpoints, Curtin Accelerate and Plus Eight are all focused on creating a startup culture in Perth and growing the next generation of Perth-based employers.

== Education ==
Education is compulsory in Western Australia between the ages of six and seventeen, corresponding to primary and secondary school. Tertiary education is available through several universities and technical and further education (TAFE) colleges.

=== Primary and secondary ===
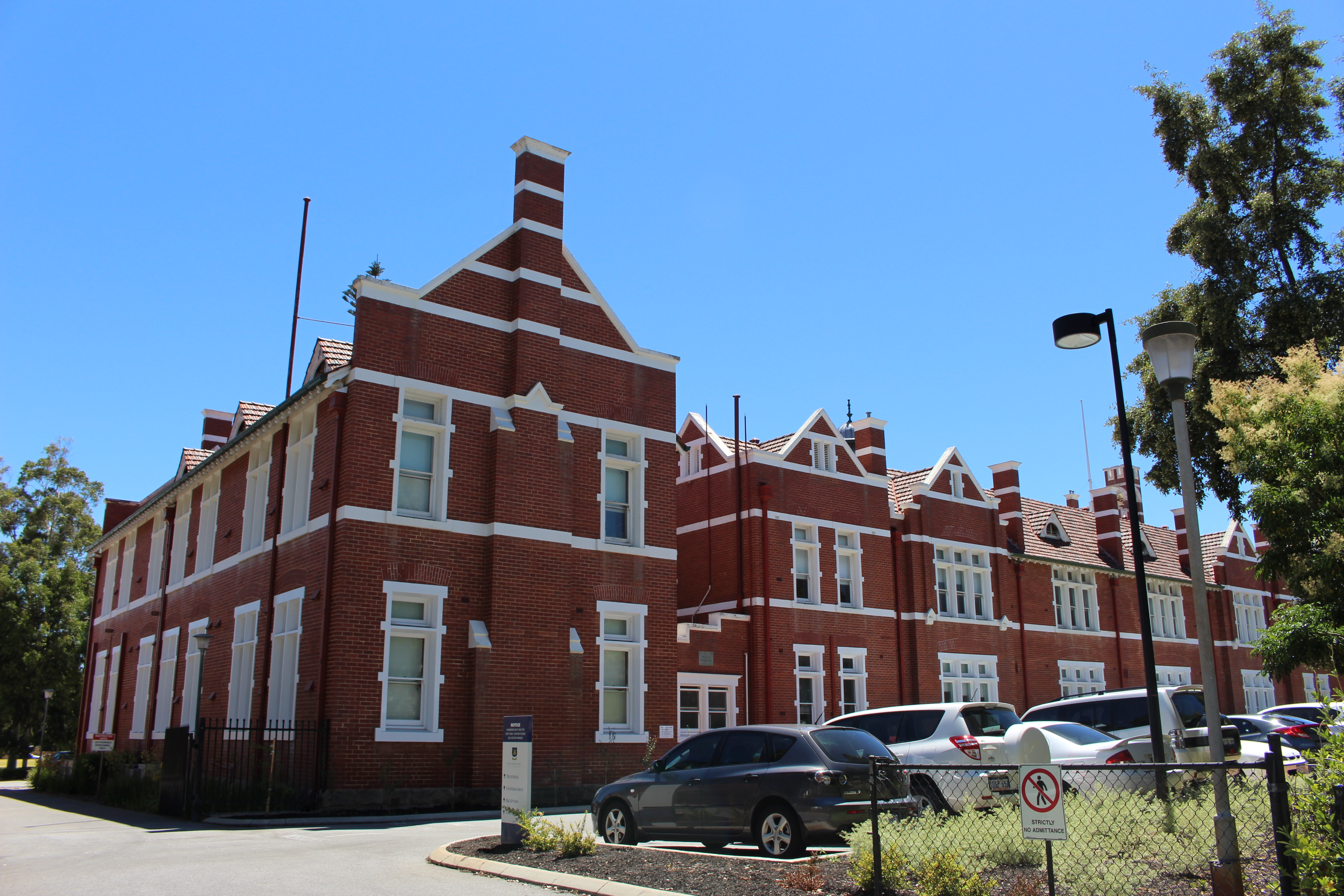
Perth Modern School, Perth's first public high school

Students may attend either public schools, run by the state government's Department of Education, or private schools, usually associated with a religion, or engage in home schooling.

The Western Australian Certificate of Education (WACE) is the credential given to students who have completed Years 11 and 12 of their secondary schooling.

In 2012 the minimum requirements for students to receive their WACE changed.

=== Tertiary ===
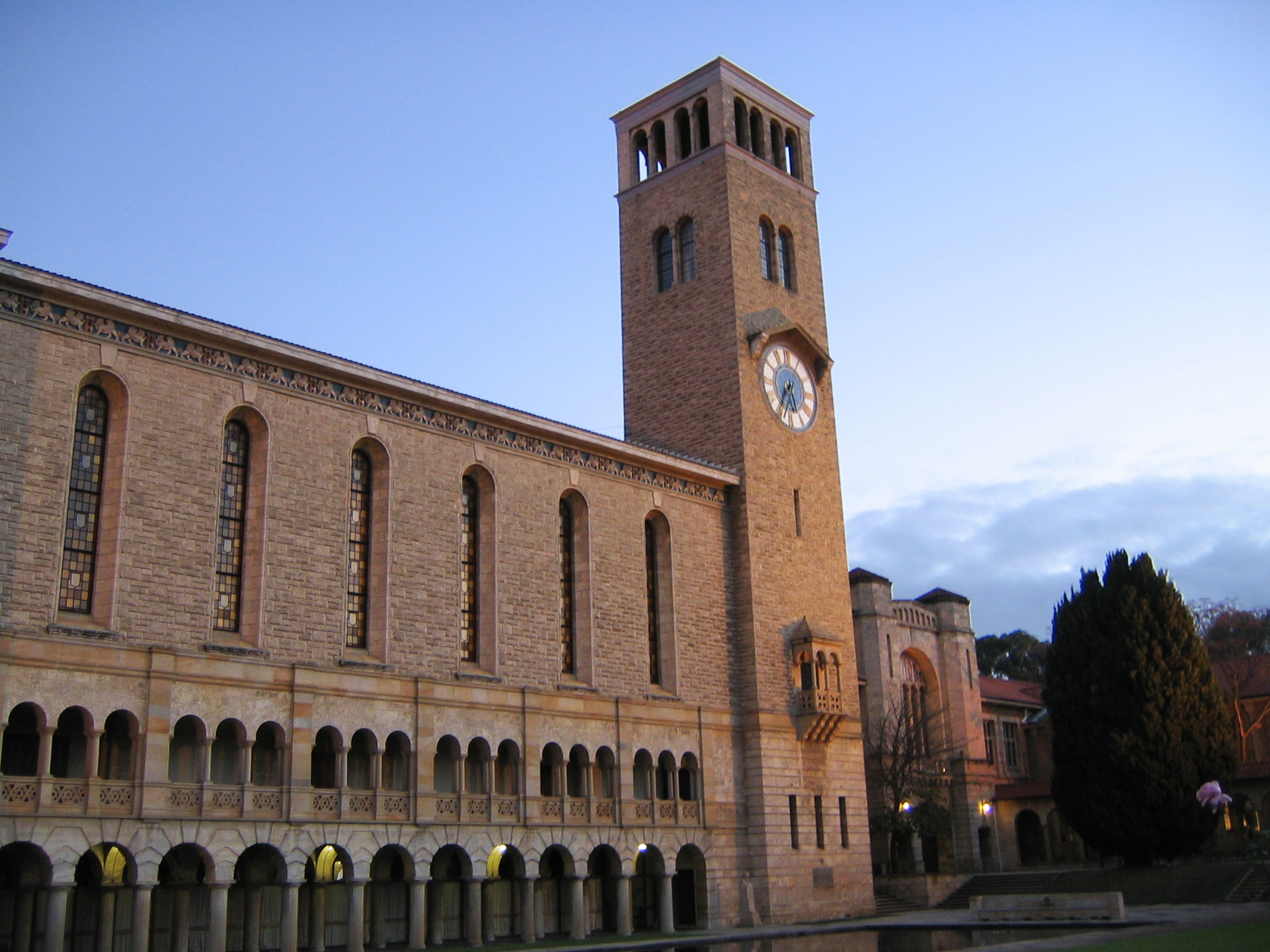
The University of Western Australia, located in Crawley

Perth is home to four public universities: the University of Western Australia, Curtin University, Murdoch University and Edith Cowan University. There are also two private universities, the University of Notre Dame Australia, and a local campus of the University of Divinity.

The University of Western Australia, which was founded in 1911, is renowned as one of Australia's leading research institutions. The university's monumental neo-classical architecture, most of which is carved from white limestone, is a notable tourist destination in the city. It is the only university in the state to be a member of the Group of Eight, as well as the Sandstone universities. It is also the state's only university to have produced a Nobel Laureate: Barry Marshall, who graduated with a Bachelor of Medicine, Bachelor of Surgery in 1975 and was awarded a joint Nobel Prize in physiology or medicine in 2005 with Robin Warren.

Curtin University, previously known as Western Australian Institute of Technology (1966–1986) and Curtin University of Technology (1986–2010), is Western Australia's largest university by student population.

Murdoch University was founded in 1973 and incorporates Western Australia's only veterinary school and, until its controversial closure in 2020, Australia's only theology program to be completely integrated into a secular university.

Edith Cowan University was established in 1991 from the existing Western Australian College of Advanced Education which itself was formed on 11 December 1981 from the existing Teachers Colleges at Claremont, Nedlands, Churchlands and Mount Lawley after Graylands had merged into Claremont, Churchlands and Mount Lawley in 1979. It incorporates the Western Australian Academy of Performing Arts.

The University of Notre Dame Australia was established in 1990. Notre Dame was established as a Catholic university with its lead campus in Fremantle and a large campus in Sydney, and a campus in Broome. Its lead campus is in the west end of Fremantle, using historic port buildings built in the 1890s, giving Notre Dame a distinct European university atmosphere.

The Melbourne-based University of Divinity established a campus in Perth in 2022 through its admission of Wollaston College, the theological college of the Anglican Diocese of Perth, as a collegiate college of the university.

Colleges of TAFE provide trade and vocational training, including certificate- and diploma-level courses. TAFE began as a system of technical colleges and schools under the Education Department, from which they were separated in the 1980s and ultimately formed into regional colleges. Two are in the Perth metropolitan area: North Metropolitan TAFE (formerly Central Institute of Technology and West Coast Institute of Training); and South Metropolitan TAFE (formerly Polytechnic West and Challenger Institute of Technology).

== Media ==
=== Newspapers ===
The main newspapers for Perth are The West Australian and The Sunday Times. Localised free community papers cater to each local government area. The local business paper is Western Australian Business News.

=== Radio ===
Radio stations are on AM, FM and DAB+ frequencies. ABC stations include ABC News, ABC Radio Perth, Radio National, ABC Classic and Triple J. The six local commercial stations are 6PR and 6IX on AM; Triple M, Nova 93.7, Mix 94.5 and Gold 96FM on FM. DAB+ has mostly the same as both AM and FM plus national stations from the ABC/SBS, Radar Radio and Novanation, along with local stations My Perth Digital, Hot Country Perth and 98five Christian radio. Major community radio stations include RTRFM, Sonshine FM, SportFM and Curtin FM.

=== Television ===
Perth is served by thirty digital free-to-air television channels:

- ABC TV
- ABC TV HD (ABC TV broadcast in HD)
- ABC Family
- ABC Entertains
- ABC News
- SBS
- SBS HD (SBS broadcast in HD)
- SBS Viceland
- SBS World Movies
- SBS Food
- NITV
- SBS WorldWatch
- Seven
- 7HD (Seven broadcast in HD)
- 7two
- 7mate
- 7mate HD (7mate broadcast in HD)
- 7Bravo
- 7flix
- TVSN
- Racing.com
- Nine
- 9HD (Nine broadcast in HD)
- 9Gem
- 9Gem HD (9Gem broadcast in HD)
- 9Go!
- 9Life
- 9GemHD
- 9Rush
- 9Go!HD
- 10
- 10 HD (10 broadcast in HD)
- 10 Drama (only in HD)
- 10 Comedy
- Nickelodeon
- You.tv
- Gecko TV (formerly Spree TV)

ABC, SBS, Seven, Nine and 10 were also broadcast in an analogue format until 16 April 2013, when the analogue transmission was switched off. Community station Access 31 closed in August 2008. In April 2010 a new community station, West TV, began transmission (in digital format only). West TV ceased broadcasting in February 2020.

Foxtel provides a subscription-based satellite and cable television service. Perth has its own local newsreaders on ABC (Pamela Medlen), Seven (Rick Ardon, Susannah Carr), Nine (Michael Thomson, Monika Kos) and Ten (Natalie Forrest).

An annual telethon has been broadcast since 1968 to raise funds for charities including Princess Margaret Hospital for Children. The 24-hour Perth Telethon claims to be "the most successful fundraising event per capita in the world".

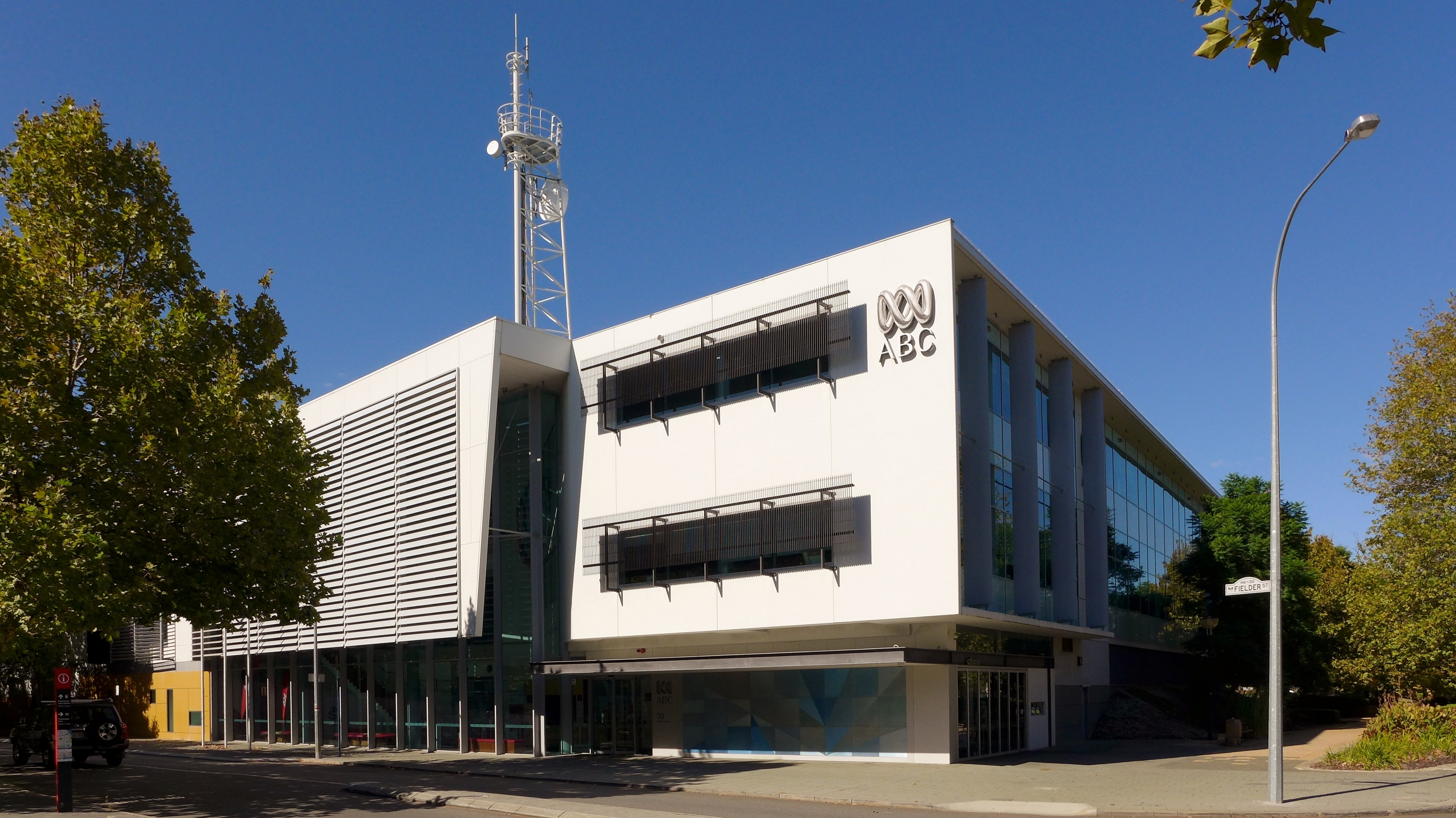
ABC Perth studios in East Perth, home of ABC Radio Perth radio and ABC television in Western Australia

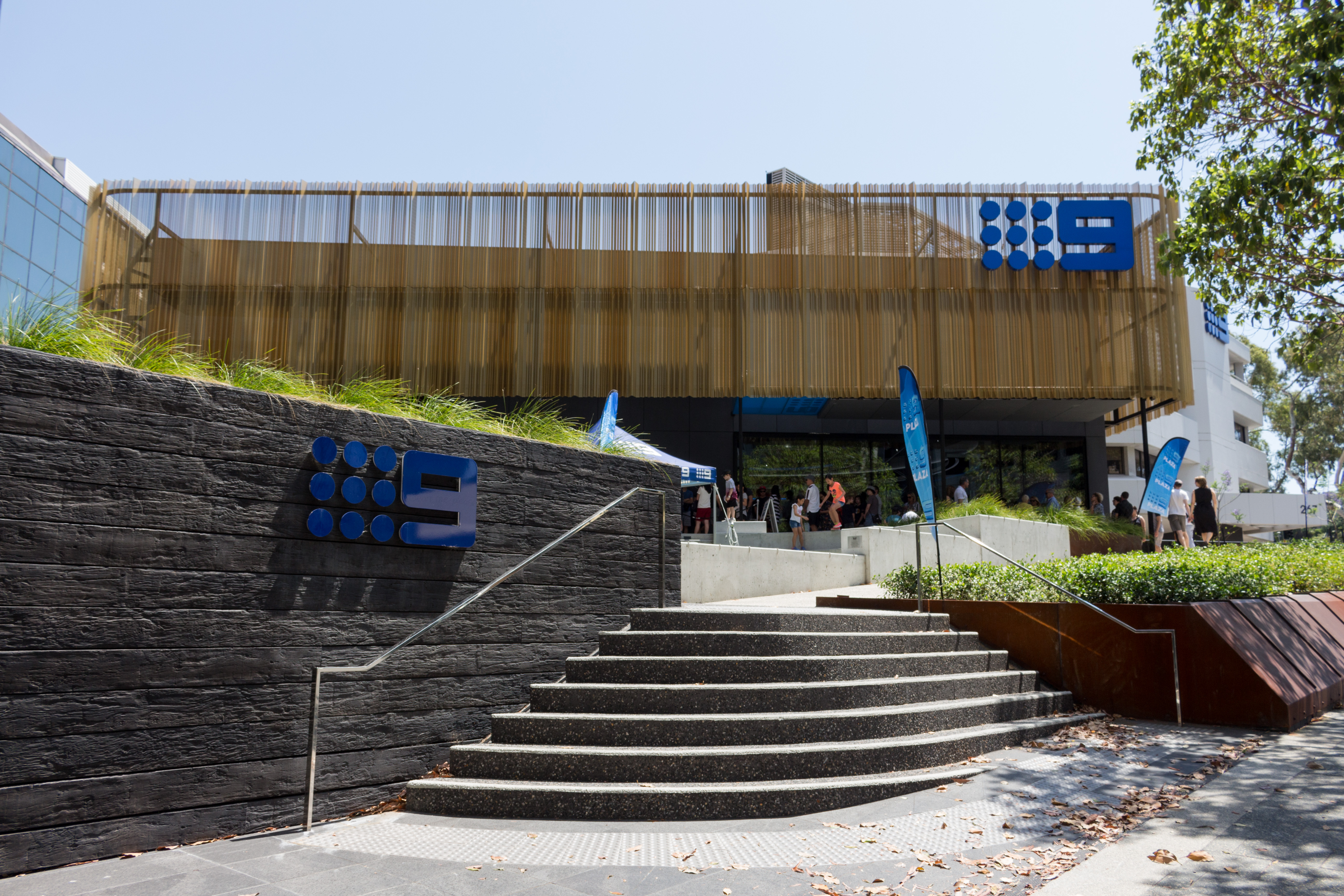
Channel 9's Perth studio

=== Online-only ===
Online news media outlets covering the Perth area include TheWest.com.au backed by The West Australian, Perth Now from the newsroom of The Sunday Times, and WAToday from Nine Entertainment.

== Culture ==
=== Arts and entertainment ===
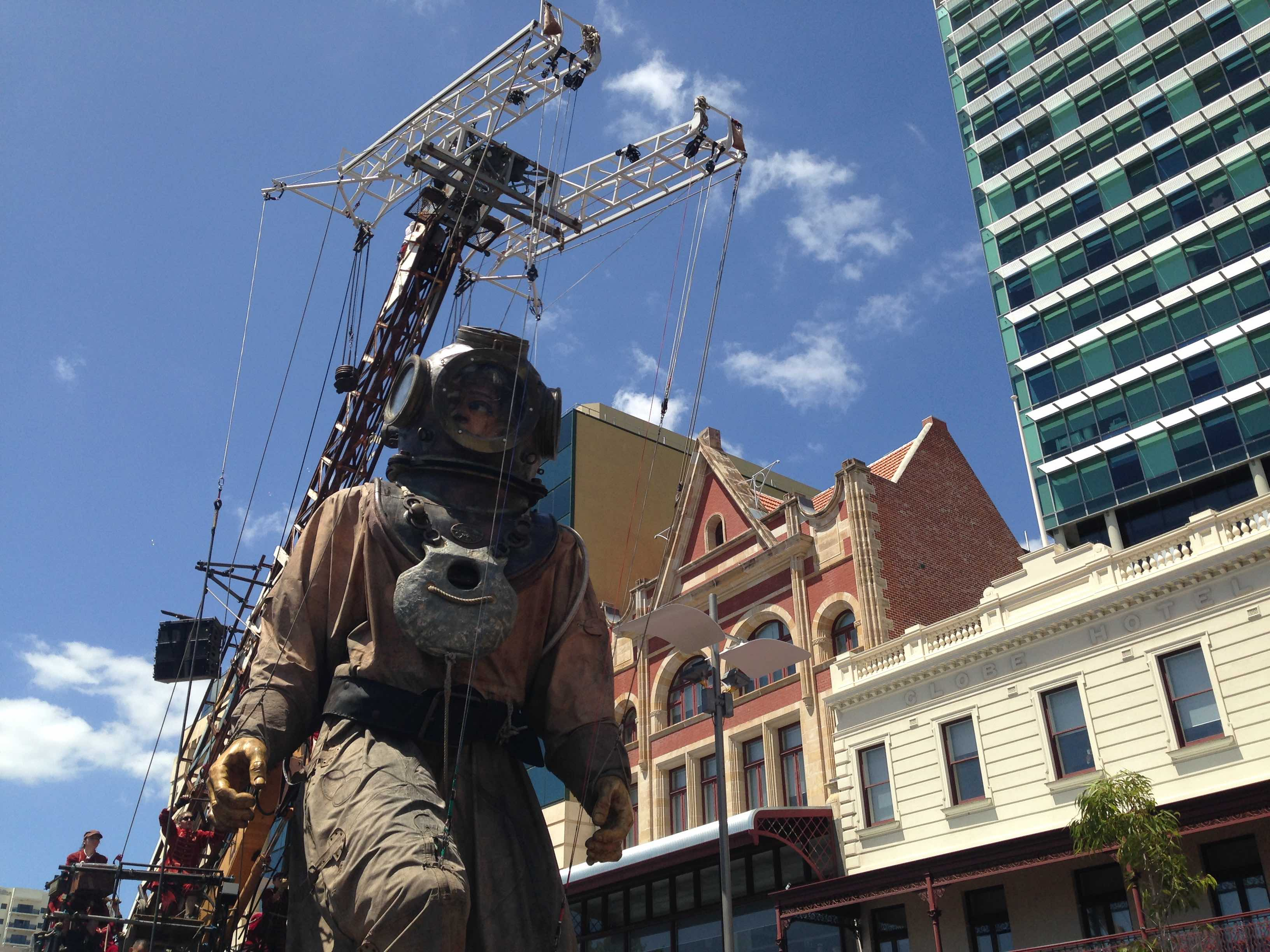
Scene from the inauguration of the 2015 Perth Festival, Australia's oldest continuously running cultural festival

A number of cultural events are held in Perth. Held annually since 1953, Perth Festival is Australia's longest running annual cultural festival and includes the Perth Writers Festival and the Winter Arts Festival. The Fringe World Festival has been held annually across January and February in Perth since 2012. Perth also hosts annual music festivals including Listen Out, Origin and St Jerome's Laneway Festival. The Perth International Comedy Festival features a variety of local and international comedic talent, with performances held at the Astor Theatre and nearby venues in Mount Lawley. Regular night food market events are held during the summer months throughout the Perth CBD and surrounding suburbs. Sculpture by the Sea showcases a range of local and international sculptors' creations along Cottesloe Beach. There is also a wide variety of public art and sculptures on permanent display across the city.

The Perth Cultural Centre is home to many of the city's major arts, cultural and educational institutions, including the Art Gallery of Western Australia, Western Australian Museum, State Library of Western Australia, State Records Office and Perth Institute of Contemporary Arts (PICA). The State Theatre Centre of Western Australia is also located there, and is the home of the Black Swan State Theatre Company. Other performing arts companies based in Perth include the West Australian Ballet, the West Australian Opera and the West Australian Symphony Orchestra, all of which present regular programs. The Western Australian Youth Orchestras provide young musicians with performance opportunities in orchestral and other musical ensembles.

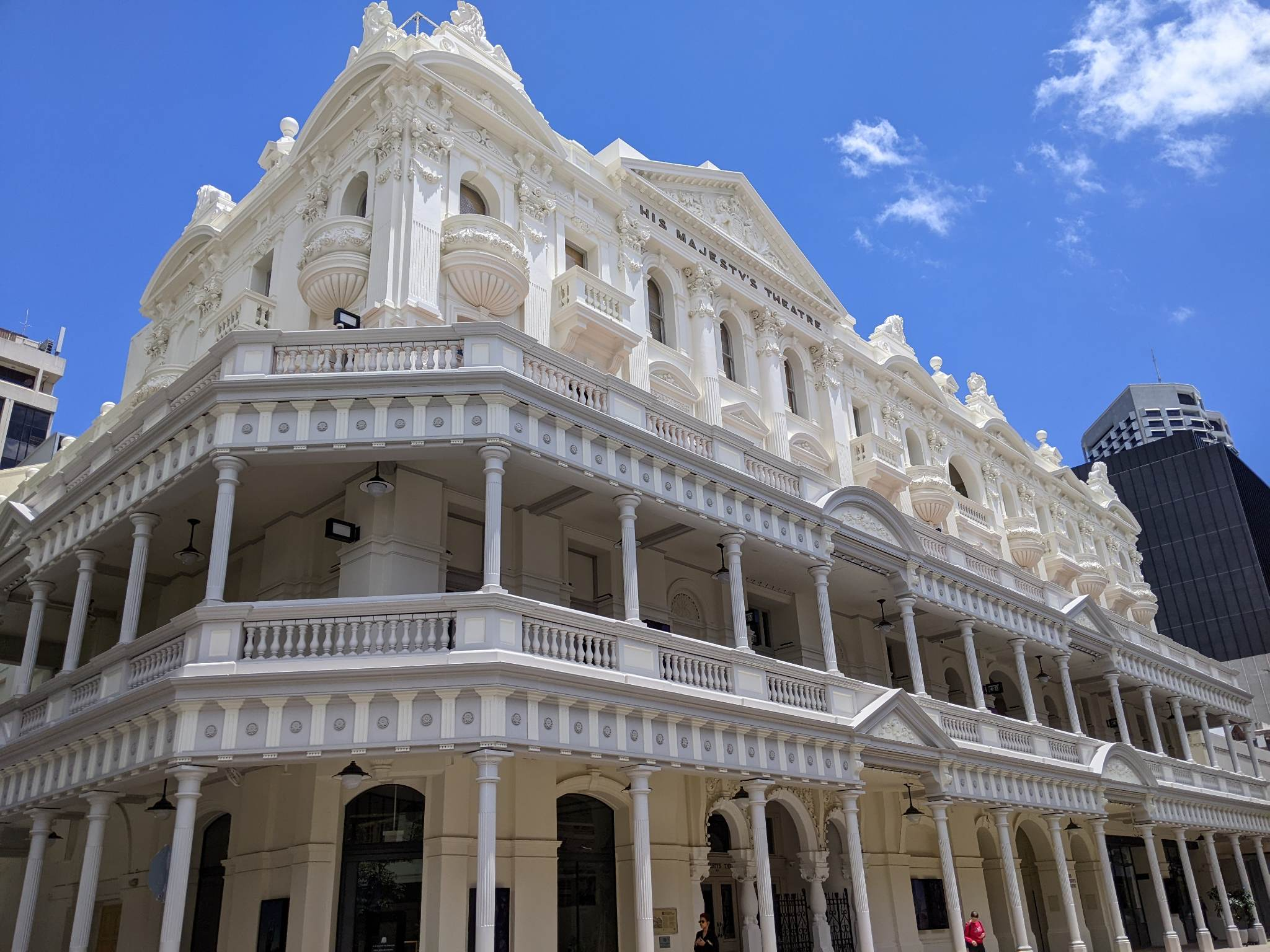
His Majesty's Theatre

Perth is also home to the Western Australian Academy of Performing Arts at Edith Cowan University, from which many actors and broadcasters have launched their careers. The city's main performance venues include the Riverside Theatre within the Perth Convention & Exhibition Centre, the Perth Concert Hall, the historic His Majesty's Theatre, the Regal Theatre in Subiaco and the Astor Theatre in Mount Lawley. Perth Arena can be configured as an entertainment or sporting arena, and concerts are also hosted at other sporting venues, including Perth Stadium, Perth High Performance Centre and Perth Rectangular Stadium. Outdoor concert venues include Quarry Amphitheatre, Supreme Court Gardens, Kings Park and Russell Square.

The largest performance area within the State Theatre Centre, the Heath Ledger Theatre, is named in honour of Perth-born film actor Heath Ledger. Other performers from Perth include Judy Davis, Melissa George, Tim Minchin, Lisa McCune, Troye Sivan, Sam Worthington and Isla Fisher. Performers that studied in Perth at the Western Australian Academy of Performing Arts include Hugh Jackman and Lisa McCune.

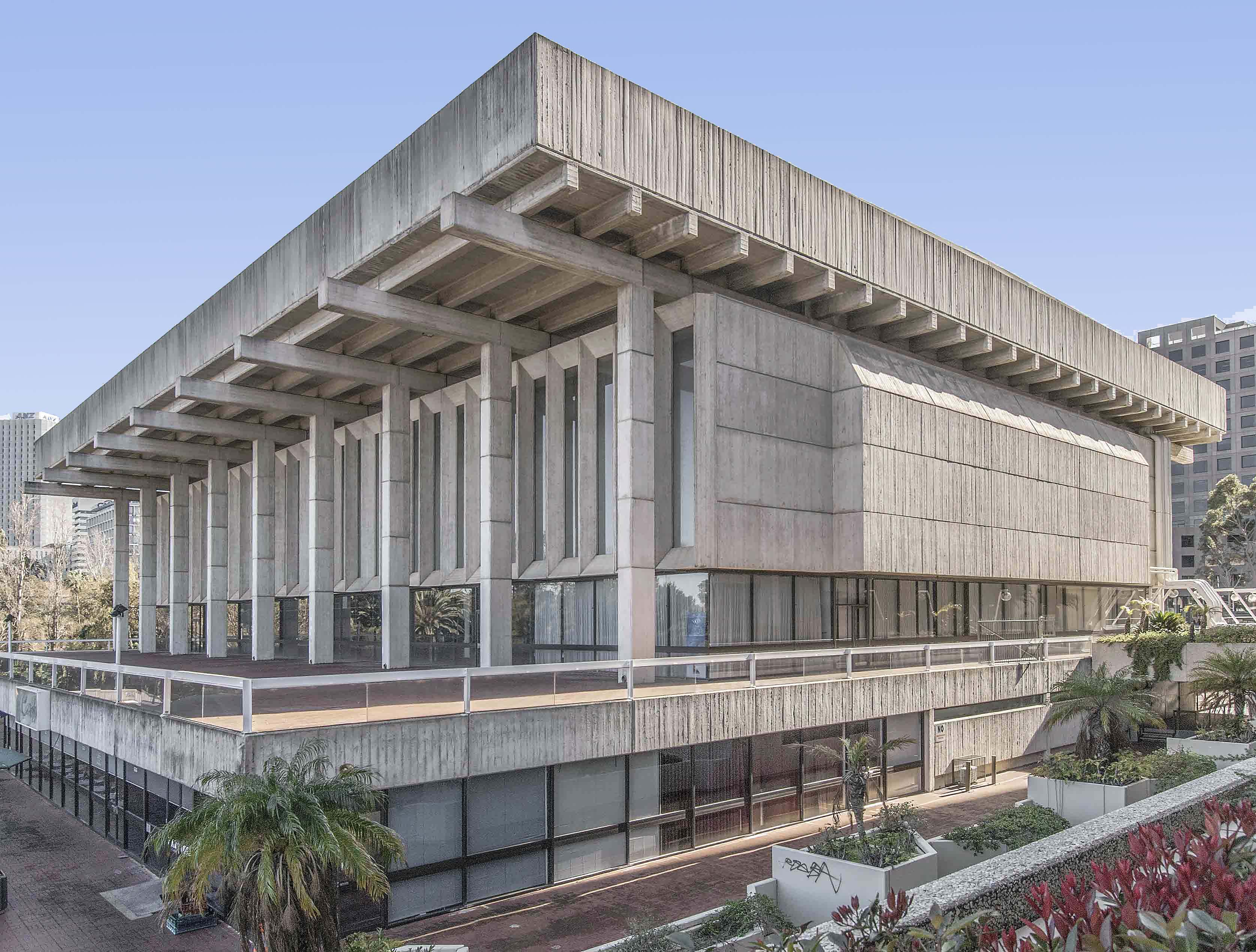
Perth Concert Hall

Due to Perth's relative isolation from other Australian cities, overseas performing artists sometimes exclude it from their Australian tour schedules. This isolation, however, is considered a key factor in the development of a distinct and tight-knit music scene in Perth, with many bands and artists hailing from the city. Famous musical performers from Perth include the late AC/DC frontman Bon Scott, whose heritage-listed grave at Fremantle Cemetery is reportedly the most visited grave in Australia. Further notable music acts from Perth include The Triffids, The Scientists, The Drones, Tame Impala, Karnivool, Spacey Jane, and Pendulum.

Perth has inspired various artistic and cultural works. John Boyle O'Reilly, a Fenian convict transported to Western Australia, published Moondyne in 1879, the most famous early novel about the Swan River Colony. Perth is also the setting for various works by novelist Tim Winton, most notably Cloudstreet (1991). Songs that refer to the city include "I Love Perth" (1996) by Pavement, "Perth" (2011) by Bon Iver, and "Perth" (2015) by Beirut. Films shot or set in Perth include Japanese Story (2003), These Final Hours (2013), Kill Me Three Times (2014) and Paper Planes (2015). A dedicated screen production facility, Perth Film Studios, opened in January 2026.

=== Tourism and recreation ===
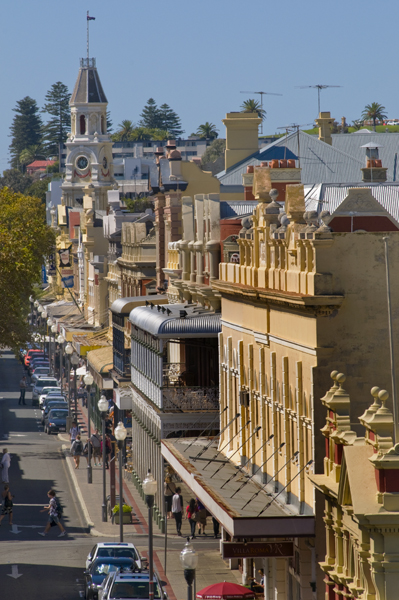
The Fremantle West End Heritage area is home to hundreds of Victorian and Edwardian era buildings.

Tourism is an important part of Perth's economy, with approximately 2.8 million domestic visitors and 0.7 million international visitors in the year ending March 2012. Tourist attractions are generally focused around the city centre, Fremantle, the coast and the Swan River. In addition to the Perth Cultural Centre, there are dozens of museums across the city. The Scitech Discovery Centre in West Perth is an interactive science museum, with regularly changing exhibitions on a large range of science and technology-based subjects. Scitech also conducts live science demonstration shows and operates the adjacent Horizon planetarium. The WA Maritime Museum in Fremantle displays maritime objects from all eras. It houses Australia II, the yacht that won the 1983 America's Cup, as well as a former Royal Australian Navy submarine. Also in Fremantle is the Army Museum of Western Australia, situated within a historic artillery barracks. The museum consists of several galleries that reflect the Army's involvement in Western Australia and the military service of Western Australians. The museum holds numerous items of significance, including three Victoria Crosses. Aviation history is represented by the Aviation Heritage Museum in Bull Creek, with its significant collection of aircraft, including a Lancaster bomber and a Catalina of the type operated from the Swan River during WWII.

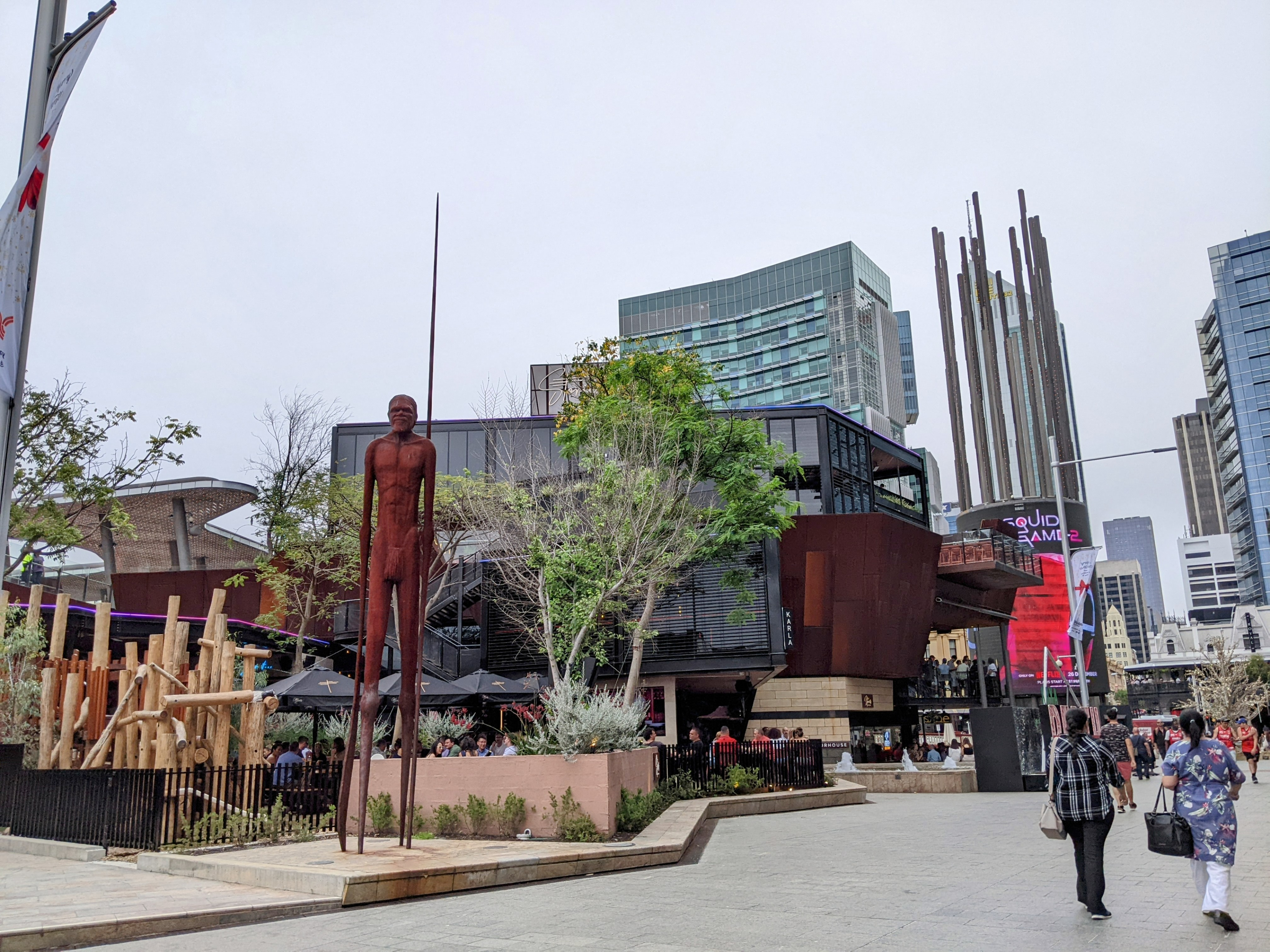
The "Wirin" sculpture at Yagan Square

There are many heritage sites in Perth's CBD, Fremantle and other parts of the metropolitan areas. Some of the oldest remaining buildings, dating back to the 1830s, include the Round House in Fremantle, the Old Mill in South Perth, and the Old Court House in the city centre. Registers of important buildings are maintained by the Heritage Council of Western Australia and local governments. A late heritage building is the Perth Mint. Yagan Square connects Northbridge and the Perth CBD, with a 45-metre-high digital tower and the 9-metre statue Wirin designed by Noongar artist Tjyllyungoo. Elizabeth Quay is also a notable attraction in Perth, featuring Swan Bells, a panoramic view of Swan River, and the sculpture Spanda by artist Christian de Vietri.

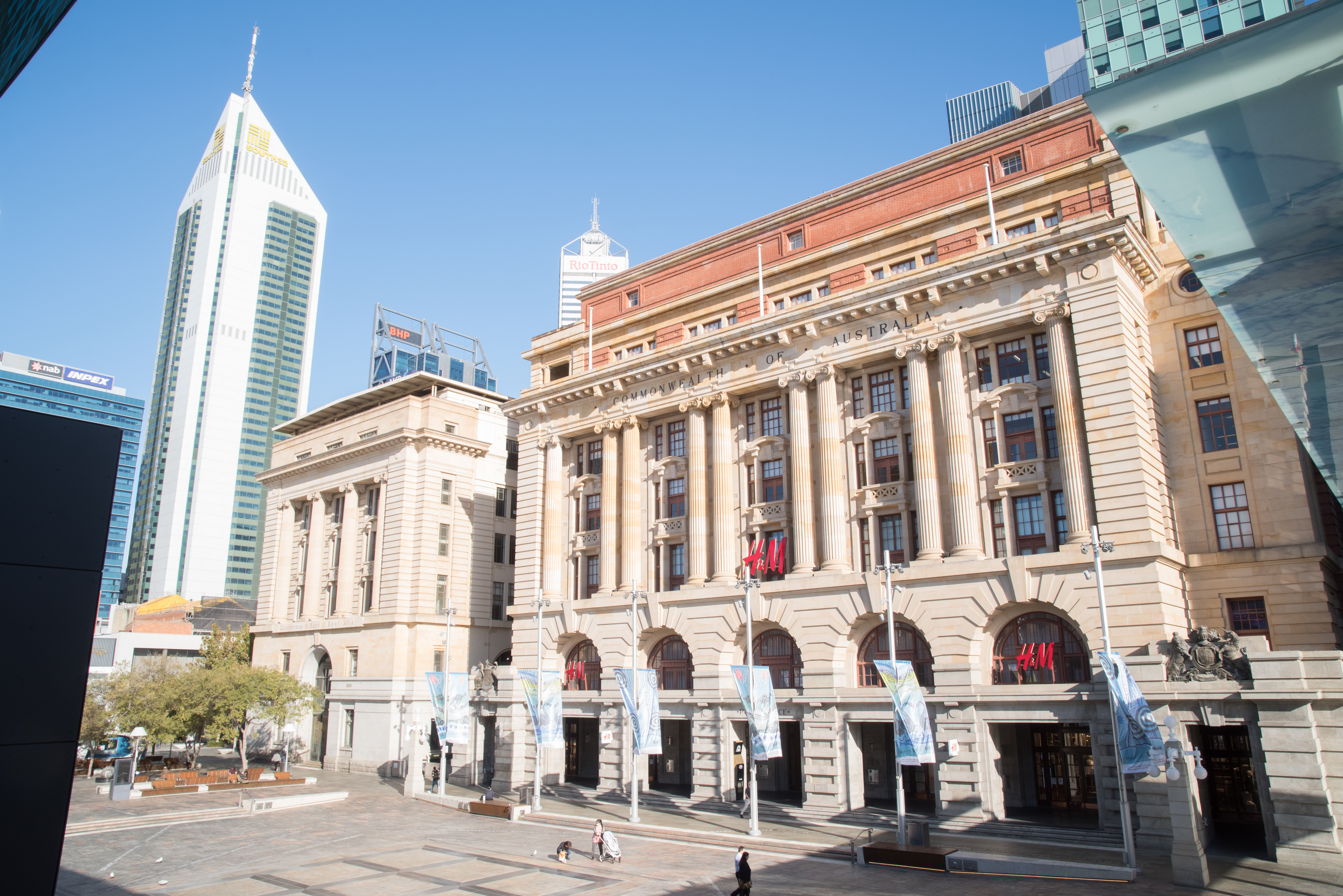
Forrest Place, a major pedestrian thoroughfare

Retail shopping in the Perth CBD is focused around Murray Street and Hay Street. Both these streets are pedestrian malls between William Street and Barrack Street. Forrest Place is another pedestrian mall, connecting the Murray Street mall to Wellington Street and the Perth railway station. A number of arcades run between Hay Street and Murray Street, including the Piccadilly Arcade, which housed the Piccadilly Cinema until it closed in late 2013. Other shopping precincts include Watertown in West Perth, featuring factory outlets for major brands, the historically significant Fremantle Markets, which date to 1897, and the Midland townsite on Great Eastern Highway, combining historic development around the Town Hall and Post Office buildings with the modern Midland Gate shopping centre further east. Joondalup's central business district is largely a shopping and retail area lined with townhouses and apartments, and also features Lakeside Joondalup. Joondalup was granted the status of "tourism precinct" by the State Government in 2009, allowing for extended retail trading hours.

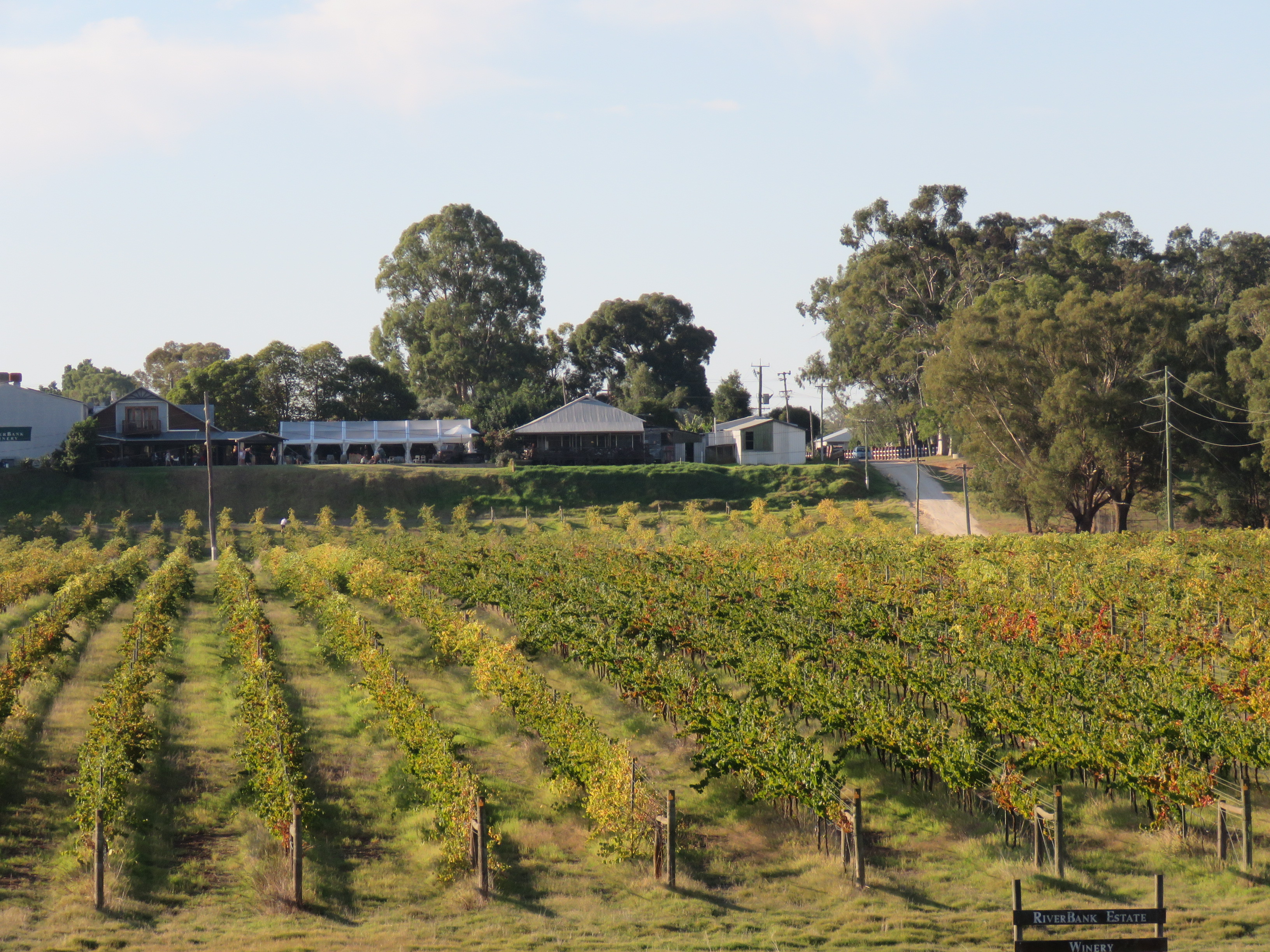
Riverbank Estate Winery, Caversham in the Swan Valley

Restaurants, bars and nightclubs can be found in the entertainment hubs of Northbridge (just north of the Perth CBD), the west end of the CBD itself, Elizabeth Quay, Leederville, Beaufort Street, Scarborough and Fremantle. The Crown casino and resort is located at Burswood.

The Swan Valley, with fertile soil, uncommon in the Perth region, features numerous wineries, such as the large complex at Houghtons, the state's biggest producer, Sandalfords and many smaller operators, including microbreweries and rum distilleries. The Swan Valley also contains specialised food producers, many restaurants and cafes, and roadside local produce stalls that sell seasonal fruit throughout the year. Tourist Drive 203 is a circular route in the Swan Valley, passing by many attractions on West Swan Road and Great Northern Highway.

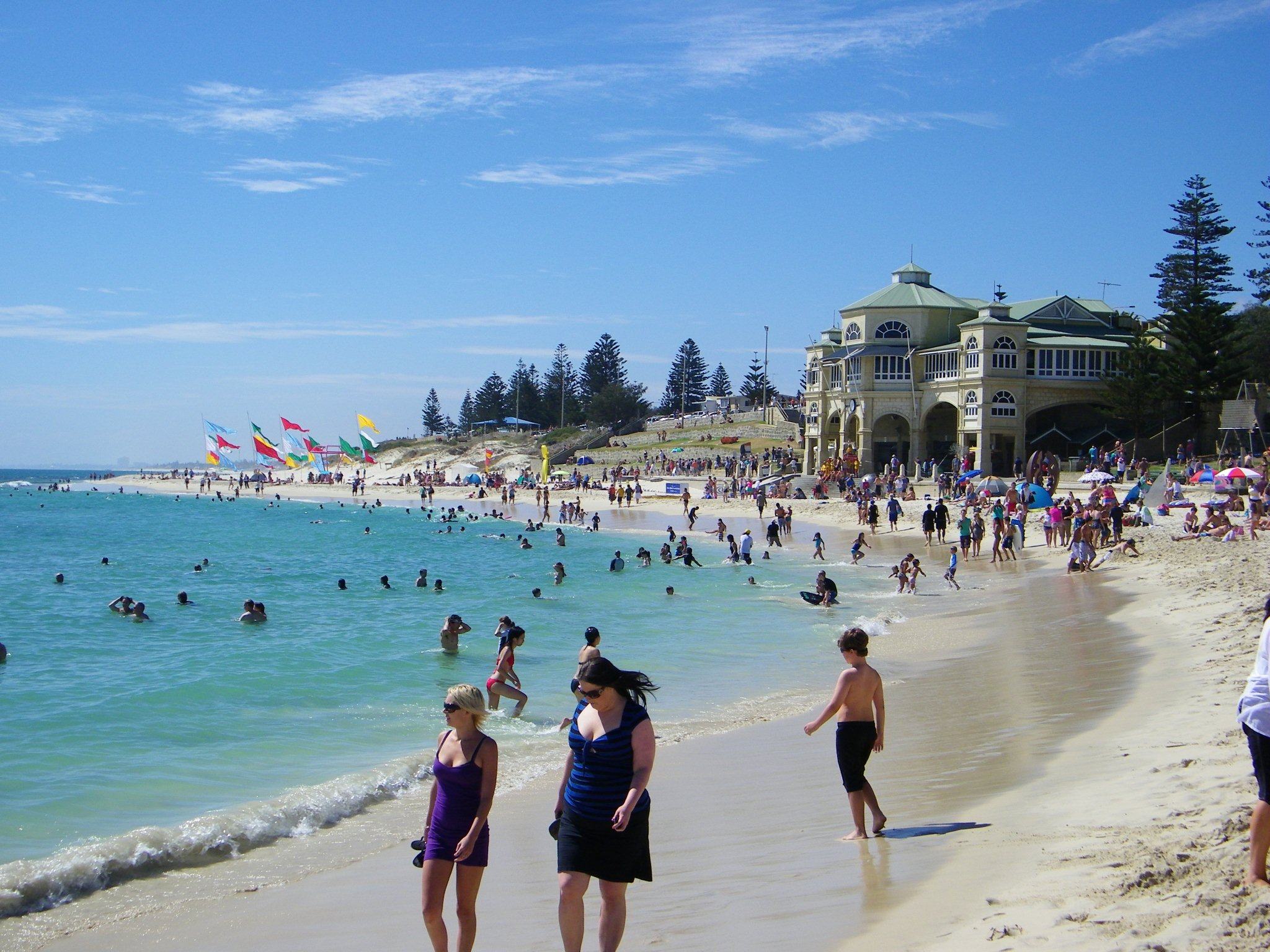
Cottesloe Beach is a notable attraction.

Kings Park, in central Perth between the CBD and the University of Western Australia, is one of the world's largest inner-city parks, at 400.6 hectares (990 acres). It has many landmarks and attractions, including the State War Memorial Precinct on Mount Eliza, Western Australian Botanic Garden and children's playgrounds. Other features include DNA Tower, a 15 m (49 ft) high double helix staircase that resembles the deoxyribonucleic acid (DNA) molecule, and Jacob's Ladder, comprising 242 steps that lead down to Mounts Bay Road.

Hyde Park is another inner-city park 2 km (1.2 mi) north of the CBD. It was gazetted as a public park in 1897, created from 15 ha (37 acres) of a chain of wetlands known as Third Swamp. Avon Valley, John Forrest and Yanchep national parks are areas of protected bushland at the northern and eastern edges of the metropolitan area. Within the city's northern suburbs is Whiteman Park, a 4,000-hectare (9,900-acre) bushland area, with bushwalking trails, bike paths, sports facilities, playgrounds, a vintage tramway, a light railway on a 6-kilometre (3.7 mi) track, motor and tractor museums, and Caversham Wildlife Park.

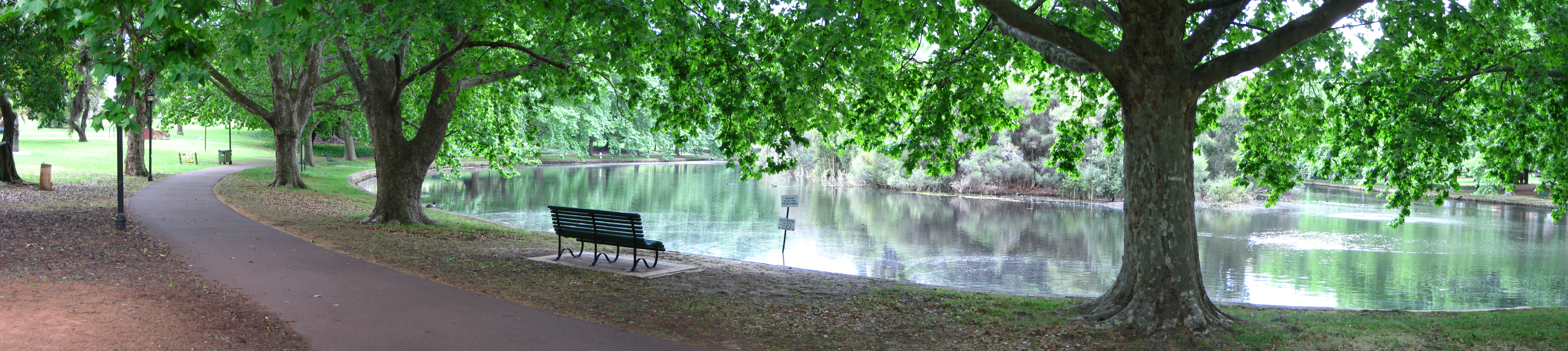
Hyde Park

Perth Zoo, in South Perth, houses a variety of Australian and exotic animals from around the globe. The zoo is home to highly successful breeding programs for orangutans and giraffes, and participates in captive breeding and reintroduction efforts for a number of Western Australian species, including the numbat, the dibbler, the chuditch and the western swamp tortoise.

More wildlife can be observed at the Aquarium of Western Australia in Hillarys, Australia's largest aquarium, specialising in marine animals that inhabit the 12,000-kilometre-long (7,500 mi) western coast of Australia. The northern Perth section of the coastline is known as Sunset Coast; it includes numerous beaches and the Marmion Marine Park, a protected area inhabited by tropical fish, Australian sea lions and bottlenose dolphins, and traversed by humpback whales. Tourist Drive 204, also known as Sunset Coast Tourist Drive, is a designated route from North Fremantle to Iluka along coastal roads.

== Sport ==
The climate of Perth allows for extensive outdoor sporting activity, and this is reflected in the wide variety of sports available to residents of the city. Perth was host to the 1962 Commonwealth Games and the 1987 America's Cup defence (based at Fremantle). Australian rules football is the most popular spectator sport in Perth—nearly 23% of Western Australians attended a match at least once in 2009–2010. The two Australian Football League teams located in Perth, the West Coast Eagles and the Fremantle Football Club, have two of the largest fan bases in the country. The Eagles, the older club, was until recently, one of the most successful teams in the league, and one of the largest sporting clubs in Australia. The next level of football is the Western Australian Football League, comprising nine clubs each having a League, Reserves and Colts team. Each of these clubs has a junior football system for ages 7 to 17. The next level of Australian rules football is the Perth Football League, comprising 68 clubs servicing senior footballers within the metropolitan area. Other popular sports include cricket, basketball, soccer, rugby league, motorsport and rugby union.

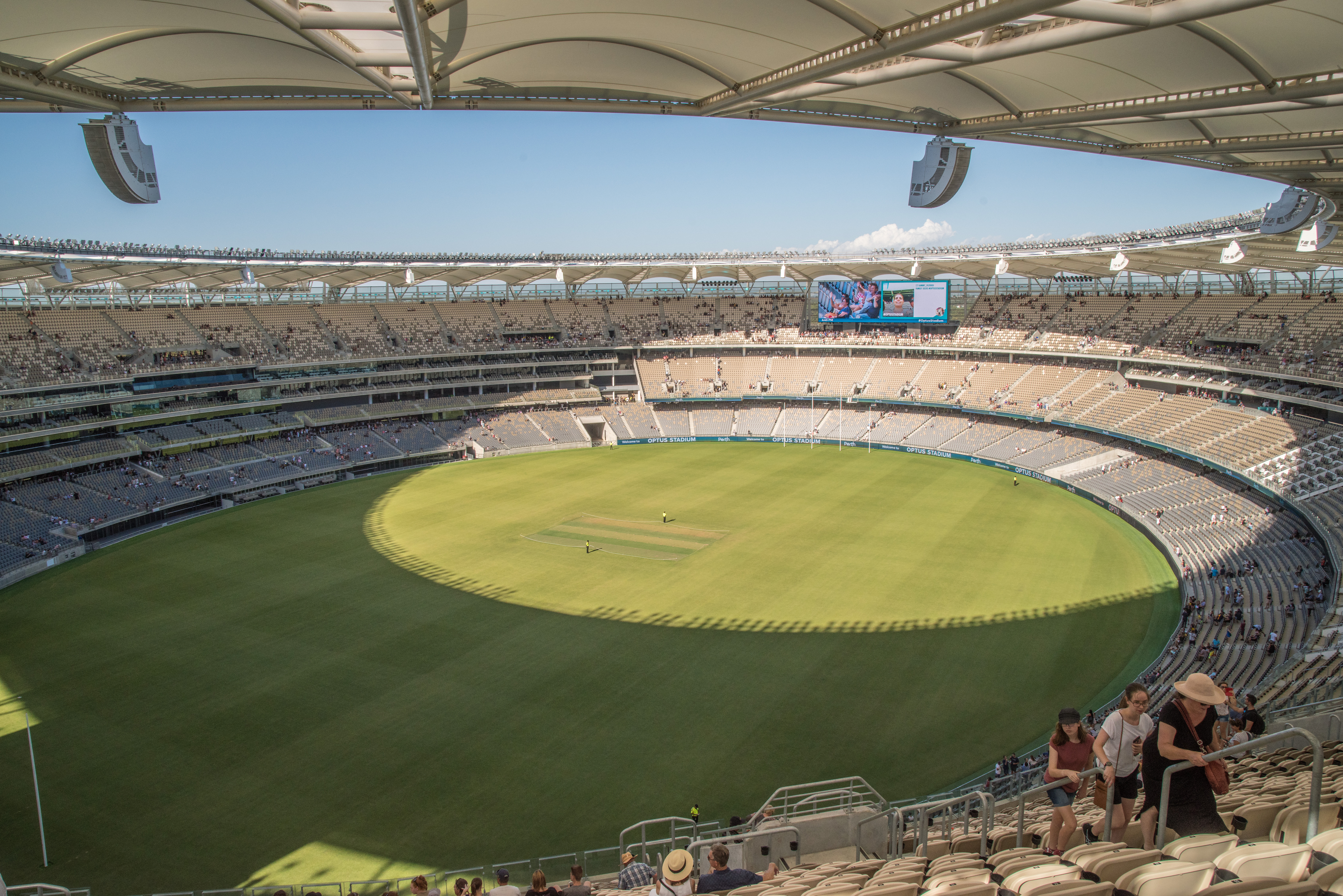
Perth Stadium hosts cricket and Australian rules football, Perth's most popular spectator sports.

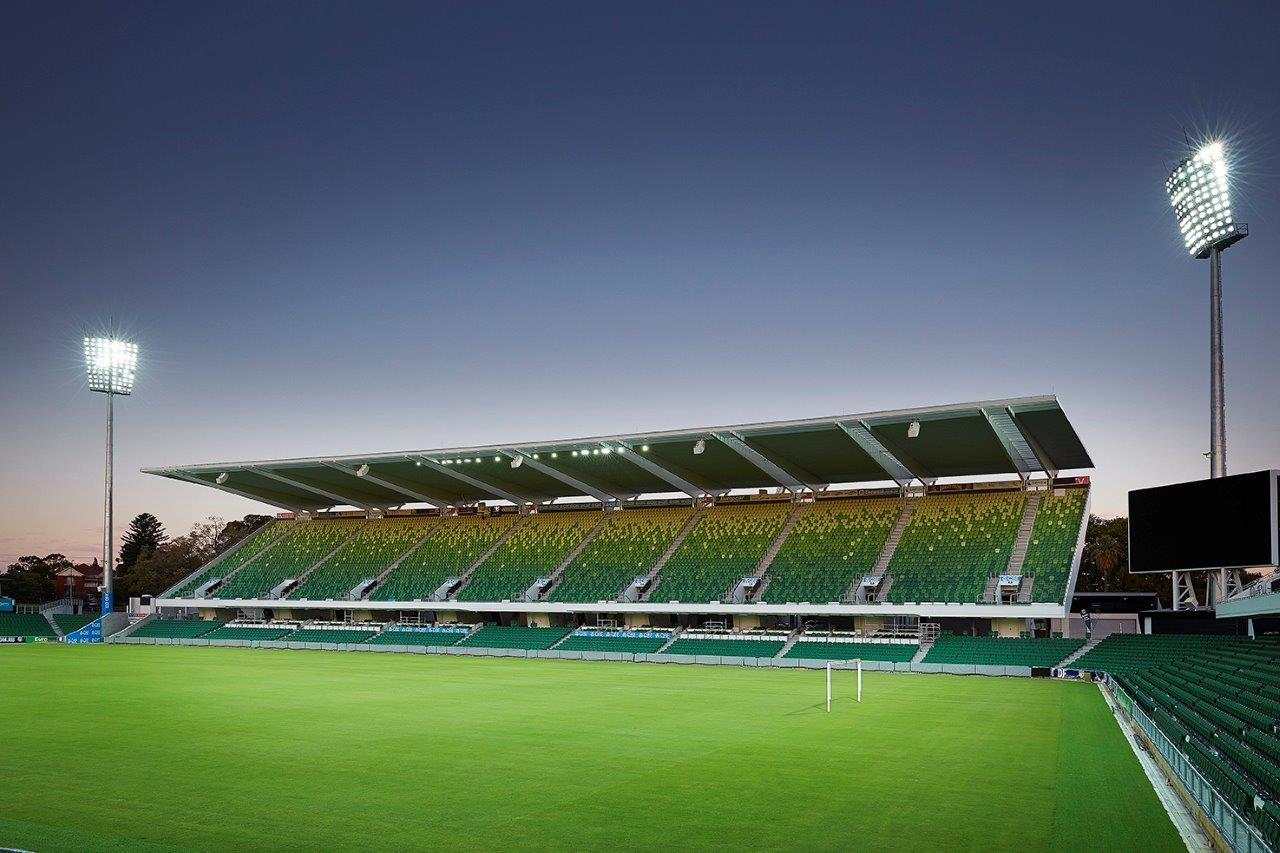
HBF Park hosts rugby league, rugby union and soccer.

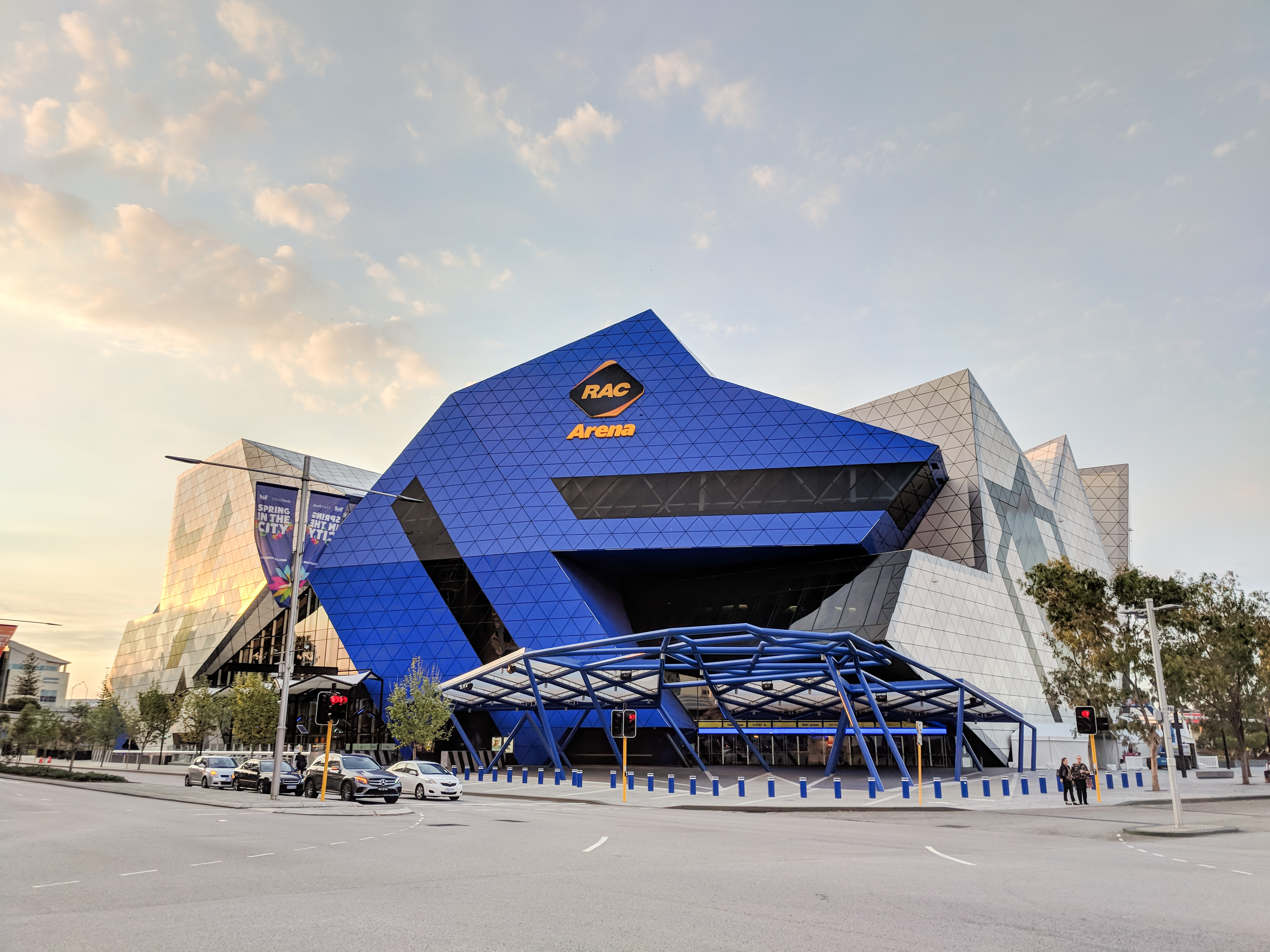
The exterior of Perth Arena

Active sports teams in Perth
Club	League	Sport	Venue	Established
Fremantle Dockers	AFL/AFL Women's	Australian rules football	Optus Stadium	1994
West Coast Eagles	AFL/AFL Women's/WAFL	Australian rules football	Optus Stadium	1986
Perth Bears	NRL	Rugby League	HBF Park	1908
Perth Wildcats	National Basketball League	Basketball	RAC Arena	1982
Perth Lynx	Women's NBL	Basketball	Bendat Basketball Centre	1988
Perth Glory	A-League Men	Soccer	HBF Park	1995
Perth Glory Women	A-League Women	Soccer	Macedonia Park; HBF Park	2008
Western Force	Super Rugby	Rugby union	HBF Park	2005
Western Force Super W	Super W	Rugby union	Harvey Field; Kingsway Reserve	2018
Perth Heat	Australian Baseball League	Baseball	Harley-Davidson Ballpark	1989
West Coast Fever	Super Netball	Netball	RAC Arena	1997
West Coast Pirates	S.G. Ball Cup	Rugby league	HBF Park	2012
Western Australia Men	Sheffield Shield	Cricket	WACA Ground	1893
Perth Scorchers	Big Bash/Women's Big Bash	Cricket	Optus Stadium	2011
Western Australia Women	Women's National Cricket League	Cricket	WACA Ground	1934
Perth Inferno	Australian Women's Ice Hockey League	Ice hockey	Cockburn Ice Arena	2016
Perth Thunder	Australian Ice Hockey League	Ice hockey	Perth Ice Arena	2010
Perth Thundersticks	Hockey One	Field hockey	Perth Hockey Stadium	2019
Perth Steel	AVSL	Volleyball	Multiple	2012

Perth has hosted numerous state and international sporting events. Ongoing international events include the ATP Cup (replacing the Hopman Cup in 2020) during the first week of January at the Perth Arena, and the Perth International golf tournament at Lake Karrinyup Country Club. In addition to these Perth has hosted the Rally Australia of the World Rally Championships from 1989 to 2006, international rugby union games, including qualifying and pool stage matches for the 2003 Rugby World Cup and the Bledisloe Cup in 2019. The 1991 and 1998 FINA World Championships were held in Perth. Four races (2006, 2007, 2008 and 2010) in the Red Bull Air Race World Championship have been held on a stretch of the Swan River called Perth Water, using Langley Park as a temporary airfield. Several motorsport facilities exist in Perth including Perth Motorplex, catering to drag racing and speedway, and Wanneroo Raceway for circuit racing and drifting, which hosts a V8 Supercars round. Perth also has two thoroughbred racing facilities: Ascot, home of the Railway Stakes and Perth Cup; and Belmont Park. Daniel Ricciardo is a Perth-born Formula 1 driver who most recently raced for the Visa Cash App RB Formula One Team from 2023 to 2024 and previously from 2012 to 2013 when the team was known as Scuderia Toro Rosso, having also raced for Red Bull Racing, Renault and McLaren, respectively.

The WACA Ground opened in the 1890s and has hosted Test cricket since 1970. The Western Australian Athletics Stadium opened in 2009.

== Infrastructure ==
=== Health ===
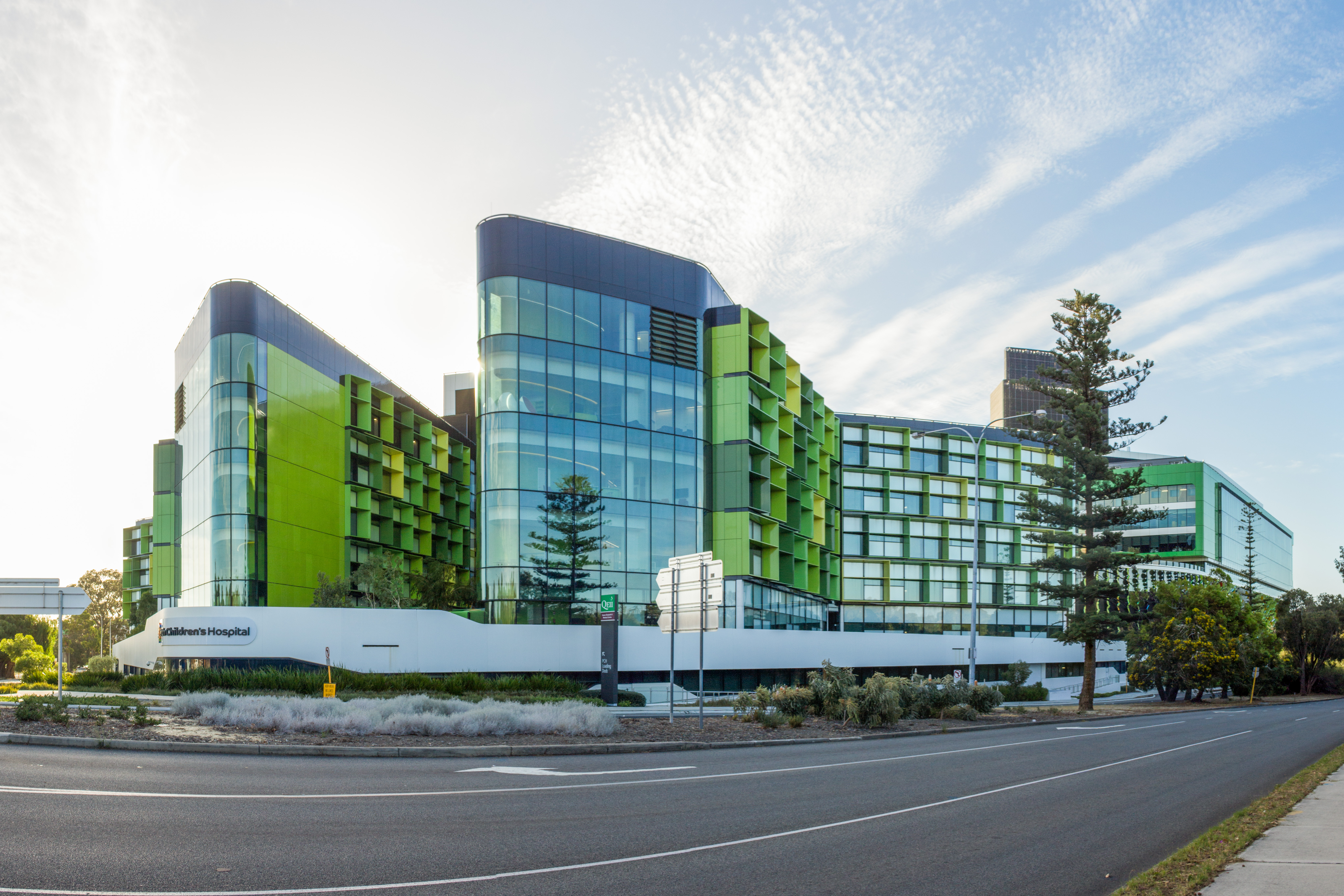
Perth Children's Hospital

Perth has ten large hospitals with emergency departments. As of 2013, Royal Perth Hospital in the city centre is the largest, with others spread around the metropolitan area: Armadale Health Service, Joondalup Health Campus, King Edward Memorial Hospital for Women in Subiaco, Rockingham General Hospital, Sir Charles Gairdner Hospital in Nedlands, St John of God Murdoch and Subiaco Hospitals, Midland Health Campus in Midland, and Fiona Stanley Hospital in Murdoch. Perth Children's Hospital is the state's only specialist children's hospital, and Graylands Hospital is the only public stand-alone psychiatric teaching hospital. Most of these are public hospitals, with some operating under public-private partnerships. St John of God Murdoch and Subiaco Hospitals, and Hollywood Hospital are large privately owned and operated hospitals.

A number of other public and private hospitals operate in Perth.

=== Transport ===
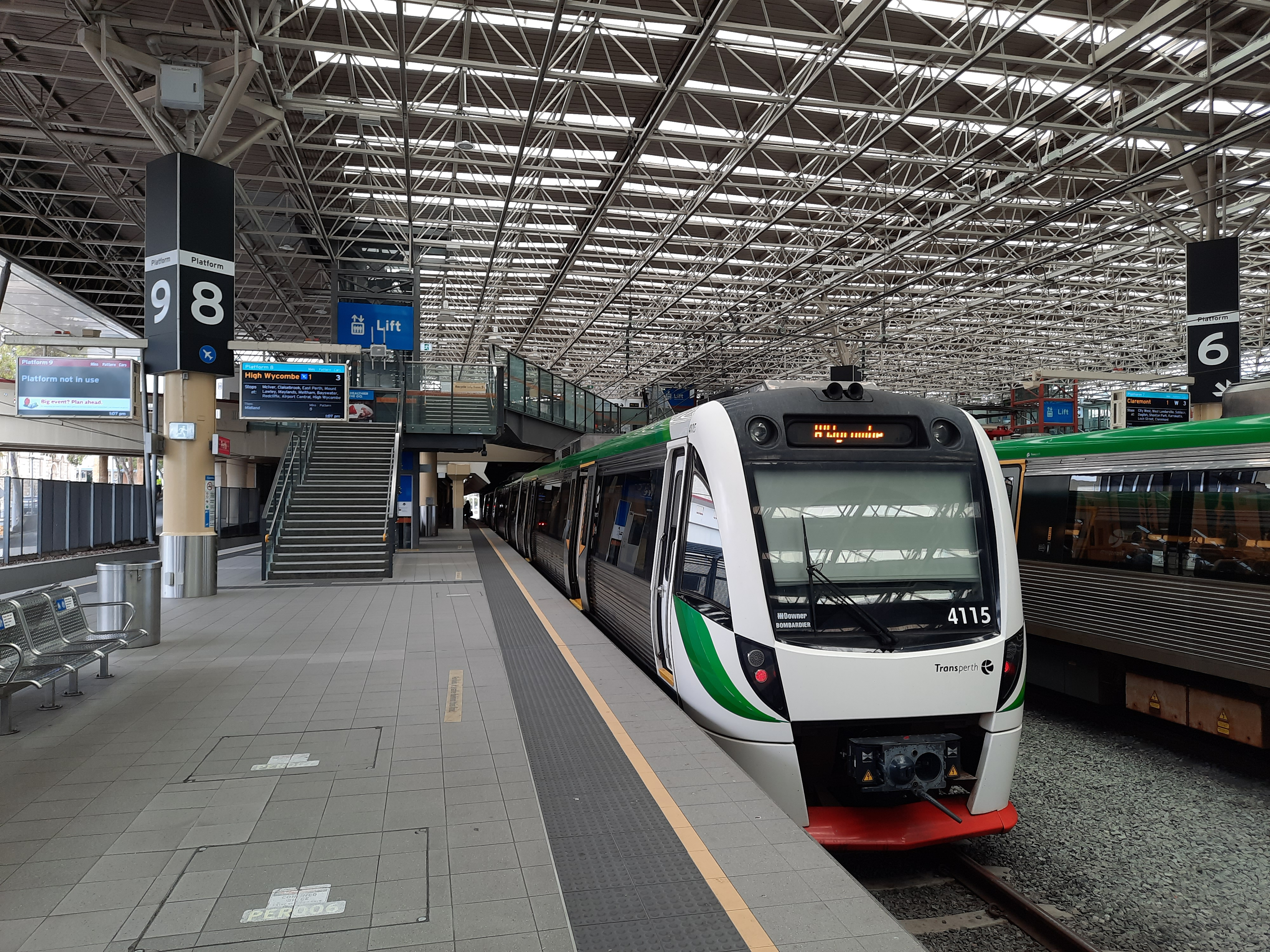
Transperth B-Series train at Perth railway station

==== Air ====
Perth is served by Perth Airport in the city's east for regional, domestic and international flights and Jandakot Airport in the city's southern suburbs for general aviation and charter flights.

==== Cycling ====
Cycling in Perth is common on the roads and paths for recreation, commuting and sport.

==== Driving ====
Perth has a road network with three freeways—Mitchell, Kwinana and Graham Farmer—and nine metropolitan highways. The Northbridge Tunnel, part of the Graham Farmer Freeway, is the only significant road tunnel in Perth.

==== Public transport (trains, buses, ferries) ====
Perth metropolitan public transport is known as Transperth, and includes trains, buses and ferries, which are provided by the Public Transport Authority. Links to rural areas provided by Transwa. There are 74 railway stations and 14 bus-only stations on the Transperth network.

Perth provides zero-fare bus and train trips around the city centre (the "Free Transit Zone"), including four high-frequency CAT bus routes.

The Indian Pacific passenger rail service connects Perth with Adelaide and Sydney once per week in each direction. The Prospector passenger rail service connects Perth with Kalgoorlie via several Wheatbelt towns, while the Australind connects to Bunbury, the MerredinLink connects to Merredin and the AvonLink connects to Northam.

Rail freight terminates at the Kewdale Rail Terminal, 15 km (9 mi) south-east of the city centre.

==== Sea ====
Perth's main container and passenger port is at Fremantle, 19 km (12 mi) south-west at the mouth of the Swan River. The Fremantle Outer Harbour at Cockburn Sound is one of Australia's major bulk cargo ports.

=== Utilities ===
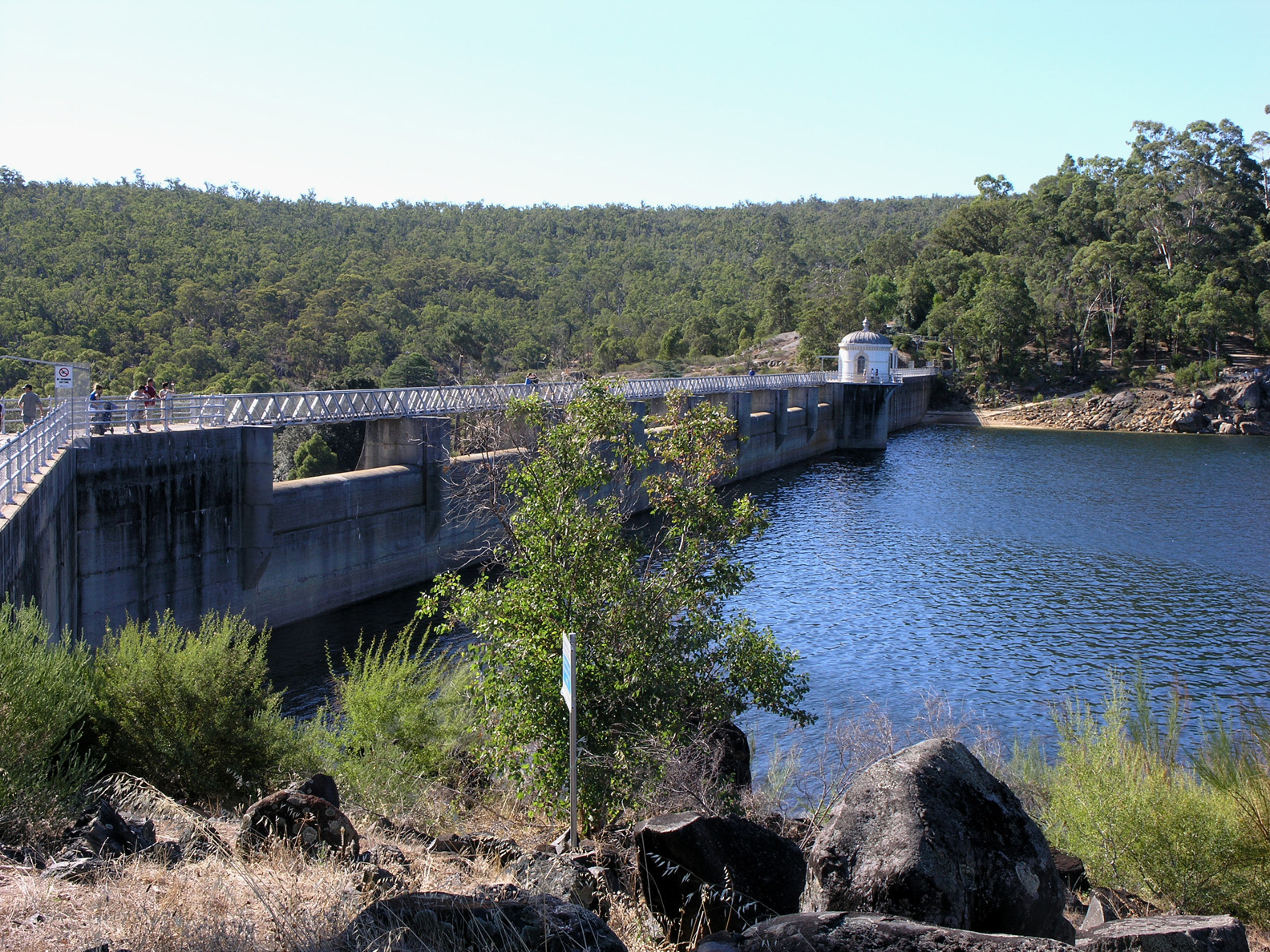
Mundaring Weir

Perth's electricity is predominantly generated, supplied and retailed by three Western Australian Government corporations. Verve Energy operates coal and gas power generation stations, as well as wind farms and other power sources. The physical network is maintained by Western Power, while Synergy, the state's largest energy retailer, sells electricity to residential and business customers.

Alinta Energy, which was previously a government owned company, had a monopoly in the domestic gas market since the 1990s. However, in 2013 Kleenheat Gas began operating in the market, allowing consumers to choose their gas retailer.

The Water Corporation is the dominant supplier of water, as well as wastewater and drainage services, in Perth and throughout Western Australia. It is also owned by the state government.

Perth's water supply has traditionally relied on both groundwater and rain-fed dams. Reduced rainfall in the region over recent decades had greatly lowered inflow to reservoirs and affected groundwater levels. Coupled with the city's relatively high growth rate, this led to concerns that Perth could run out of water in the near future. The Western Australian Government responded by building desalination plants, and introducing mandatory household sprinkler restrictions. The Kwinana Desalination Plant was opened in 2006, and Southern Seawater Desalination Plant at Binningup (on the coast between Mandurah and Bunbury) began operating in 2011. A trial winter (1 June – 31 August) sprinkler ban was introduced in 2009 by the State Government, a move which the Government later announced would be made permanent.

== See also ==
- 1955 Plan for the Metropolitan Region, Perth and Fremantle
- List of islands of Perth, Western Australia
- List of Perth suburbs
- List of tallest buildings in Perth

== Sources ==
- Brennan-Mills, Maddison (21 November 2026). "Geography Facts That'll Completely Ruin Every Map You've Ever Trusted". News.com.au. "Perth is closer to Jakarta than it is to Sydney: about 3010km versus 3290km. No wonder sandgropers say 'over east' like they need a passport, but spend every weekend in Bali."
