= List of public art in Western Australia =

There are numerous artworks on permanent public display in Western Australia.

This list include only works of public art accessible in an outdoor public space; it does not include artwork on display inside a museum. Most of the works mentioned are sculptures, although several notable memorials are listed also. Public art may include statues, sculptures, monuments, memorials, murals and mosaics.

In 1989 the Western Australian state government established a "Percent for Art" policy. The scheme which enacts the policy is administered by the Department of Culture and the Arts and requires that up to one percent of the construction budget for new public works over $2,000,000, be expended on public artwork. The Town of Vincent was the first Local government authority to have a similar scheme. It requires that "commercial, non-residential, and/or mixed residential/commercial developments over $1,000,000 are to set aside a minimum of one per cent of the estimated total project cost for the development to be used for public artworks." Over 700 works have been installed under the state government scheme since 1989.

== Perth CBD ==
Includes public artworks in the Perth CBD. Excludes the Northbridge precinct and the Perth Cultural Centre, Kings Park, East Perth and Claisebrook Cove.

| Name | Image | Location | Artist | Year |
|---|---|---|---|---|
| "Ascalon" | | St George's Cathedral, Perth | Marcus Canning, Christian de Vietri | 2009 |
| Percy Buttons' Aspiration | | Hay Street Mall, Perth | Joan Walsh-Smith & Charles Smith | 1996 |
| Aurelia Apartments | | South Perth | Jon Tarry | 2018 |
| Fusion Apartments | | Riversdale Road, Burswood | Jon Tarry | 2016 |
| Bessie Rischbieth Statue | | Elizabeth Quay 3D model | Jon Tarry | 2016 |
| Conic Fugue (Enigma) | | QV1 Building, Corner St Georges Terrace and Milligan Street, Perth | Charles O. Perry | 1991 |
| "Connect(us)" | | Kings Square, Perth | Warren Langley | 2016 |
| Sir Charles Court | | Corner Mount St and St Georges Terrace | Tony Jones | 2011 |
| "First Contact" | | Elizabeth Quay | Laurel Nannup | 2015 |
| "Footsteps in Time" | | 40–50 St Georges Terrace, Perth | Joan Walsh-Smith, Charles Smith | 2004 |
| Alexander Forrest | | Stirling Gardens entrance, Barrack Street and St Georges Terrace, Perth | Pietro Porcelli | 1916 |
| "Going Home" (Kangaroos with Briefcases) | | Florence Hummerston Reserve, Corner Mount Street and St Georges Terrace, Perth | Anne Neil | 1996 |
| "Grow Your Own" (colloquially named "The Cactus") | | Forrest Place, Perth | James Angus | 2011 |
| Gumnut Babies | | Stirling Gardens, Perth | Claire Bailey, Indra Geidans | 2001 |
| Bishop Mathew Hale | | The Cloisters, St Georges Terrace, Perth | Greg James | 2008 |
| Talbot Hobbs | | Supreme Court Gardens, Perth | Edward Kohler, Alex Winning | 1940 |
| "Irrational Geometrics" | | Kings Square, Perth | Pascal Dombis & Gil Percal | 2016 |
| "Judith" | | Howard St | Karin Tulloch | 1936. Bronze casting in 2008 |
| "Kangaroos on the Terrace" | | Stirling Gardens St Georges Terrace Perth 3D model | Joan Walsh-Smith, Charles Smith | 1997 |
| "Memory Markers" | | Stirling Gardens, Perth | Anne Neil | 2005 |
| Meteorite (Fire... Water... Earth) | | Forrest Place, Perth | Malcolm McGregor | 2000 |
| Migrants Memorial | | Ozone Reserve, Corner Plain Street and Riverside Drive, Perth | A.J.N Macdonald & Associates | 2008 |
| "Harmony of Minerals Obelisk" aka "The Ore Obelisk" | | Stirling Gardens, Perth | Paul Ritter and Ralph Hibble | 1971 |
| "Oushi zokei" (Mobius in space) | | Elizabeth Quay railway station, Perth | Keizo Ushio | 2010 |
| Paper Planes | | 237 Adelaide Terrace, Perth | | |
| People in the City | | Central Park, Corner Hay and William Streets, Perth | Anne Neil | 1999 |
| John Septimus Roe | | Corner Victoria Avenue and Adelaide Terrace, Perth | Greg James | 1990 |
| "Signature Ring" | | Barrack Square | Simon Gauntlett and Matthew Ngui | |
| "Spanda" | | Elizabeth Quay | Christian de Vietri | 2016 |
| Captain James Stirling | | City of Perth Library 3D model | Clement P Somers | 1979 |
| "The Strike" (Miners) | | Perth Mint, Perth | Greg James | 1991 |
| Bronze Swans | | Swan Bell Tower, Barrack Square, Perth | Sue Flavell, Gina Moore | 2000 |
| "Totem" | | Perth Arena, Perth | Geoffrey Drake-Brockman | 2012 |
| Unidentified Photographer | | Barracks Arch, Corner Barrack Street and Elder Street, Perth | Anne Neil, Greg James | 1996 |
| De Vlamingh Memorial | | Barrack Square, Perth | Joan Walsh-Smith, Charles Smith | 2008 |
| Duxton Hotel lions | | Duxton Hotel, St Georges Terrace, Perth 3D model | | |

== Northbridge/Perth Cultural Centre ==
Public artworks in the Northbridge precinct and around Perth Cultural Centre.

| Name | Image | Location | Artist | Year |
|---|---|---|---|---|
| "Arch" | | Corner of Lake and James Streets, Northbridge | Lorenna Grant | 2010 |
| "Between 1979–1980" | | Art Gallery, Perth Cultural Centre, James Street, Perth | Clement Meadmore | 1981 |
| Der Rufer ('the caller', 'the cryer') | | Art Gallery, Perth Cultural Centre | Gerhard Marcks; Cast by Giesserie Barth, Berlin | 1981 |
| "Gateway 2: Coalesce" | | Perth Cultural Centre, James Street, Perth | Akio Makigawa | 1987 |
| "Luminous" | | Chinatown, Rowe Street, Northbridge | Geoffrey Drake-Brockman | 2015 |
| "Nexus" | | Plateia Hellas, Lake Street, Northbridge | Simon Gauntlett | 2002 |
| "Spiral" | | Perth Police Station, corner of Rowe and Fitzgerald Streets, Northbridge | Geoffrey Drake-Brockman | 2012 |
| "Unfolding Lives" | | Perth Cultural Centre, eastern end of the James Street mall, Northbridge | Judith Forrest | 2010 |

== East Perth and Claisebrook Cove ==
Since the late 1980s, a major urban renewal project surrounding Claisebrook Cove has been underway, with abandoned industrial sites levelled and replaced with residential streetscapes and landscaped waterfronts. These have been interspersed with a good collection of public art.

| Name | Image | Location | Artist | Year |
|---|---|---|---|---|
| "Channel Markers"/"Marker Seats" | | Claisebrook Cove | Malcolm McGregor | 1995 |
| Peace Grove chair | | Claisebook 3D Model | | 1988 |
| "Impossible Triangle" | | East Parade Roundabout, East Perth | Brian MacKay, Ahmad Abas | 1999 |
| Peter Pan | | Queens Gardens, East Perth | George Frampton | 1929 |
| Concrete Poem Sculpture (Spiral Sculpture) | | Claisebrook Cove | Rob Finlayson, PlanE | |
| Edmund Rice | | Centenary Park, Trinity College, East Perth | | |
| Trinity College Mural | | Centenary Park, Trinity College, East Perth | Fintan Magee | 2023 |
| "Sea Queen" | | Claisebrook Cove | Tony Jones | |
| "Shimmer" 6.6m x 4.9m x 8.0m, stainless steel | | Claisebrook Cove | SURF (Jurek Wybraniec/Stephen Neille) | 2012 |
| "Shoreline Marker Posts" | | Claisebrook Cove | Malcolm McGregor | 1995 |
| "Standing Figure" | | Claisebrook Cove | Tony Jones | |
| "The Red Surveyor" | | Corner Saunders and Glyde Streets, Claisebrook Cove | Jon Tarry | |

== Kings Park ==
The following list includes public artworks in Kings Park which is located on the outskirts of the Perth CBD. Kings Park was established as a public park in 1872 and contains a varied collection of public artworks ranging from early 20th century war monuments to life-sized dinosaur models. It is said to contain "more memorials, statues and honour avenues than any other park in Australia".

| Name | Image | Location | Artist | Year |
|---|---|---|---|---|
| Bali Memorial | | Fraser Avenue, Kings Park | David Jones, Kevin Draper | 2003 |
| The South African War Memorial (originally "Fallen Soldiers Memorial"). Titled "in defence of the flag" by the sculptor. | | Fraser Avenue, Kings Park | James White | 1901 |
| Bullockornis | | May Drive Parkland, Kings Park | | |
| Centenary of Western Australian Women's Suffrage Memorial | | Western Australia Botanic Garden, Kings Park | Tony Jones | 1999 |
| Cenotaph, Eternal Flame and War Memorial | | Fraser Avenue, Kings Park | Designed by Sir J. Talbot Hobbs | 1929 |
| Arnold Cook Memorial | | Entrance to the Ivy Watson Playground, Kings Park | Greg James | 1989 |
| Edith Dircksey Cowan Memorial | | Fraser Avenue and Kings Park Road, Kings Park 3D model | W. Ogilvy | 1934 |
| Diprotodon | | May Drive Parkland, Kings Park | Travis Tischler | 2010 |
| Floral Clock | | Fraser Avenue, Kings Park | Bequest from Frank Wittenoom | 1962 |
| "Lord Forrest" | | Fraser Avenue and Lovekin Drive, Kings Park | Sir Edgar Betram MacKennal | 1927 |
| Muttaburrasaurus | | May Drive Parkland, Kings Park | | |
| George Leake Fountain | | Fraser Avenue, Kings Park | | 1902 |
| Phytosaur | | May Drive Parkland, Kings Park | Travis Tischler | 2010 |
| Pioneer Women's Memorial | | Forrest Drive, Kings Park | Margaret Priest | 1968 |
| Queen Victoria | | Fraser Avenue, Kings Park | Francis John Williamson | 1903 |
| Vietnam Memorial | | May Drive Parkland, Kings Park | | 2002 |
| "Wood Be Good" | | Ivy Watson Playground, Kings Park | | |

== South Perth ==
Public artworks within the City of South Perth.

| Name | Image | Location | Artist | Year |
|---|---|---|---|---|
| Aurelian Modulations | | 96 Mill Point Road, South Perth | Jon Tarry | 2018 |
| R/evolve | | South Perth foreshore | Tony Jones, Ben Jones, Angela McHarrie | 2021 |

== Fremantle ==
Public artworks within the City of Fremantle.

| Name | Image | Location | Artist | Year |
|---|---|---|---|---|
| The Explorers' Monument (Maitland Brown Memorial) | | Esplanade Park, Fremantle | Pietro Porcelli | 1913 |
| Child Migrant Statue | | Victoria Quay, Fremantle | Joan Walsh-Smith, Charles Smith | 2006 |
| John Curtin | | Kings Square, Fremantle | Joan Walsh-Smith, Charles Smith | 2005 |
| Sir Hughie Edwards | | Kings Square, Fremantle | Andrew Kay | 2002 |
| The Fishermen | | Fishing Boat Harbour, Fremantle | Greg James, Jon Tarry | 2004 |
| John Gerovich ("Mark of the Century") | | Fremantle Oval, Parry St (at Queen St), Fremantle | Robert Hitchcock | 2006, |
| "Iris Series" | | 20 Ord Street, Fremantle | Greg James | 2009 |
| C. Y. O'Connor | | Fremantle Port Authority entrance, Fremantle | Pietro Porcelli | 1911 |
| Ribbon Sculpture | | Challenger TAFE, Fremantle | | |
| Sculptor Pietro Porcelli | | Kings Square, Fremantle | Greg James | 1993 |
| Bon Scott | | Fremantle Fishing Boat Harbour, Fremantle | Greg James | 2008 |
| Vasco da Gama (Portuguese Memorial) | | Esplanade Park, Fremantle | Ciare Bailey, Edgar Nailor, John Kirkness | 1997 |
| Southern Crossing | | Victoria Quay | Tony Jones and Ben Jones | 2002 |
| Tom Edwards Memorial | | Kings Square, Fremantle | Pietro Porcelli | 1919 |
| The Family | | Newman Court, Fremantle (moved from 99 Plain Street, East Perth in 2019) | Margaret Priest | 1974 |

== Other metropolitan ==
Public artworks in the Perth metropolitan area and outside the Perth CBD and Kings Park.

| Name | Image | Location | Artist | Year |
|---|---|---|---|---|
| Professor H.E. Whitfeld | | University of Western Australia. 3D model | Mr John Dowie | 1941 |
| Wednesday's Child | Wednesdays child | Burswood Park, Burswood 3D model | Abdul-Rahman Abdullah | 2013 |
| Age Shall Not Weary Them | | Cnr Hamersley & Rokeby roads, Subiaco 3D model | Greg James | April 2015 |
| Aboriginal Family | | Minim Cove, Mosman Park | Greg James | 1999 |
| HBF Stadium Artwork | | Stephenson Avenue, Mount Claremont | Midnight Tuesday Artist Team (Dawn Gamblen) | 2016 |
| "Asteroids" | | Broadway (cnr The Avenue), Nedlands | Rick Vermey | 2001 |
| Bibbulmun Yorga woman and her dog | | Neil Hawkins Park, Joondalup | Ron Corbett | |
| Ethereal Hand | The giant hand is a depiction of the indigenous Nyungar creation story "Carers of Everything" | Spearwood Avenue (near Doolette St), Spearwood | Artforms collective | 2016 |
| Banksia Grove Entry Statement | | Banksia Grove | Jon Tarry | 2010 |
| Norman Brearley | | Perth Airport, Redcliffe | Gerard Darwin | |
| Catalpa Memorial | | Esplanade, Rockingham | Joan Walsh-Smith, Charles Smith | 2005 |
| Henry Camfield | | Burswood Park, Burswood | Joan Walsh-Smith, Charles Smith | 1992 |
| Charles Street Artwork | | North Perth | Lorenna Grant | 2016 |
| Centaur Memorial (1874 shipwreck) | | North Beach | Kevin Hayes | 1979 |
| Centrefold | | Marine Parade (at Eileen St), Cottesloe | Mark Grey-Smith | 2006 |
| Dr Arnold Cook and Dreena | | VisAbility (formerly the Association for the Blind), Kitchener Avenue, Victoria Park | Greg James | 2007 |
| "Curl" | | Carter Lane Park, Subiaco | Geoffrey Drake-Brockman | 2015 |
| John Curtin | | Cottesloe Civic Centre, Cottesloe | Peter Gelencsér | 1987 |
| "The Dancer" | | Sir Lawrence Jackson Courtyard, University of Western Australia, Crawley | Greg James | 1979 |
| Mary Durack and child, "the Storyteller" | | Burswood Park, Burswood | Joan Walsh-Smith, Charles Smith | 1995 |
| Annie's Landing Estate Artworks | | Ellenbrook | Lorenna Grant | 2015 |
| "Eliza" | | Matilda Bay | Tony Jones | 2007 |
| "Feathers" | | Marine Parade (at North St), Swanbourne | Anne Neil | 2004 |
| "Fledglings" | | Shenton College, Shenton Park | Greg James | 2000 |
| May Gibbs | | Windsor Park, South Perth | Joan Walsh-Smith, Charles Smith | 2005 |
| "Girl With Two Dolphins" | | Centro Galleria, Morley | Andrew Kay | 1996 |
| Gumnut Fountains (4 locations) | | • Corner Kalamunda and Canning Roads, Kalamunda • Corner Hale and Morrison Roads, Forrestfield • Corner Kalamunda and Newburn Roads, High Wycombe • City of Kalamunda offices entrance statement, 2 Railway Road, Kalamunda | Joan Walsh-Smith, Charles Smith | – – 2008 - |
| Paddy Hannan | | Burswood Park, Burswood | Joan Walsh-Smith, Charles Smith | 1998 |
| "Here Birdy Birdy!" | | Stirling Library, 895 Beaufort St, Inglewood | Clare Bailey | 2004 |
| 3 Children, "Hopscotch" | | Burswood Park | Joan Walsh-Smith, Charles Smith | 1995 |
| "Interlace" | | Central Walk, Joondalup | Geoffrey Drake-Brockman | 2015 |
| "Iris Metropolitan" | | 81 Walcott Street, Mount Lawley | Greg James | 2008 |
| "The Corner" | | Corner of Barlee Street and Beaufort Street, Mount Lawley | Lorenna Grant | 2015 |
| unnamed Islamic artwork | | Riverside Gardens, Bayswater | Arif Satar. Commissioned by Dar Al Shifar (Inc.) | 2005 |
| "Lina" | | City of Stirling Offices, Cedric Street, Stirling | Tony Jones | 2005 |
| Leopard Heads | Represent coat of arms of ancient Roman Emperor Diocletion who founded Split, and the centre piece of the modern Croatian flag | Spearwood Avenue (cnr Beeliar Drive), Yangebup | Artforms collective | 2011 |
| "Lotus" | | Edith Cowan University, Joondalup | Nigel Helyer | 2006 |
| "Marble Bun" | | Edith Cowan University, Joondalup | Rodney Glick | 2004 |
| "Nurture and Growth" | | Scotch College, Swanbourne | Greg James | 1997 |
| C. Y. O'Connor | | C. Y. O'Connor Beach, North Coogee | Tony Jones | 1999 |
| Herb Elliott and Shirley Strickland, "the Olympians" | | Burswood Park, Burswood | Joan Walsh-Smith, Charles Smith | 2001 |
| "Oneness" | | Edith Cowan University, Joondalup | Ron Gomboc | 2003 |
| "Pas de deux" | | Belmont City College, Belmont | Greg James | 2000 |
| "Peace" – Midland Junction Railway Workshops Memorial | | Midland Railway Workshops, Yelverton Drive, Midland | Pietro Porcelli | 1925 |
| Pitman and Walsh Memorial (marble) | | Joondalup Police Academy. Originally installed at The Police Barracks in James Street, Perth. | Constable Douglas Cummings (uncertain), official draftsman of the Police Traffic Department. | 1929 |
| "Readwrite" | | NEXTDC Data Centre, Malaga | Geoffrey Drake-Brockman | 2014 |
| Scarborough Hand | ScarbsHandNight2 | The Esplanade, Scarborough | Kylie Graham | 2017 |
| Scouting monument | | Perry Lakes Reserve | | 1982 |
| "Sky Marker" | | Tarlton Crescent, Perth Airport | Jon Tarry | 2007 |
| "Water Wing" | | Tarlton Crescent, Perth Airport | Jon Tarry | 2007 |
| "Seed Carrier" | | Tarlton Crescent, Perth Airport | Jon Tarry | 2007 |
| Socrates | | University of Western Australia, Crawley 3D model | | |
| Diotima | | University of Western Australia, Crawley 3D model | | |
| "Speakers" | | Victoria Park railway station | | 2010 |
| "Spirit of the Community" | | Belmont Civic Centre, Belmont | Andrew Kay | 1999 |
| Tribanga III | | Station Street, Cottesloe | Clara Hali | 2008 |
| unnamed bronze | | 356 Oxford Street, Leederville | | |
| unnamed bronze | | Western Australia Police Academy, Lakeside Drive, Joondalup | | |
| "Waterlines" | | Terry Tyzack Aquatic Centre, Inglewood | Tony Jones | 2001 |
| Vlamingh Memorial | | Curtin Avenue, Cottesloe | Tony Brand | 1974 |
| Willem de Vlamingh | | Burswood Park, Burswood 3D model | Joan Walsh-Smith, Charles Smith | 1996 |
| Aboriginal tribal leader Yagan | | Heirisson Island, Perth | Robert Hitchcock | 1984 |

== Regional ==
Includes artworks in Western Australian country and regional centres.

| Name | Image | Location | Artist | Year |
|---|---|---|---|---|
| Kondinin ANZAC Horse | WA 10th Light Horse Regiment Memorial was custom designed by our team. The horse is made from corten steel standing 3.5 metres high. | Kondinin, Western Australia | Artforms | 2015 |
| Aboriginal Female Pearl Diver | | Foreshore, Broome | Joan Walsh-Smith, Charles Smith | 2010 |
| Mustafa Kemal Atatürk | | Middleton Beach, Albany | | |
| Antony Gormley Statues, Lake Ballard | | Lake Ballard | Antony Gormley | 2003 |
| Nicholas Baudin | | Albany | Peter Gelencser | 2005 |
| Nicholas Baudin | | Busselton 3D model | Peter Gelencser | 2005 |
| "The Healers" | | Busselton | Lorenna Grant | 2016 |
| David Brand | | Shire of Irwin office foyer, Dongara | | |
| "Fish (the sea in her belly)" | | Busselton Jetty | Nicole Mickle | 2011 |
| Lord Forrest | | 147A Victoria St (cnr Stephens St), Bunbury 3D model | Mark Le Buse | 1979 |
| "Box Jellies" | | Geraldton Lotteries House – Sanford St, Geraldton | Peter Zappa | 2010 |
| "Brother and Sister" | | Roundabout on Victoria Street, Bunbury | Russell Sheridan | |
| Camel Train (Tin Camels) | | Prinsep Street Roundabout, Norseman | | |
| "Circus Train – Slow Down" | | Leschenault Inlet Foreshore, Bunbury | Alex Mickle, Nicole Mickle | 2010 |
| Desert Mounted Corps Memorial | | Mount Clarence, Albany | Charles Gilbert, Paul Montford, Sir Bertram Mackennal | 1968 |
| "Red Dog" (The Pilbara Wanderer) | | High Street, Dampier | | |
| Paddy Hannan | | Hannan St, Kalgoorlie | John MacLeod | 1929 |
| Hard Hat Pearl Diver | | Carnarvon Street, Broome | Joan Walsh-Smith, Charles Smith | 1999 |
| Miners Monument | | Corner Burt and Lane Streets, Boulder | Clement. P. Somers | 1984 |
| Mokare | | Albany | Terry Humble | 1997 |
| "The Navigators" ("Gateway"/"Four Winds Monument") | | Australind Bypass Roundabout Bunbury | Jon Tarry | 2000 |
| "Norseman" (Prospectors horse) | | Corner Roberts and Ramsay Streets, Norseman | Robert Hitchcock | |
| Onslow War Memorial | | Onslow | Joan Walsh-Smith, Charles Smith | 2006 |
| "Patrick" (pelican) | | Mandurah Terrace, Mandurah | Claire Bailey | |
| Frederick Henry Piesse | | Austral Terrace, Katanning | Pietro Porcelli | 1916 |
| Brigadier A.W. Potts | | Kojonup | Greg James | 2007 |
| "Shirely Shell" | | Mandurah railway station, Mandurah; 32.527148°S 115.746621°E | Coral Lowry | 2007 |
| HMAS Sydney Memorial | | Mount Scott Park, Corner George Road and Brede Street, Geraldton | Joan Walsh-Smith, Charles Smith | 2001 |
| Taking Tea (sculpture) | | Absolon Street, Dumbleyung | Philip Shelton | 2013 |
| "Water Dance" | | Forrest Highway, Lake Clifton; 32°37.860′S 115°48.884′E | Anne Neil | 2009 |
| Unnamed sculpture | | Indian Ocean Drive near Cervantes | | 2010 |
| "Whale Tail" | | Waterfront, Esperance | Cindy Poole and Jason Wooldridge | 2014 |
| "Into the Blue" | | Foreshore Esplanade, Rockingham | Braham Stevens | 2019 |
