= Crawley, Western Australia =

Crawley
- Suburb
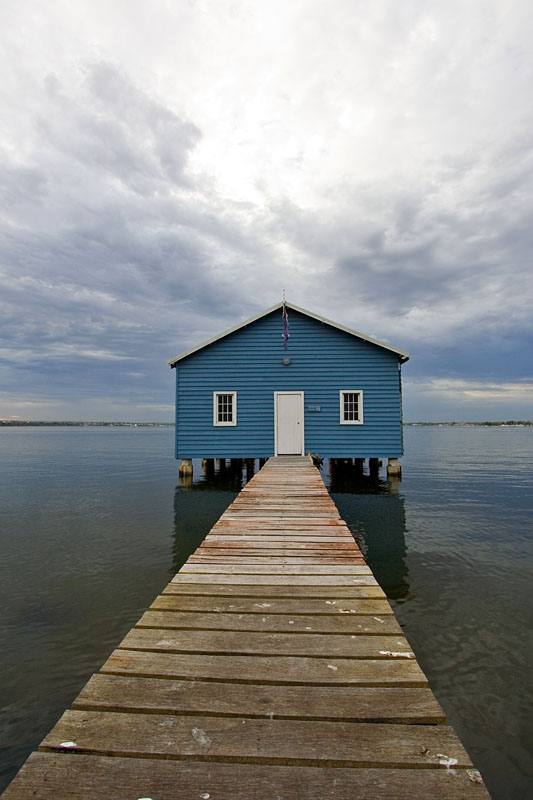
- Crawley Edge Boatshed
- Interactive map of Crawley
- Coordinates: 31.986°S 115.822°E
- Country: Australia
- State: Western Australia
- City: Perth
- LGA: City of Perth
- Location: 5.8 km (3.6 mi) SW of the Perth CBD

Government
  - State electorate: Nedlands
  - Federal division: Curtin

Area
  - Total: 1.4 km^{2} (0.54 sq mi)

Population
  - Total: 3,975 (SAL 2021)
- Postcode: 6009
Suburbs around Crawley
| Nedlands | Kings Park | Perth |
| Nedlands | Crawley | Matilda Bay |
| Nedlands | Swan River |

Crawley is a western suburb of Perth, the capital city of Western Australia. The area is part of the local government area of the City of Perth and was previously shared between the City of Subiaco and City of Perth. It is about 5.8 kilometres (4 mi) from the Perth CBD via Mounts Bay Road.

The earlier name of the locality was Crawley Park. It was named by an early landowner, Henry Charles Sutherland, whose mother's maiden name was Crawley.

It is home to the University of Western Australia, the state's oldest university.

== Riverside features ==
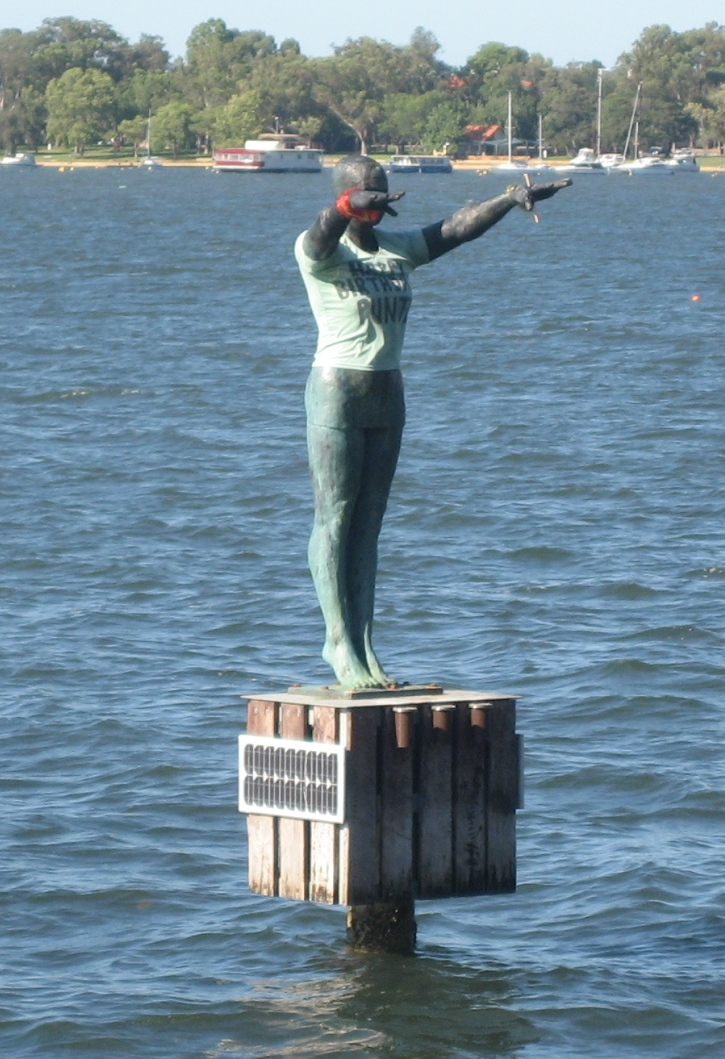
Statue Eliza

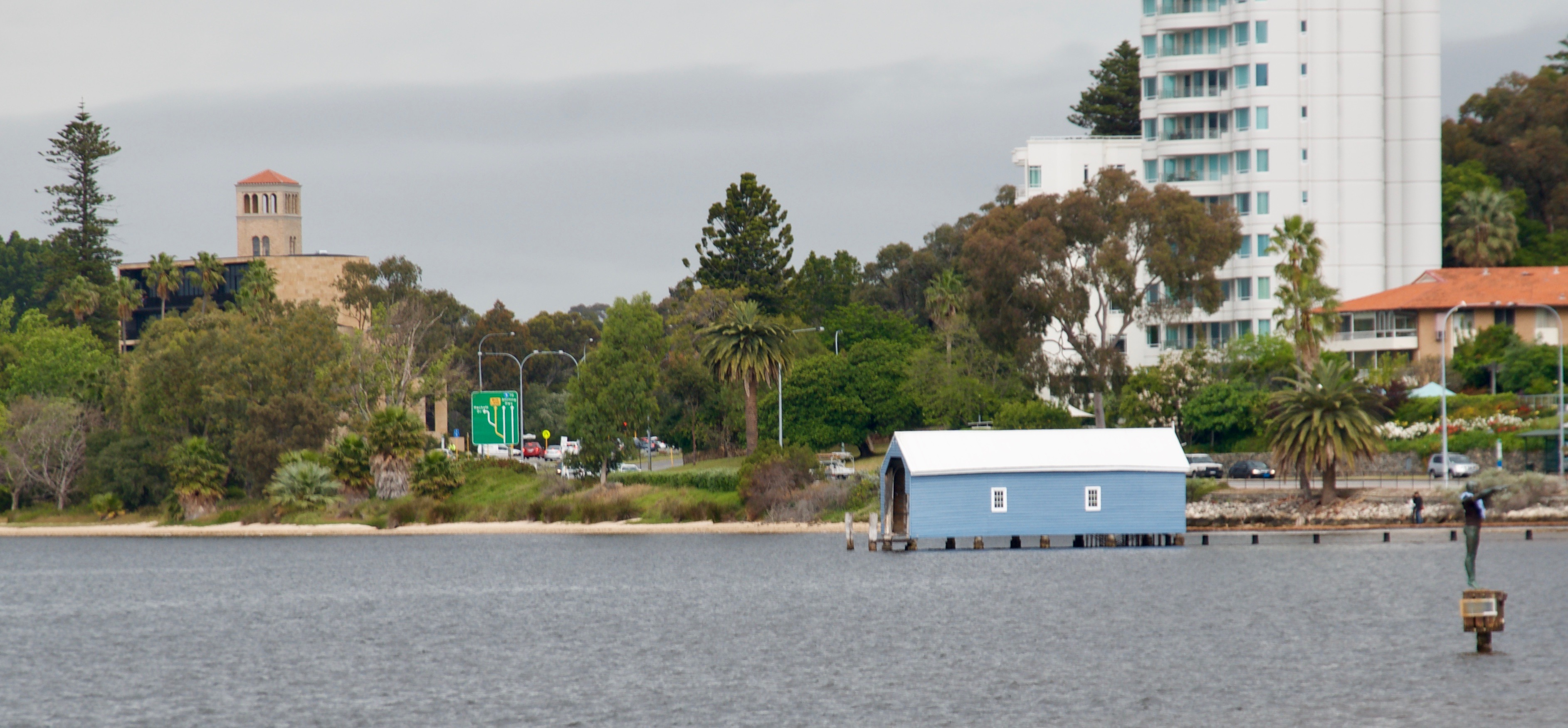
Statue, shed and University tower from the east

The Crawley Edge Boatshed is a well-recognised and frequently photographed site in Crawley. It is thought to have been originally constructed in the early 1930s. It has changed hands several times, and after being refurbished in the early 2000s, it was relaunched by triple solo-circumnavigator of the world, Jon Sanders, and single solo-circumnavigator David Dicks.

A statue called Eliza is also in Matilda Bay in the Swan River, in Crawley. Created by Tony and Ben Jones, the statue was unveiled on 15 October 2007 to commemorate Crawley Baths, Perth's prime competition and recreational swimming venue from 1914 to 1964. Eliza is often dressed up in clothing to represent special occasions.

The Royal Perth Yacht Club was reestablished on the shore of Pelican Point in Crawley after moving from Perth in 1953.

== World War flying boat base ==
The Swan River at Crawley was utilised before the war as a flying boat landing location.

During World War II, the bay in the Swan River at Crawley was the location of a flying boat base, for Patrol Wing 10, which had to leave Surabaya in Java. The base was also known as Pelican Point due to the feature in the river being the defining and identifiable location from the air, at the end of the bay.

After the war the base was decommissioned, following opposition to a plan to redevelop and expand it.

It was also the start point for The Double Sunrise squadron, which was formed in 1943 to keep the air route between Australia and the United Kingdom open.

== Population ==
In the 2016 census, there were 4,095 people in Crawley. 35.6% of people were born in Australia. The next most common countries of birth were China 15.8%, Singapore 7.1%, Malaysia 5.1%, England 3.5% and Indonesia 3.1%. 47.9% of people spoke only English at home. Other languages spoken at home included Mandarin 19.3%, Cantonese 3.6% and Indonesian 2.9%. The most common responses for religion were No Religion 42.0% and Catholic 11.9%. The median age is 24, much younger than WA's median as well as national, which are 36 and 38 respectively.

These UWA residential colleges are in Crawley: St Catherine's College, St George's College, St Thomas More College, Trinity Residential College, and University Hall.
