= Crawley Edge Boatshed =

Boatshed in Matilda Bay, on Mounts Bay Road, Crawley, Western Australia

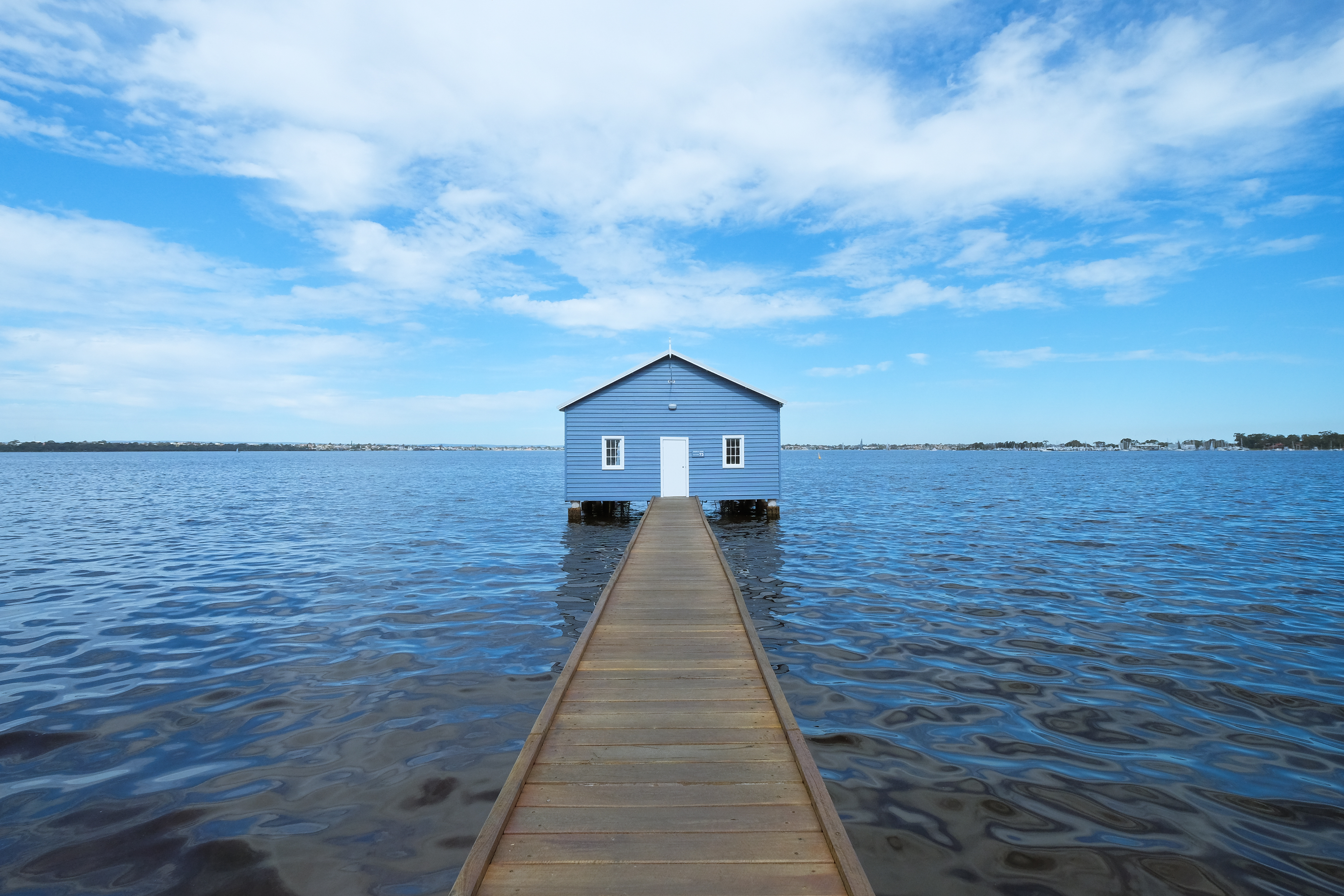
- The Boatshed in 2016

General information
- Status: Constructed
- Location: Crawley, Perth, Australia
- Coordinates: 31°58′24.7″S 115°49′35.6″E
- Construction started: 1930s
- Owner: Nattrass family

The Crawley Edge Boatshed, commonly referred to as the Blue Boat House, is a boathouse located on the Swan River at Matilda Bay, Crawley, in Perth, Western Australia. A well-known landmark, it has been owned since the 1940s mainly by the Nattrass family.

== History ==
The initial version of the boatshed was built in the 1930s. It first came into the hands of the Nattrass family when Roland and Joyce Nattrass purchased the land behind it in 1944 as the site for their family home.

The real estate agent insisted the boatshed be purchased with the land for an additional £5, equivalent to A$405 in 2022.

In 1972, Roland Nattrass gave the boatshed to Ron Armstrong, a patron of the Perth Sea Scouts. A slightly larger boatshed was built around the original. In the 1990s, ownership of the boatshed passed to Barry Kollman, a sailor from the Royal Perth Yacht Club.

In 2001, the boatshed was put up for sale and purchased by Peter Nattrass, son of Roland Nattrass and Lord Mayor of Perth at the time.

The boatshed had become very run down by then. Faced with government threats to demolish and remove it, the family began to rebuild it. At the suggestion of a family friend, the local federal member of parliament Julie Bishop, the boatshed was repainted in a bold blue colour.

On 6 February 2004, the refurbished boatshed was re-launched by Perth yachtsman Jon Sanders and Perth sailor David Dicks. In late 2015, it was given a facelift, which included repainting the exterior and replacing the wooden jetty with a new one with steel pylons.

== Tourism ==
A short video of the Boatshed

In the 21st century, the boatshed has become an Australian icon, and star attraction for tourists visiting Perth from Asia. It is included in the itineraries of various city tour operators, and is also accessible from the Perth CBD by Transperth bus along Mounts Bay Road.

As of June 2019, the hashtag "#blueboathouse" had thousands of Instagram posts to its name. A CNN article published that month claimed that the boatshed was the most photographed travel attraction in Perth, ahead of Elizabeth Quay, Cathedral Square and the Bell Tower in Barrack Square. Another article published that month, on the website The Conversation, claimed that the boatshed had become Perth's second-most popular spot for tourist selfies, and that social media publicity about the boatshed had generated global awareness about Perth potentially worth millions of dollars.

According to Tom Nattrass, images of the boatshed have been used in marketing material for Singapore Airlines, Qantas and in Japanese advertisements. In March 2019, a group of tourists queuing up to take selfies at the boatshed included a woman from Singapore who told The West Australian, "Everyone from Singapore that visits Perth gets a photo here, it's all over social media." One visitor from Thailand told ABC News in June 2019 that young couples from her country would travel to the boathouse to participate in pre-wedding photoshoots. Another visitor, from Malaysia, said that she had travelled to Perth specifically to take a photo with it.

At a meeting of the City of Perth held on 28 May 2019, the commissioners of the city resolved, due to the increase in visitors to the boatshed, the nearby Eliza statue and the Old Swan Brewery, to spend $400,000 on a new stand-alone solar-powered toilet. Construction of the toilet, at Quarry Point, between the boatshed and the brewery, was due to be completed by August 2019, and the toilet is now in use.

In mid-July 2019, the boatshed was temporarily wrapped in red plastic sheeting, as a tribute to the Manchester United football team, which was visiting Perth to play two friendly matches. On 14 July 2019, three of the team's players, Tahith Chong, Axel Tuanzebe and Joel Pereira, visited and were photographed at the wrapped boatshed.

As of late 2020, Kmart Australia stores around the country, and also discount furniture stores in North America, were selling framed canvas images of the boathouse, labelled Coastal House [sic], with the surrounds and usually blue sky washed out.

In September 2024, Kerstin Casparij, Jess Park, and Australia's Mary Fowler, three members of the Manchester City W.F.C. team that had just been narrowly defeated in a match in Perth against Paris Saint-Germain FC, visited the boatshed and posed for photographs.
