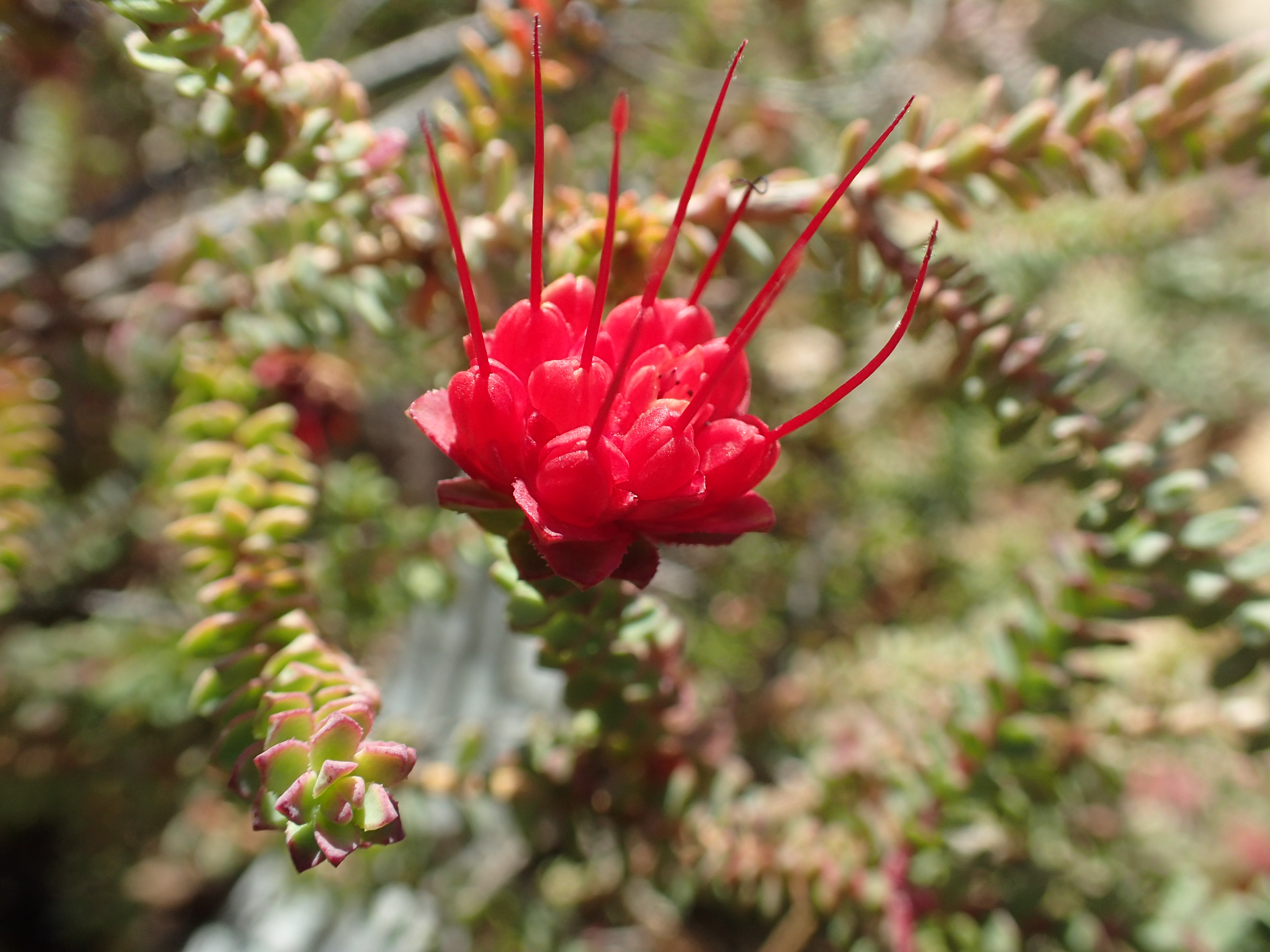
- Darwinia oldfieldii in Kings Park, Perth

Scientific classification
- Kingdom: Plantae
- Clade: Tracheophytes
- Clade: Angiosperms
- Clade: Eudicots
- Clade: Rosids
- Order: Myrtales
- Family: Myrtaceae
- Genus: Darwinia
- Species: D. oldfieldii

Binomial name
- Darwinia oldfieldii Benth.
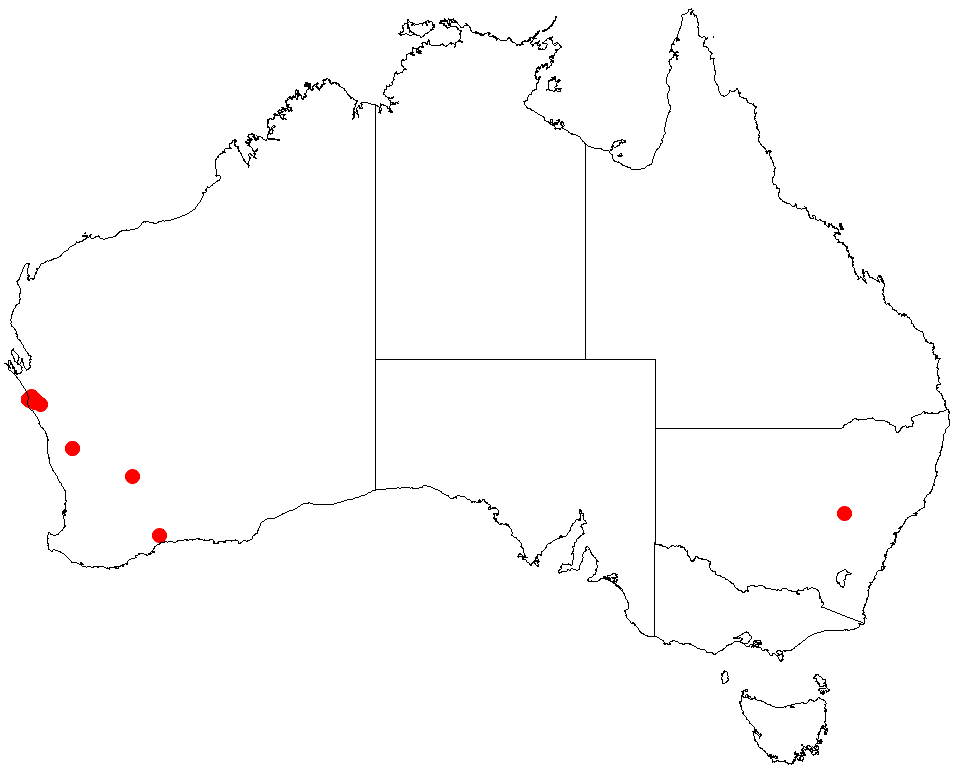
- Occurrence data from AVH

= Darwinia oldfieldii =

Oldfield's darwinia

Species of flowering plant

Darwinia oldfieldii is a species of flowering plant in the family Myrtaceae and is endemic to Western Australia. It is an erect, spreading shrub with oblong leaves and dense heads of erect, red flowers.

== Description ==
Darwinia oldfieldii is an erect, spreading shrub that typically grows to a height of 15–50 cm (5.9–19.7 in). Its leaves are oblong with a blunt tip, usually less than 4.2 mm (0.17 in) long, with the edges curved down. The flowers are red and arranged in dense, hemispherical clusters of 10 to 12 or more, surrounded by overlapping, scaly bracts that are shorter than the flowers. The sepals are about 6.5 mm (0.26 in) long with small, scale-like lobes and the petals are egg-shaped and nearly 3.2 mm (0.13 in) long. Flowering occurs from August to November.

== Taxonomy ==
First formally described in 1865 by George Bentham, the description was published in the Journal of the Linnean Society, Botany in 1867 from a specimen collected by Augustus Oldfield near the Murchison River. The specific epithet (oldfieldii) honours the collector of the type specimens.

== Distribution and habitat ==
Darwinia oldfieldii grows in sandy soil on sandplains and on rocky ocean ledges in the Geraldton Sandplains bioregion of western Western Australia, including in Kalbarri National Park.

== Conservation status ==
This darwinia is listed as "not threatened" by the Western Australian Government Department of Biodiversity, Conservation and Attractions.
