= Matilda Bay =

Bay in the Swan River, Western Australia

Coordinates: 31°58′50″S 115°49′26″E

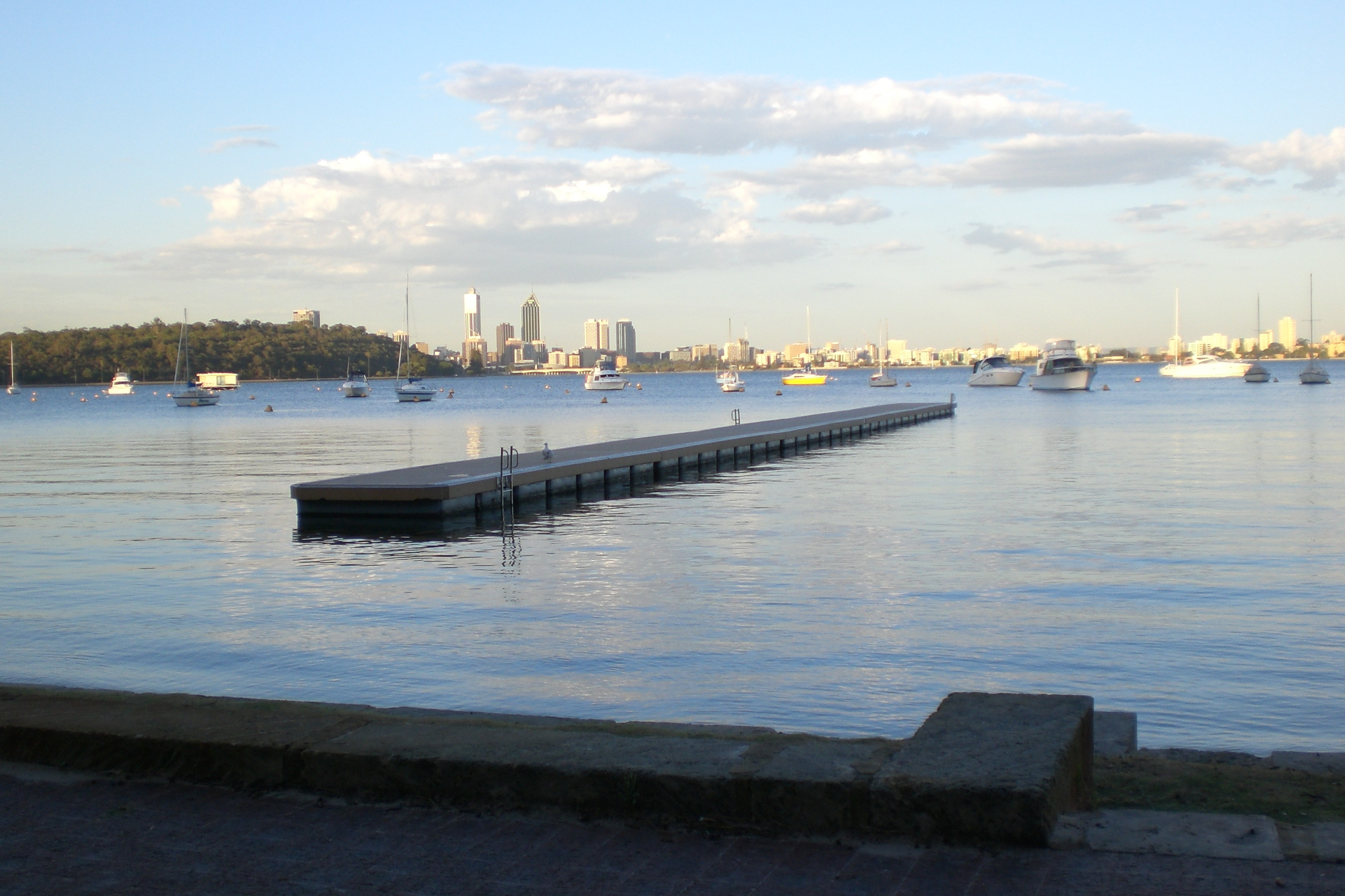
Matilda bay towards the city

Matilda Bay or Crawley Bay (known originally as Currie's Bay, then Sutherland's Bay) is a natural bay in the Swan River in Western Australia, adjacent to the Perth suburb of Crawley. It extends from Pelican Point to Mounts Bay Road below Kings Park.

The University of Western Australia is immediately opposite. Other landmarks on the bay include Crawley Edge Boatshed, the UWA Boat Club, Matilda Bay Restaurant, Royal Perth Yacht Club, Mounts Bay Sailing Club, and Pelican Point Sea Scouts.

A well-known bronze sculpture that is located at the site of the former Crawley Baths – Eliza by Tony Jones and Ben Jones is displayed just offshore from Mounts Bay Road and depicts a woman preparing to dive.

Matilda Bay Reserve is a recreational parkland between Hackett Drive and the river. It includes Pelican Point, which is an important breeding sanctuary for migratory birds.

Matilda Bay is believed to have been named after the wife of John Septimus Roe, Matilda (née Bennett).

== History ==
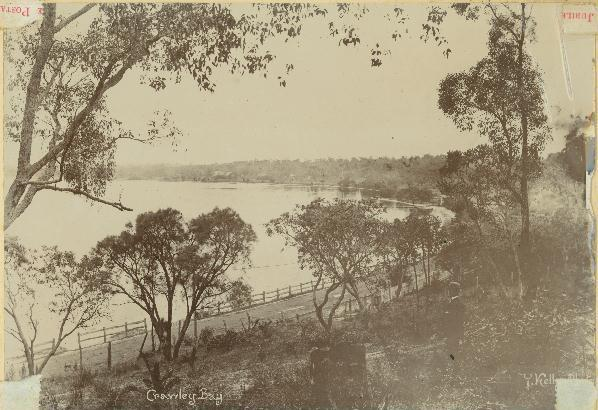
Crawley Bay in the 1890s

Captain Currie was the first colonial owner of the 13-hectare (32-acre) estate surrounding the bay, at that time known as Currie's Bay. Pelican Point was then known as Point Currie. The estate was sold in 1832 to the Assistant Surveyor and Colonial Treasurer, Henry Charles Sutherland for £100. Sutherland named the property Crawley Park after his mother's maiden name and the bay became known as Sutherland's Bay. In 1876 Crawley Park was sold to Sir George Shenton, and the bay was known generally as Crawley Bay. After Shenton's death in 1909, the estate was acquired by the Government in 1910 and vested in the University of Western Australia in 1912.

Some of the present foreshore, west of Crawley Baths, was created by land reclamation to allow Mounts Bay Road to be widened.

The US Navy had a fleet of 60 Catalina flying boats based at Matilda Bay during World War II, part of Naval Base Perth.

In 1943, Qantas operated five Catalina flying boats between Ceylon (now Sri Lanka) and Matilda Bay in what was known as the Double Sunrise service.

== Image gallery ==
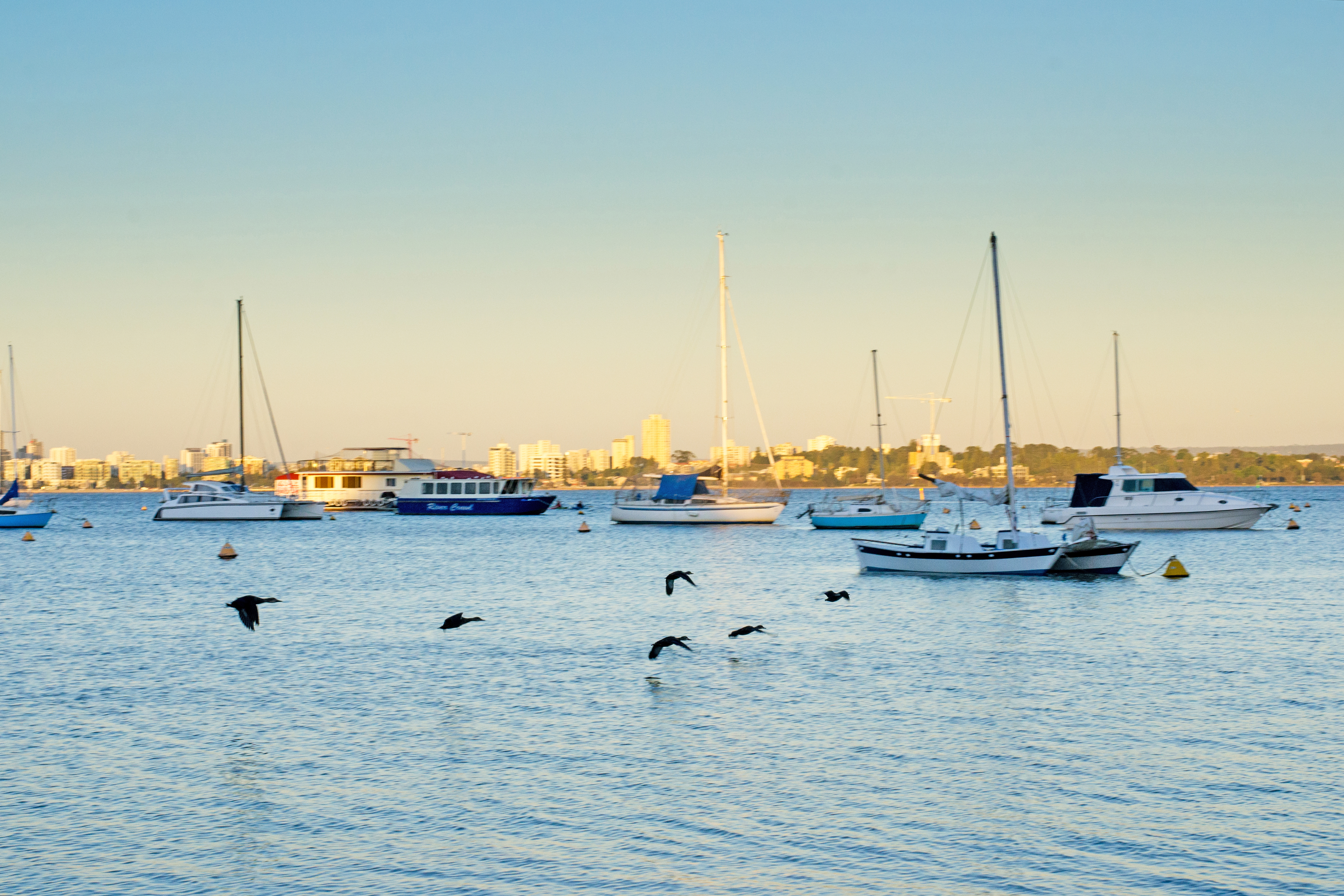
Ducks fly over the water at Matilda Bay during sunset

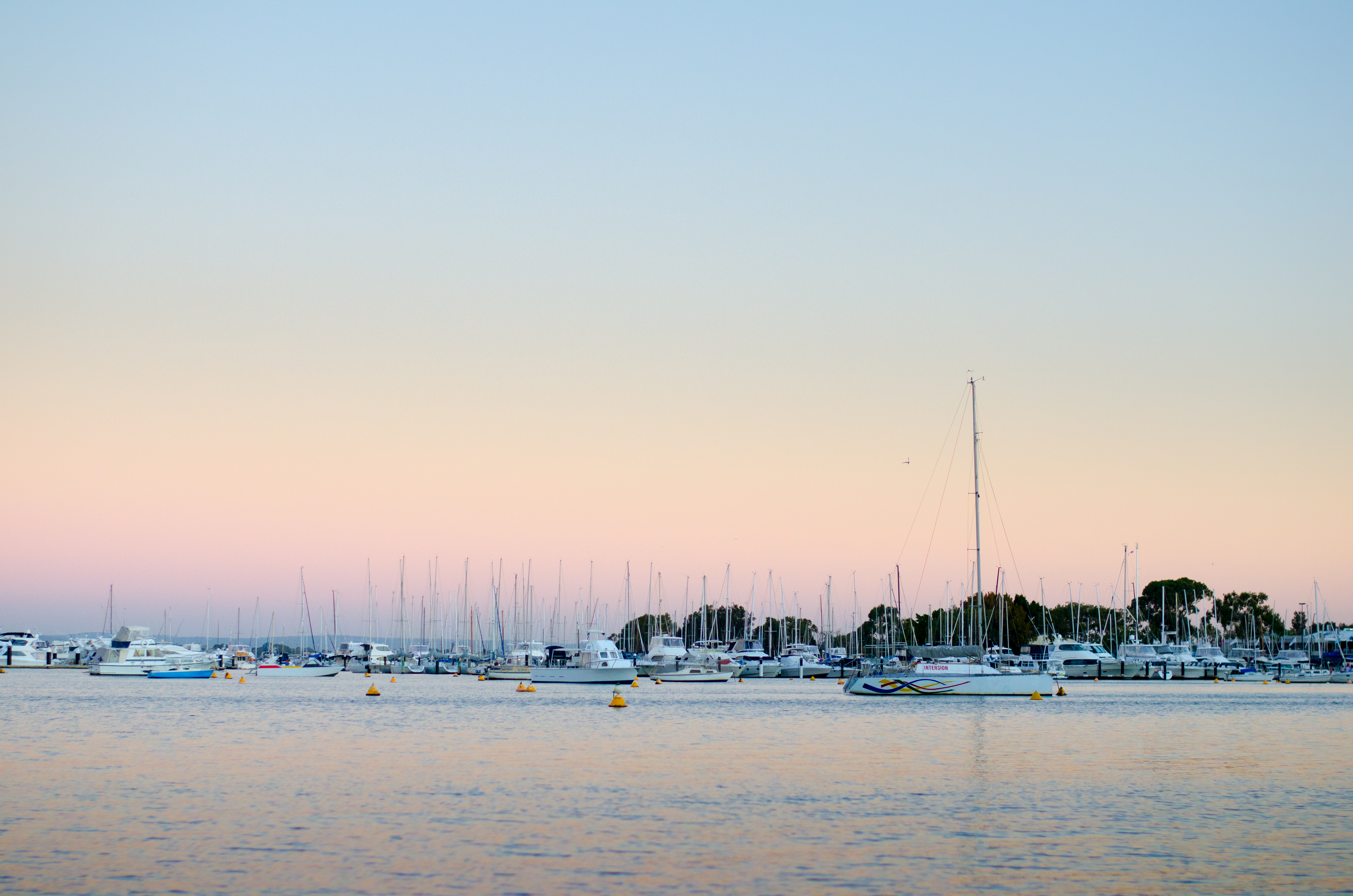
Sunset at Matilda Bay

== See also ==
- Matilda Bay Brewing Company
