= Pelican Point (Swan River) =

Point into Swan River, Western Australia

Coordinates: 31.9870°S 115.8277°E

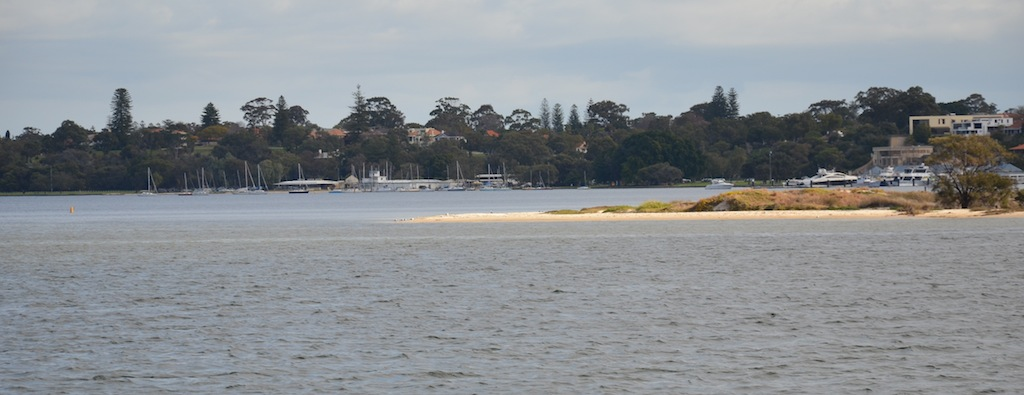
Point Currie aka Pelican Point from the north east

Pelican Point is a geographical feature and nature reserve on the Swan River in Perth, located at Matilda Bay near the University of Western Australia. The point is named for the pelicans that rest on sand bars at the end of the point.

Pelican Point was formerly named Point Currie after Captain Currie, who in 1829 received an allotment of land in the area and which became known as Crawley.

The area south of the point's axis is now a bird sanctuary.

The northern side includes the Royal Perth Yacht Club, Mounts Bay Sailing Club, the 1st Pelican Point Sea Scouts and a public boat ramp. A road named Australia II Drive runs off Hackett Drive.

During World War II the area hosted a United States naval base which used the name Pelican Point, at which Catalina Flying Boats were based.

== See also ==
- Crawley for more regarding the Flying Boat Base
- The Double Sunrise
