= Crawley Baths =

Former swimming facility in Perth, Western Australia

Coordinates: 31°58′21″S 115°49′48″E

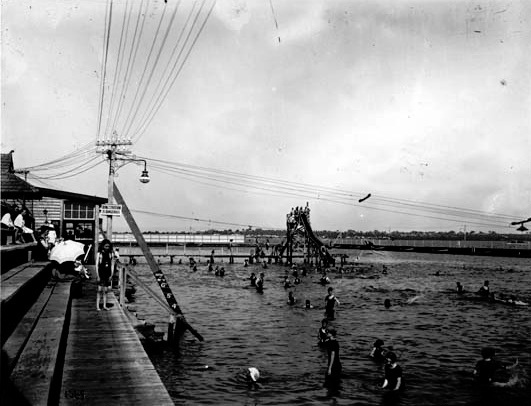
Crawley Baths c. 1920–1929

Crawley Baths was a public swimming facility, in Matilda Bay, near Crawley, Western Australia along Mounts Bay Road. The timber structure was opened on 7 February 1914. The opening ceremony was conducted by Premier John Scaddan and included a swimming carnival and life saving displays.

The baths were the largest enclosed body of water in the southern hemisphere and were an important recreational facility in Perth for fifty years. They were demolished in 1964 after Beatty Park was built for the 1962 Commonwealth Games.

A bronze statue Eliza, by Tony Jones and Ben Jones, commemorates the baths and stands in the river near its former location.

== See also ==
- Perth City Baths
