= Centenary of Western Australian Women's Suffrage Memorial =

Memorial in Kings Park, Perth, Western Australia

- Artist: Tony Jones
- Year: 1999
- Type: Bronze
- Location: Perth, Western Australia; 31°57′51″S 115°50′21″E

The Centenary of Western Australia Women's Suffrage Memorial is located in the Western Australia Botanic Garden, within Kings Park in Perth, Western Australia. It commemorates the hundredth anniversary of women achieving the right to vote equally with men in Western Australian elections.

The memorial was commissioned during plans for commemorating the centenary of women's suffrage in Western Australia, and was designed by artist Tony Jones. It was constructed by students from the Western Australia School of Art and Design and installed in 1999.

The memorial artwork, known as the Bookleaf Memorial, is of an open book with pages that have apparently been blown away by the wind. The pages of the book rest on the ground in the shape of leaves.

== See also ==
- List of monuments and memorials to women's suffrage
