= Eliza (sculpture) =

Sculpture located in the Swan River, Western Australia

Coordinates: 31°58′22″S 115°49′45.14″E

Eliza wearing a T-shirt

Eliza is a bronze sculpture located in Matilda Bay on the Swan River in Western Australia. The sculpture and plinth are mounted on a steel pylon 15 metres (49 ft) off the shoreline and depicts a woman about to dive off a wooden platform. It commemorates the old Crawley Baths which were a prominent Perth landmark during the early to mid 20th century. The sculpture is 2.2 metres (7 ft 3 in) high, and has its own lighting from solar panels.

The public artwork was done by Perth artists Tony Jones and Ben Jones on a commission from the City of Perth and had an estimated cost of A$167,000, equivalent to A$247,400 in 2022.

Eliza was unveiled by Peter Nattrass, Perth Lord Mayor on 15 October 2007 and has since been regularly "dressed" in various costumes by students (Note: The main University of Western Australia campus is about 800 metres or 2,600 feet to its west.) and other unknown pranksters. (Note: Pranks have been a part of past Prosh events.) Costumes have included a Santa Claus outfit (including beard) and a Melbourne Cup frock and champagne flute.

The sculpture is named after Mount Eliza; Mount Eliza was named by James Stirling in honour of Eliza Darling, the wife of Ralph Darling, an early Governor of New South Wales.

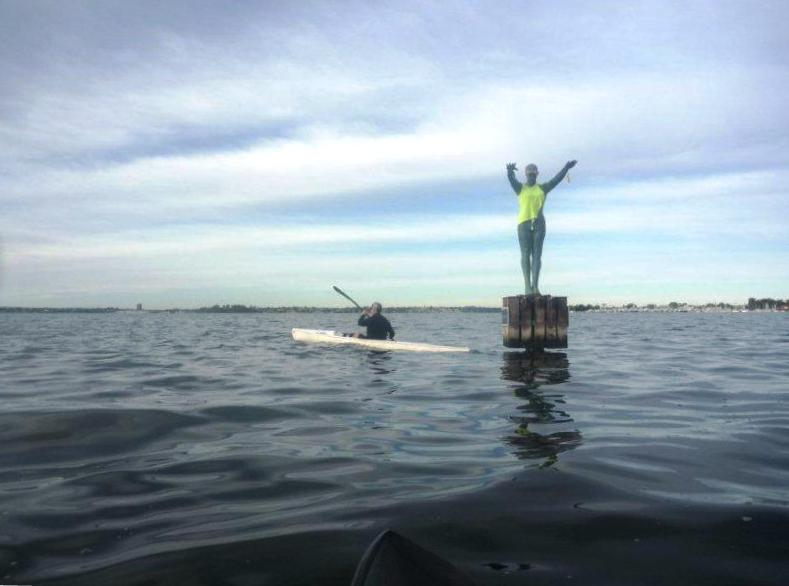

== See also ==
- List of public art in Western Australia
