= Tony Jones (Australian sculptor) =

Australian artist (born 1944)

Tony Jones OAM
- Born: 1944 (age 81–82); Adelaide, South Australia
- Education: Western Australian Institute of Technology
- Known for: Sculpture
- Notable work: Eliza, C. Y. O'Connor, Centenary of Western Australian Women's Suffrage Memorial
- Spouse: Pam Jones (m. 1968)
- Children: 2
- Awards: Medal of the Order of Australia (OAM) (2009), Arts, Culture and Entertainment Award at the Western Australia Citizen of the Year Award (2008)

Antony David Jeffrey Jones (born 1944) is an Australian sculptor, best known for public artworks representing Western Australian history such as Eliza and his statue of the engineer C. Y. O'Connor.

== Early life and education ==
Jones was born in the South Australian capital of Adelaide in 1944, the first of three children of Geoff and Patricia (née Englehardt). His paternal grandfather, who worked as an accountant, was also a gifted artist. His family moved to Western Australia shortly after the end of World War II, with Jeff becoming a gold assayer in Kalgoorlie before moving to the state capital of Perth where he founded the first business to sell Venetian blinds in Western Australia. In 1954 Jeff built a house in the Perth suburb of Mosman Park overlooking Chidley Point and the Swan River, where the family settled. Jones's upbringing on the river greatly influenced his later artwork. He attended Christ Church Grammar School, graduating in 1962, where he "only just passed" the art course, before attending Graylands Teachers College, where he graduated with a teacher's certificate in 1963 and won that year's College Art Prize. After graduation, he spent five years in a high-school art-teaching job in the town of Collie, where he had access to a studio and also taught art classes to adults. His art was exhibited for the first time in a group exhibition at the 1969 Perth Festival. Having returned to Perth, from 1970 to 1975 Jones continued high-school teaching while studying art part-time at the Western Australian Institute of Technology (WAIT), now Curtin University, graduating with an Associateship in Art Teaching. At WAIT he switched his focus from painting to sculpture.

== Artistic career ==
After graduating from WAIT, he took up a dual career as an artist and art teacher. He taught sculpture in vocational education courses, first at the Claremont School of Art, then at the Central Institute of Technology, retiring as a teacher in 2015. His most famous works of public sculpture are Eliza (2007), created to commemorate the Crawley Baths public swimming facility, which is commonly dressed in various outfits, and his statue of the engineer C. Y. O'Connor riding his horse in the ocean in North Coogee (1999). He also designed the Centenary of Western Australian Women's Suffrage Memorial (1999). He works in a studio in O'Connor near Fremantle. He has described his process as follows:

My artistic vision encompasses and combines cultural and political issues, local history, maritime and aeronautical imagery as well as themes from the personal and the imagined. My sculpture has been based on an expression of personal and public concerns, anxieties, hopes and aspirations, drawing on common symbols and myths as a way of making contemporary connections. It has been a search for forms and narratives, gestures and contexts, that transcend any one incident or time. This is often done without resort to the language of abstraction. To establish symbolic order is difficult and the forms and language used are always part of a larger search.

== Personal life ==
Jones has been married to Pam (née Mathieu), a teacher and jeweller, since 1968 and they have lived in East Fremantle since 1980. The couple have two children, Gemma (born 1972) and Ben (born 1975), both artists. Ben has assisted Jones with making sculptures. An avid boater, Jones collects historic dinghies and founded the Swan River Sailing Dinghy Heritage Association to restore and find a permanent place for them. The collection contains two 12 m2 Sharpies used by Australian Olympic sailor Rolly Tasker immediately before and during the 1956 Melbourne Olympics.

== Recognition ==
In 2008, Jones received an Arts, Culture and Entertainment Award at the Western Australia Citizen of the Year Awards. In the 2009 Queen's Birthday Honours, he received a Medal of the Order of Australia "for service to the visual arts as a sculptor and educator."

== Selected works ==
Eliza sculpture in Matilda Bay

- C. Y. O'Connor, North Coogee, 1999
- Centenary of Western Australian Women's Suffrage Memorial, Kings Park, 1999
- Eliza (with Ben Jones), 2007, Matilda Bay
- Lina, Stirling, 2005
- R/evolve (with Ben Jones and Angela McHarrie), South Perth foreshore, 2021
- Sea Queen, Claisebrook Cove
- Sir Charles Court, Perth CBD, 2011
- Southern Crossing (with Ben Jones), 2002, Fremantle
- Standing Figure, Claisebrook Cove
- Waterlines, Inglewood, 2001
