= Kings Park, Western Australia =

Park in Perth, Western Australia

Kings Park
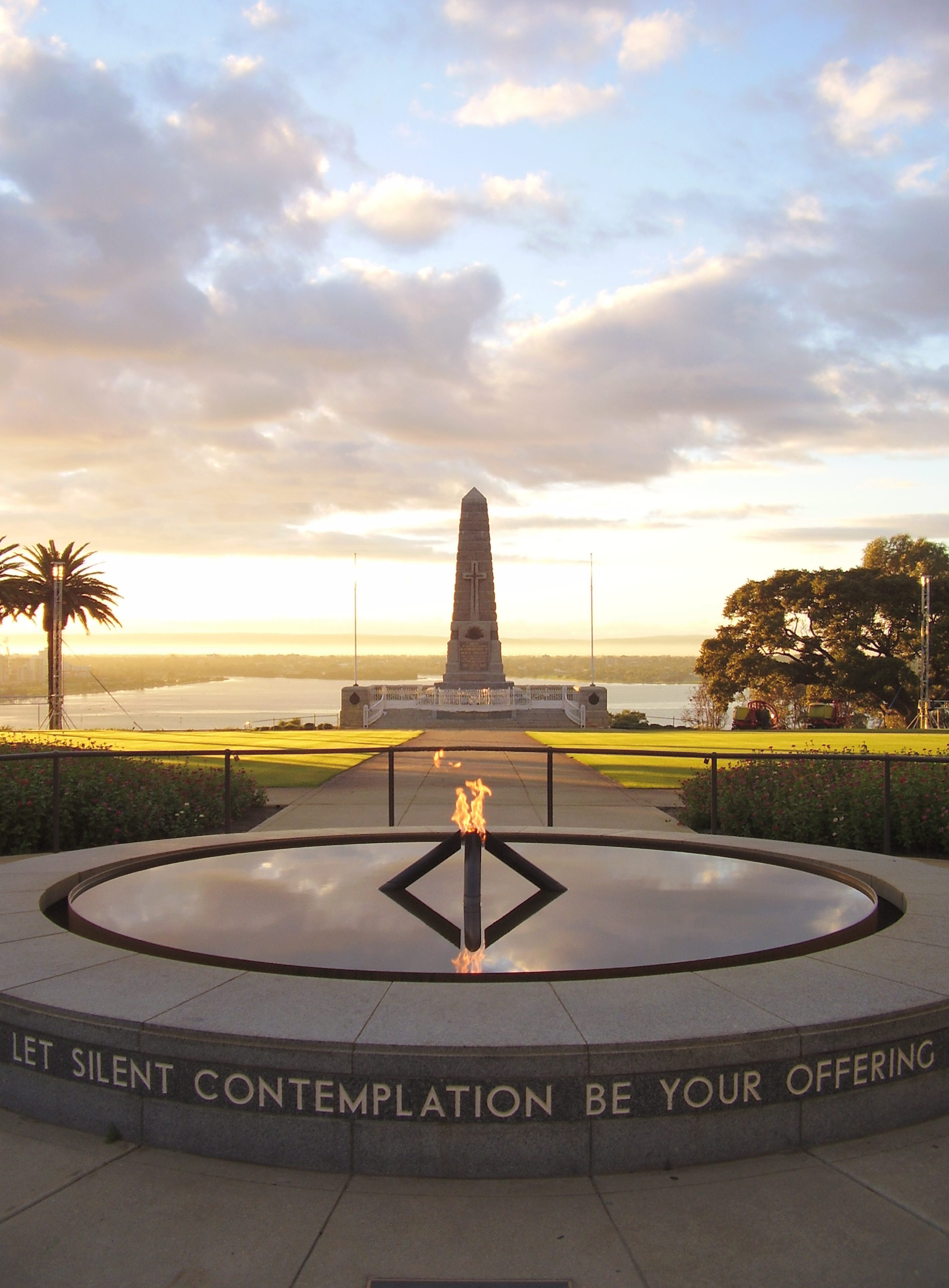
- Eternal flame, with State War Memorial (behind)
- Interactive map of Kings Park
- Location: Perth, Western Australia
- Coordinates: 31°57′44″S 115°49′54″E
- Area: 400.6 ha (990 acres)
- Designated: 1831; 195 years ago
- Founder: James Stirling and John Septimus Roe
- Owner: Crown (public)
- Administrator: Botanic Gardens and Parks Authority
- Visitors: 5.8 million (in 2012)
- Open: Always
- Status: Open
- Designation: A-Class Reserve
- Website: www.bgpa.wa.gov.au/kings-park

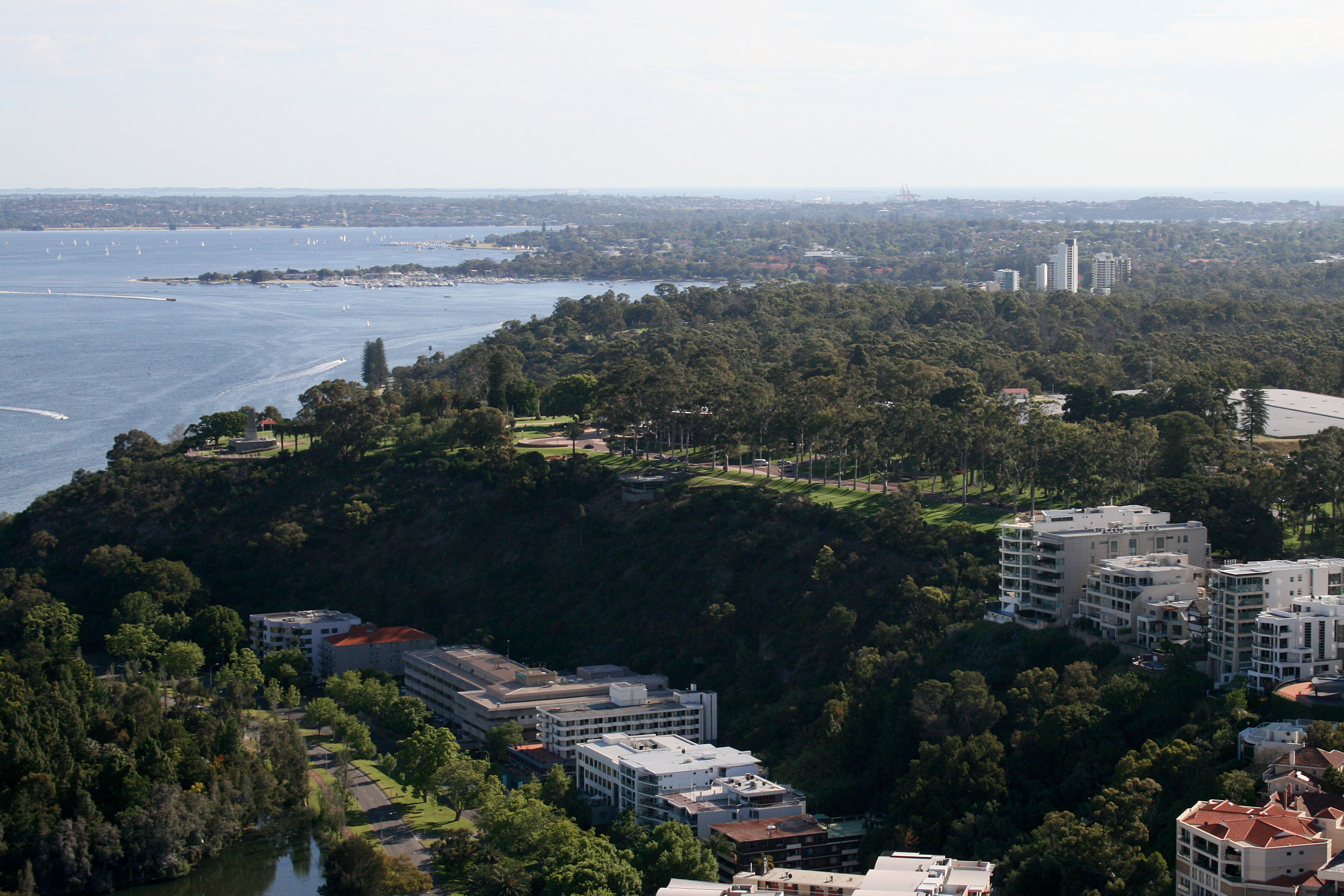
Kings Park viewed from QV1

Kings Park is a 400.6-hectare (990-acre) park overlooking Perth Water and the Perth central business district, Western Australia.

The park is a mixture of grassed parkland, botanical gardens and natural bushland on Mount Eliza with two-thirds of the grounds conserved as native bushland. Offering panoramic views of the Swan River and Darling Range, it is home to over 324 native plant varieties, 215 known indigenous fungi species and 80 bird species.

It is the most popular visitor destination in Western Australia, being visited by over five million people each year.

Besides tourist facilities, Kings Park contains the State War Memorial, the Royal King's Park Tennis Club, and the Mount Eliza Reservoir. The streets are tree-lined with individual plaques dedicated by family members to Western Australian service men and women who died in World War I and World War II. The park is also rich in flora (both native and introduced) and during September of each year Kings Park hosts Australia's largest wildflower show and exhibition – the Kings Park Festival.

Since 1 July 2016, the park has been within the City of Perth local government district; however, under the City of Perth Act 2016 City local laws do not apply to or in respect of King's Park, which remains a Class A reserve administered under the Botanic Gardens and Parks Authority framework.

== History ==
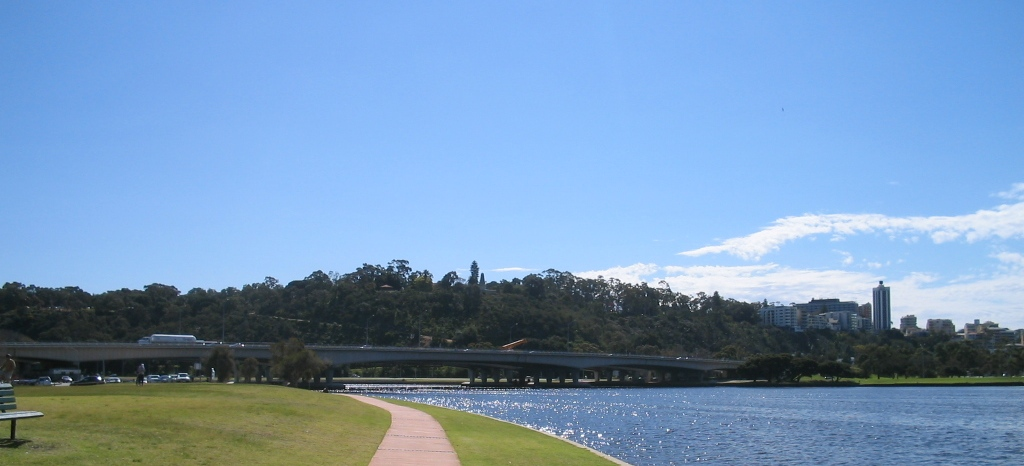
Kings Park from South Perth, overlooking the Narrows Bridge

Since before European settlement and exploration Mount Eliza has been known as Mooro Katta, Kaarta Gar-up, and Kaarta Koomba (meaning 'big hill'), the Aboriginal names given by the Noongar people. The area has been an important ceremonial and cultural place for the Whadjuk Noongar, who had campsites and hunting grounds in the area.

In the 1880s Kings Park was used by the Perth section of the Volunteer Rifle Corps (a civilian militia) for shooting.

At the base of the southern face is a freshwater spring, known as Kennedy Spring (Goonininup), which provided year-round water for the Aboriginal inhabitants and the first European visitors to the area, such as Willem de Vlamingh's party on 11 January 1697. The Lieutenant Governor of the Swan River Colony, James Stirling, chose the townsite of Perth for this reason – the only local spring. He named the area Mount Eliza for Eliza Darling.

The Colony's first Surveyor General, John Septimus Roe, recognised the qualities of the area and tried to protect it, by identifying the land to be set aside for public purposes. By 1835 Roe's protection was overturned and the first shipment of 5.1 tonnes (11,000 lb) of jarrah was cut on Mount Eliza, becoming the colony's first export. Logging in the area continued until 1871 when Roe's successor Malcolm Fraser persuaded the then Governor Weld to set aside 175 hectares (432 acres) as public reserve. This was enlarged in 1890 by 180 hectares (450 acres), and in 1897 the area of the reserve was further increased to 412 hectares (1,017 acres) by John Forrest, the first president of the Board appointed under the Parks and Reserves Act 1895. The area of Kings Park today is 400.6 hectares (990 acres), 11 hectares (27 acres) smaller than in 1897.

Officially opened on 10 August 1895, the park was originally called Perth Park and was renamed in 1901 to King's Park – the apostrophe was later dropped. This was to mark the ascension to the British throne of King Edward VII and the visit to Perth of George, the Duke of Cornwall and Princess Mary. One of the major roads through the park, May Drive, is named in the Princess's honour. Forrest planted the first tree, a Norfolk Island pine (Araucaria heterophylla), and other trees were introduced to the site, Eucalyptus ficifolia and exotic species of Pinus; few of these were successful due to lack of irrigation.

The Mount Eliza reservoir provided water to the local area, and still remains, but by arrangement of the lease was partly diverted for use in the park itself. This was largely allocated, after 1919, to the memorial oaks and planes lining May Drive. Their eventual failure led to their substitution with bangalay, Eucalyptus botryoides, and Eucalyptus calophylla var. rosea.

Attempts to situate an Olympic-size swimming pool on bushland in Kings Park led to the establishment in 1956 of a Citizens' Committee for the Preservation of Kings Park, which successfully campaigned to prevent the proposal from going ahead.

Since 1999, Kings Park has been administered by the Botanic Gardens and Parks Authority, who also administer Bold Park, and does not come under any local government authority. The park's administration building contains all the administrative offices where visitors may book guided walking tours, get information, or reserve one of the facilities.

Kings Park was featured in 2006 on the American reality TV show The Amazing Race 9 as well as in 2011 on the Australian franchise The Amazing Race Australia 1, where teams collected a clue from in front of the War Memorial.

In early 2009, the south western area of the park was severely damaged by a fire, which has been suspected to have been deliberately lit.

The Elizabeth Quay redevelopment plans include a cable car to Kings Park, although construction is not in scope for the initial phase.

== Panoramas ==
Perth central business district, from Kaarta Garup lookout June 2026

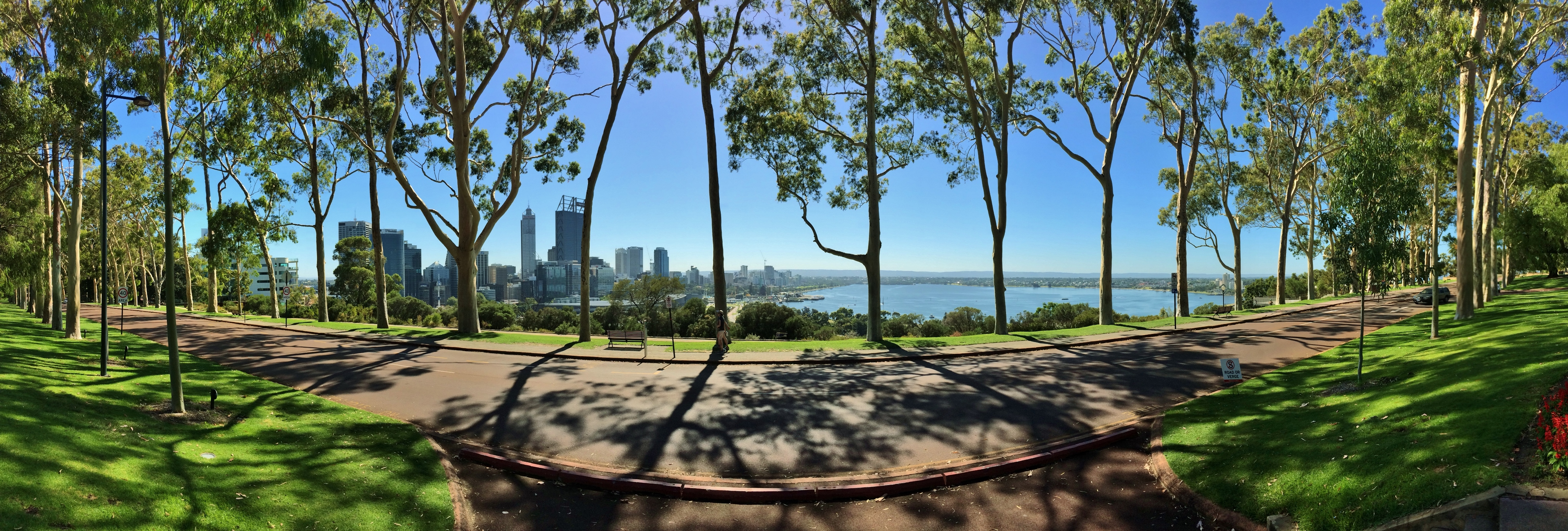
Panorama of lemon scented gums (Corymbia citriodora) along Fraser Avenue

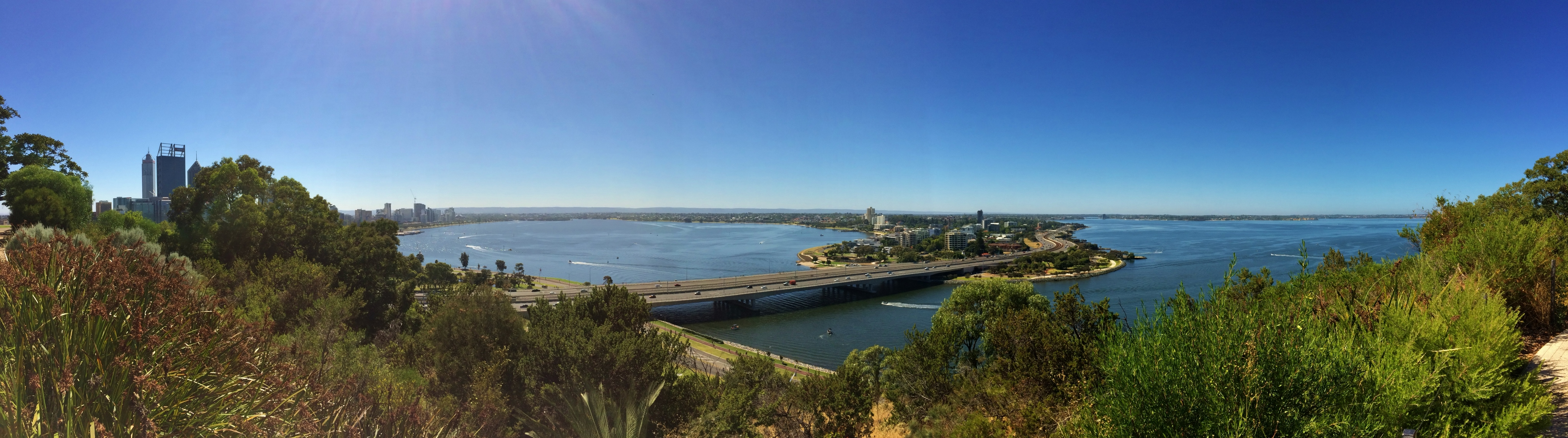
Panorama of Swan River, looking south from Kings Park

== Memorials ==
=== War memorial ===
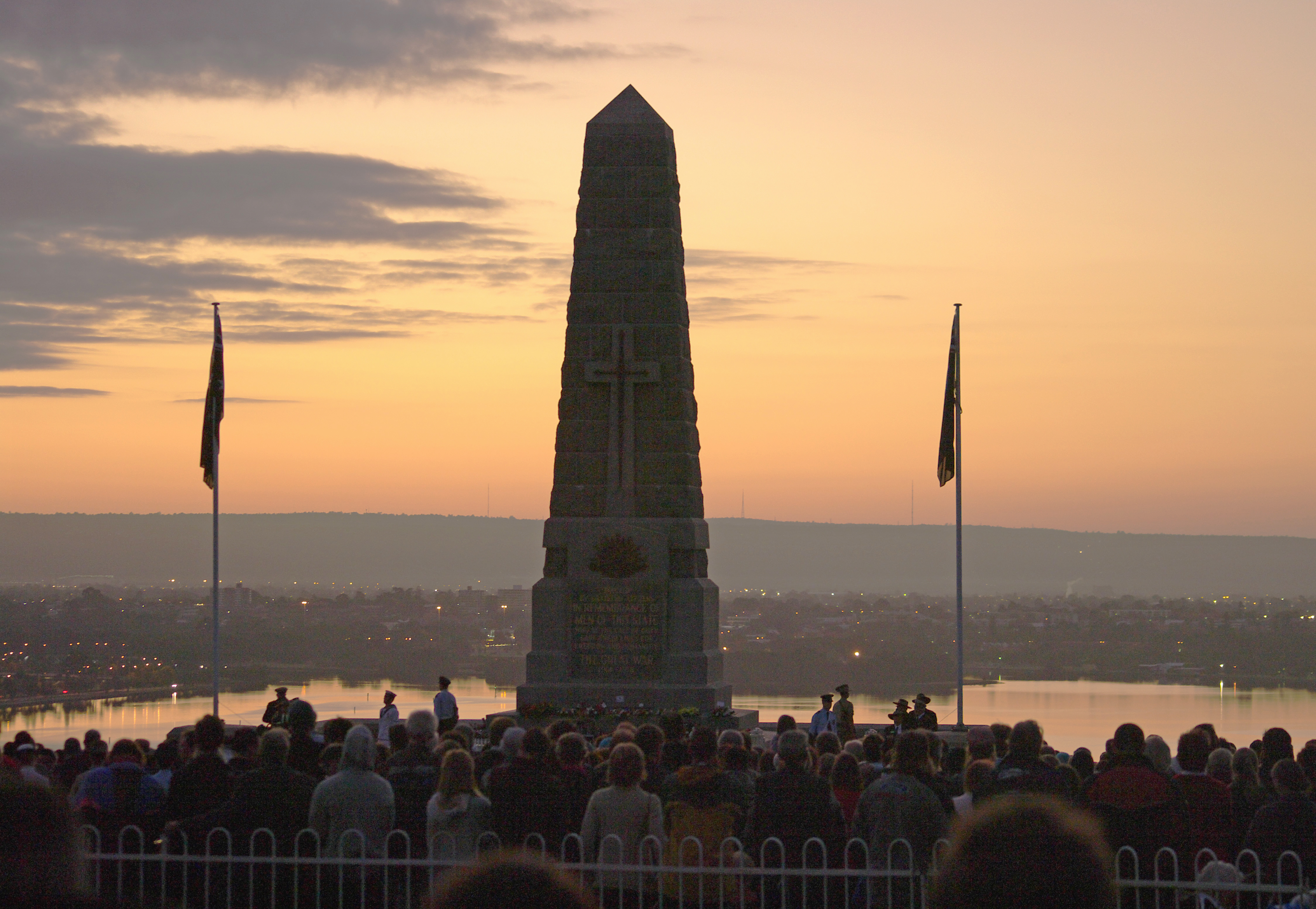
Dawn service, Anzac Day 2009

The State War Memorial Precinct is located on Mount Eliza overlooking Perth Water. It comprises the Cenotaph, Court of Contemplation, Flame of Remembrance and Pool of Reflection. The Anzac Day dawn service is held at 5:30 am on 25 April each year and is attended by more than 40,000 people. There is also an official service held at 11 am on 11 November for Remembrance Day.

The Cenotaph was unveiled in the year of the centenary of Western Australia, on 24 November 1929 by the Governor William Campion, and had as the honorary architect General J. Talbot Hobbs. The court of contemplation is at the western side of the precinct and was unveiled on 6 November 1955 by Charles Gairdner. The flame of remembrance and pool of reflection was inaugurated by Queen Elizabeth II on 1 April 2000.

Underneath the Cenotaph is the roll of honour with the names of all servicemen and women who enlisted in Western Australia and died in the Boer War, World War I, World War II, Korean War or Vietnam. In 2012, after some controversy the names of service personnel who died in Iraq and Afghanistan were inscribed on the wall. In addition, below the memorial is one of the entrances to the tunnels that are below Kings Park. These are not accessible to the public.

Distributed throughout the park are more specific memorials to various battles, military units, prisoners of war and other groups.

=== Honour avenues ===
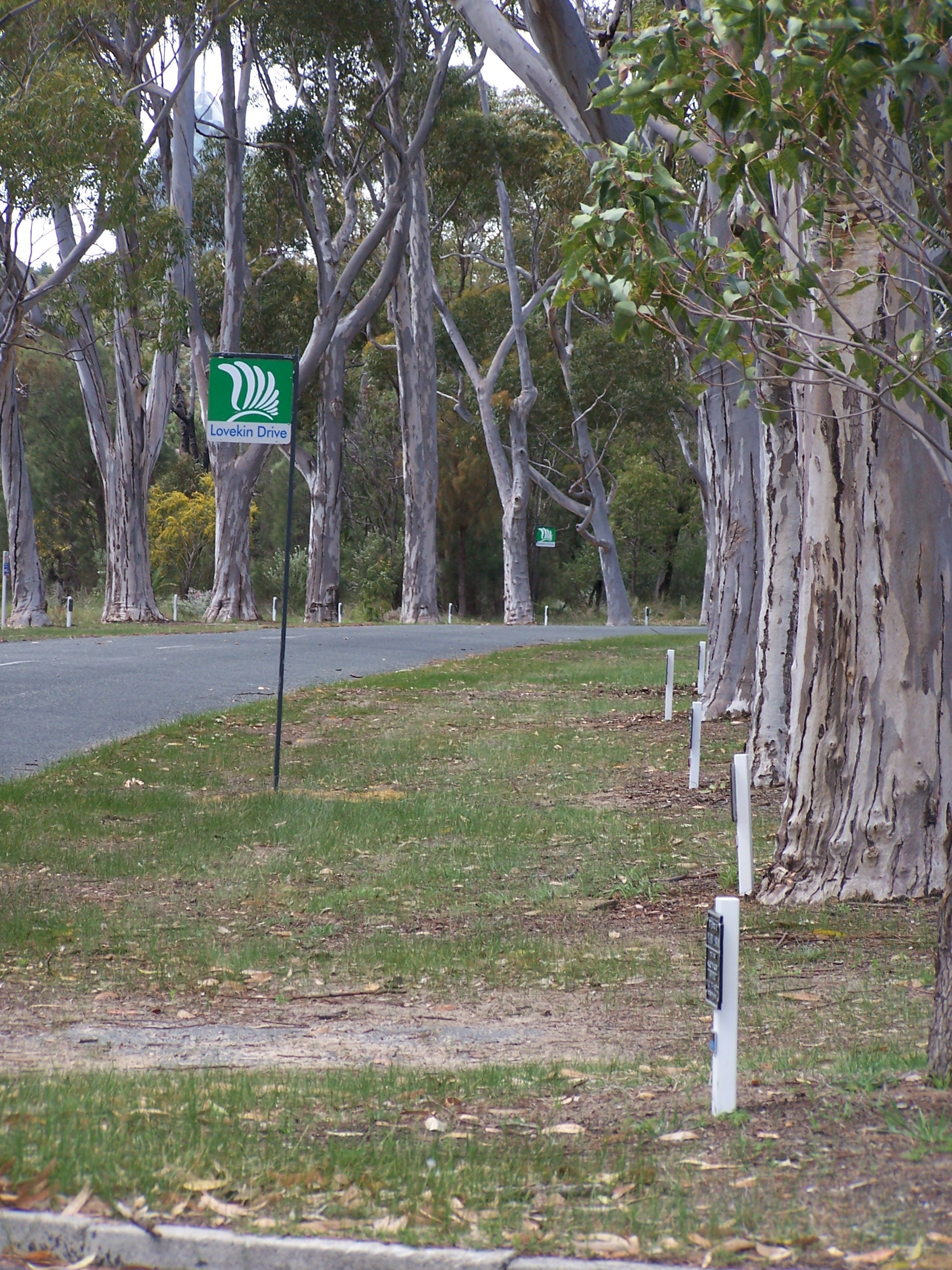
Sugar gums on Lovekin drive (one of the honour avenues) with plaques in front

The road verges through King Park have been planted with eucalyptus trees, and in front of each one is a plaque honouring those service men who died during action or as a result of wounds received; there are over 1600 of these plaques. Proposed by Arthur Lovekin, owner of the Daily News, the idea was based on the Avenue of Honour in Ballarat, Victoria. Originally families were required to pay 10 shillings, equivalent to A$39 in 2022, to cover the cost of the plantings; ex-servicemen provided the necessary labour to plant the trees. In 1920, Lovekin and board member William Loton each donated £A 500, in total equivalent to A$78,608 in 2022, to clear and plant Forrest Avenue with sugar gums. After Lovekin died the Kings Park board renamed Forrest Avenue to Lovekin Drive. Kings Park now has three tree-lined avenues set aside to honour service personnel who died in the two World Wars and other engagements: May Drive, Lovekin Drive, and (the most recent addition) Marri Walk.

=== Fraser Avenue ===
driving Faser Avenue

Fraser Avenue was originally planted with red-flowering gums (Corymbia ficifolia) in 1898 to celebrate the Diamond Jubilee of Queen Victoria, and added to in 1929 to celebrate the centenary of Western Australia. The gums were affected by patch canker disease in the 1930s. In 1938 lemon scented gum trees (Corymbia citriodora) were planted to honour the dignitaries and members of the centenary organising committee.

=== Edith Dircksey Cowan Memorial ===
The Edith Dircksey Cowan Memorial, formerly known as the Edith Cowan Memorial Clock, is the clock tower at the main entrance to, but not in, Kings Park. It was built in 1934 as a memorial to Edith Cowan, the first woman elected to any Australian parliament. The committee responsible for the memorial had intended that a memorial be built in the park, but controversially the Kings Park Board at the time declined the request, stating that henceforth only national memorials would be considered for inclusion within the park.

=== Pioneer Women's Memorial ===
The Pioneer Women's Memorial, a non-national memorial, was unveiled in 1968, 34 years after Edith Dircksey Cowan Memorial was built, and is located in the Western Australian Botanic Garden within Kings Park. It honours the contributions of pioneering women to the development of the city and state.

=== Centenary of Western Australian Women's Suffrage Memorial ===
The Centenary of Western Australian Women's Suffrage Memorial, also a non-national memorial, commemorates the hundredth anniversary of women achieving the right to vote equally with men in Western Australian elections.

=== Bali Memorial ===
This memorial is dedicated to the 16 Western Australian victims, the injured, and those who helped the survivors of the 2002 Bali bombings.

== Western Australian Botanic Garden ==
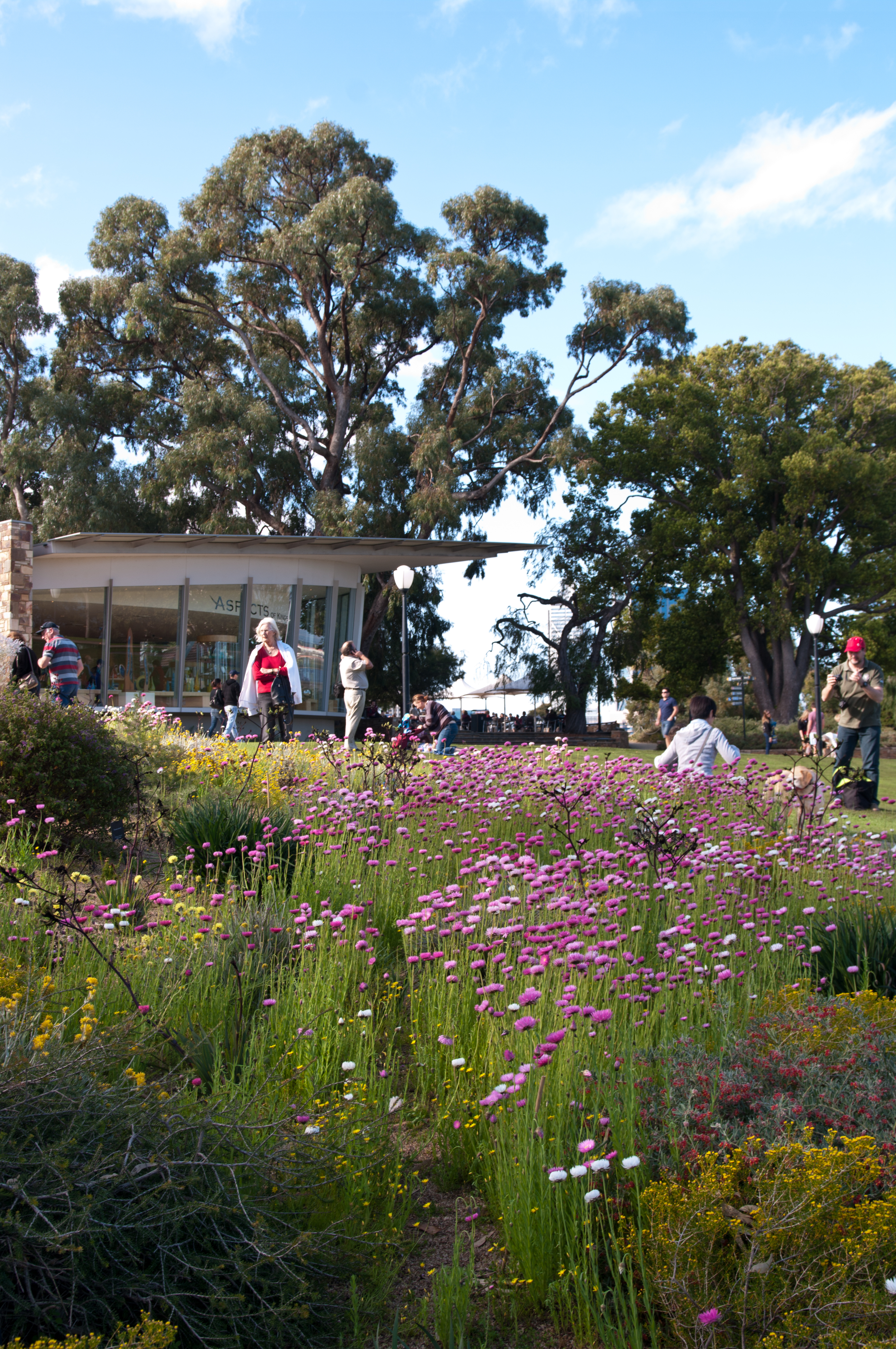
Botanic Garden

The Western Australian Botanic Garden is an 18-hectare (44-acre) site within the park. It has a collection of 2000 species of Western Australian flora on display. Western Australian Botanic Garden is part of the worldwide network of botanic gardens committed to plant conservation. The garden was designed by John Oldham, who held the position of Government Landscape Architect at the time. It was established to showcase the flora of Western Australia to those visiting Perth for the 1962 British Empire and Commonwealth Games, although the official opening did not take place until 4 October 1965. Western Australian Botanic Garden is today home to over half of Australia's 25,000 plant species and the following popular landmarks:

- Conservation Garden
- Gija Jumulu boab tree
- Pioneer Women's Memorial fountain and water garden
- Centenary of Western Australian Women's Suffrage Memorial
- Lotterywest Federation Walkway
Plants in Kings Park
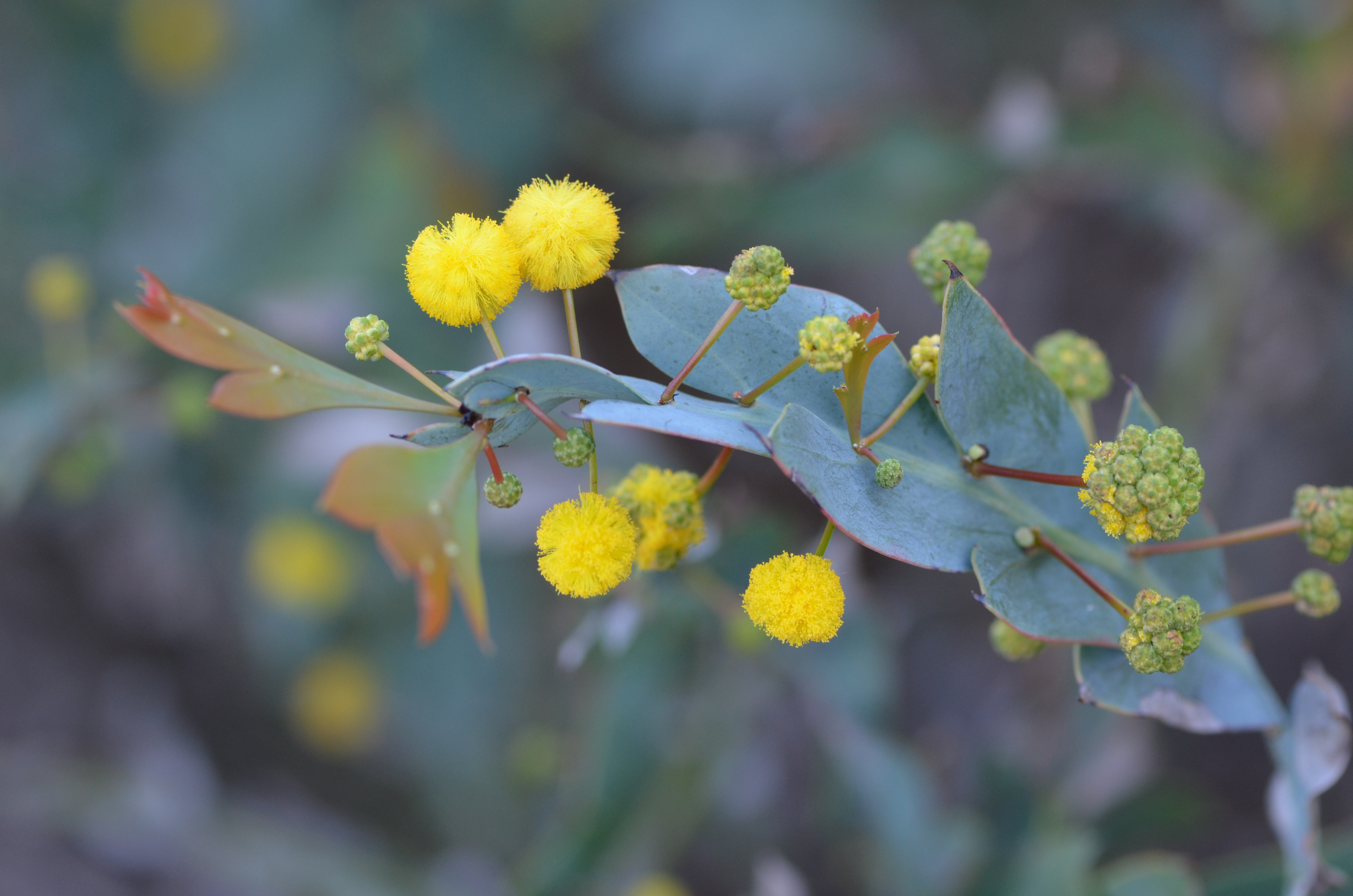
Acacia glaucoptera

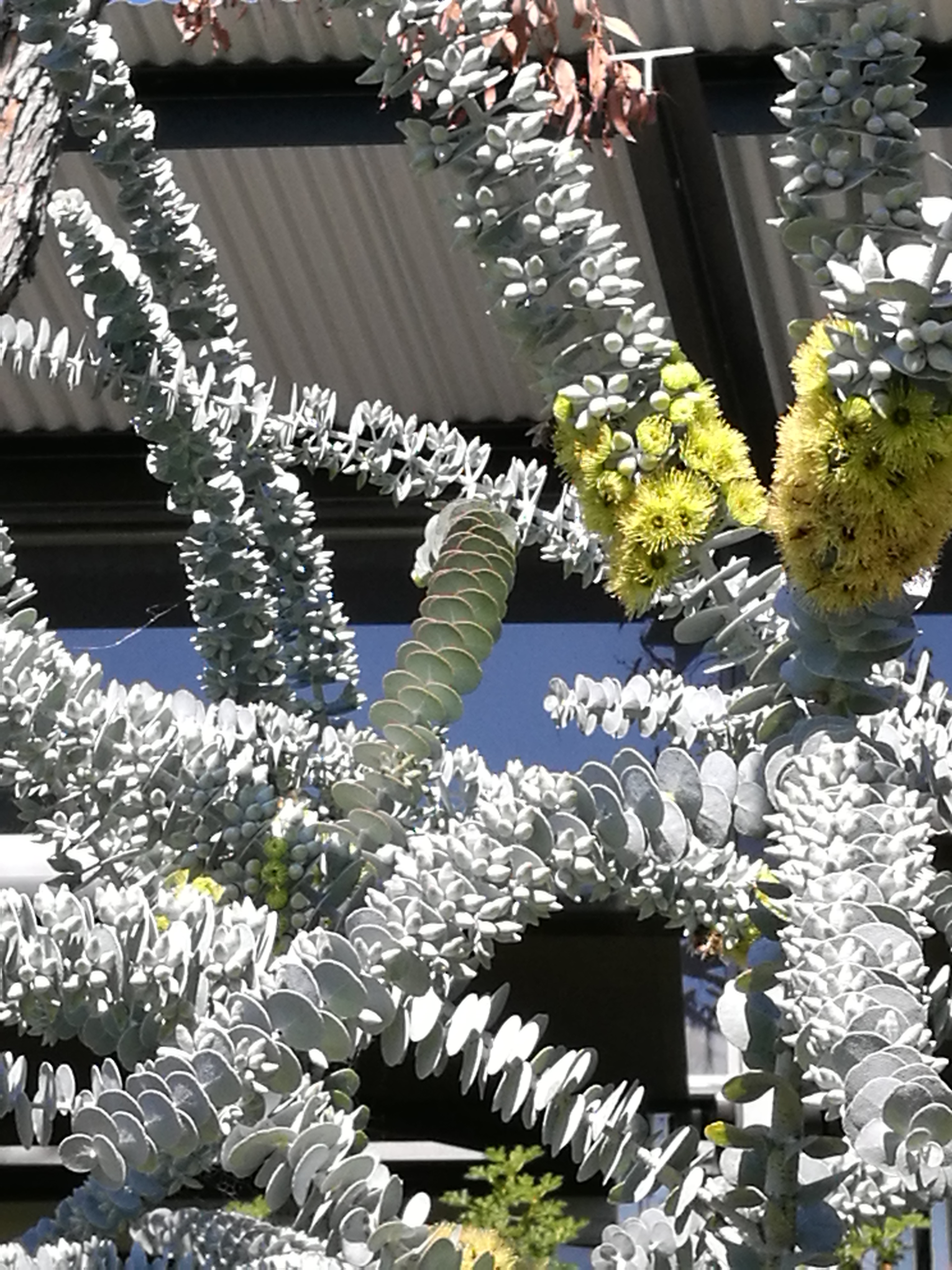
Eucalyptus kruseana

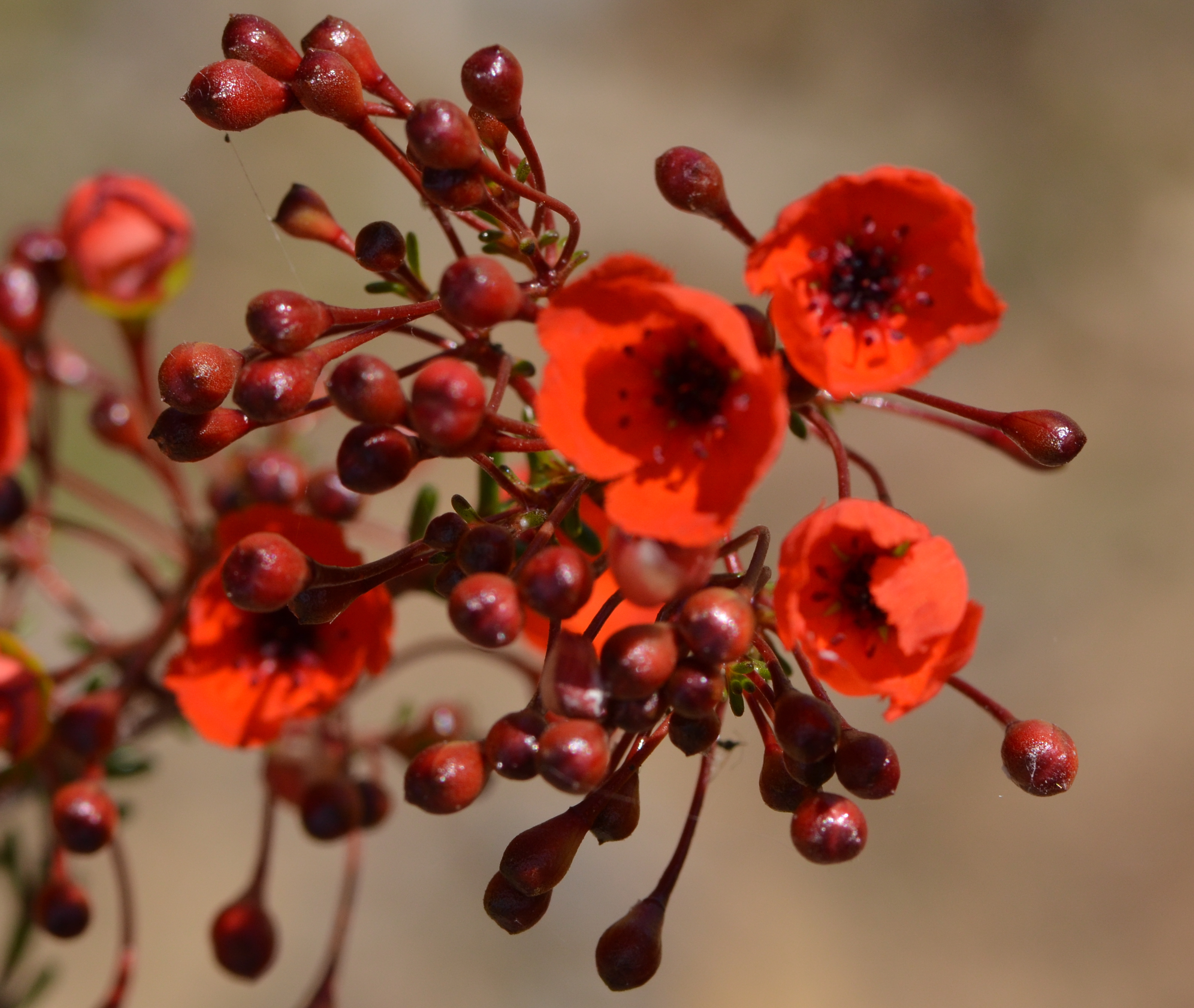
Pileanthus sp.

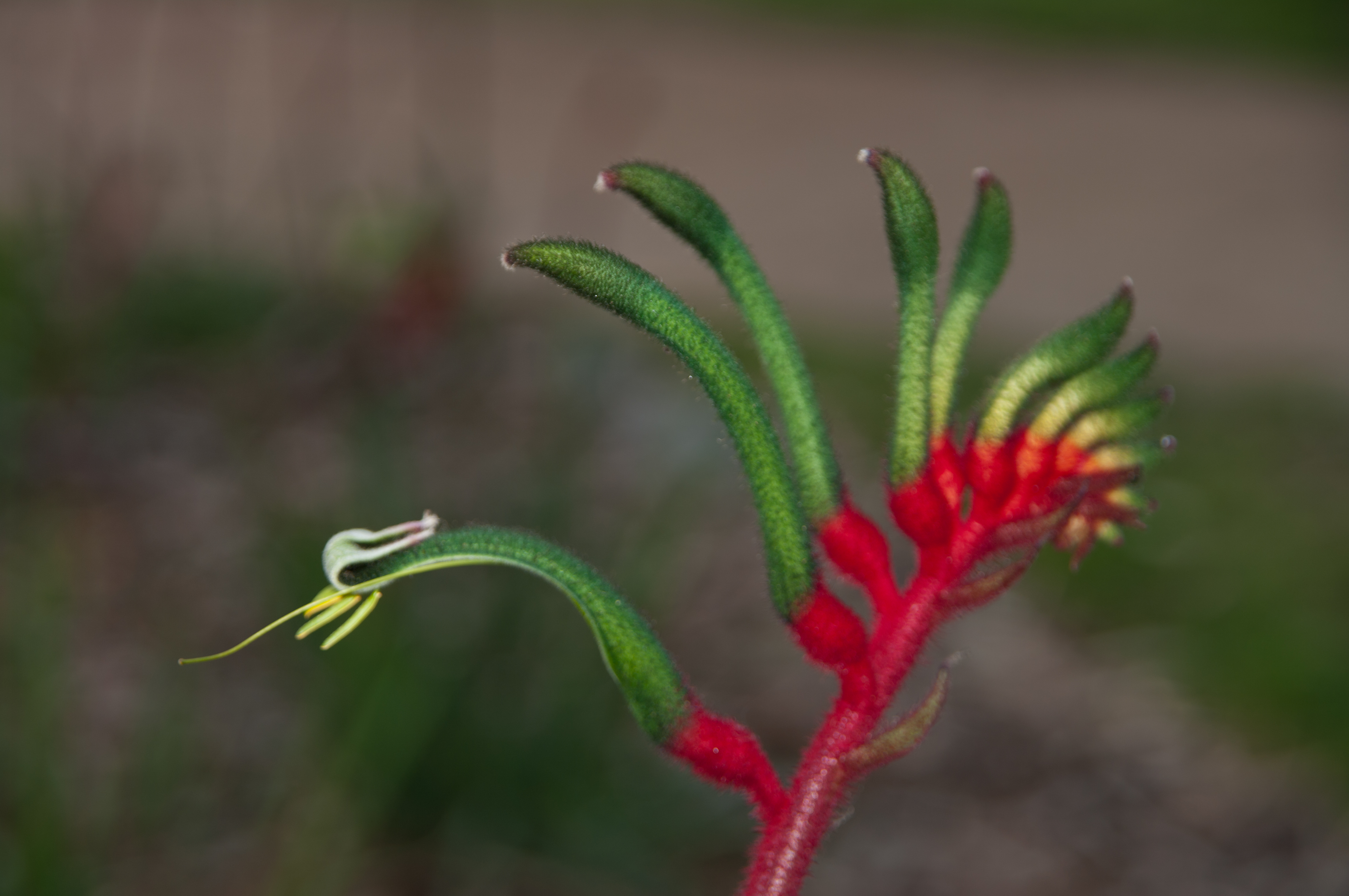
Anigozanthos manglesii

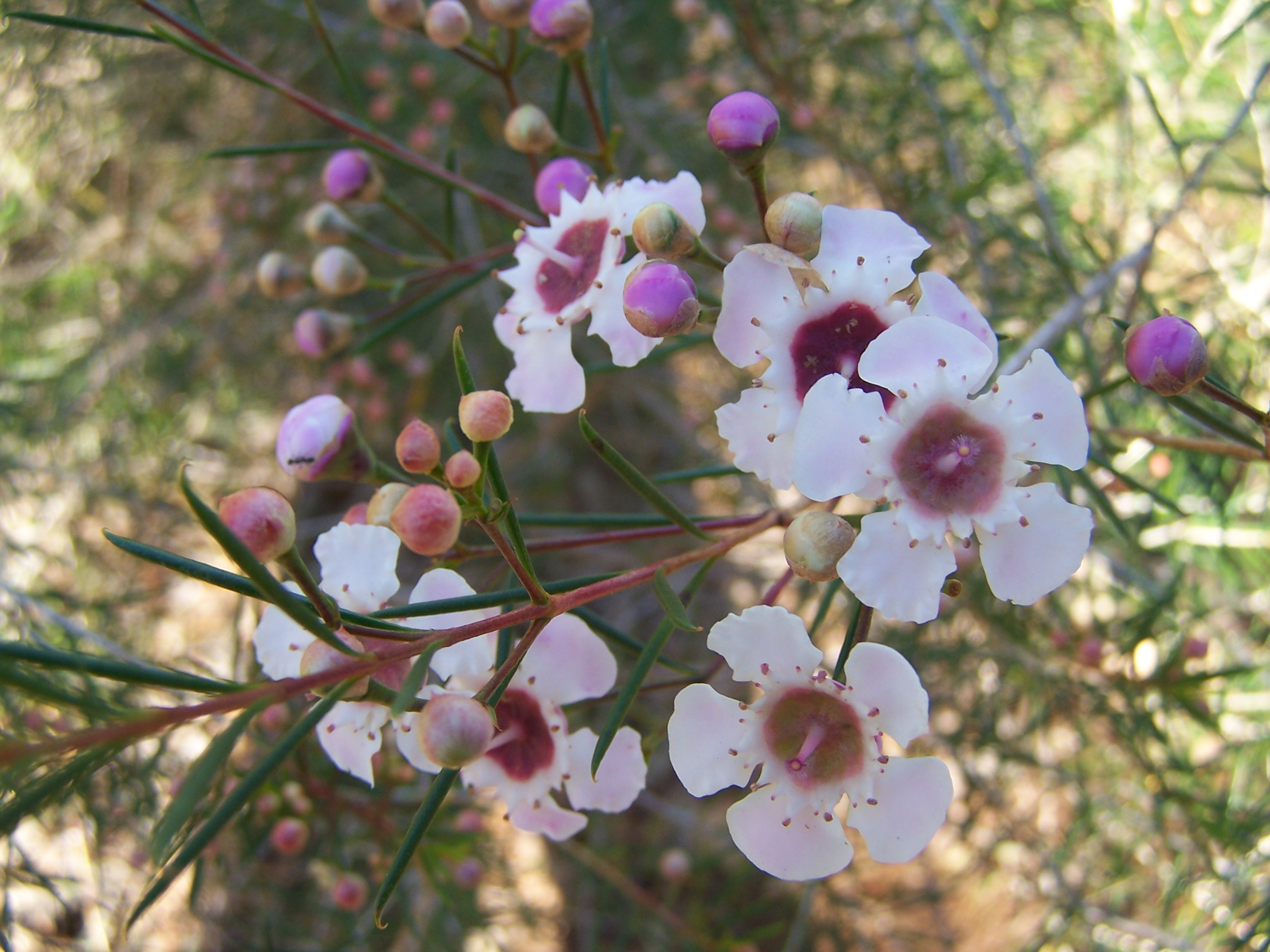
Chamelaucium uncinatum

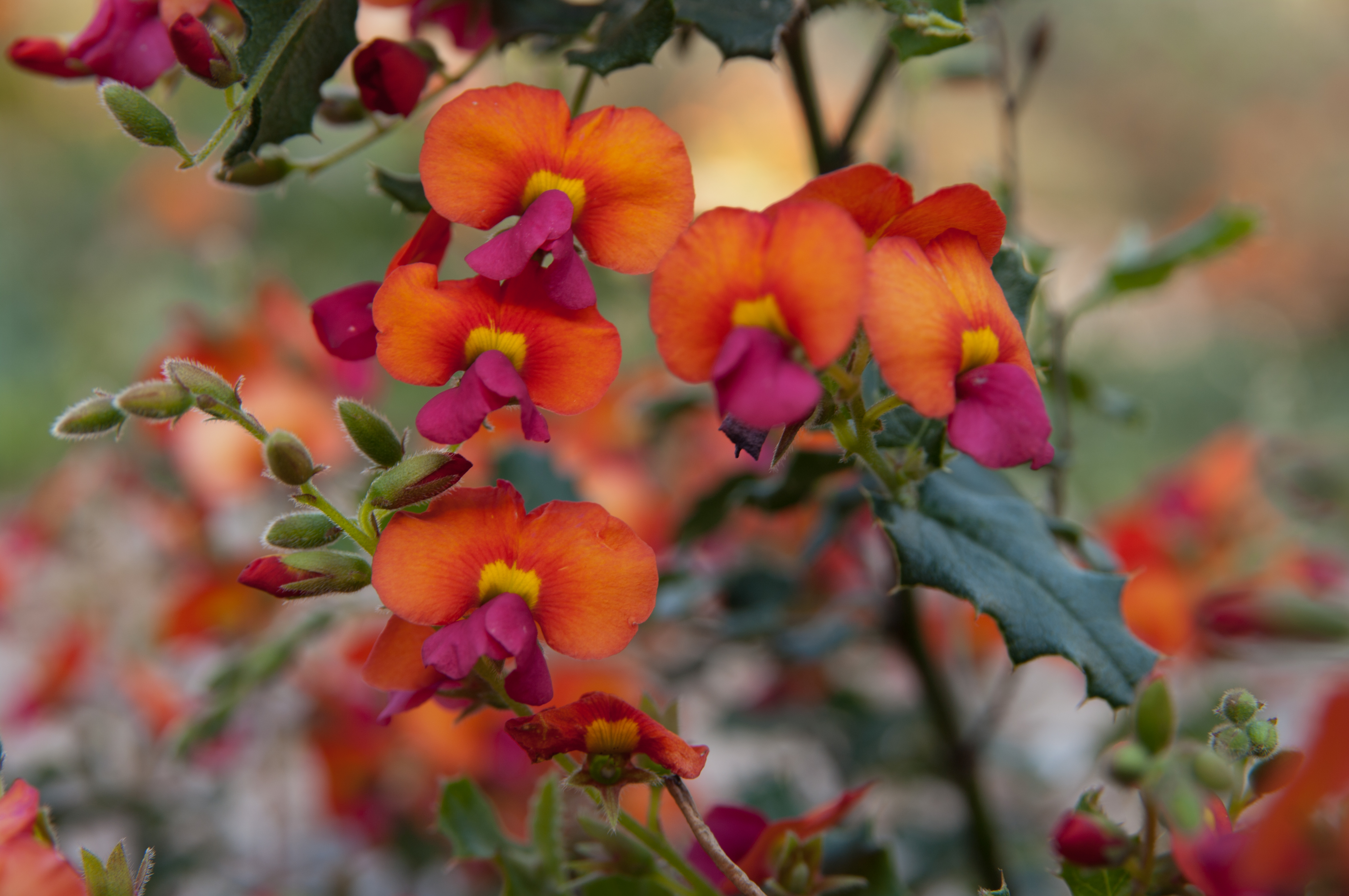
Chorizema varium

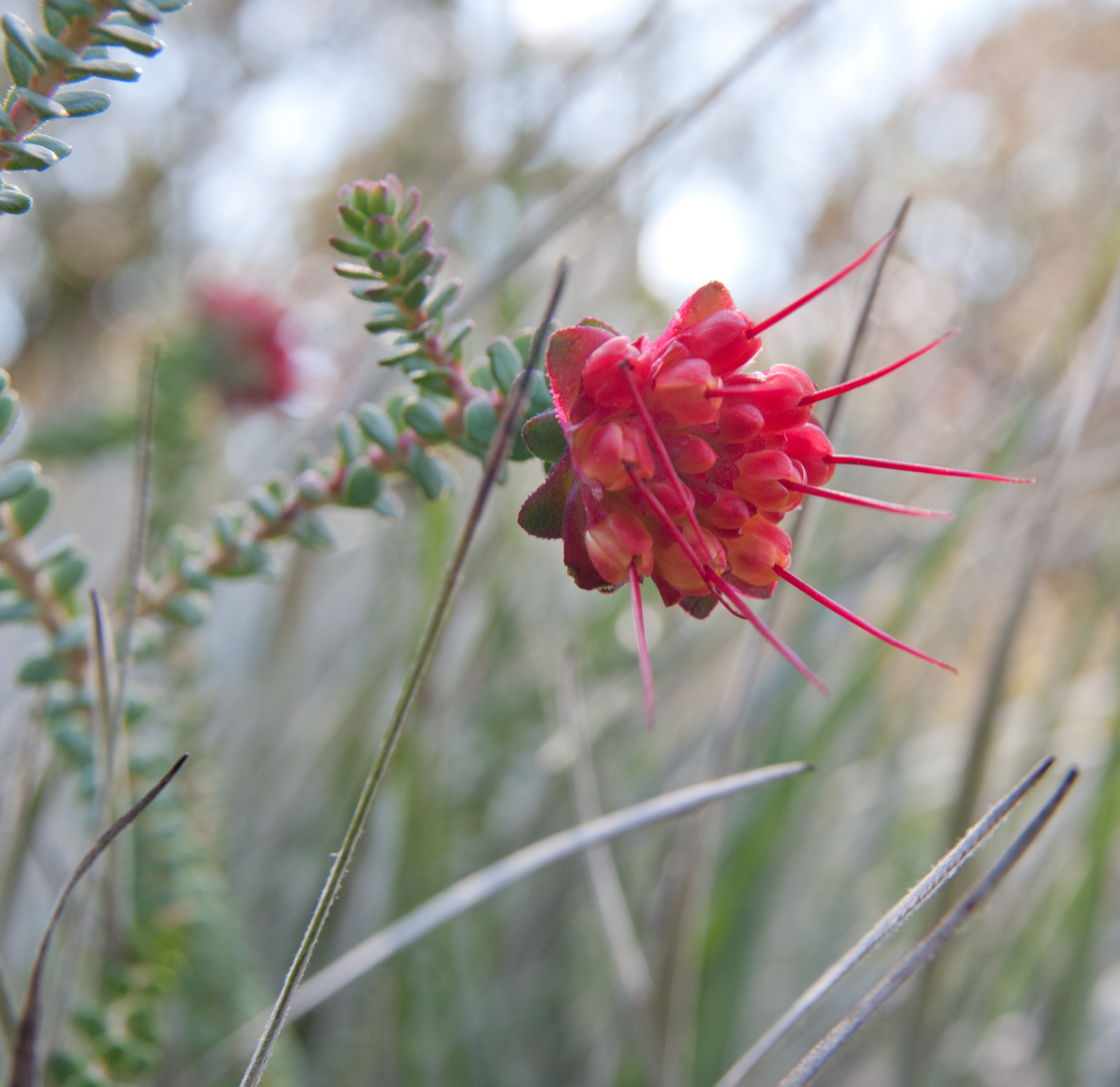
Darwinia oldfieldii

=== Science ===
The Science Directorate within the Botanic Gardens and Parks Authority is renowned for its research and scientific works, specialising in conservation and restoration of native species and ecosystems. The directorate is categorised into specific scientific areas including restoration ecology, seed science, conservation genetics, propagation science and orchid science, which are supported by many accredited research scientists and students.

=== Kings Park Festival ===
Beginning in 1965, the Kings Park Festival has grown to a month-long celebration of floral displays, live music, exhibitions, workshops, interpretive artworks, guided walks and family activities throughout September. Held to promote the beauty of Western Australia's native wildflowers, the event now attracts over 500,000 people annually.

Frequent visitor to Perth, and wildlife enthusiast Alistair McAlpine (1942–2014), began his 1999 memoir by praising the wildflowers of Kings Park:

If it is wildflowers that you dream of, go to Perth in Western Australia in September. There, in Kings Park, in over eight hundred hectares of natural bush in the middle of the city, are eight thousand species of wildflower. On those cool September mornings, their combined scent has a beauty I have never experienced elsewhere. Kangaroo paw, native iris, the banksia shrub–plants so exotic that have been collected for years and were growing in conservatories in Europe long before the State was settled.

== May Drive Parkland ==
The May Drive (formerly Synergy) Parkland is one of two children's playgrounds in Kings Park, the other being the Ivey Watson Playground. It includes a lake and island, play and climbing equipment for children, and life-sized model dinosaurs. It was formerly sponsored by Western Australian power company Synergy.

The Vietnam War memorial and Zamia café are located here.

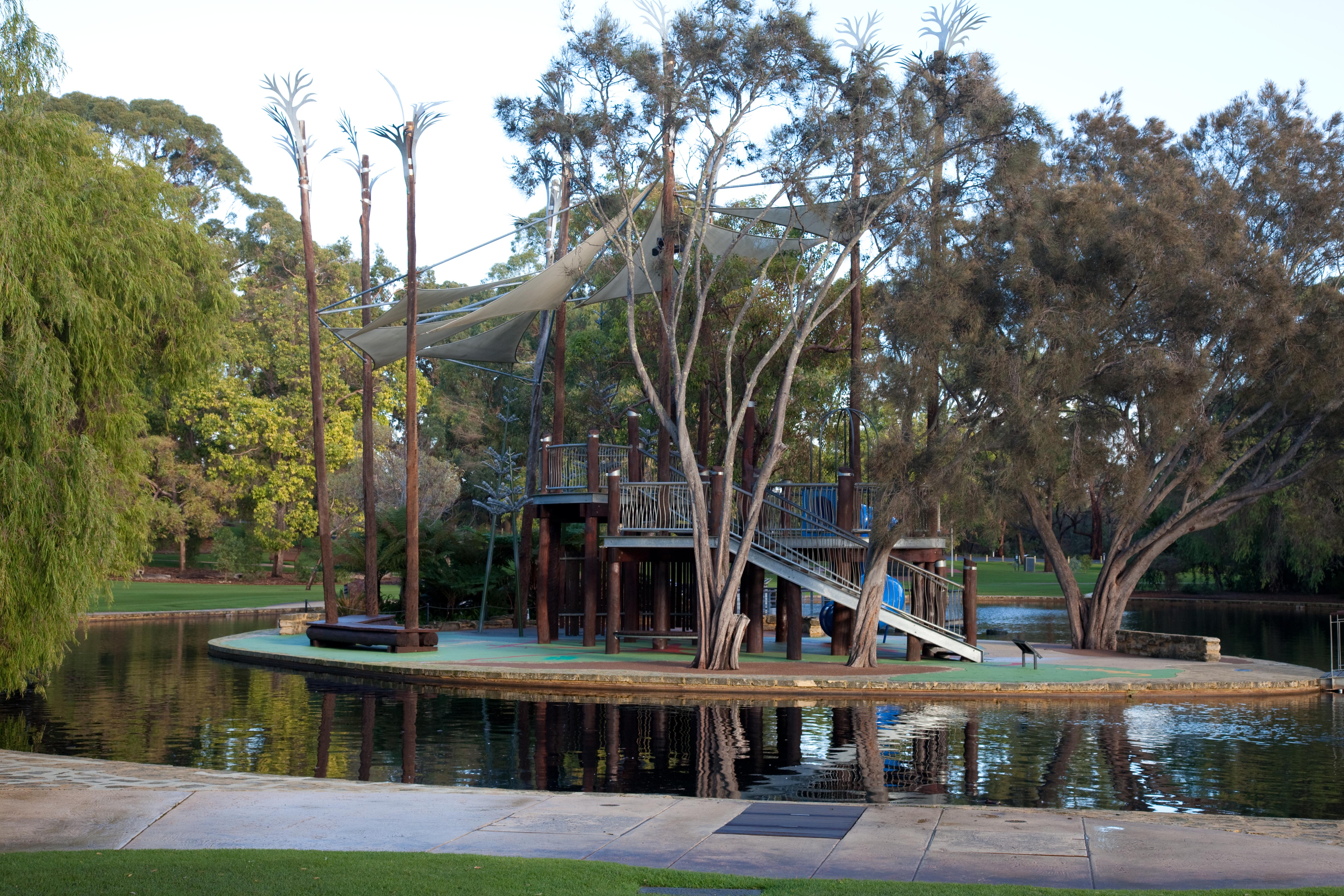
May Drive Parkland

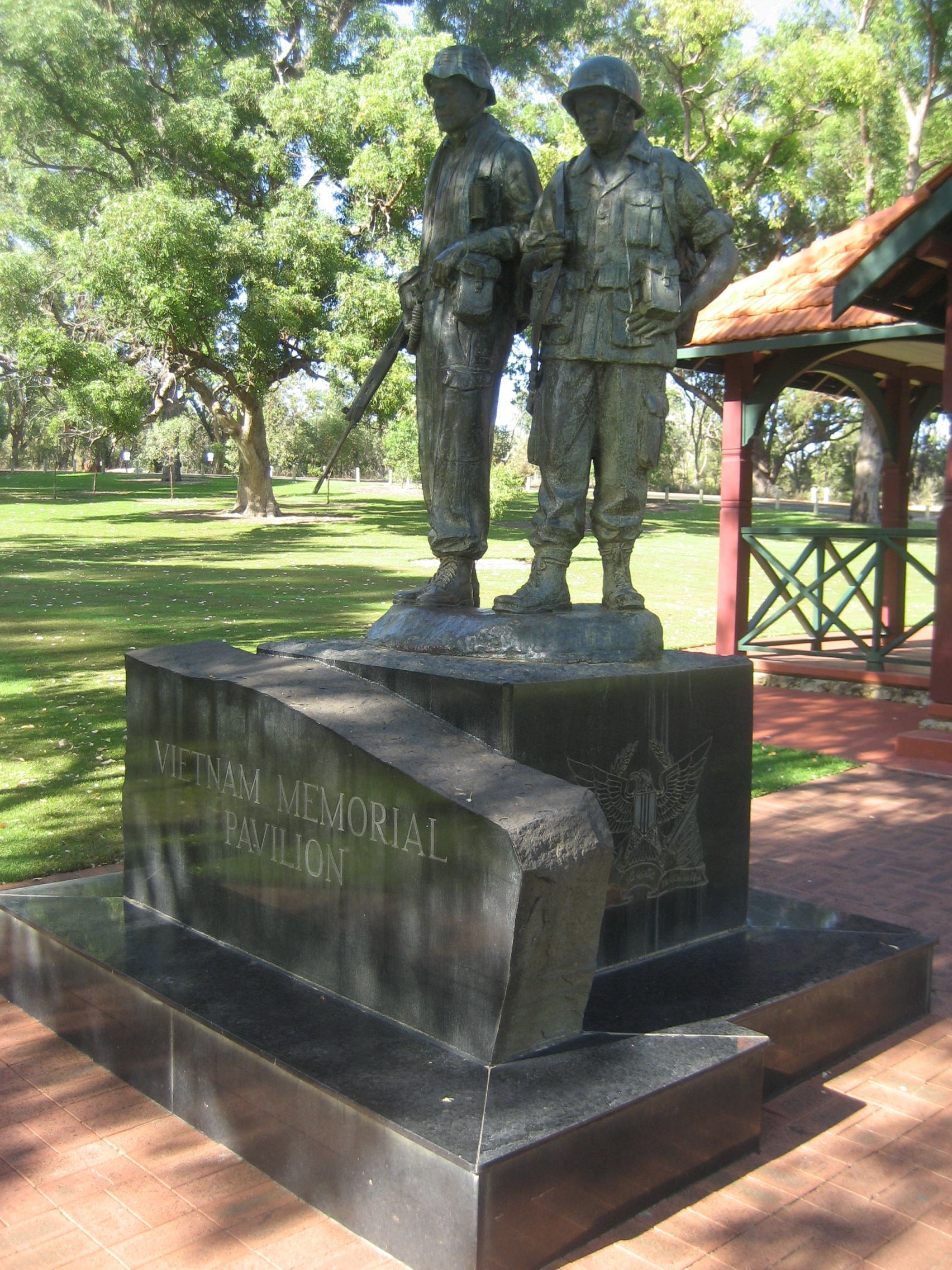
Vietnam memorial pavilion

== Lotterywest Family Area ==
This popular playground for young families is specifically targeted for children aged under five to encourage strong early childhood development. It was extensively refurbished in 2006 with funding from Lotterywest.

== Aboriginal Art Gallery ==
The Aboriginal Art Gallery is a retail outlet on Fraser Avenue that exhibits the works of Aboriginal artists from Western Australia and the Northern Territory.

== DNA Tower ==
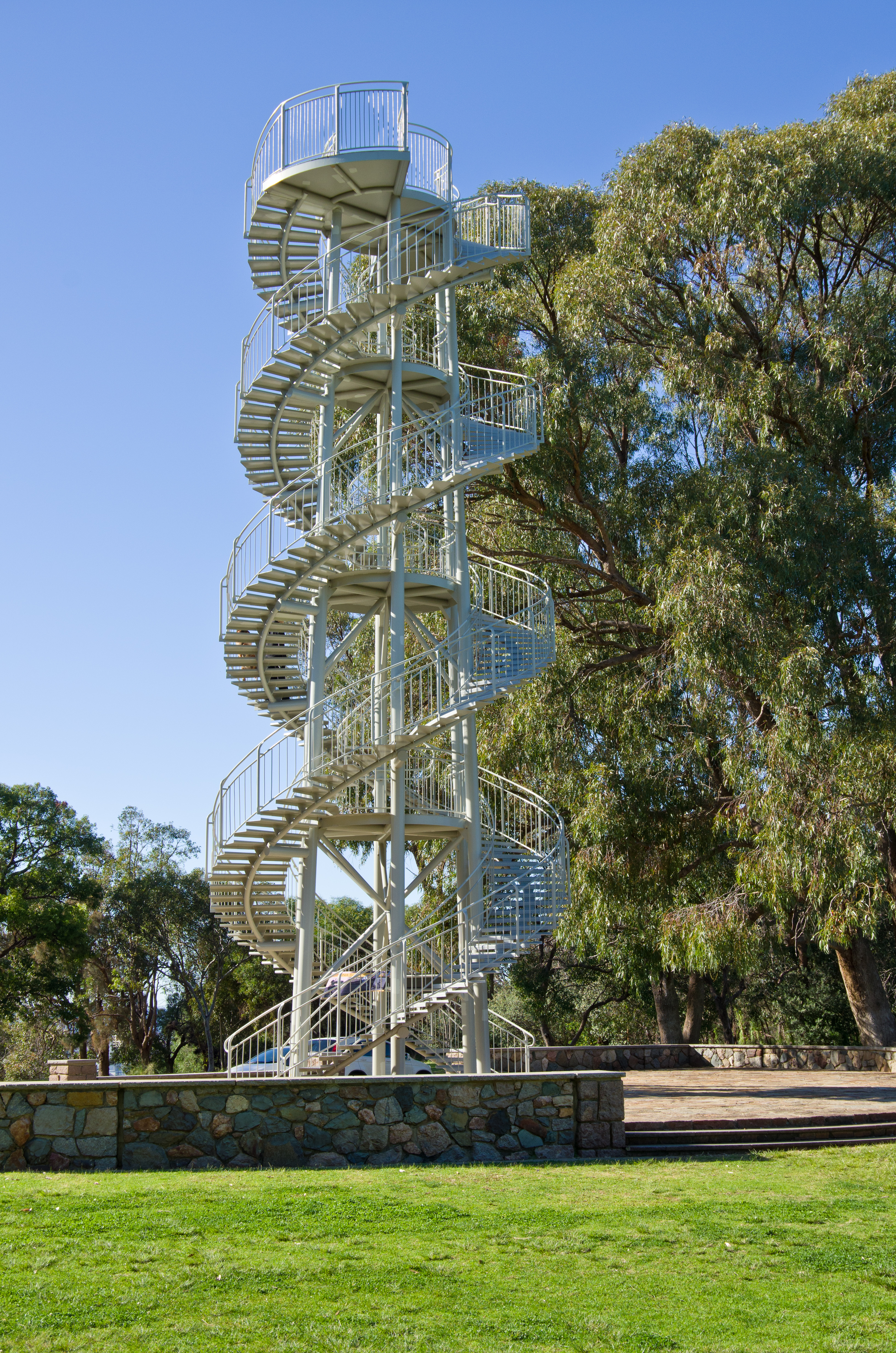
DNA Tower

Built on the highest point of the park in 1966, the DNA Tower is a white 15-metre (49 ft) high double helix staircase that has 101 steps and was inspired by a double staircase in the Château de Blois in France. Its design resembles the deoxyribonucleic acid (DNA) molecule. The paving below the DNA Tower is made with stones sent from 11 towns and 80 shires in Western Australia.

== Jacob's Ladder ==
Jacob's Ladder is a set of stairs located at the top end of Cliff Street, in the close proximity to Kings Park, though it is not part of the park itself. It has 242 steps and leads down to Mounts Bay Road. The stairs are a popular site for Perth residents to exercise, with many people using it in the mornings and on lunch breaks.

== Walks ==
=== Law Walk ===
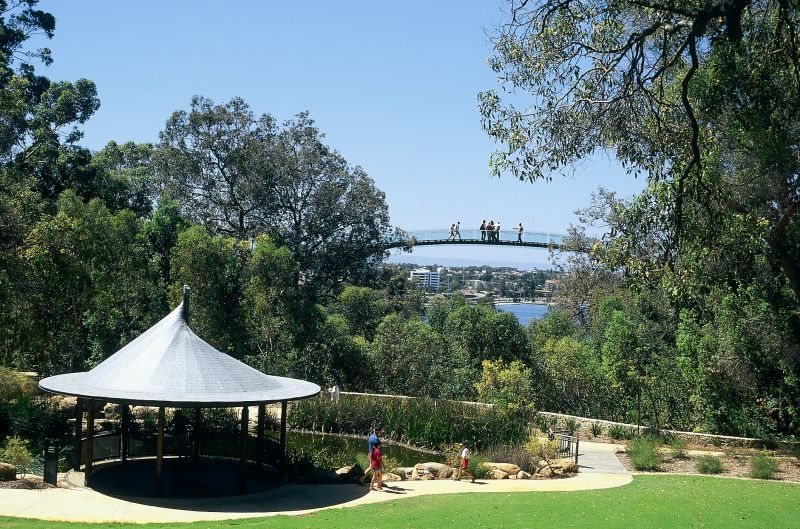
Lotterywest Federation Walkway

Law Walk is Kings Park's premier urban bushland trail. It is a 2.5-kilometre (1.6-mile) loop walk that begins at Rotunda Two and continues along the ridge of the limestone escarpment to Dryandra Lookout. A loop in the trail then leads to the Lotterywest Federation Walkway and back to the start of Law Walk, taking visitors approximately 45 minutes to complete.

=== The Kokoda Track ===
The Kokoda Track Memorial Walk is a tribute to the bravery of Australian troops who fought in the Papua New Guinea campaign of July 1942 to January 1943. The Kokoda Walk begins at Kennedy Fountain on Mounts Bay Road with a steep climb of 150 steps that ascends a height of 62 metres (203 ft).

=== Guided walks ===
Founded in 1984, the Kings Park Guides are a group of volunteers that lead guided walks all year round and help staff the Visitor Information Centre. Twice daily the guides provide guided walking tours of the monuments and memorials, bushland paths and the Botanic Garden.

The guides cover all aspects of the park including the local Noongar names and traditions. Walks are varied according to the Noongar seasons: Djilba-Kambarang (July–October) for the wildflower season, Makuru for May and June, and Birak-Djeran for November–April.

== Volunteers and community involvement ==
The Friends of Kings Park was established in 1993 to promote community involvement and commitment within Kings Park and Botanic Garden.

The Kings Park Volunteer Master Gardeners provide a free garden advisory service to the community and offer free advice on anything from propagation and potting to planting out and pests.

In 1922, the West Perth subbranch of the Returned Services League became responsible for the maintenance and preservation of the plaques along Kings Park's honour avenues. Today they are known as the Honour Avenues Group.

== See also ==
- Australia's Open Garden Scheme
- Gardening in Australia
- Heritage gardens in Australia

== General references ==
- Coy, Neil (1993). "Memorial Plaques in May Drive". For People and Plants (2, Winter). Kings Park: Friends of Kings Park: 1. "400 oaks were planted along May Drive in 1919 – only one survives."
