= Perth foreshore =

The Perth foreshore may refer to:

- The foreshore of Perth Water on either the northern or southern side of the Swan River, Western Australia
- Esplanade Reserve, the area between Perth Water and the Perth central business district, Western Australia
