= DevelopmentWA =

Western Australian land development agency

Agency overview
- Formed: 25 September 2019
- Preceding agencies: Metropolitan Redevelopment Authority; LandCorp
- Jurisdiction: Government of Western Australia
- Headquarters: Mia Yellagonga Tower 2, Perth
- Employees: 256 (30 June 2020)
- Annual budget: $256 million
- Minister responsible: John Carey, Minister for Lands
- Agency executives: Dean Mudford, chief executive; Darren Cooper, chairperson
- Child agencies: Metropolitan Redevelopment Authority; Western Australian Land Authority
- Website: developmentwa.com.au

DevelopmentWA is a land development agency of the Western Australian government. It was formed in September 2019 as a merger of the Metropolitan Redevelopment Authority and the Western Australian Land Authority, then known as Landcorp. DevelopmentWA now implements the requirements of both the Metropolitan Redevelopment Authority Act 2011, and the Western Australian Land Authority Act 1992. DevelopmentWA has an independent board of directors appointed by the state government and reports annually to Parliament. Collectively the agency delivers industrial, residential and commercial projects of strategic importance to the state. In 2019-20, the agency returned a profit of $60.1 million to the government.

DevelopmentWA continues to implement projects initiated the former redevelopment authorities for East Perth, Subiaco, Midland and Armadale. Projects overseen by DevelopmentWA include Elizabeth Quay, Perth City Link, Perth Cultural Centre and Yagan Square.

The agency jointly operates the Australian Marine Complex, together with the Western Australian Department of Jobs, Tourism, Science and Innovation and AMC Management (WA) Pty Ltd.

Former Premier of Western Australia, Alan Carpenter, served on the board of DevelopmentWA from September 2020 until retiring in December 2021.
