= Spanda =

Spanda may refer to:

- Spanda, a Tantric term meaning "cosmic pulsation” in Kashmir Shaivism
- Spanda (Australian art work)
