= Christian de Vietri =

Australian artist

Christian de Vietri CitWA
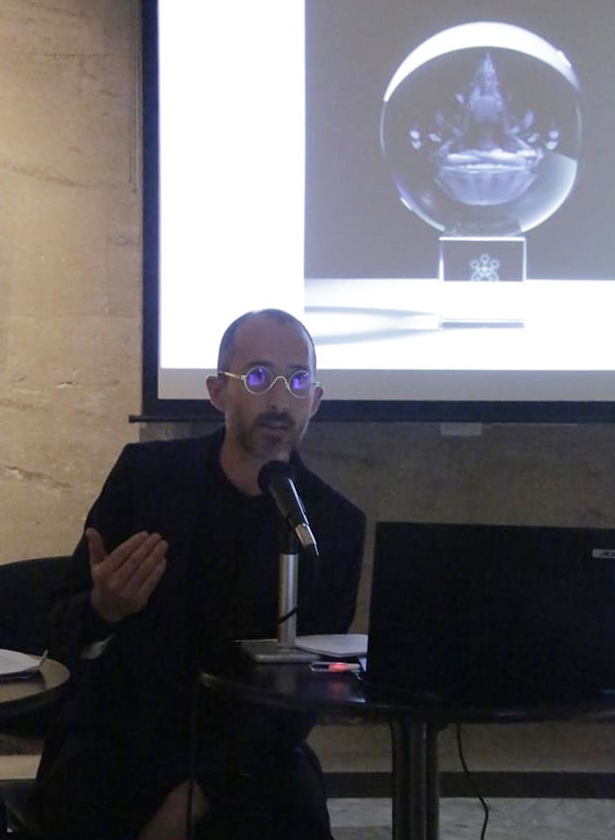
- De Vietri in 2020
- Born: 14 July 1981 (age 45); Kalgoorlie, Western Australia, Australia
- Education: Curtin University Perth (Bachelor of Fine Art 1999-2001); École Nationale Supérieure des Beaux-Arts Paris (Honors 2002); École des Beaux-Arts de Marseille (Post Diplôme 2005); Columbia University New York (Master of Fine Art 2007-2009); American University of Mayonic Science and Technology (Vāstu)
- Website: christiandevietri.com

Christian de Vietri (born 14 July 1981) is an Australian artist known for his large-scale public sculptures and traditional artwork based in Śilpaśāstra. In 2024, he published Trika Maṇḍala Prakāśa, the first comprehensive exposition of the mandalas described in Abhinavagupta’s Tantrāloka.

== Education ==
Christian de Vietri attended Hale School, a boys' secondary school located in the northern suburbs of Perth. In 2001, De Vietri completed a Bachelor of Fine Art degree at Curtin University. He was included annually on the Vice Chancellor's list as an academic commendation during his undergraduate years. As part of his training he then studied online for a graduate diploma from an Art College in Marseilles. De Vietri undertook and graduated from the Columbia University Master of Fine Art program in 2009. As part of this program, he was mentored by the artist Liam Gillick.

De Vietri studied Kashmir Śaivism under the tutelage of Christopher H. Wallis, Mark S. G. Dyczkowski, and Paul Muller-Ortega. He learnt Haṭha Yoga of the Mahāsiddha tradition from Dharmabodhi Sarasvatī and was certified by him as a teacher in 2016.

== Career ==
=== Commissions ===
Prominent public commissions by de Vietri include:

- Destination Day, Forrest Place, Perth Australia, 2005 (Commissioned by the City of Perth)
- X, Socrates Sculpture Park, New York USA, 2009 (commissioned by Socrates Sculpture Park)
- The Gathering, Metrotech, New York USA, 2009 (commissioned by the Public Art Fund)
- Ascalon (with Marcus Canning), St Georges Cathedral, Perth Australia, 2011 (commissioned by Mark Creasy)
- Spanda, Elizabeth Quay, Perth Australia, 2016 (commissioned by the MRA)
- Karlkurla, Kalgoorlie Australia, 2023 (commissioned by the City of Kalgoorlie)
- Between Heaven and Earth, Zhengzhou Grand Emporium, Zhengzhou China, 2018 (commissioned by ZhengHong Property)
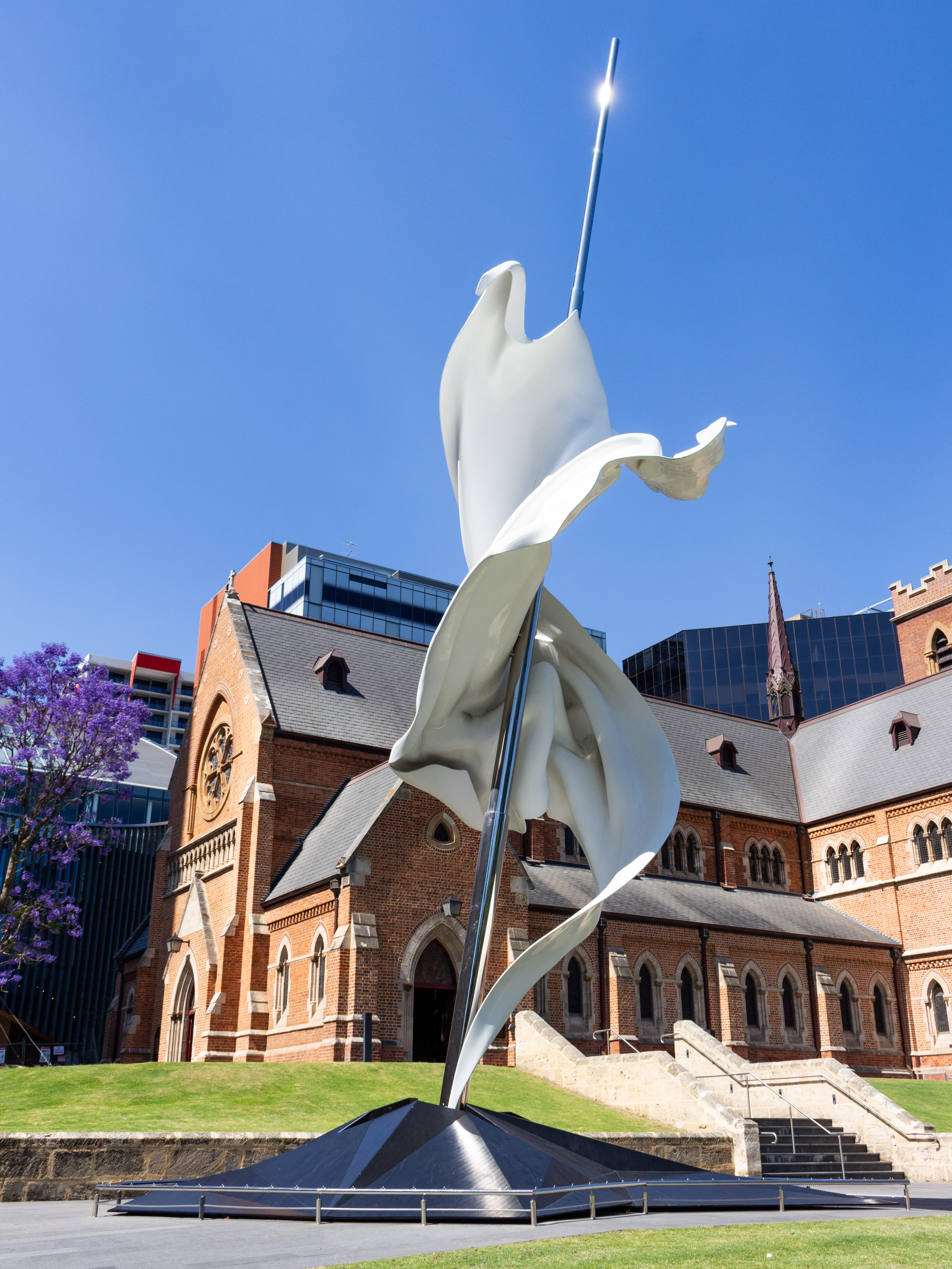
Ascalon

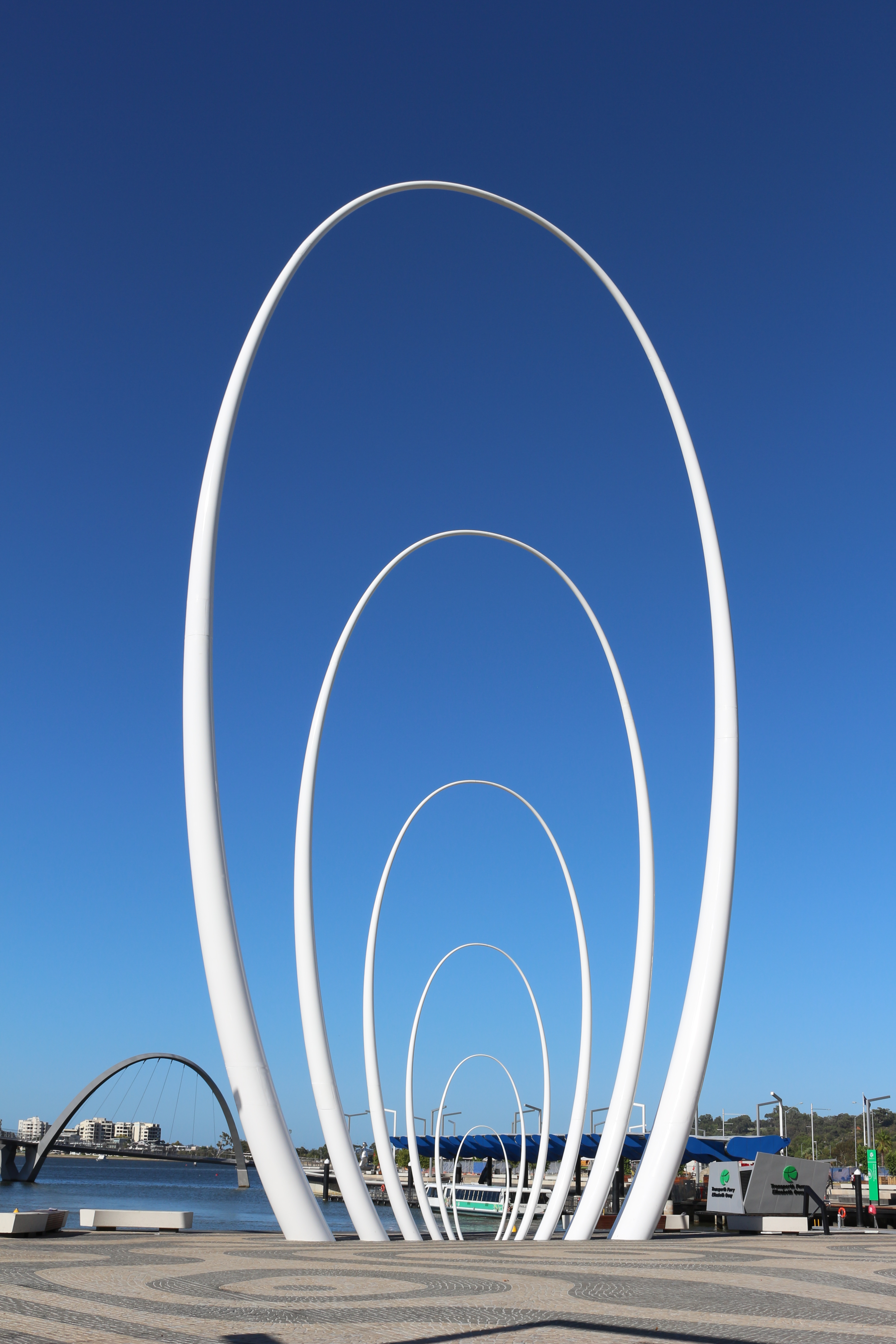
Spanda

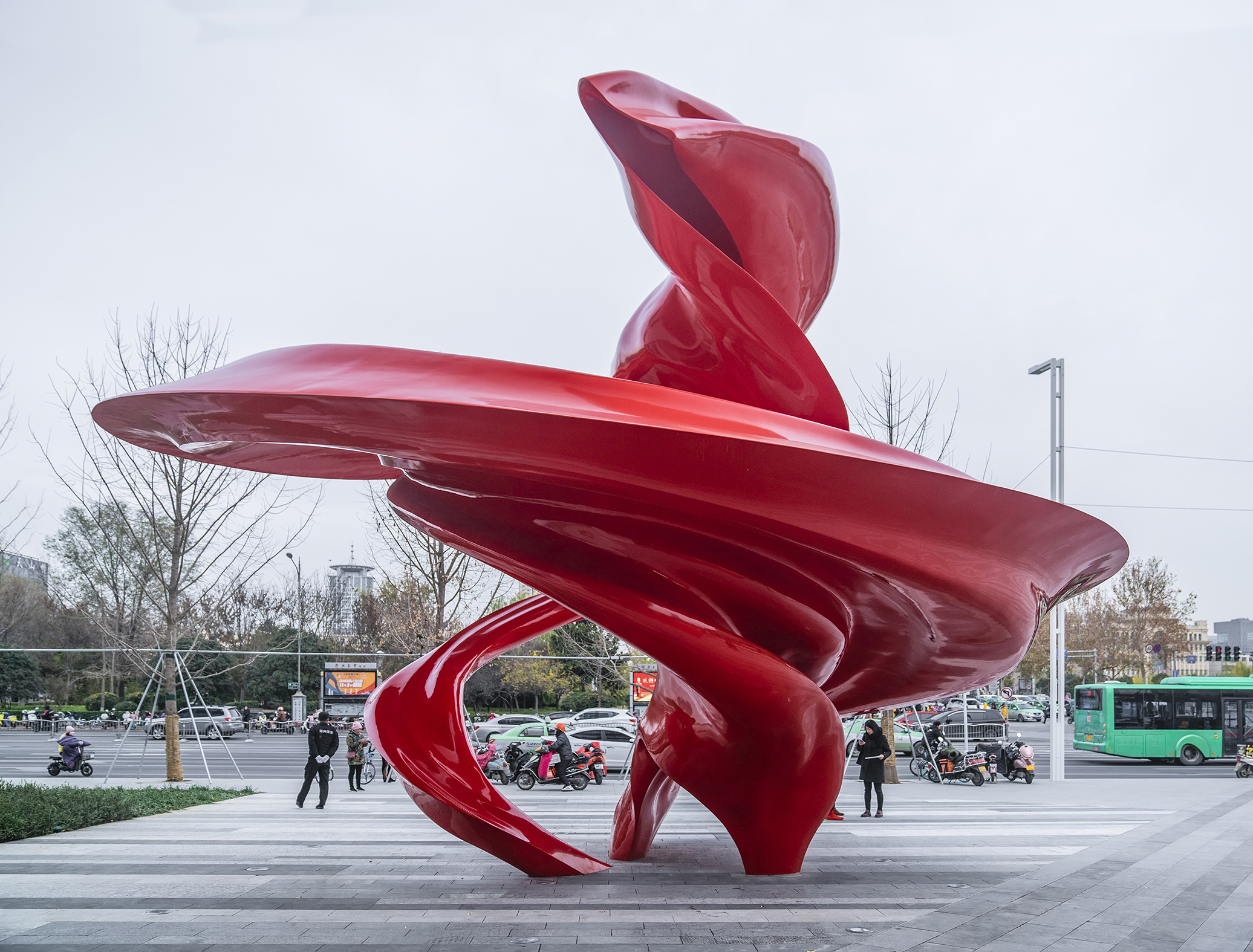
Between Heaven and Earth

=== Exhibitions ===
De Vietri's sculptures have been exhibited internationally at institutions such as Columbia University Wallach Gallery (New York), National Gallery of Bulgaria (Sofia), Art Gallery of New South Wales (Sydney), Gallery of Modern Art (Brisbane), TarraWarra Museum of Art (Healesville), Museum of Contemporary Art (Sydney), National Gallery of Australia (Canberra), Institute of Contemporary Art (Perth).

=== Collections ===
De Vietri's artworks have been acquired by several public collections including Art Gallery of New South Wales (Sydney), Art Gallery of Western Australia (Perth), Emily Fisher Landau Collection (New York), Axel Nordin Collection (Stockholm), Aïshti Art Foundation (Beirut), Gallery of Modern Art Collection (Brisbane), Kerry Stokes Collection (Perth), John Curtin Gallery Collection (Perth), Curtin University Collection (Perth), Artbank Collection (Melbourne), Art&Australia Collection.

=== Other activities ===
De Vietri undertook an internship at the Palais de Tokyo Site de Création Contemporaine, in Paris 2002. Later in 2002, de Vietri supported Heather Webb and Ben Riding to produce an artistic event that saw 50 artists overrun the Rhodes Hotel in Perth. De Vietri taught elective Sculpture classes at Curtin University in Perth and was a sessional sculpture tutor at Columbia University. De Vietri produced the music video "Brats" (by the band Liars) directed by Ian Cheng. In 2012/2013, Cheng and de Vietri co-wrote the script for a feature-length film. De Vietri and his sculptures are featured in a documentary by Benjamin Joel Cran about Mark S.G. Dyczkowski.

== Awards ==
Several awards and grants have been bestowed upon de Vietri for his work as an artist. At age 23, he was included in Australia's National Sculpture Prize exhibition . In 2003 he was recognised in Western Australia for a Citizen of the Year Award for his local contribution to Visual Art. He also received funding to make new work awarded by the Australia Council in 2009.

Other funding the artist has attracted includes the Socrates Sculpture Park Fellowship 2009 to pay for the manufacture of a sculpture to be displayed on Long Island, USA; publication within Art & Australia Magazine's Emerging Artist feature page in 2006, Peoples Choice Award for the National Gallery of Australia National Sculpture Prize 2005, Arts Western Australia New Concepts Grant 2005, Australia Council New Work Grant 2005, Qantas Spirit of Youth Fine Art Award 2004, Nescafe Big Break Art Award 2004 for a small business start-up.
