= Florence Hummerston Kiosk =

Building in Perth, Western Australia

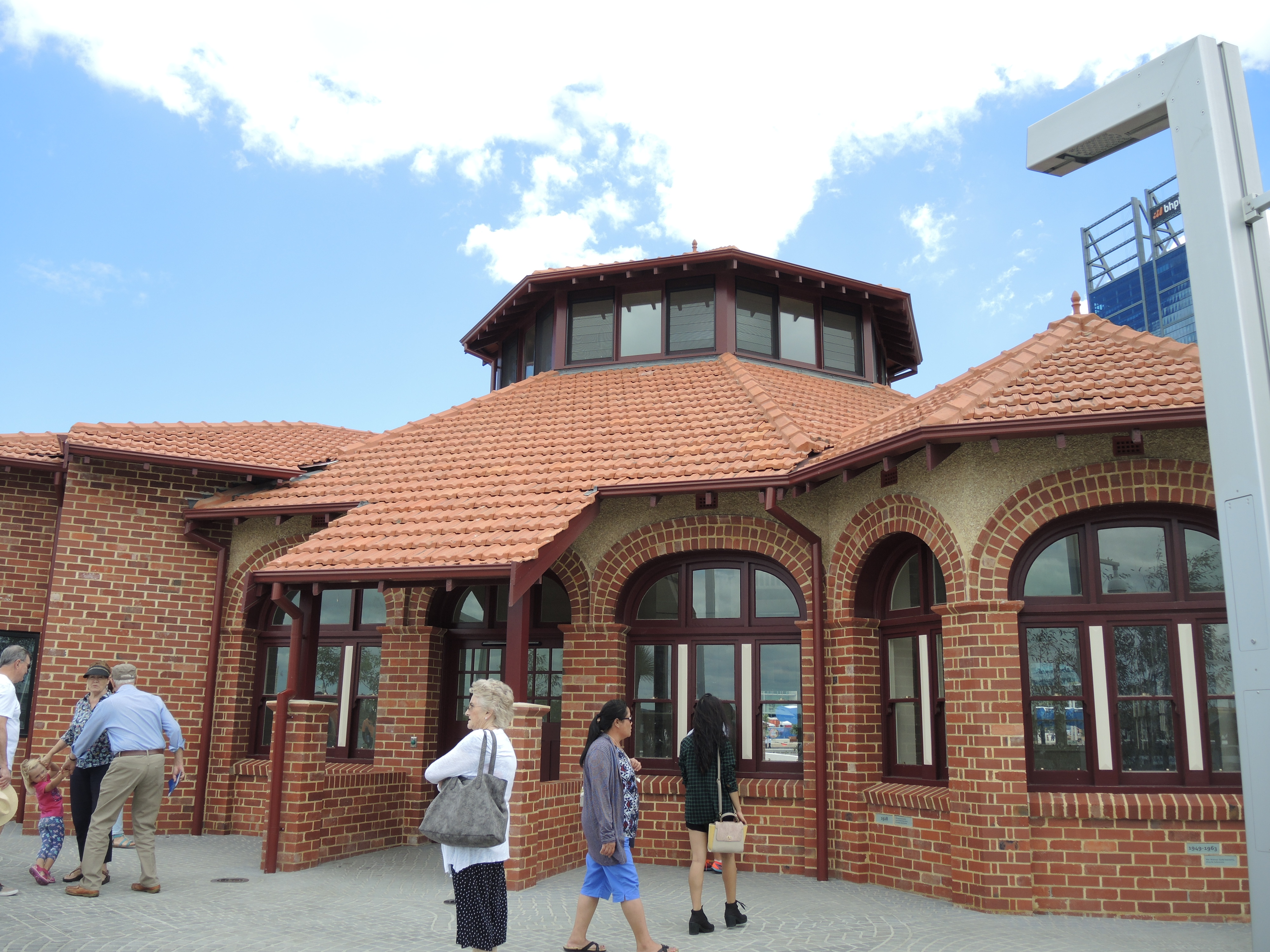
- The Kiosk at Elizabeth Quay in 2016
- Former names: Esplanade Kiosk, Esplanade Tearooms, Annabella's Nightclub, The Converted Duke, Florence Hummerston Day Care Centre

General information
- Status: Constructed
- Architectural style: Federation Arts and Crafts
- Location: Elizabeth Quay, Perth, Australia
- Coordinates: 31°57′33″S 115°51′24″E
- Current tenants: The Island
- Opened: December 1928; 97 years ago
- Relocated: 2013–2015; 11 years ago
- Cost: A£ 5,991 (~ A$545,027 in 2022)
- Renovation cost: A$16M
- Owner: Metropolitan Redevelopment Authority

Design and construction
- Architect: Louis Cumpston

Western Australia Heritage Register
- Official name: Esplanade Reserve
- Type: State Registered Place
- Designated: 17 October 2003
- Reference no.: 3850

The Florence Hummerston Kiosk is a building located at Elizabeth Quay in Perth, Western Australia. The kiosk was originally located on the Perth Esplanade, until being relocated to an islet at Elizabeth Quay. Originally constructed in 1928 as a tearoom, the kiosk was also known as the Esplanade Kiosk in addition to other names and has hosted various tenants. In 1985 it was renamed after former City of Perth councillor Florence Hummerston.

== History ==
=== Construction ===
The kiosk was originally built on reclaimed land on the northern side of the Esplanade Reserve and replaced a grandstand that had been built in 1885. It was designed by Louis Bowser Cumpston in what was described by its heritage assessment as "a fine example of the Federation Arts and Crafts style, composed of interlocking octagonal forms with elliptical arched windows". The building was constructed as a tearoom and changing room for the adjoining sporting facilities.

The building was approved in mid-1928 and construction was completed for a December 1928 opening. It was built for a cost of £A 5,991, equivalent to A$545,027 in 2022.

=== Later uses ===
The building has been altered at times by the Perth City Council and has hosted various tenants. Over time it has also been known as the Esplanade Kiosk, the Esplanade Tearooms for most of the 1940s and 1950s, the Silver Dragon Restaurant and Steak House (late 1960s), Annabella's Nightclub (1977–1980), the Salvation Army youth drop-in centre The Converted Duke (1982–1985), as well as the Florence Hummerston Day Care Centre (1985–1998). Before its relocation to Elizabeth Quay, the kiosk was then-occupied by the upscale Grand Palace Chinese restaurant.

With the redevelopment of Esplanade Reserve in the early 1970s, the change rooms and public toilets were redesigned internally.

=== Relocation ===
Plans for the 2012 redevelopment of the Esplanade area included dismantling the original building and moving it elsewhere. The newer additions to the building (with lesser heritage values) would be demolished. The kiosk was deconstructed in 2012 to make way for the excavation of the Elizabeth Quay site and was placed into storage.

In November 2012, the Government of Western Australia confirmed the kiosk would be reconstructed on an island at the Elizabeth Quay project. In March 2015 the government stated the relocation had cost A$11 million. The cost included a A$7 million compensation payout to the operator of the Grand Palace Chinese restaurant who had a 44-year lease on the building. In June 2017, the government confirmed the final total cost for the relocation was A$16 million after it was revealed the compensation payout was much higher than originally stated.

Elizabeth Quay was officially opened on 29 January 2016, with the kiosk reopening on 2 September 2016. As of May 2023, the kiosk houses a hospitality complex known as The Island at Elizabeth Quay, which includes a microbrewery, restaurant, kiosk, brew garden, outdoor music stage, pizzeria, and a playground for children.
