= Florence Hummerston =

Australian politician (1889–1983)

Florence Hummerston OBE, JP
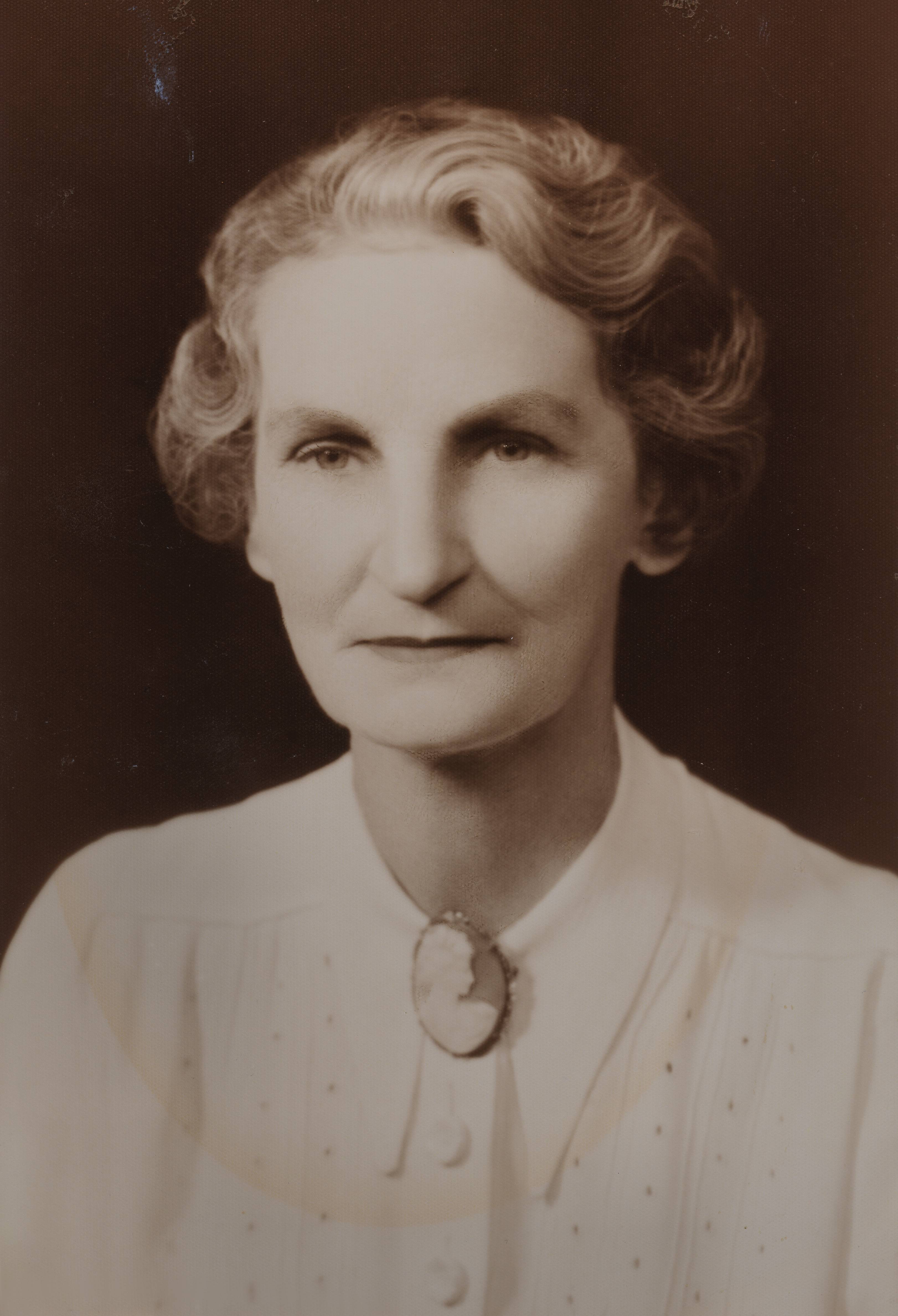
- Hummerston c. 1950

City of Perth Councillor
- In office 1951–1969

Personal details
- Born: Florence Ellen Hayman; 6 March 1889 Fremantle, Western Australia
- Died: 31 December 1983 (aged 94) Como, Western Australia
- Resting place: Karrakatta Cemetery
- Party: Liberal and Country League
- Spouse: Victor Hummerston (m. 1909; died 1973)
- Children: 1

Florence Ellen Hummerston OBE JP, née Hayman, (6 March 1889 – 31 December 1983) was an Australian politician. She was a City of Perth councillor between 1951 and 1969.

== Biography ==
=== Early life ===
Hummerston was born on 6 March 1889 in Fremantle, Western Australia. Her father was George Hayman and her mother, Emily Hayman. She was educated at St Joseph's school and Underwood Business College.

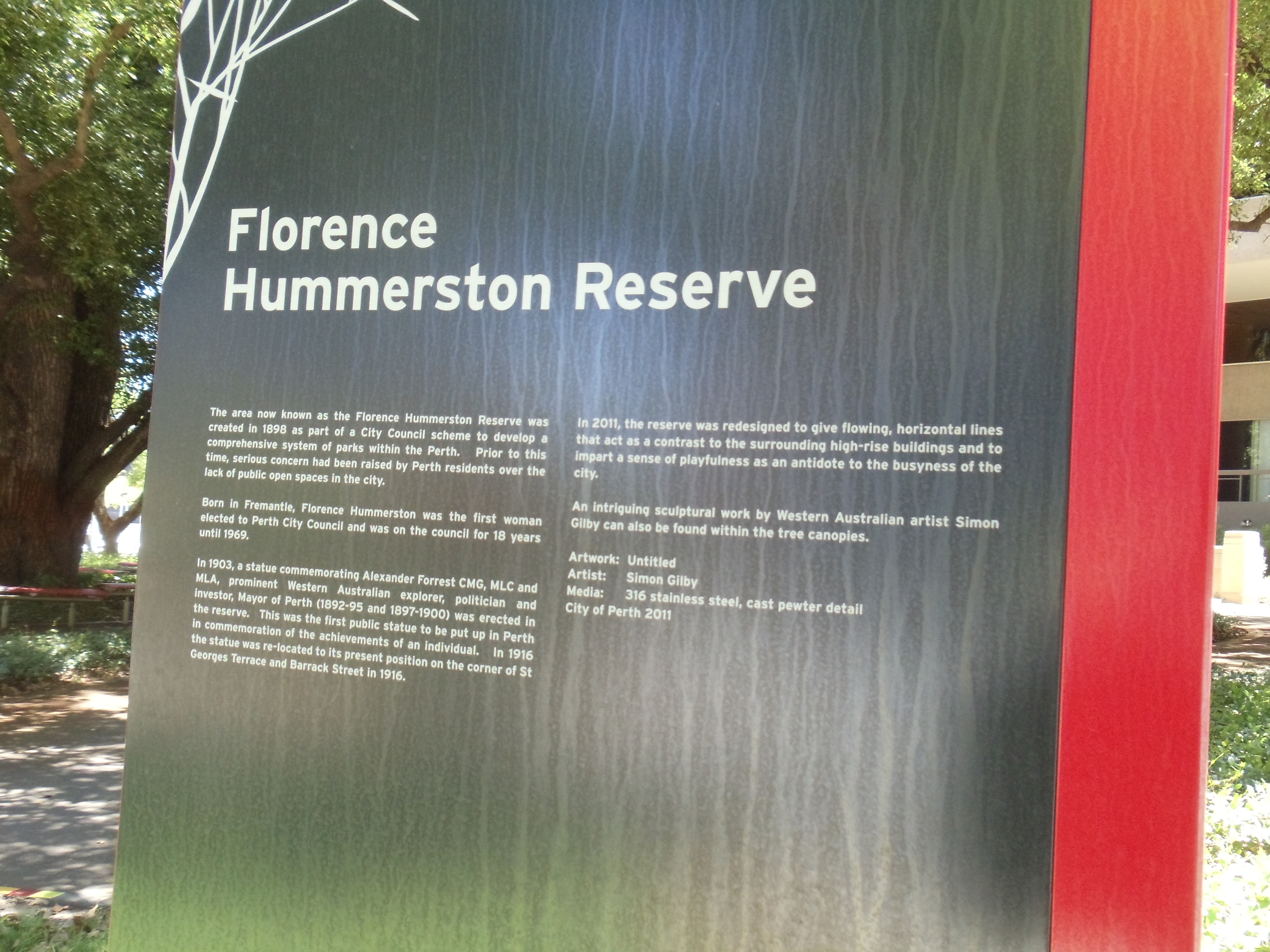
Florence Hummerston Reserve sign in Perth, Western Australia

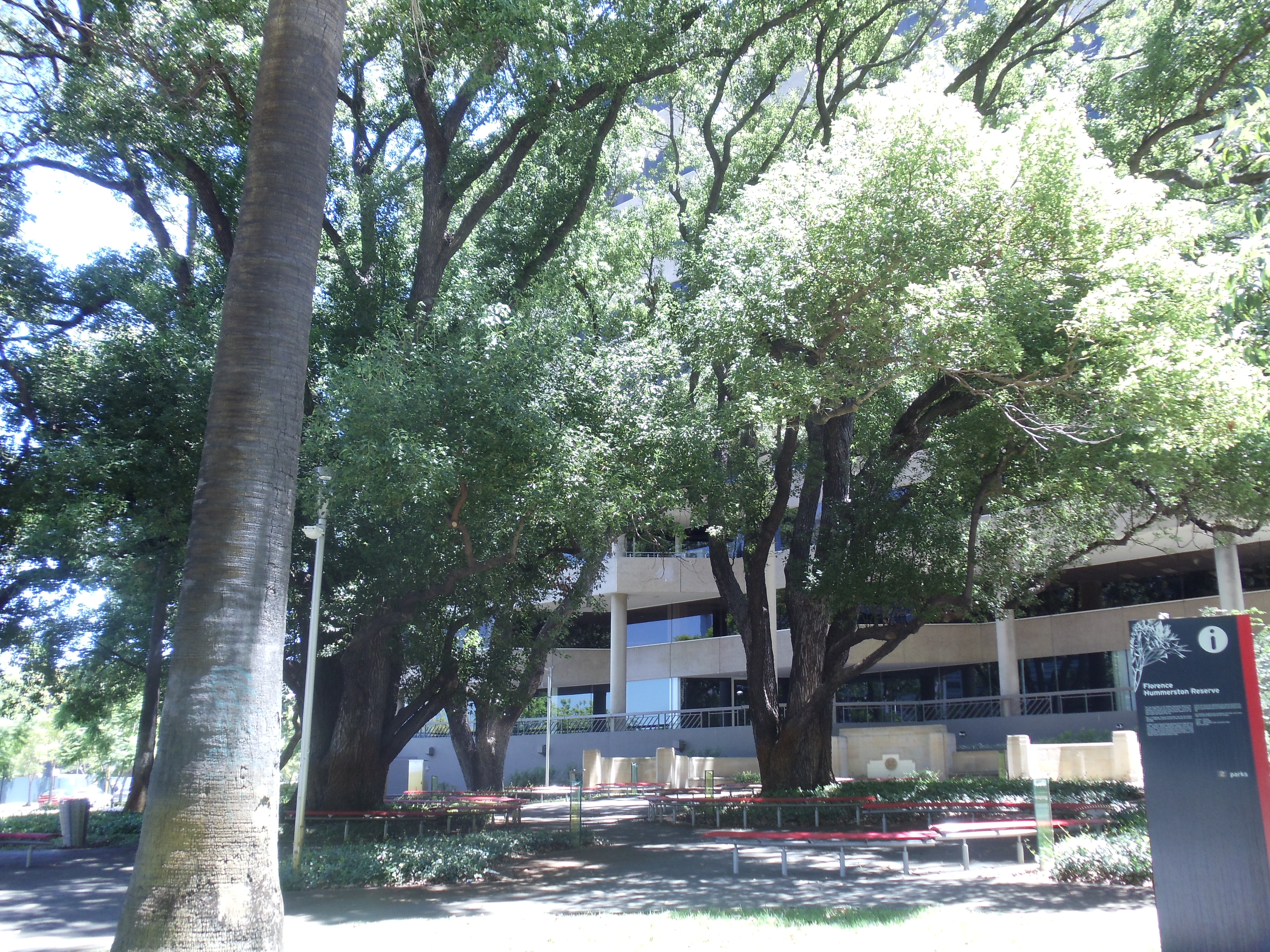
Florence Hummerston Reserve in Perth, Western Australia

=== Early career ===
After leaving school, she was employed in her father's business as a secretary and typist. After marrying Victor Hummerston, she soon focussed on raising her daughter. After Victor returned from serving in World War I, she managed a billiards hall, later operating a shop with her husband.

=== Public life ===
From the late 1910s, she became involved in charitable and philanthropic endeavours. She was involved in the Women's Service Guilds of Western Australia, serving as vice president between 1937 and 1941. She was Western Australian Commander of the Women's Australian National Service (WANS) and was involved with the establishment of the state branch of the Australian Women's Land Army. In 1943, as part of WANS, she helped set up the Wanslea Hostel. In 1954 she opened Meals on Wheels in Western Australia.

=== Political career ===
She was elected as a City of Perth councillor for the South Ward in 1951, becoming the first female councillor.

She was an unsuccessful Liberal and Country League candidate for the Western Australian Legislative Assembly seat of North Perth in 1953.

=== Honours ===
In 1960, she became an Officer of the Order of the British Empire (OBE) for services to social welfare.

The Florence Hummerston Kiosk in Perth is named for her, and housed the Florence Hummerston Day Care Centre between 1985 and 1998.

A pocket park on the corner of St Georges Terrace and Mount Street is named in her honour.

=== Personal life and death ===
She married Victor Hummerston in 1909 at St Patrick's Church in Fremantle. They had a daughter Emily (born 1910) who died at the age of 18 from kidney failure. She was widowed in 1973 when Victor died. She lived until 1983 when she died at Como aged 94. She was buried at Karrakatta Cemetery.
