= Esplanade Reserve =

Former park in Perth, Western Australia

Coordinates: 31°57′26″S 115°51′26″E

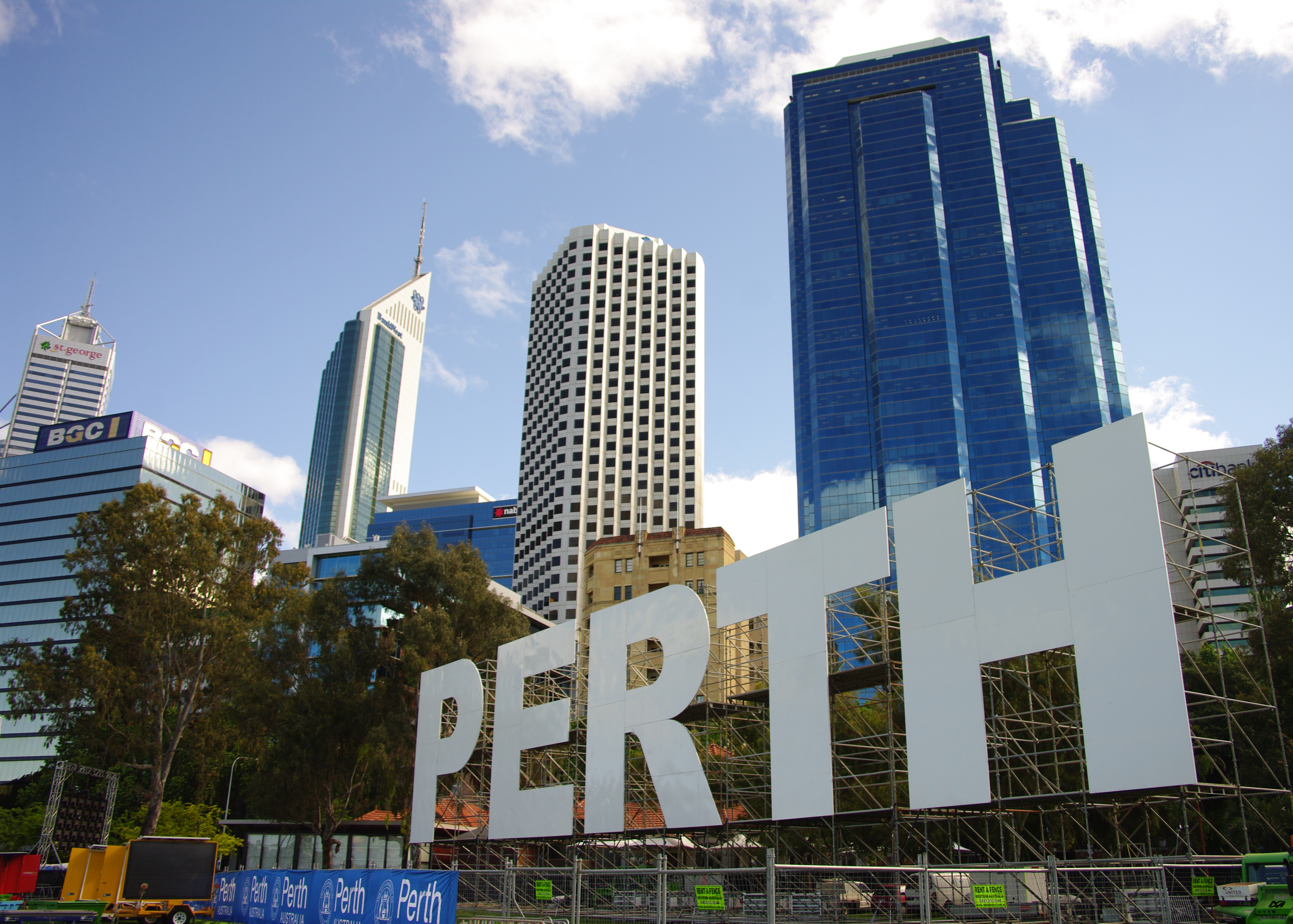
Signage on the Esplanade during the Commonwealth Heads of Government Meeting 2011

The Esplanade Reserve was a heritage listed public space located between Perth Water and the central business district of Perth, Western Australia. Established in 1880 on reclaimed land between the William Street and Barrack Street jetties, it served as a prominent recreational area for the city's residents. In April 2012, the Western Australian state government resumed the reserve as part of the Elizabeth Quay redevelopment of the Perth waterfront area. Adjacent hotels, railway stations and other features have used the term Esplanade to show their link to the space. (Note: The Esplanade Hotel, The New Esplanade, and (until January 2016) Esplanade railway station and the Esplanade Busport.) The road along the northern boundary of that space is still, as of May 2022, called The Esplanade.

== History ==
The northern edge of Perth Water, stretching from Mount Eliza in Kings Park to The Causeway, underwent significant modifications through land reclamation along the original pre-European shoreline. Many projects and constructions on the Esplanade area and adjacent areas have significantly reflected the changing identity of Perth.

The Esplanade was developed in the 1870s to provide a site of active recreation for the inhabitants of the city. The idea of a site closer to the administrative and residential heart of the city had been a matter of concern since at least 1864, when a fund for the establishment of a new recreation ground was established. A recreation ground, now Wellington Square, was included in the original town plan, but was considered too far for most people to walk to and was largely undeveloped. Around 1867–1868 stones were placed in the river to mark out the edge of the reclamation, but little other work was undertaken until 1870. Between 1870 and 1878 reclamation was undertaken using mud dredged up from the river bottom (dredging was used to provide crushed oyster shell for marking out roads and pathways) and street sweepings.

It was handed to the City of Perth in 1880 as a Deed of Grant in Trust. Since its handover to the City of Perth, it was the site of many celebrations, protests and national commemorations.

The first major event held on the Esplanade was the 1881 Intercolonial Exhibition, organised by Richard Twopenny and Jules Joubert. Joubert, who spent several months in the city to develop and oversee the exhibition, recommended a city baths, and in 1885 the first Perth City Baths were established at the end of the Esplanade Reserve.

The Perth Bowling Club green was established directly across from the Esplanade Hotel in 1895, and the green and players appear regularly in the images created to promote the hotel in later years.

At various stages in its history, the Esplanade was a suggested site of various ideas, even a new town hall.

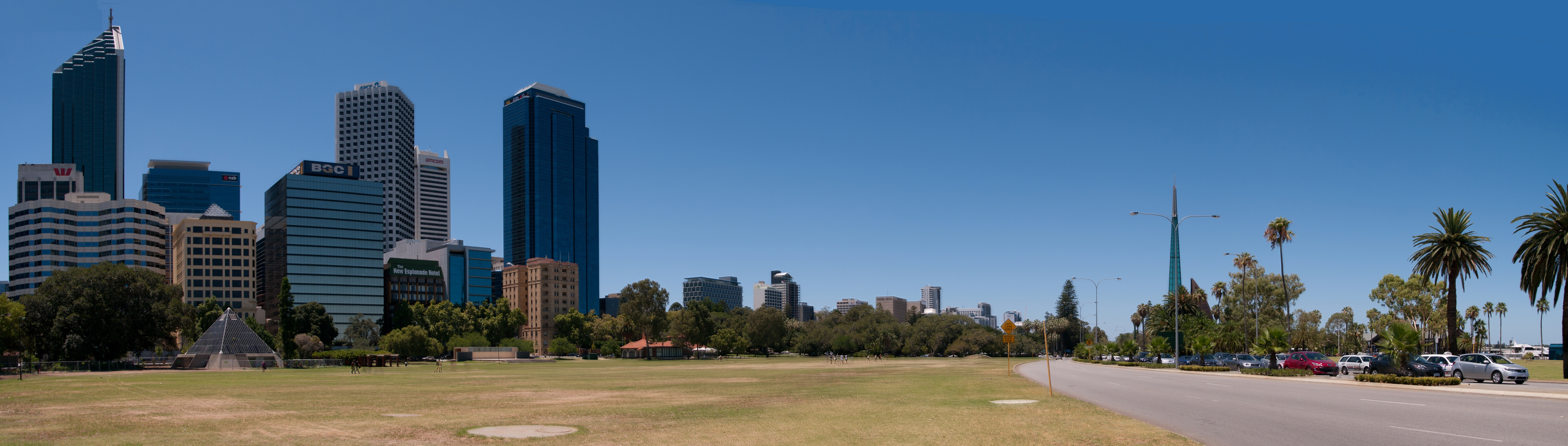
Looking east across The Esplanade in February 2012

== Adjoining features ==
=== Historical features ===
- Perth City Baths
- Perth and Tattersalls Bowling and Recreation Club
- Croquet Cub
- Bazaar Terrace
- 1881 Intercolonial Exhibition

=== Extant features ===
- Barrack Square
- The Esplanade Kiosk
- Alf Curlewis Gardens
- Allan Green Conservatory
