= LandCorp =

Agency overview
- Formed: 1 September 1992
- Preceding agencies: Industrial Lands Development Authority; Joondalup Development Corporation
- Dissolved: 2019
- Superseding agency: DevelopmentWA
- Jurisdiction: Western Australia
- Headquarters: Perth
- Minister responsible: Minister for Lands
- Agency executives: Darren Cooper, Chairman; Dean Mudford, Chief Executive Officer
- Key document: Western Australian Land Authority Act 1992
- Website: www.landcorp.com.au

LandCorp was an agency of the Government of Western Australia. It was responsible for releasing land for residential and commercial development throughout Western Australia.

LandCorp was established on 1 September 1992, pursuant to the Western Australian Land Authority Act 1992 when the Industrial Lands Development Authority and Joondalup Development Corporation merged. In 2019 it merged with the Metropolitan Redevelopment Authority to form DevelopmentWA.
