= Elizabeth Quay =

Waterfront precinct in Perth, Western Australia

Coordinates: 31°57′27″S 115°51′25″E

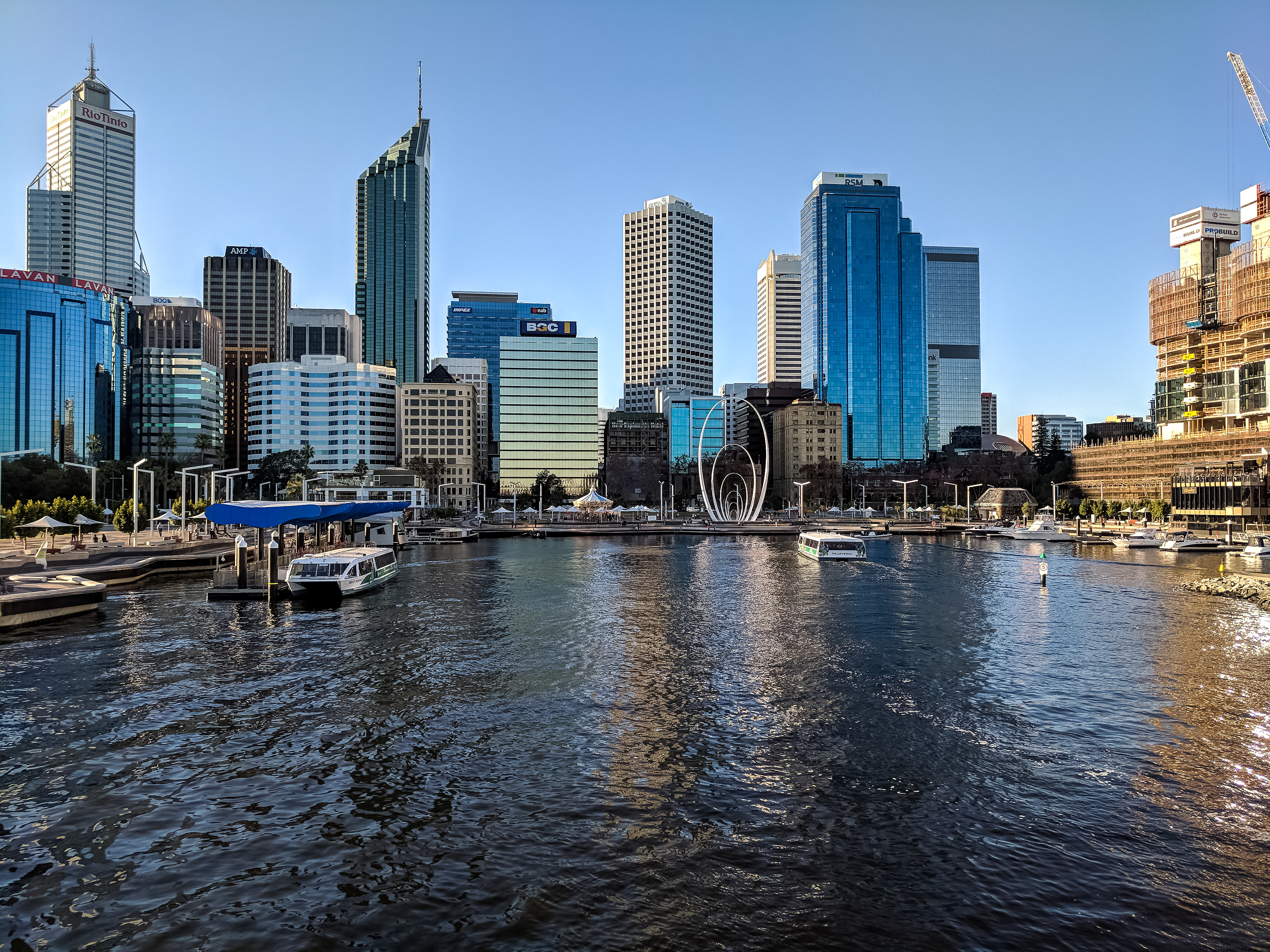
Elizabeth Quay inlet with the Perth CBD in the background

Elizabeth Quay (often abbreviated as EQ) is a mixed-use waterfront precinct in the Perth central business district. Encompassing an area on the north shore of Perth Water near the landmark Swan Bells, the development was named in honour of Queen Elizabeth II during her Diamond Jubilee.

The project includes construction of an artificial inlet on what was previously the Esplanade Reserve, and modifications to the surrounding environs including Barrack Square, with the project opening nine sites for potential development. Completed facilities were initially projected to include 1,700 residential apartments, 150,000 square metres (1.6 million square feet) of office space and 39,000 square metres (0.42 million square feet) of retail space.

Time-lapse of the ferries at Elizabeth Quay, March 2026

Planning Minister John Day and Premier Colin Barnett turned the first ground at the Esplanade Reserve on 26 April 2012, and Barnett announced the name Elizabeth Quay on 28 May 2012. Construction of the inlet and associated infrastructure were completed in January 2016, ahead of the Perth International Arts Festival and Fringe World. The quay was officially opened on 29 January 2016. Construction of the associated buildings will be completed at varying times thereafter, with the first – The Towers at Elizabeth Quay – opening on 15 November 2019.

== Description ==
The Elizabeth Quay precinct is centred around an artificial inlet that opens to the Swan River at its south. At the eastern side of the mouth of the inlet is an islet, which contains the Florence Hummerston Kiosk (which hosts a hospitality complex), the Bessie Rischbieth statue and a playground, and is connected to the eastern shore by a short bridge and to the western shore by the longer Elizabeth Quay Bridge, a pedestrian and cycling bridge which spans the mouth of the inlet.

On the eastern shore are 24 public short stay moorings for recreational boats, as well as the Meet Our Australian Sailor sculpture on the south-eastern shore near the islet. The eastern side contains The Towers at Elizabeth Quay, a development consisting of a 28-storey Ritz Carlton Hotel and an adjacent residential tower, as well as two smaller buildings containing food and beverage outlets. The north shore, designated the Landing, features the sculpture Spanda at its centre, with a carousel immediately west of the public artwork. Directly north of the Landing, across Geoffrey Bolton Avenue which bisects the area from west to east, is the 19-storey Nine The Esplanade office tower development, with the 29-storey One The Esplanade tower containing the Australian headquarters of Chevron Corporation located in the north-east of the precinct. To the north-west, adjacent to the Nine The Esplanade development, is an empty lot yet to be developed as of January 2026; this lot has been slated for the future 56-storey Fifteen The Esplanade mixed-use development.

The western shore features the Elizabeth Quay Jetty for Transperth ferry services to South Perth as well as commercial moorings. To the north-west is a shaded water park and play area and a building containing public toilets and a food and beverage outlet, with the mixed-use EQ West development consisting of two towers (52-storeys and 25-storeys, under construction as of January 2026) taking up the rest of the precinct to its west and south-west. The art piece First Contact stands on the south-west shore, near the western entry to the Elizabeth Quay Bridge.

== Announcement and construction ==
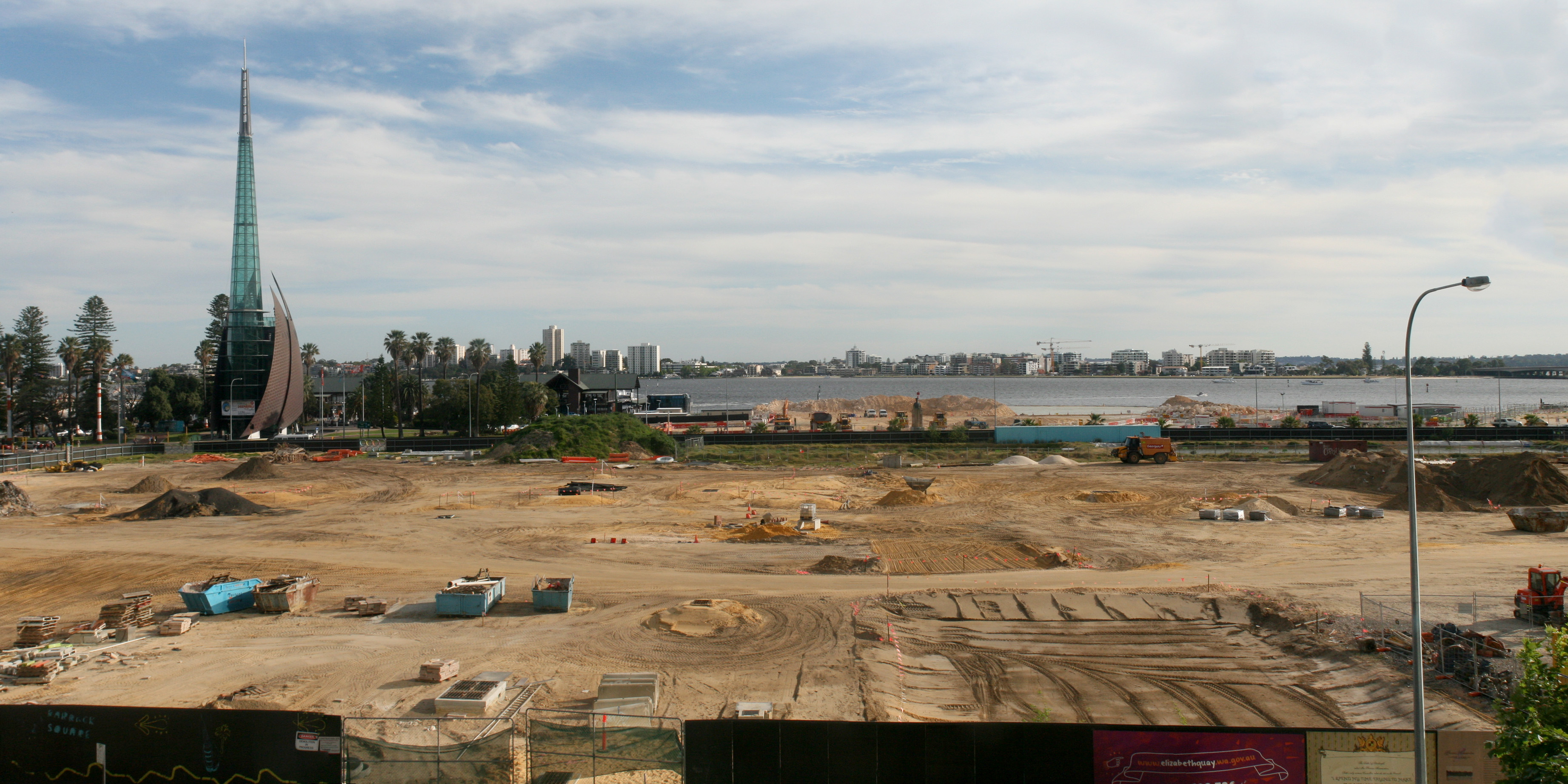
Construction works in November 2013

In February 2011, Premier Colin Barnett and Perth Lord Mayor Lisa Scaffidi confirmed plans for the project and funding which included A$270 million, equivalent to A$346.22 million in 2022, from the 2011/12 state budget. The total government outlay would be A$440 million with A$134 million recovered from property sales to developers.

The project created significant changes to adjacent features such as Riverside Drive, Barrack Square and environs. Other nearby sites such as Supreme Court Gardens and Langley Park were affected through changes in use or additional use. Nearby heritage listed Lawson Apartments and the Weld Club were affected due to pile driving and obstruction of views.

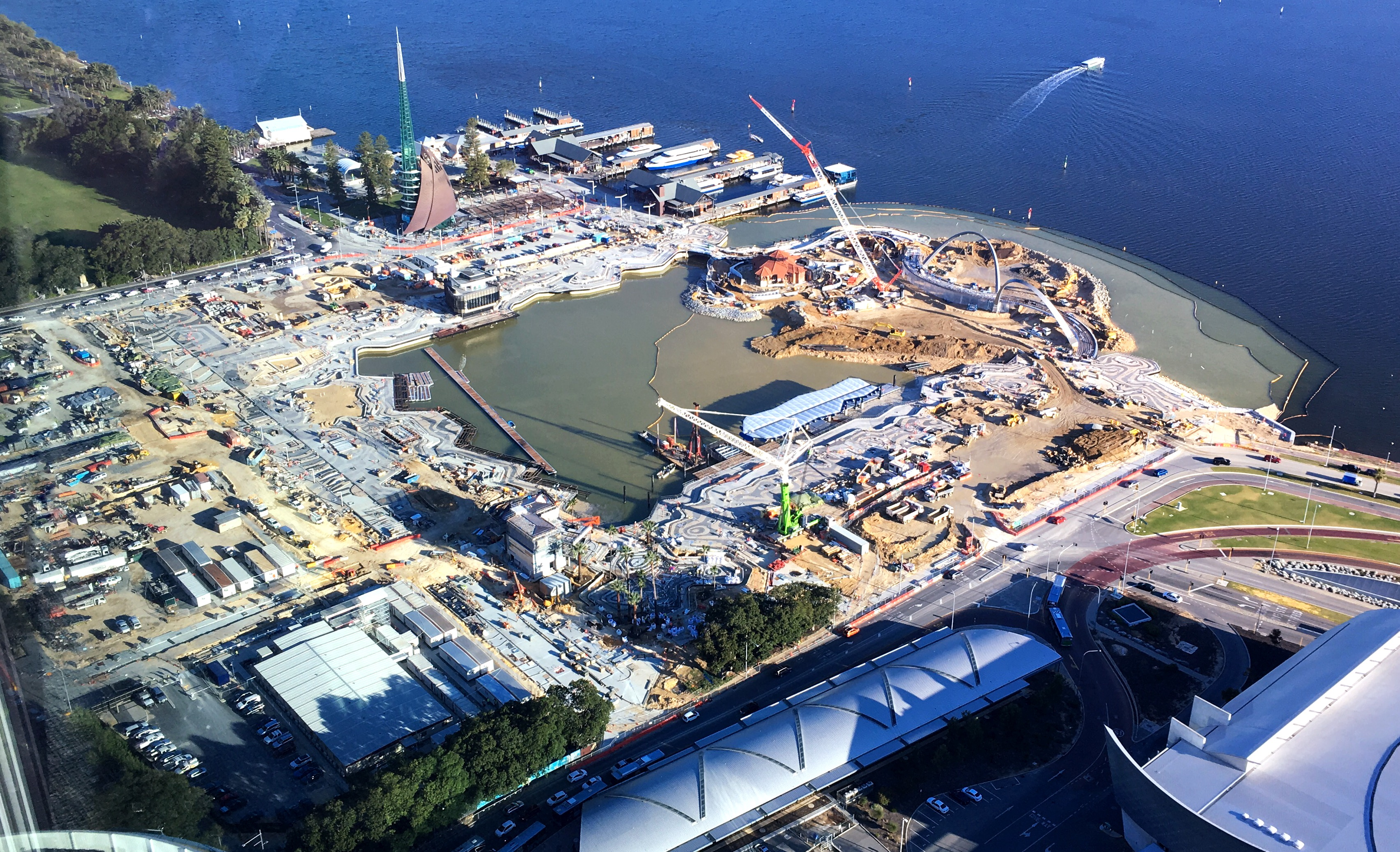
Construction works in October 2015

The JJ Talbot Hobbs memorial, a feature of Anzac Day ceremonies for over sixty years, was relocated to the entrance of the Supreme Court Gardens. The Esplanade Kiosk, built in 1927 in the Federation Arts and Crafts style, was dismantled and rebuilt, brick by brick, as a kiosk on the island feature in the new inlet.

While some of the trees in the reserve and surrounding areas were retained, the Moreton Bay figs along Barrack Street were removed and replaced with London planes.

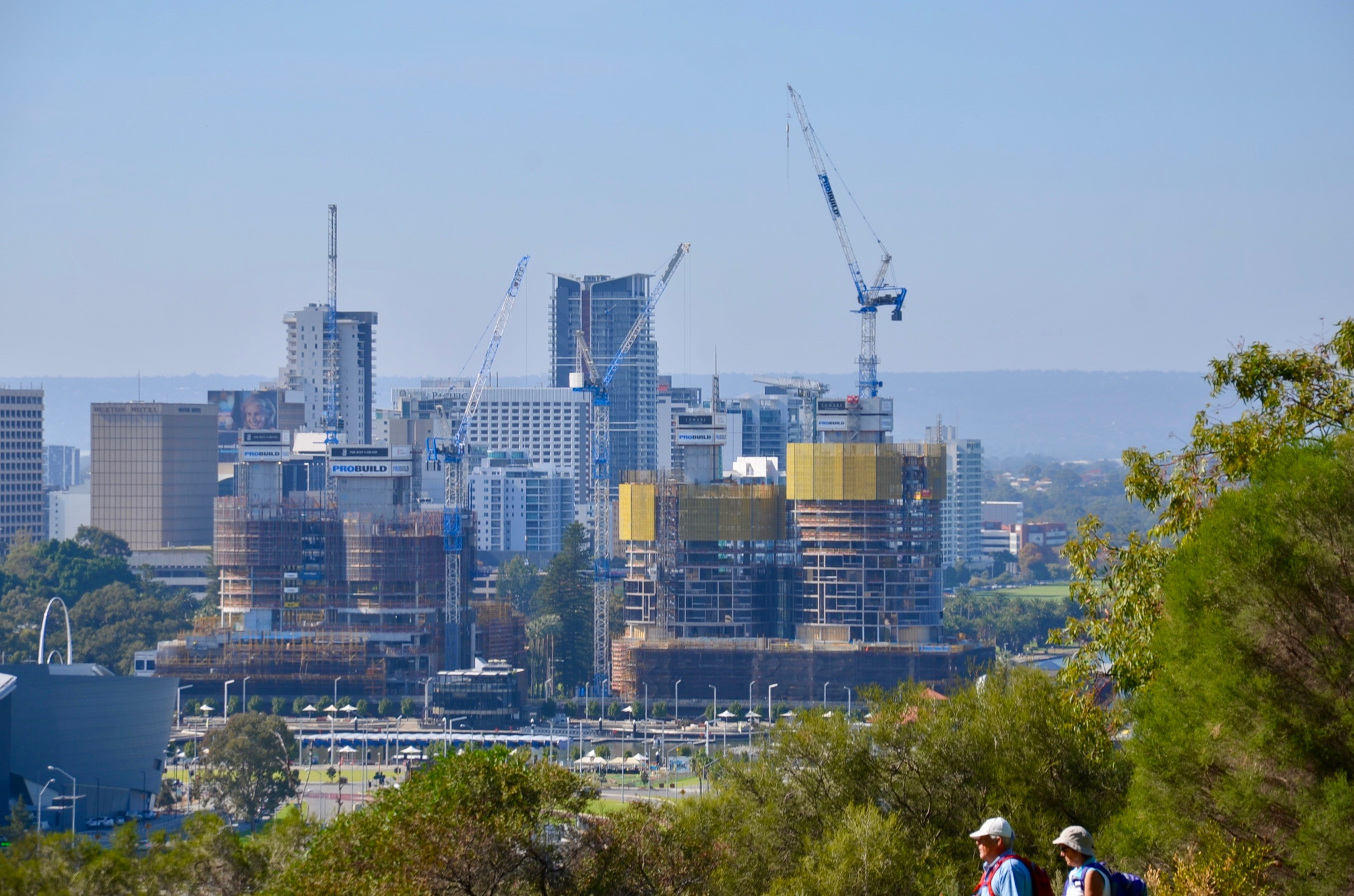
Construction works of buildings on east side of Elizabeth Quay, in May 2018

The state government identified project returns in the order of A$1.7 million on the sale of real estate sites to commercial developers, with the whole development projected as a A$2.6 billion investment opportunity. There was debate on the speculative nature of the estimates.

The Metropolitan Redevelopment Authority (MRA) launched a publicity campaign for the development, with the slogan "The river. The city. Together again." and also had a range of panels on screens surrounding the development site repeating anecdotes about the former esplanade area, as well as text of the material found on the website, and other public relations material.

On 21 April 2012, the MRA released new design guidelines for the development and called for submissions on a second amendment to the Metropolitan Region Scheme. The Minister for Planning granted approval for public comment on the redevelopment scheme and amendments, and the Metropolitan Redevelopment Board approved the Draft Perth Waterfront Design Guidelines. MRA chairman Eric Lumsden made comment on the MRA role in the process.

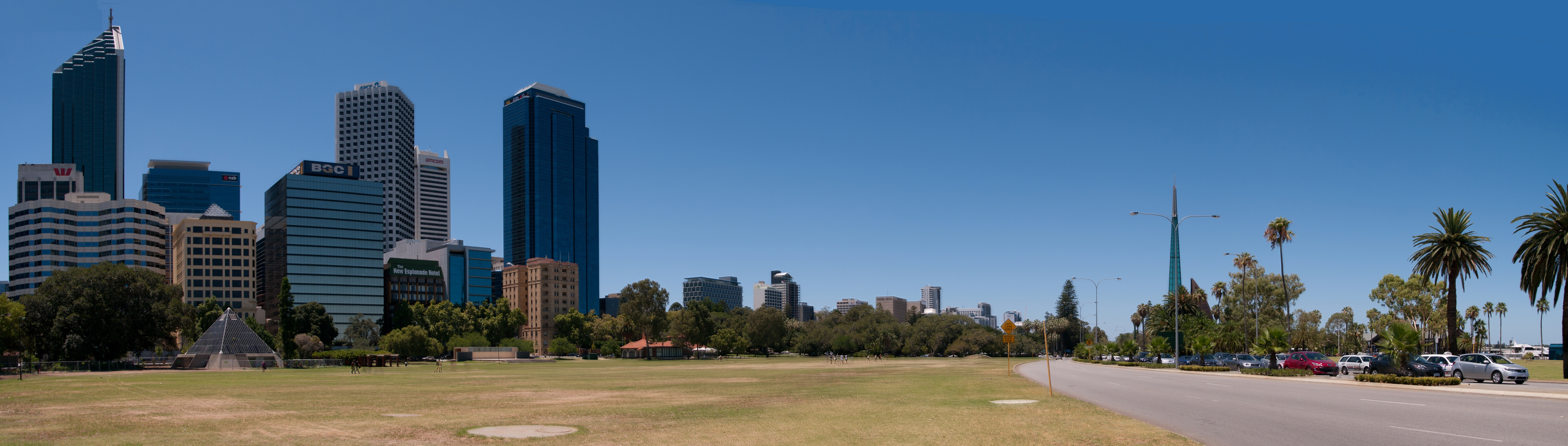
Looking east across the Esplanade Reserve in February 2012 prior to construction commencement

=== Contractors ===
ARM Architecture were the architects on the development. Urban planner Richard Weller was a lead consultant. Weller commented about the development as an experiment on bringing in new high rise development in the CBD.

The Perth firm Hocking Heritage Studio has identified its involvement with the project.

Leighton Contractors and its parent CIMIC Group, were awarded the principal construction contract in December 2012. Construction included a new inlet, associated roads, parks, promenades, and an island with connecting bridge within a 10 hectares (25 acres) parcel of land. The contract value was $210 million as at 31 December 2012.

== Opposition campaigns ==
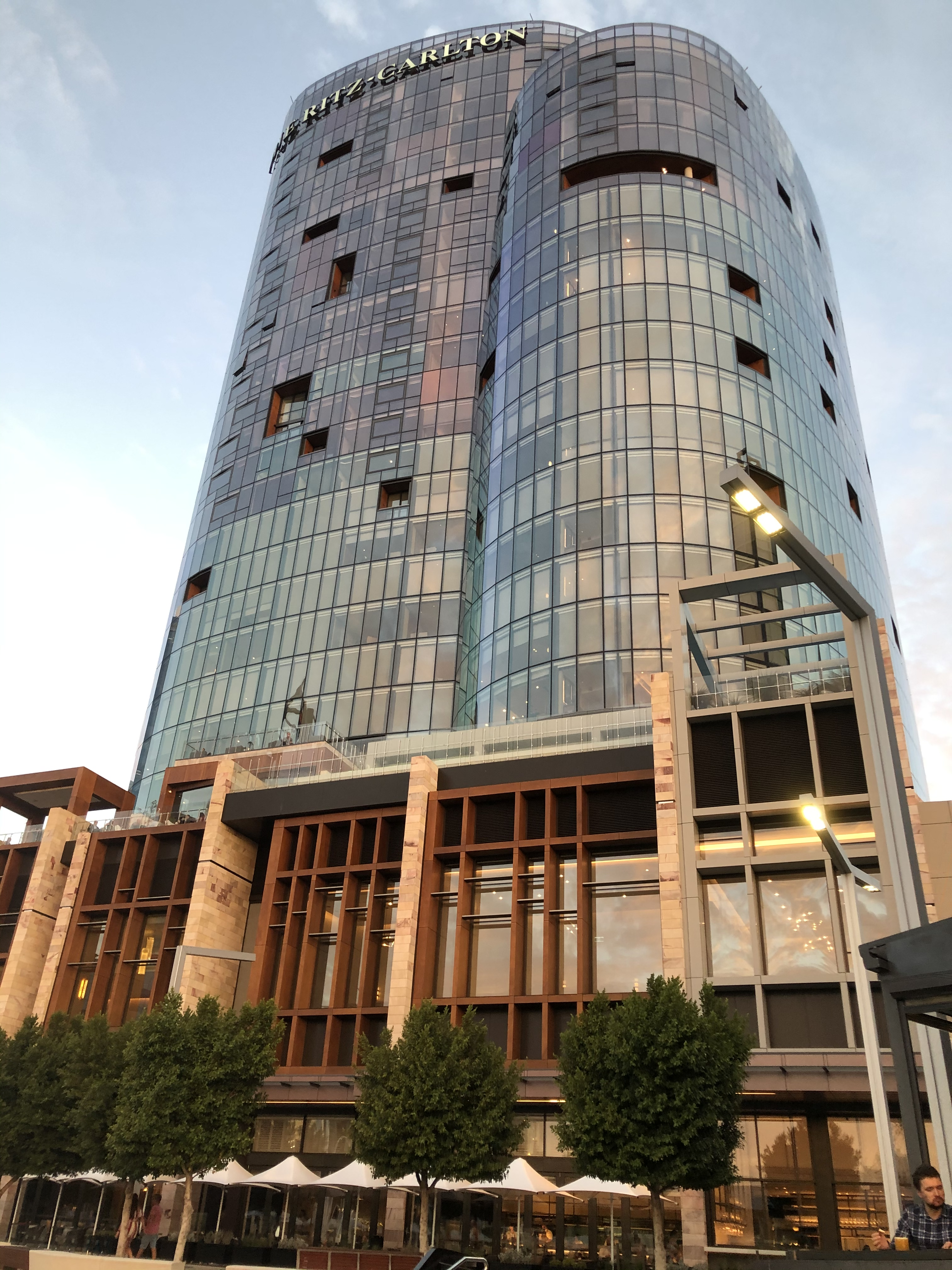
Ritz-Carlton hotel

Following the announcement, the proposals created extensive public debate and opposition due to its supposed failure to sustain respect for heritage, and potential risks to the ecology of the river.

At a "Foreshore Forum" in 2011, organised by the History Council of Western Australia, speakers examined the history and heritage of the site, and expressed concerns about the way in which the heritage aspects of the site were to be interpreted. Speakers suggested that a thorough archaeological examination of the site for European artefacts associated with the early commercial maritime activities and later recreational bathing activities on the site should be included as part of any digging for the proposed inlet. Subsequent discoveries during the excavation process have included a set of timber poles and timber "steps", consistent with pier construction of the 19th century and the formwork for the Barrack Square retaining wall.

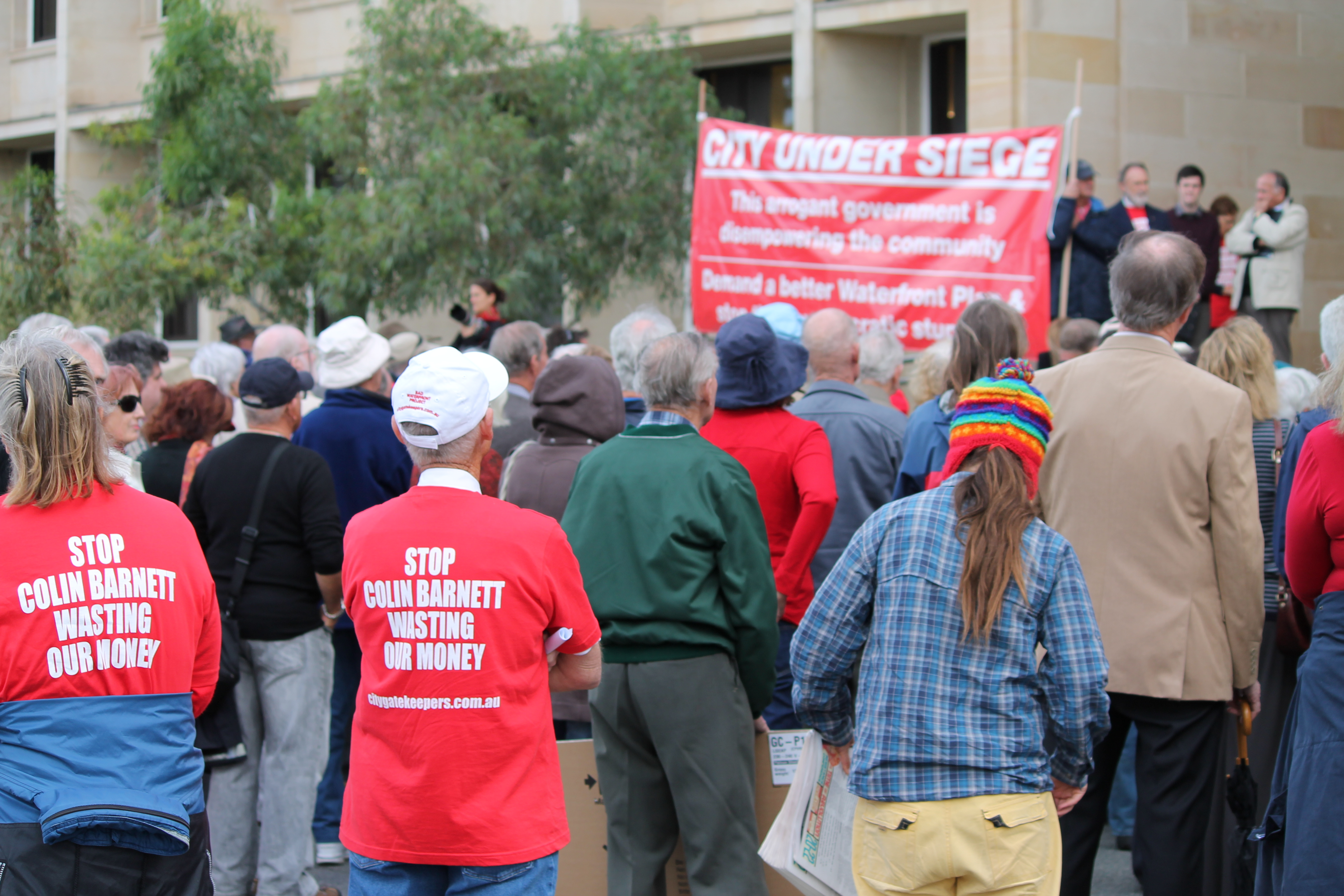
A protest against the waterfront plan outside Parliament House on 13 June 2012

Concerns were raised about the impact on the Perth road network resulting from the diversion of Riverside Drive traffic around the new inlet.

As part of the proposed works the Graham Farmer Freeway had additional lanes installed in the Northbridge Tunnel to encourage motorists to bypass the city. The Royal Automobile Club raised early concerns that loss of the emergency lanes might affect emergency response times. Although a tunnel, either under the inlet, or as part of one of the suggested alternative schemes, has previously been dismissed, the suggestion that a tunnel might be built at some time in the future has not been totally dismissed.

A lobby group named City Gatekeepers headed by urban planner Linley Lutton was formed to oppose the plans. The group described the plans as being "badly flawed" and forced through without opportunity for public consultation or comment. Between 500 and 2000 people (depending on the source of the crowd estimate) attended a protest rally organised by the group on the Esplanade on 26 February 2012. Kate Doust, MLC, presented two petitions against the development, one with 8667 signatures and a second with 662 signatures, to the Western Australian Legislative Council on 6 March 2012. A third petition, containing 1,117 signatures, was tabled on 29 March 2012. The City Gatekeepers also released a number of alternative concept designs, one of which included a land bridge over Riverside Drive, and all featuring the retention of all or most of the Esplanade, based upon the heritage values of the site.

Similar comments have been made by other planning and design professionals and by the Western Australian Policy Forum.

CityVision also released a number of alternative plans.

Supporters of the project noted that the parcel of land was reclaimed from the Swan River in the 1930s, leading to questions of its heritage value as a decades-old predominantly grassed area and road.

== Issues ==
=== Water quality in water park ===
Less than a month after its opening, the water park was forced to close in February 2016 due to widespread contamination with the bacterium known as Pseudomonas aeruginosa. The approvals for opening the park in January were rushed through with special powers and lack of testing, as reported when the park re-opened in December 2016.

Since 2017, the water park has been operated and maintained by Royal Life Saving WA, which checks water quality daily, and performs a deep clean once a year.

=== Water quality in inlet ===
A proposed triathlon leg to be swum in the inlet was cancelled in March 2016 due to high levels of fecal bacteria. During the 2012 planning Jorg Imberger from the Centre for Water Research at the University of WA commented about the poor flow in front of that section: "...the stretch of the Swan River in front of the city was the worst flushing part of the entire system. ...There was an old timer who came by when we were in the boat and said, 'Jorg, why are they building this thing over there? When I was a kid all the garbage used to collect in that corner'." The inlet was officially excised from the river so is only subject to monthly water testing by a private contractor, in contrast to the government weekly testing of the main river water.

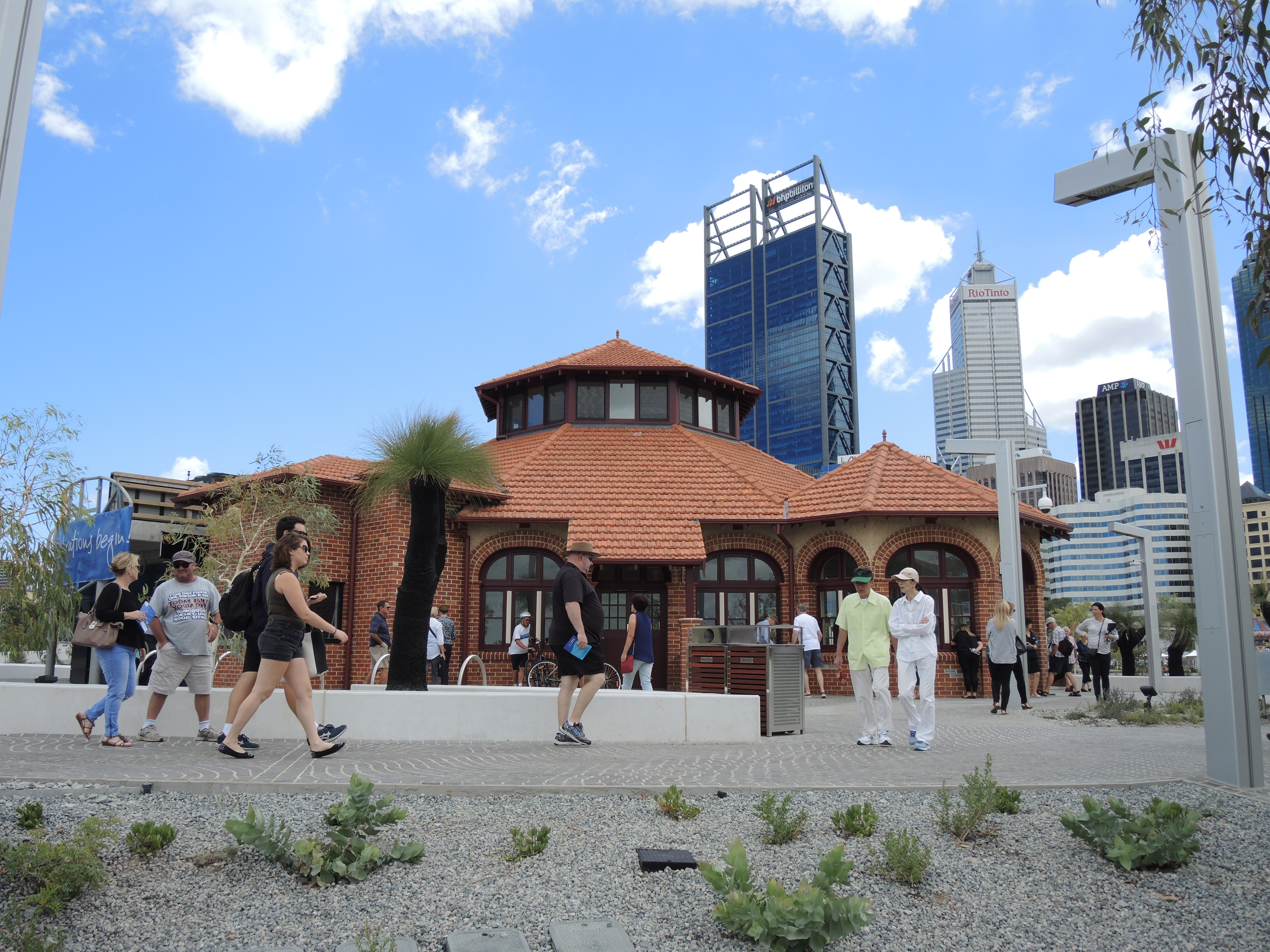
View of the Florence Hummerston Kiosk with the Perth CBD in the background

=== EQ West development ===
The design and placement of the southern tower of the EQ West development in the west of Elizabeth Quay has been criticised by the Bali Memorial Association for disrupting a key design element of the Bali memorial in Kings Park. The memorial, which was built in 2003 and designed so that a shaft of sunlight would fall between two columns and illuminate a plaque with the names of 16 Western Australian victims of the 2002 Bali bombings at sunrise on the anniversary of the bombings on October 12 each year, had this aspect of the memorial disrupted as the 52-storey building gained height and began to block the intended sunlight as it continued construction in 2022.

Concerns have also been raised over the prolonged development of the project, which as of January 2026 has been under construction for more than six years and remains unfinished.

== Transport ==
The Esplanade Busport and Esplanade railway station were renamed as the Elizabeth Quay Bus Station and Elizabeth Quay railway station shortly after the Quay's opening in January 2016.

Transperth runs ferries between Elizabeth Quay Jetty and Mends Street Jetty at South Perth

A cable car to Kings Park was allowed for in the initial plans, but has never gone beyond a concept.

== Public art ==
Several pieces of public art adorn Elizabeth Quay, which include:

- Spanda, a 29-metre-tall (95 ft) abstract sculpture
- First Contact, a 5-metre-tall (16 ft) depiction of a bird in a boat
- A statue of Bessie Rischbieth
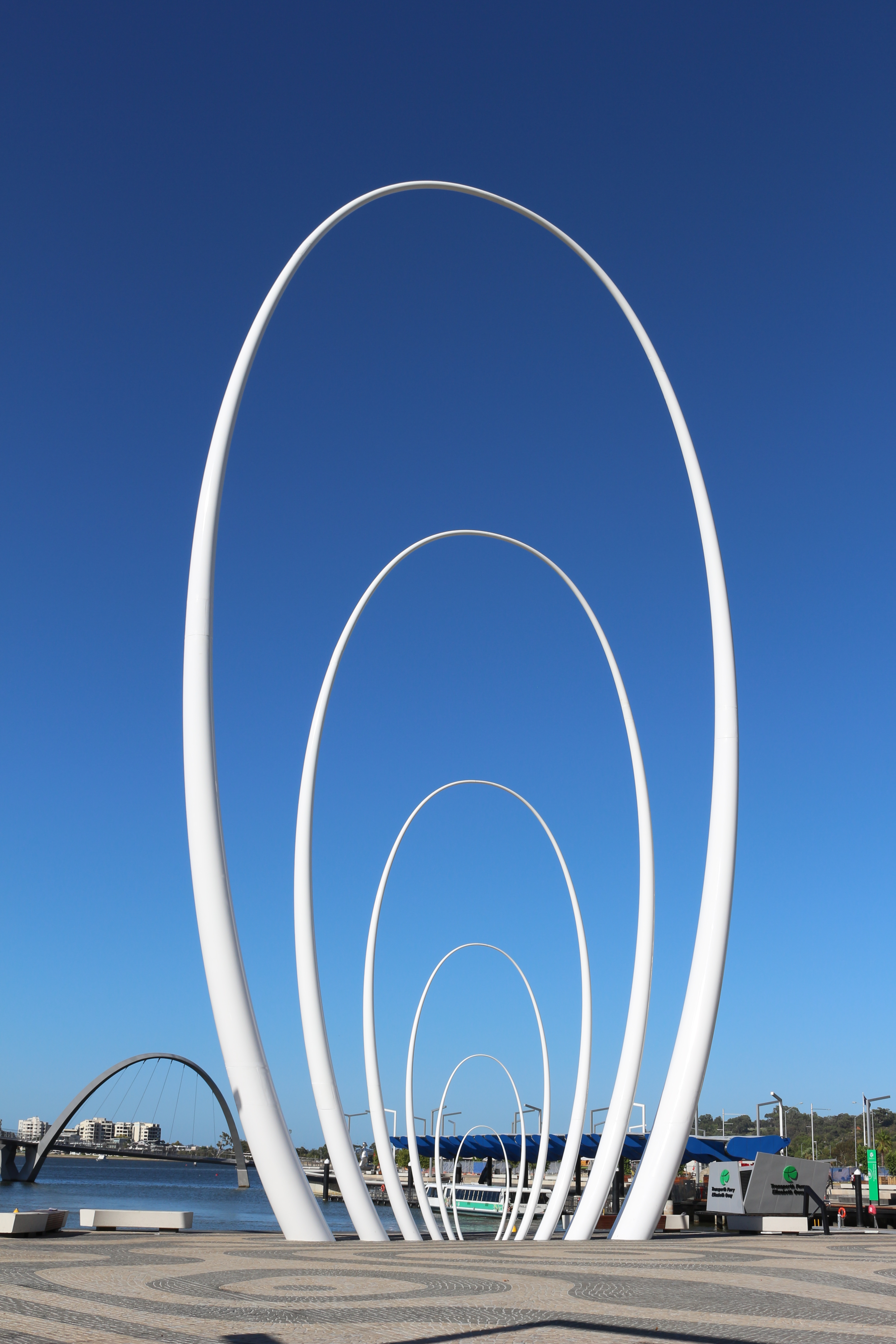
Spanda (viewed from north side of Elizabeth Quay)

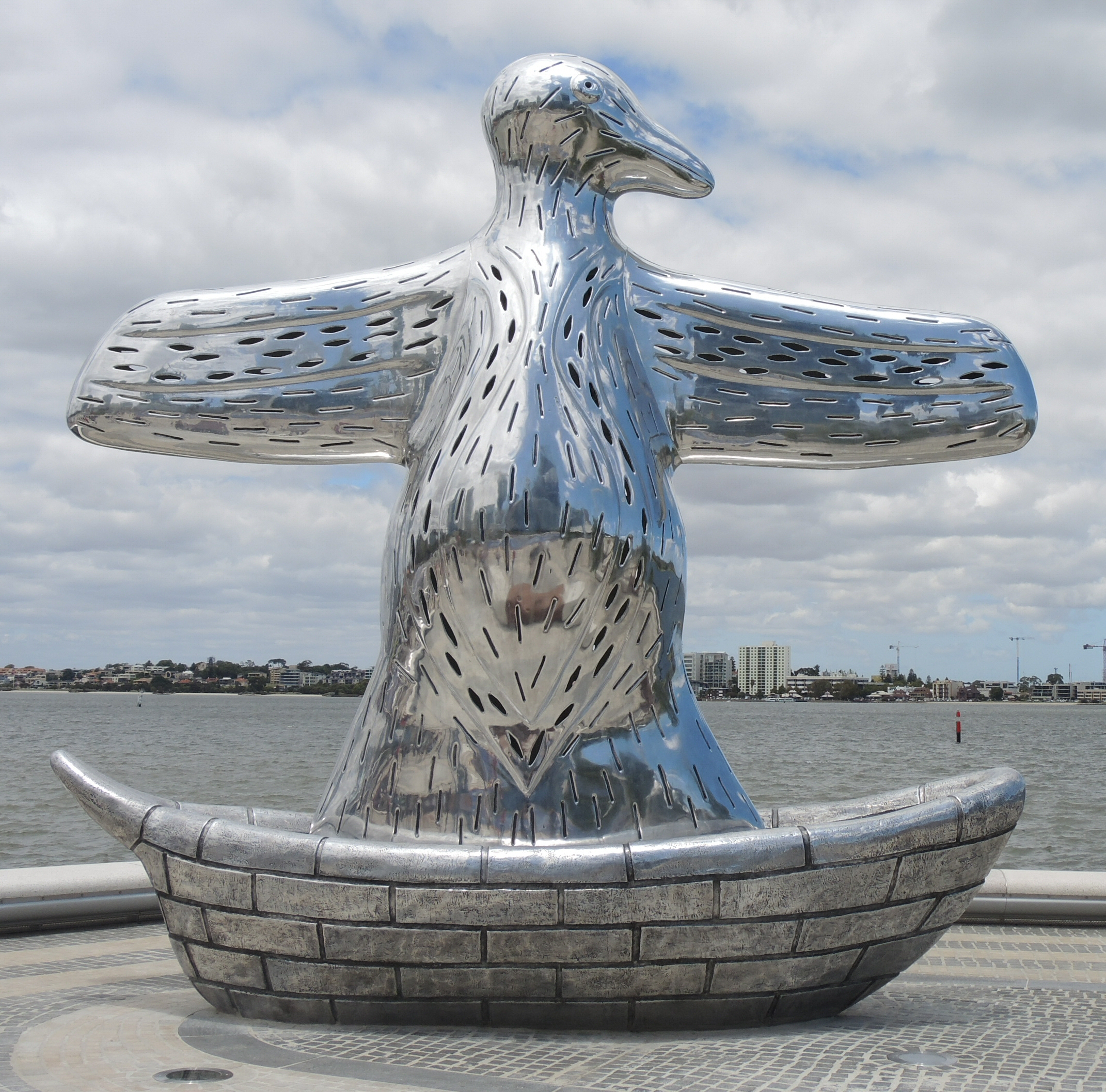
First Contact

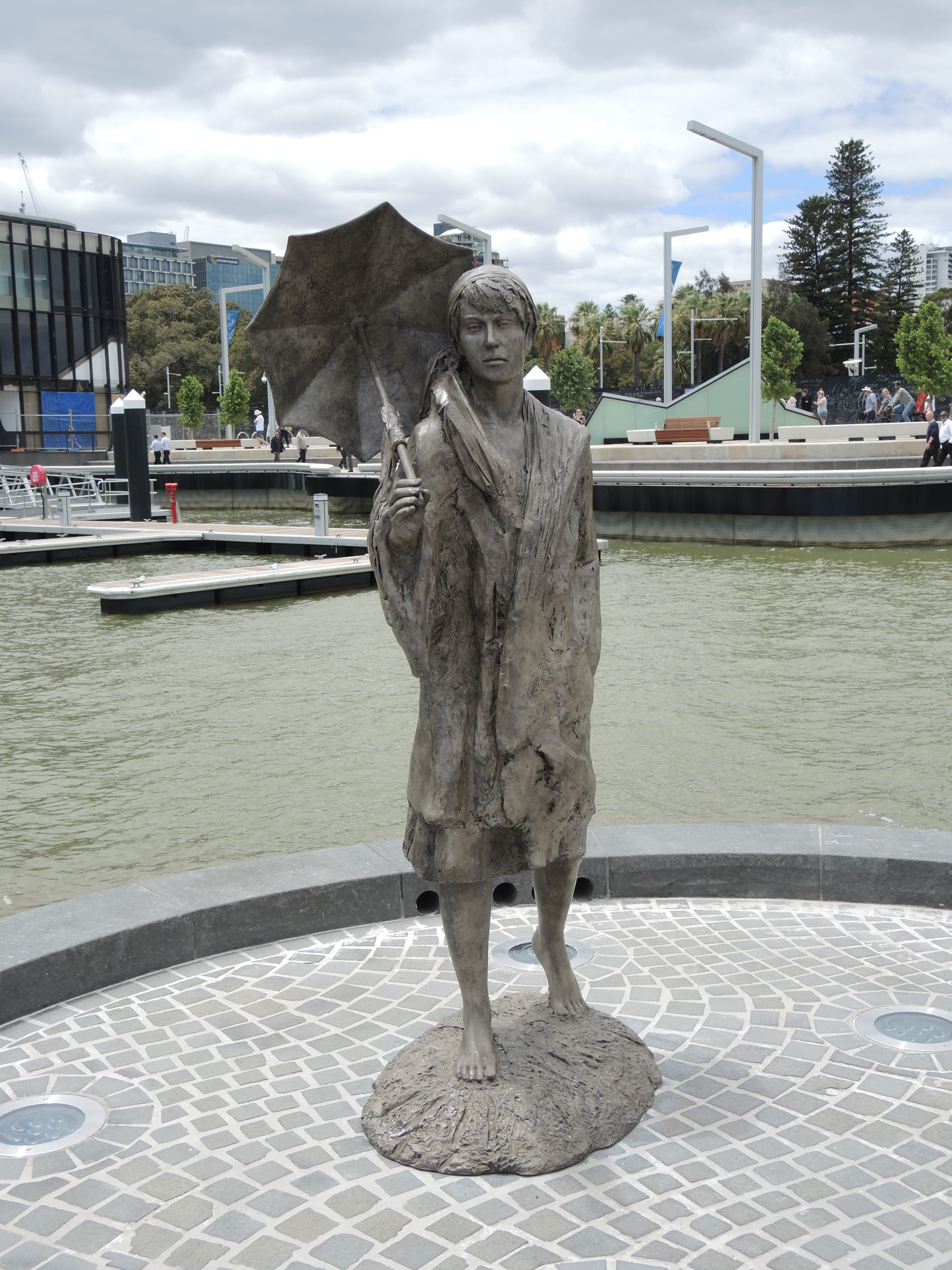
Statue of Bessie Rischbieth

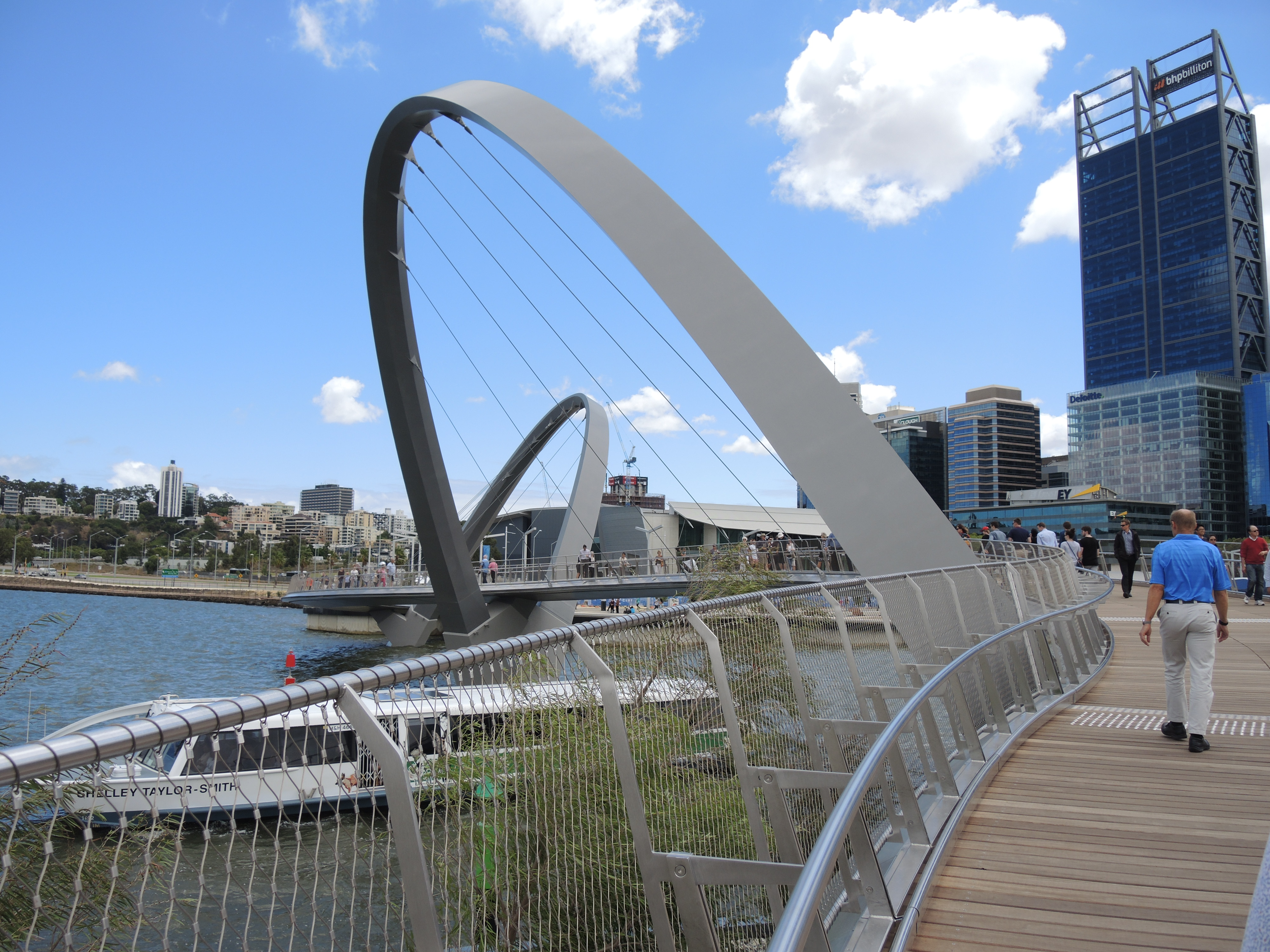
Elizabeth Quay Pedestrian Bridge

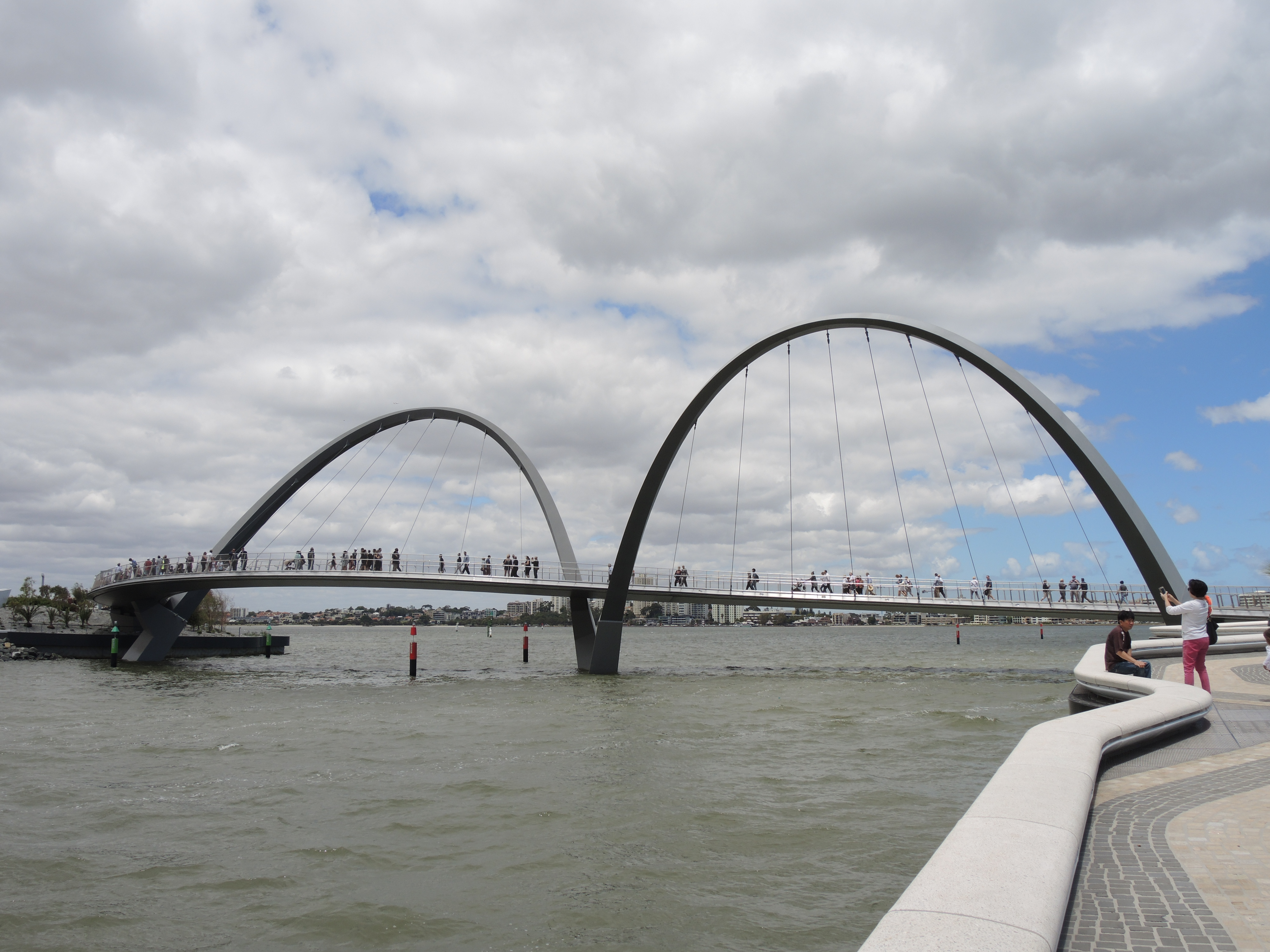
Elizabeth Quay Pedestrian Bridge

== See also ==
- Islands of Perth, Western Australia
- Perth waterfront development proposals

== Sources ==
- "EQ West – Lots 2 and 3 Elizabeth Quay". BG&E. 7 August 2024. "EQ West includes a 180-metre, 52-storey tower and a 100-metre, 25-storey tower and four basement levels. Together, they comprise 493 residential apartments, a 190-room hotel, contemporary commercial space, end of trip facilities, an art gallery and viewing deck, back of house facilities and car parking."
- Weller, Richard (2009). Boomtown 2050. Scenarios for a Rapidly Growing City (1st ed.). Crawley: UWA Publishing. ISBN 978-1-921401-21-3. OCLC 271799666. OL 26151720M.
