= Perth and Tattersalls Bowling and Recreation Club =

Bowling club in Perth, Western Australia

Perth & Tattersalls Bowling and Recreation Club is a bowling club based in East Perth, Western Australia. The club was formed from an amalgamation of the Perth Bowling and Recreation Club and the Western Australian Tattersalls Club in the 1970s. It is the oldest bowling club in Perth, Western Australia.

== History ==
=== Perth Bowling and Recreation Club ===
The Perth Bowling Club was formed in 1895, becoming the first bowling club in Perth. The club began playing on greens on the Perth Esplanade in 1896. The greens were officially opened in April 1896 by club president John Forrest, the Premier of Western Australia.

=== Western Australian Tattersalls Club ===
Several attempts were made in the 1880s and 1890s were made to start up a Tattersalls Club in Perth before the Western Australian Tattersalls Club was established in 1901, with the Club formally registered as a company in 1903.

=== Merger ===
The two clubs agreed to merge in late 1978, with an act of parliament required to approve the merger.

== Venues ==
Soon after the bowling club was founded, work began on building a facility to the north of the Perth Esplanade.

As time went on, with the widening of Riverside Drive and the ongoing reclamation of the Swan River, a move east of the Esplanade began to be suggested.

During the 1960s, the club took over facilities on Plain Street, East Perth that had originally been built for the 1962 Commonwealth Games, but not used.
