= Spanda (Australian art work) =

Public artwork in Perth, Western Australia

Coordinates: 31°57′27″S 115°51′25″E

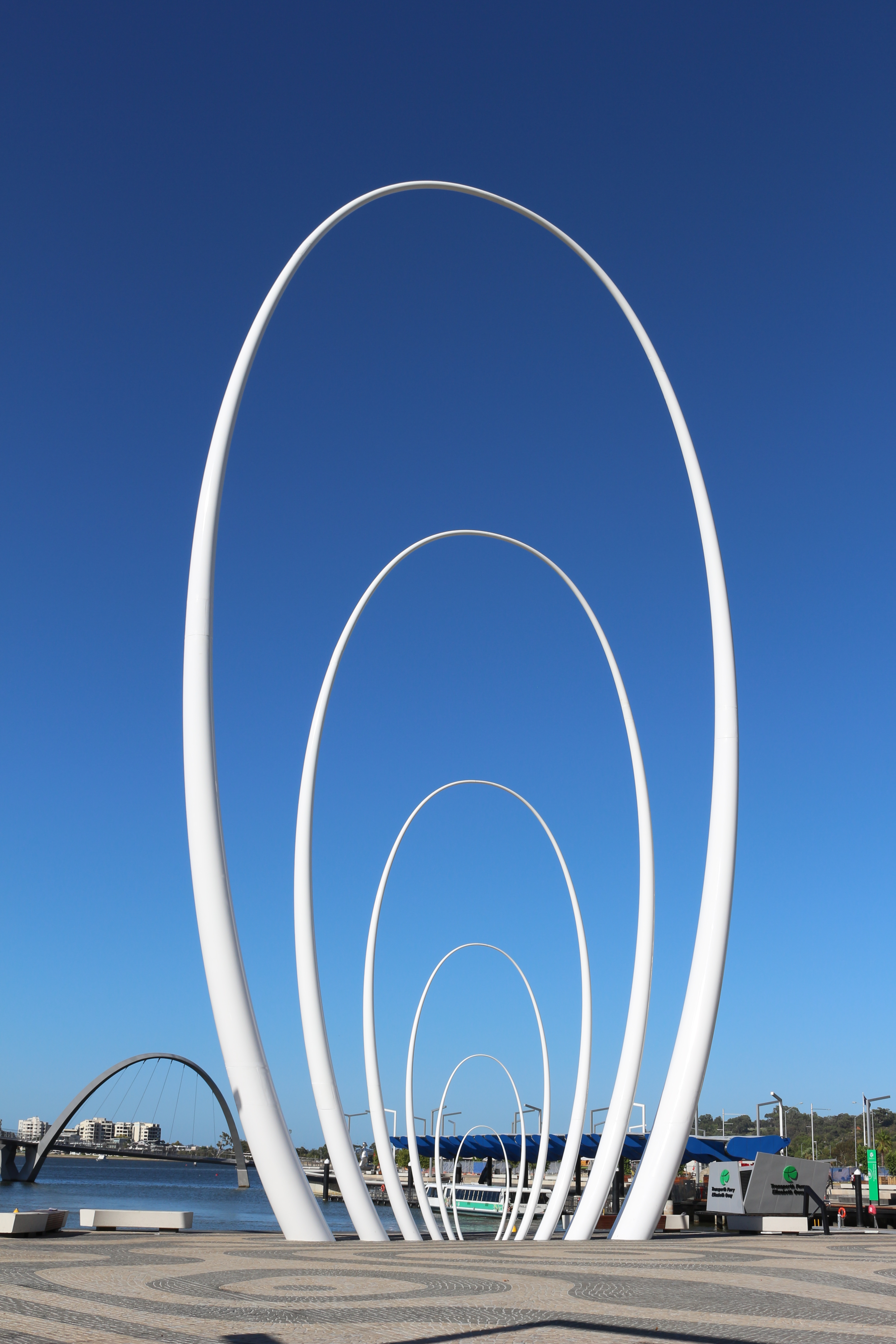
Spanda as viewed when looking out to the Swan River

Spanda is a public art work by Australian born artist Christian de Vietri located at Elizabeth Quay in Perth, Western Australia. It was installed in January 2016. The sculpture is elegant, abstract, and minimalist, giving the impression of an ever-expanding vibrational pattern. It has been described as a celebration of the "union of the individual with the universal". It measures 29 metres (95 ft) high, 16 metres (52 ft) wide and 1 metre (3 ft 3 in) deep. Spanda is the world’s tallest freestanding structure made of carbon fibre.

== Background ==
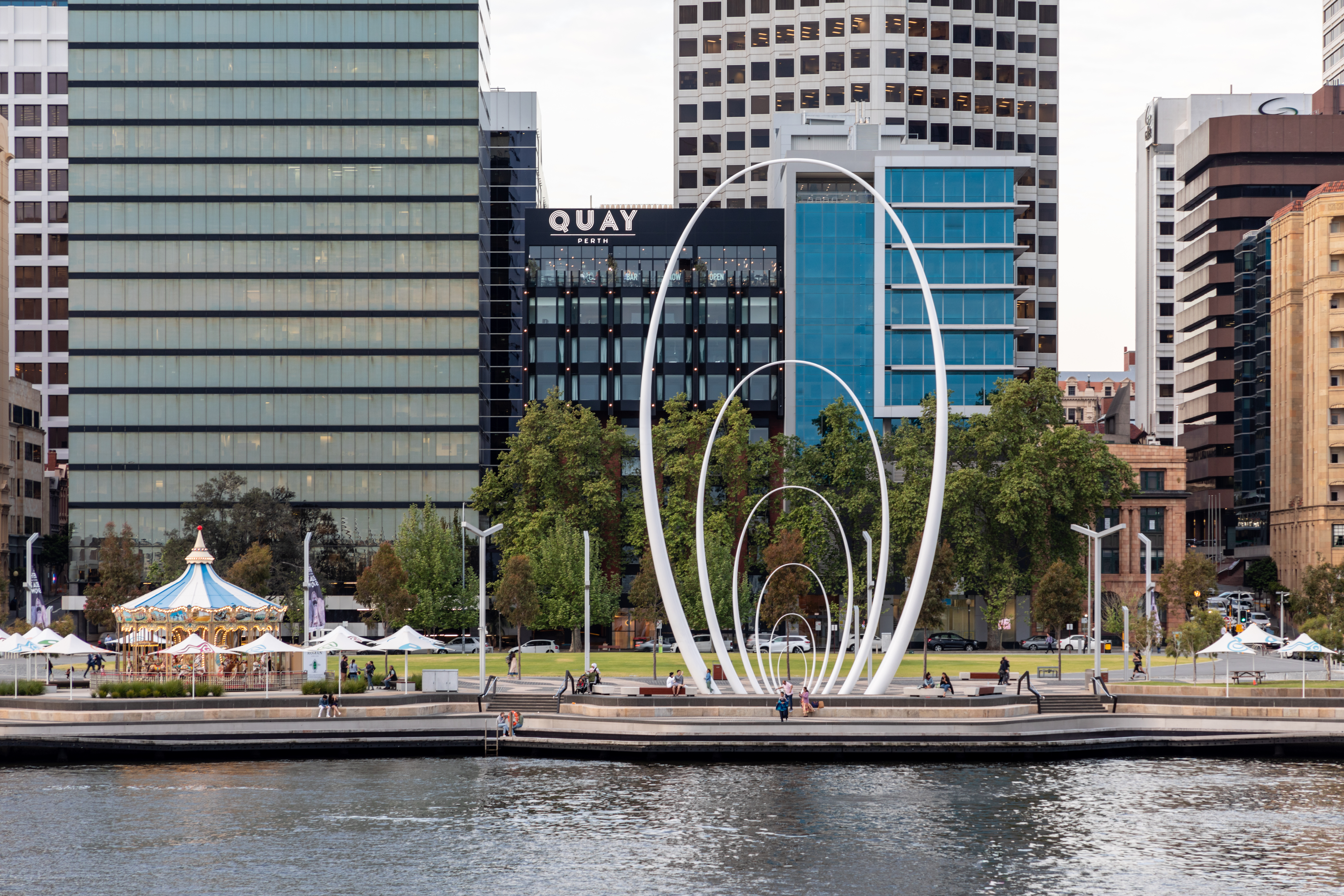
Spanda by Christian de Vietri at Elizabeth Quay in Perth, Western Australia

In September 2014, the Metropolitan Redevelopment Authority in Perth, Western Australia, released an open call for proposals for an artist to create a signature artwork for the Elizabeth Quay development on the Swan River. Several hundred applications were received, and five artists were shortlisted. In March 2015, a panel of 10 individuals unanimously voted to award Christian de Vietri the A$1,380,000 commission, equivalent to A$1.6 million in 2022, to create Spanda.

== Design ==
The artwork is a series of six gloss-white nested arches that are the same shape but varying exponentially in size. The thickness of each arch tapers as it rises from the ground, reaching its finest diameter at the top. The smallest arch is a comfortable frame for a human body, or two. The largest arch reaches 29 metres (95 ft), or 9 stories high, encompassing the smaller five, and reaching beyond the height of some buildings around it. The artwork seems to complete itself by the presence of a human being. When someone stands inside the arch, the shape and the repetitions of the form suggest contours of a moving field surrounding the individual's body, and create the impression of an infinite vibration inwards and/or outwards.

There is a pattern of self-similarity in the way the form is exponentially repeated, which the artists says was;

intended to trigger the viewer’s own inner experience of 'the whole being contained within all the parts', the recognition of themselves as individual expressions of the universal, intimately interconnected and one with their total environment [...].

This could be compared to what William Blake describes in Auguries of Innocence:

To see a World in a Grain of Sand, And a Heaven in a Wild Flower, Hold Infinity in the palm of your hand, And Eternity in an hour [...].

Spanda was conceived and situated by the artist to function harmoniously with the site, Elizabeth Quay, which was designed by ARM Architecture and was being constructed at the same time as the sculpture. Gaps between each arch allow people to walk through the sculpture. The sculpture is installed such that the curvature of the form contrasts with the gridded square buildings behind it, without obscuring the city view.

== Title ==
The title was inspired by de Vietri's experience with the spanda teachings of Kashmir Shaivism. Spanda, is a Sanskrit word meaning 'divine vibration', or 'pulse'. This term is used to describe how consciousness, at the subtlest level, moves in waves of contraction and expansion. Spanda, according to Kashmir Shaivism, is the creative pulse of the Absolute as it manifests into the dynamism of Relative form. It might be understood as the universal desire to manifest, like an eternal spring, joyfully over-flowing and always full. De Vietri is said to have designed the sculpture both as a formal embodiment of this spanda principle, and as a tool, or means, to experience it.

== Construction ==
Spanda was designed by de Vietri using 3D modelling software. To create the structure, carbon fibre manufacturing and design technologies from the aerospace industry were re-purposed by a team of fabricators and engineers. This enabled a unique civil structure that could not have been delivered in traditional materials. Initial tests indicated that it was impossible to make the sculpture in other materials, such as steel. The sculpture was fabricated by the Brisbane based company ShapeShift over a period of nine months. Adam Mitchell was the engineer for the project. Mitchell engineered the sculpture in such a way that maintained the seamlessness and elegance of de Vietri’s design, while at the same time being very strong, even at the finer apex of the form, 30 metres (98 ft) off the ground. Moulds for each element were CNC milled and then formed in carbon fiber reinforced polymer. The arches were made in sections that were then joined on site. The sculpture is coated in a highly durable gloss white finish.

The installation of the sculpture took ten days, the final arch being crane-lifted into place on 22 January 2016.

The lighting of the sculpture was designed by de Vietri in collaboration with the Melbourne based lighting design company Electrolight. The lights are focused to light up the inner face of each arch, making the sculpture appear as if light were radiating out from the centre of the form.

== Reception ==
The official opening of Elizabeth Quay and unveiling of Spanda occurred on 29 January 2016, and was attended by over 30,000 people.

Data from the Metropolitan Redevelopment Authority showed that 6.6 million people visited the sculpture site in its first year of opening. Spanda has been embraced as an icon for the City of Perth, appearing daily as the backdrop for local news shows, and constantly serving as a backdrop for public activities that take place at Elizabeth Quay. It is featured in many souvenirs, postcards, and products from Perth. Various yoga, health, and fitness groups have had activities and events under the arches. Weddings take place there frequently. A pop-up Dîner en Blanc was organized around the sculpture. A sculpture of the Buddha was installed under the arches for the Buddha's Birthday celebration on 8 April 2018.
