= Royal Life Saving Western Australia =

Royal Life Saving Western Australia is a water safety, swimming and lifesaving education organisation in Western Australia. It is the Western Australian branch of the Royal Life Saving Society Australia.

The organisation was founded in May 1909 as the Royal Life Saving Society of Western Australia at a meeting held at the Amateur Sports' Club in Murray Street. Rules largely based on those of the Royal Life Saving Society in London were adopted in June 1909.

By the 1970s officers of the society were travelling to regional and remote centres of the state, such as Paraburdoo to raise public awareness and educate school children and the general public – via lecturers and film, as well as practical demonstrations at swimming pools where possible.

Royal Life Saving WA issues bravery awards for lifesaving acts, to inspire the public to improve their skills in case of emergencies.
