= Perth City Baths =

Former swimming facility in Perth, Western Australia

Coordinates: 31°57′36″S 115°51′25″E

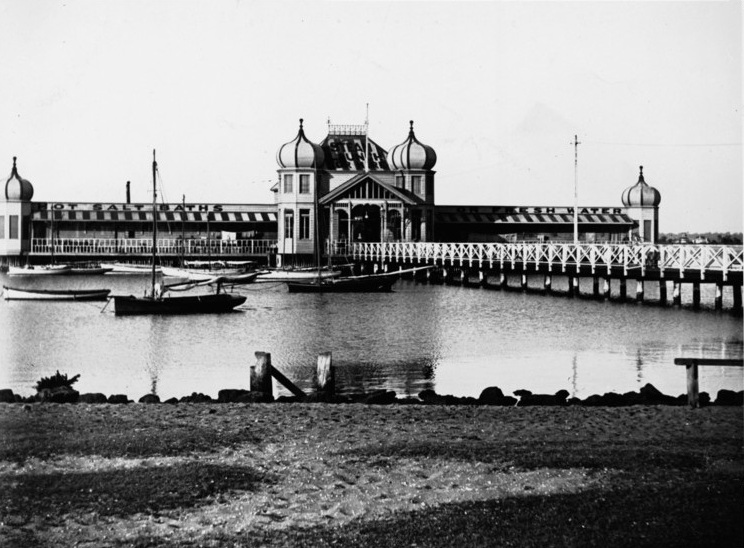
City Baths c. 1900

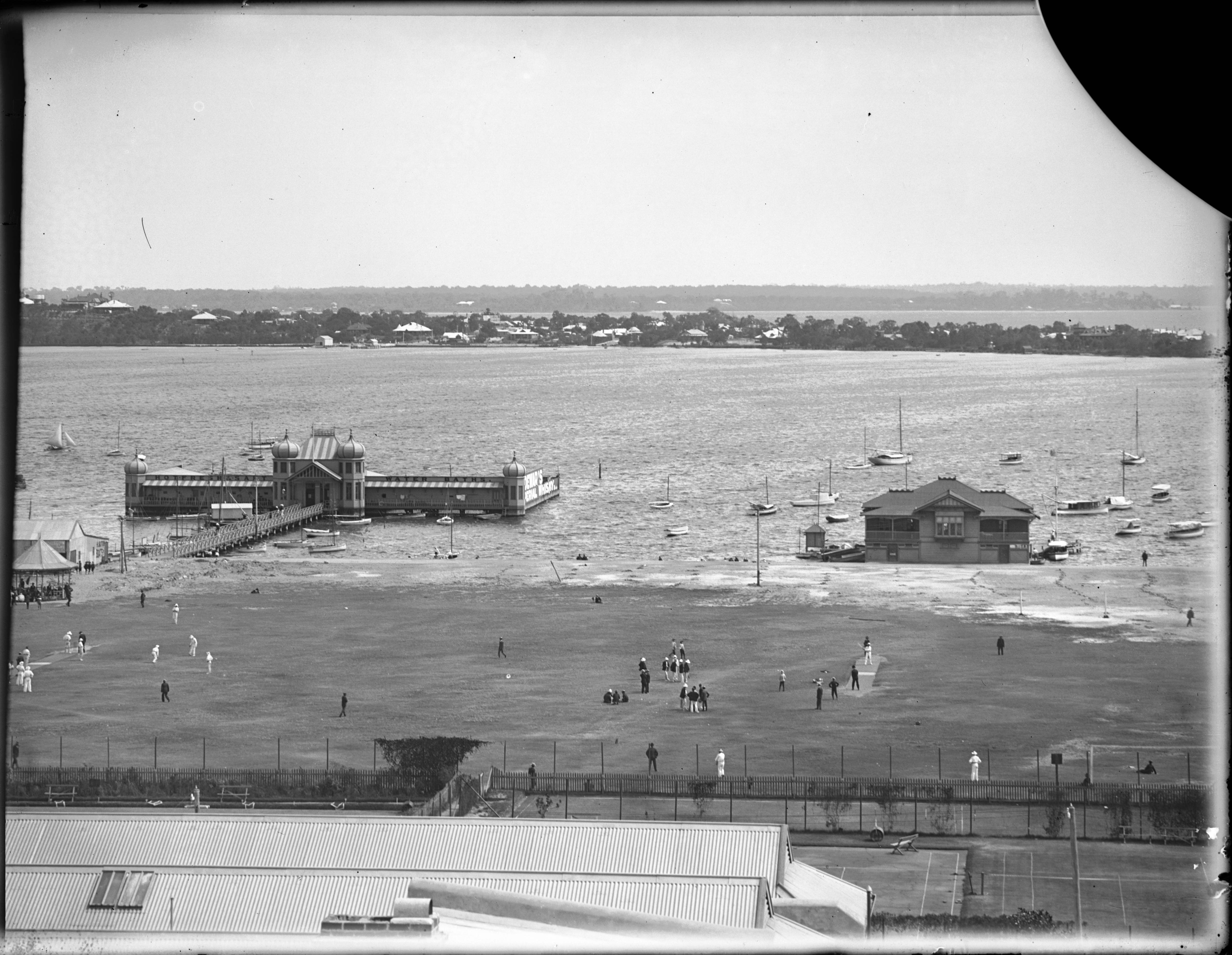
City Baths and The Esplanade c. 1905

Perth City Baths was a public swimming facility, located on the north shore of Perth Water on the Swan River, in Perth, Western Australia. During his 1881 sojourn in Perth, exhibition impresario, Jules Joubert, had recommended that the City consider a public bath. The baths were opened in 1885, with segregated bathing. The ornate Moorish style building was opened on 5 March 1898 by the Mayor of Perth, Alexander Forrest and was leased to the Perth City Council. Costing £2600, equivalent to A$470,300 in 2022, with government support, the mostly jarrah building had four towers capped by cupolas and was designed by G. R. Johnson and built by C. Nelson.

The baths were approached from The Esplanade on a 91-metre-long (300 ft) jetty.

A second set of baths opened at Crawley in February 1914 were the premier baths for the city. Debate about the location had included discussion of the possibility of being able to see into the baths from Kings Park, into the change rooms. The Perth baths were partially demolished in 1917, and completely removed by 1920.
