= Metropolitan Redevelopment Authority =

Statutory authority of Western Australia

Agency overview
- Formed: 1 January 2012
- Preceding agencies: East Perth Redevelopment Authority; Subiaco Redevelopment Authority; Armadale Redevelopment Authority; Midland Redevelopment Authority
- Superseding agency: DevelopmentWA
- Jurisdiction: Perth
- Headquarters: General Post Office, Perth
- Minister responsible: Rita Saffioti, Minister for Planning
- Agency executives: George McCullagh, Chairman; Sean Henriques, Acting Chief Executive Officer
- Key document: Metropolitan Redevelopment Authority Act 2011
- Website: MRA.wa.gov.au

The Metropolitan Redevelopment Authority (MRA) was a statutory authority of the Government of Western Australia. It was established on 1 January 2012 pursuant to the Metropolitan Redevelopment Authority Act 2011 and reported to the Minister for Planning.

The act "... provide[s] for the planning and redevelopment of, and the control of development in certain land in the metropolitan region; and to establish a State agency with planning, development control, land acquisition and disposal and other functions in respect of that land."

The MRA combined the responsibilities and projects formerly undertaken by former redevelopment authorities for East Perth, Subiaco, Midland and Armadale. Projects overseen by the MRA have included Elizabeth Quay, Perth City Link, Perth Cultural Centre and Yagan Square.

In 2019 the MRA merged with LandCorp to form DevelopmentWA.
