= List of Rechabite halls =

This is a list of Rechabite halls, that is, temperance halls associated with the Independent Order of Rechabites.

Article	Location	Country	Year built	Architect
Rechabite Hall, Perth	Perth	Australia	1924	Edwin Summerhayes
Rechabite Hall, Prahran	Prahran	Australia	1888	
Temperance movement in New Zealand	Wellington	New Zealand	before 1886	
Masonic Hall, York	York	Australia	late nineteenth century	
North Adelaide Post Office	North Adelaide	Australia	1855	
	Lerwick	United Kingdom		
List of State Register of Heritage Places in the Shire of Katanning § Shire of Katanning heritage-listed places	Katanning	Australia		
Foresters' Hall, Paddington	Paddington	Australia	before 1906 (rented)	
Little Theatre (Leicester)	Leicester	United Kingdom	before 1922	
Registered Buildings and Conservation Areas of the Isle of Man	Douglas	United Kingdom	9 November 1988	
