= Summerhayes =

Summerhayes is an English surname. Notable people with the surname include:

- David Summerhayes (active 1965–68), Welsh footballer
- Edwin Summerhayes (1868–1944), Australian architect
- Geoffrey Edwin Summerhayes (1928–2010), Australian architect
- Glenn Summerhayes (born 1954), New Zealand archaeologist
- Katie Summerhayes (born 1995), British freestyle skier, sister of Molly
- Martha Summerhayes (1844–1926), American memoirist
- Molly Summerhayes (born 1997), British freestyle skier, sister of Katie
- V. S. Summerhayes (1897–1974), English botanist
- Violet Summerhayes (1878–1974), Canadian tennis player

== See also ==
- Summerhayesia, a genus of flowering plants
