= Summerhays =

Summerhays is an English surname. Notable people with the surname include:

- Bob Summerhays (1927–2017), American football player
- Bruce Summerhays (born 1944), American golfer and Mormon leader
- Daniel Summerhays (born 1983), American golfer
- Gary Summerhays (1950–2021), Canadian boxer
- Jane Summerhays (born 1944), American actress
- R. S. Summerhays (d. 1976), British expert and author in equine matters
- Robert R. Summerhays (born 1965), American judge
