= West Australian Institute of Architects =

Former Western Australian professional body

The West Australian Institute of Architects (WAIA) was a professional society for architects in Western Australia.

== History ==
The West Australian Institute of Architects (WAIA) was founded in May 1896, with George Temple-Poole as inaugural president. Edwin Summerhayes was a founding member.

In March 1943, WAIA merged with the Australian Institute of Architects (RAIA), becoming RAIA's Western Australian chapter.

== Publication ==
The Architect was a quarterly publication between 1939 and 2007.

== See also ==
- Architecture of Australia
