= Rechabite Hall, Perth =

Heritage-listed building in Perth, Western Australia

Rechabite Hall
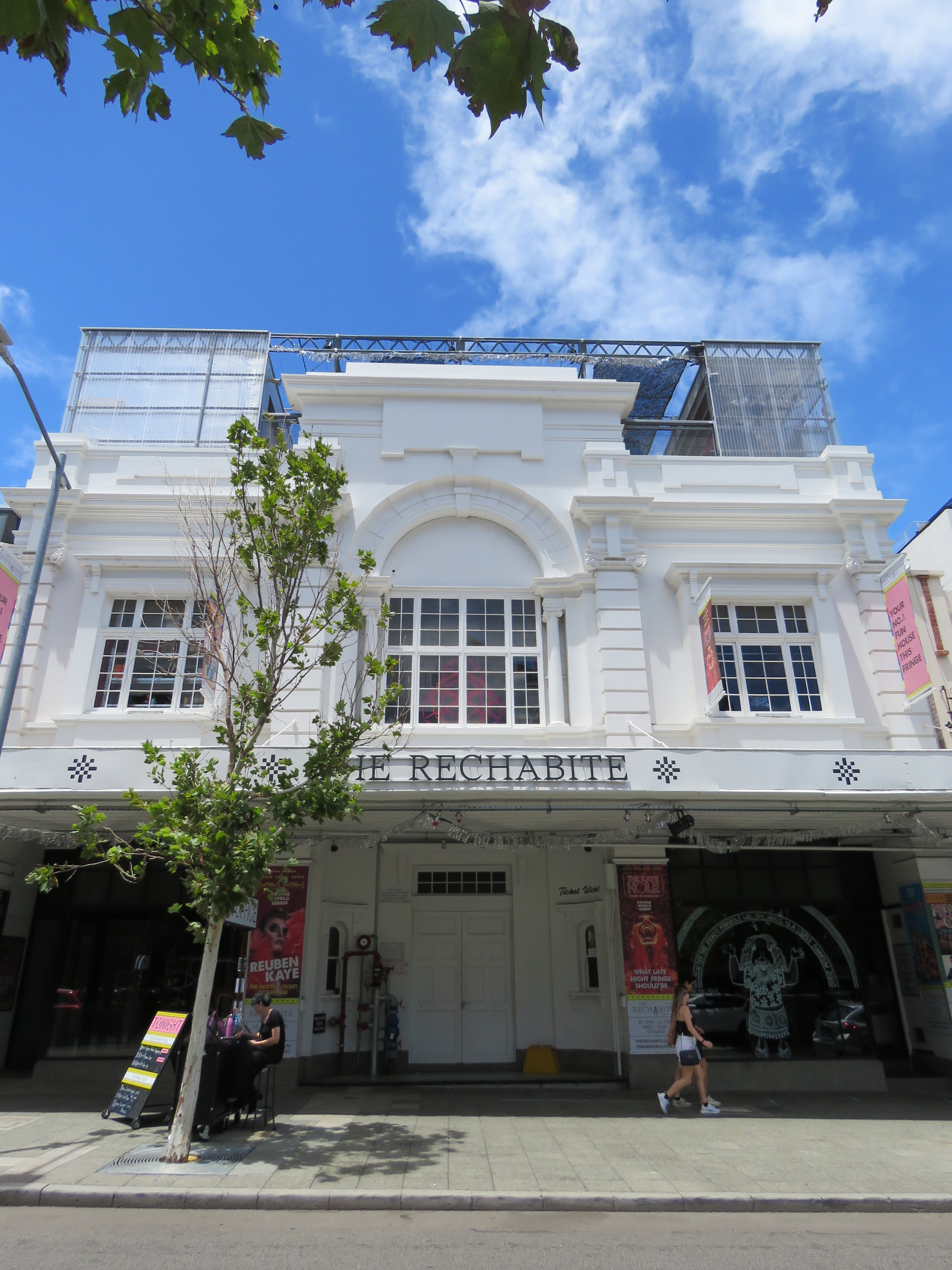
- The Rechabite Hall in January 2021
- Interactive map of the Rechabite Hall area

General information
- Type: Heritage listed building
- Location: Perth, Western Australia
- Coordinates: 31.948658°S 115.859864°E

Western Australia Heritage Register
- Type: State Registered Place
- Designated: 20 December 2002
- Reference no.: 2155

Rechabite Hall is a heritage-listed building in Perth, Western Australia, located at 224 William Street. It has operated as The Rechabite since 2019. It was constructed in 1924 for the Independent Order of Rechabites – a friendly society and part of the temperance movement – and was a popular dance hall in the 1920s. It was also used for balls, exhibitions, church services, conferences, annual meetings, school productions, and as an election polling station.

The hall was also a theatre venue and live music venue until it was damaged by a fire in 1980. The street level remained in use as shops. The building closed in the early 2000s in a state of disrepair. In the interim, performances were still held there in the early 2000s.

The building was listed on the City of Perth's heritage list in 2001, and on the State Register of Heritage Places in 2002. In 2016, approval was given for a A$3 million refurbishment, and it re-opened in November 2019 as four venues: a rooftop bar, a basement club, a performance hall and an eatery.

Rechabite Hall was designed by architect Edwin Summerhayes, as his last major work, in the Inter-War Free Classical style. The facade, entry foyer and hall are particularly noteworthy examples of the style; other significant architectural features include the entry hall's mosaic tile floor, main jarrah staircase, and the main hall's vaulted ceiling – extensively lined with pressed metal embossed decorative patterns. The hall is in a generally sound condition, with a moderate degree of historical integrity and authenticity. Damage from the 1980 fire is evident, and there have been some internal modifications made in the basement and the northern shopfront.
