= R. S. Summerhays =

British equestrian and writer

Reginald Summerhays
- Born: 1880; Kingston upon Thames, England
- Died: October 25, 1976 (aged 95–96); Wimbledon
- Occupations: Equestrian, Horse Expert, Writer
- Years active: c. 1920-1970

For the Australian architect, see Reginald Summerhayes

Reginald Sherriff Summerhays (1880–1976) was a British equestrian, horse expert, and writer.

== Biography ==
Summerhays was born in 1880, in Kingston, one of eight children of Thomas Charles Summerhays, an affluent lawyer, and Marian Edith Sherriff. He was educated at Rokeby Preparatory School and Westminster School, and became a lawyer. In 1906, in Wimbledon, Summerhays married Anne M. Owen. They had three children and, from 1911, lived at Thames Ditton and Wimbledon.

Summerhays' stature was slight, or jockey size. He began riding horses at age five and had the "sympathetic hands" of a natural horseman. He hunted, played polo and, in 1921, rode in the Arab Horse Endurance Test.

With the outbreak of World War I, Summerhays was appointed by the British War Office as Civilian Remount Purchasing Officer, attached to the Army Service Corps. His duty was to purchase horses for use in the war, and manage their inventory.

Over the course of his life, Summerhays judged at least 500 horse shows covering virtually every breed and type of horse. He acted as President of the National Pony Society, the Donkey Breed Society, and the Arab Horse Society, and was involved with the British Show Pony Society, the Hackney Horse Society and the British Palomino Society. He inaugurated the Horse and Pony Breeding and Benefit Fund and, in 1947, founded the Horseman's Sunday gathering at Epsom Downs, an annual event which ran until 2009.

In his 50s, Summerhays became the founding editor of Riding Magazine and began to write books. At least three of his books continue to be best-sellers, with The Elements of Riding, The Problem Horse and The Summerhays Encyclopaedia for Horsemen having been translated into many languages.

Summerhays died in Wimbledon on October 25, 1976, age 96.

== Bibliography ==
- Here's Horse Sense! A Book for Horse Lovers Young and Old, 1932
- From Saddle and Fireside, 1936
- Elements of Riding, 1937
- Elements of Hunting, 1938
- Riding For All, 1939
- The Observer's Book of Horses and Ponies (1948)
- The Problem Horse, 1949
- Ponies, 1950
- It's A Good Life With Horses, 1951
- Summerhays' Encyclopedia for Horsemen, 1952
- Riding on a Small Income, 1953
- In Praise of the Arabian Horse, 1954, with Frederick William F. Staveacre
- The Story of the international 1907-1957, 1957
- The Young Rider's Guide to the Horse World, 1960
- A Lifetime with Horses, 1962
- The Country Life Horseman's Pocket Book, 1964
- The Controversial Horse, A Conversation Piece, 1966
- The Arabian Horse in Great Britain, 1967
- The Arabian Horse: The Breed in Britain, 1969
- Horse Shows: The Judges, Stewards and Organisers, 1969, with C. E. G. Hope
- The Donkey Owner's Guide, 1970
