= Observer's Books =

Series of pocket guidebooks

A selection of Observer's Books including the first in the series, British Birds (1937), showing the wavy line pattern on the dustjackets

The Observer's Books are a series of small, pocket-sized books, published by Frederick Warne & Co in the United Kingdom from 1937 to 2003. They covered topics such as hobbies, art, history and wildlife. Intended for children, the aim of these books was to interest the observer. Some of them have become collector's items. For the dedicated collector this could be a lifetime's work as there are over 800 variations, some of which are now rare. The values of the books can vary from 50 pence to hundreds of pounds.

The books were printed with plain paper dust jackets until 1969. Each one had a unique pattern of squiggly lines at the top but these were not especially practical because they were easy to rip and stain. From 1970, the covers were protected with a glossy coating. These types are often referred to as "Glossies". From the late 1970s, Warne laminated the covers to the actual books to make them sturdier and more resistant to wear.

The first Observer's guide was published in 1937, and was on the subject of British birds. This is now rare, and a mint copy with a dust cover is worth hundreds of pounds. The same year, Warne published a second Observer's book on British wild flowers. A mint copy of this book is worth around £220. When the popularity of these was recognized, several more titles were added 'uniform in the series', but during World War II production was limited due to paper and labour shortages. Even so, by 1941 Warne had published the first six Observer's books.

In 1942 a special edition book was brought out on "airplanes" [sic]. This book had no number in the series, as it was brought out to help people spot enemy warplanes. It was reprinted in 1943 and 1945.

The first few Observer's titles had focused on nature, but gradually subjects like geology, music and architecture were introduced. 'Spotter' titles like Aircraft, Automobiles and Railway Locomotives proved successful.

When Warne was acquired by Penguin Books in 1983, Warne brought out new editions of the Observer's books. These were slightly larger than the original books, and were in paperback, not hardback. The same year Penguin, started publishing their own, more up-to-date Observer's books. These again were of a marginally increased size over the originals, but were hardbacks. Like the later original Observer's books, the dust covers were laminated to the actual book. There were two types of the Penguin Observer's books: Bloomsbury Observer's, and Claremont Observer's, (of which there were only 12 different editions).

After a hiatus of 17 years, Peregrine Books published the appropriately titled Observer's Book of Observer's Books in 1999, in a format that matched the original editions and was numbered 99 so as to follow on from the last 'official' title. As the title implies, it is a guide to the series with details of its history, authors, and print-runs. As a sign of the series' collectability, this potentially obscure book has been reprinted no fewer than nine times. The series was rounded up to 100 with the publication of Wayside and Woodland in 2003.

== List of Observer's Books ==
1. British birds - 1937
2. British wild flowers – 1937
3. British butterflies – 1938
4. Trees and shrubs of the British Isles – 1938
5. British wild animals – 1938
6. Freshwater fishes of the British Isles – 1941
7. British grasses sedges and rushes – 1942
  Airplanes – 1942
8. Dogs – 1945
9. Horses and Ponies – 1948
10. British geology – 1949
11. Aircraft – 1949
12. British ferns – 1950
13. British architecture – 1951
14. The larger British moths – 1952
15. Ships – 1952
16. Music – 1953
17. Common British insects and spiders – 1953
18. British birds eggs – 1954
19. Common fungi – 1954
20. Mosses and liverworts – 1955
21. Automobiles – 1955 to 1986, Cars 1987 to 1992
22. Weather – 1955
23. Railway locomotives of Britain – 1955
24. Pond life – 1956
25. Garden flowers – 1956
26. Painting and graphic art – 1958
27. Cacti – 1957
28. Sea fishes – 1958
29. Flags – 1959
30. Cats – 1959
31. Sea and seashore – 1962
32. Astronomy – 1962
33. Lichens – 1963
34. Modern art – 1964
35. Furniture – 1964
36. Old English churches – 1965
37. Sculpture – 1965
38. Basic aircraft, civil – 1967
39. Basic aircraft, military – 1967
40. Commercial vehicles – 1959
41. Heraldry – 1966
42. Postage stamps – 1967
43. Cathedrals – 1972
44. Flowering trees and shrubs for gardens – 1972
45. Zoo animals – 1972
46. House plants – 1972
47. Association football – 1972
48. Manned space flight - 1972
49. Cricket – 1972
50. London – 1973
51. Pottery and porcelain – 1973
52. Unmanned space flight – 1974
53. Motor sport – 1975
54. European costume – 1975
55. British awards and medals – 1974
56. Ancient and Roman Britain – 1976
57. Sewing – 1975
58. Golf – 1975
59. Coarse fishing – 1975
60. Show jumping and eventing – 1976
61. Motorcycles – 1976
62. Glass – 1976
63. Tourist atlas of Great Britain and Northern Ireland – 1976
64. Small craft – 1976
65. Tropical fish – 1976
66. Farm animals – 1976
67. Vegetables – 1977
68. Fly fishing – 1977
69. Coins – 1977
70. Seashells of the British Isles – 1977
71. Fossils – 1977
72. Pets – 1978
73. The Cotswolds and Shakespeare country – 1978
74. Lake district – 1978
75. Firearms – 1978
76. Jazz – 1978
77. Big bands – 1978
78. Castles – 1979
79. Caterpillars – 1979
80. Rocks and minerals – 1979
81. Tennis – 1981
82. Sea fishing – 1980
83. Devon and Cornwall – 1980
84. Roses – 1980
85. Herbs – 1980
86. Country houses – 1980 – NOT PUBLISHED
87. Folk song – 1980
88. Silver – 1980
89. Tanks and other armoured vehicles – 1981
90. Victoriana – 1981
91. World atlas – 1981
92. Vintage cars and pre–war classics – 1982
93. Classic cars after 1945 – 1982
94. Paris – 1982
95. Canals – 1982
96. Gardens of Britain Ireland and Wales – 1982
97. Kitchen antiques – 1982
98. Opera – 1982
99. Observer's books – 1999
100. Wayside and woodland - 2003
