= Independent Order of Rechabites =

Fraternal organisation and friendly society, 1835-

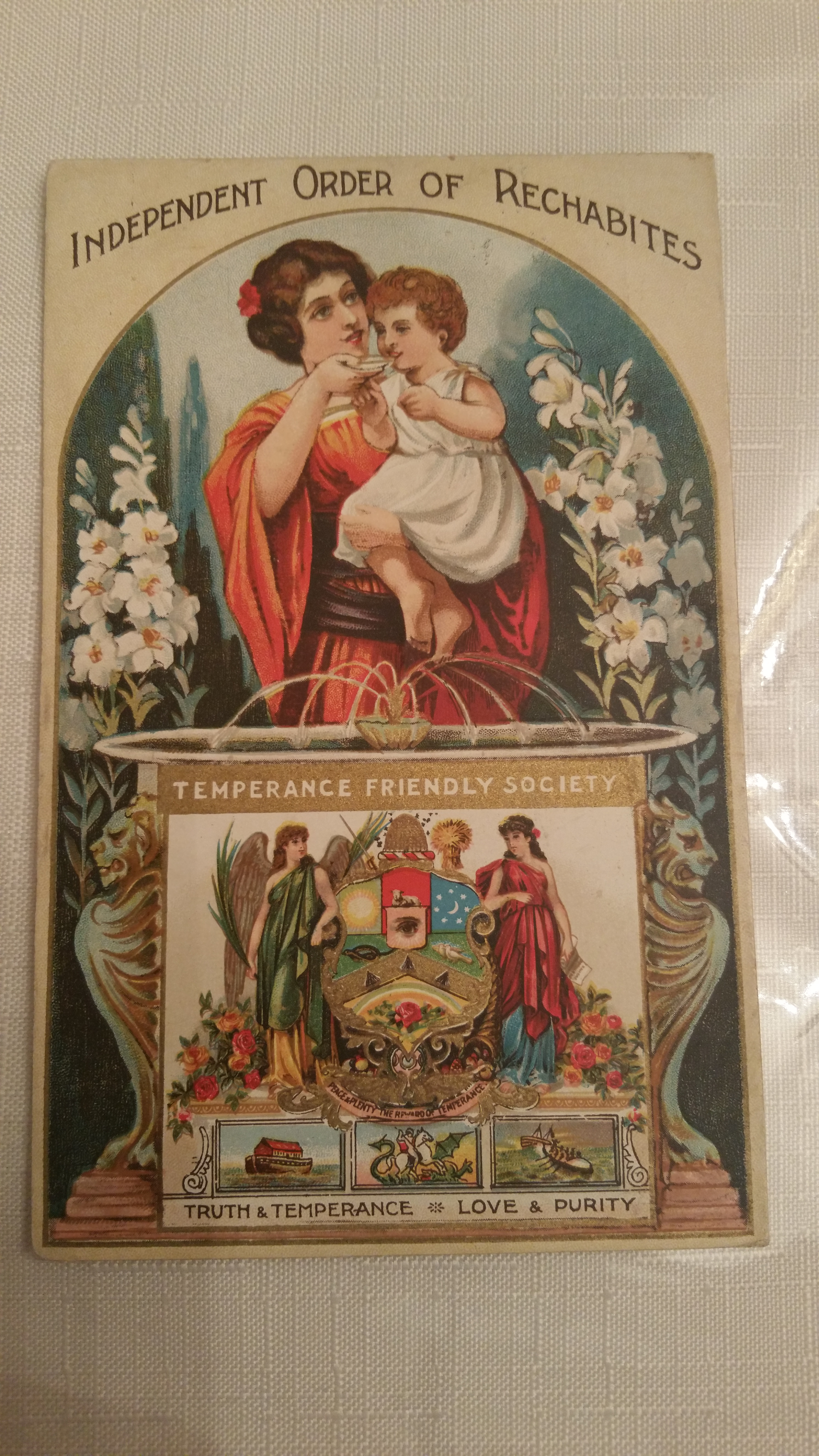
A 1910 Independent Order of Rechabites (IOR) postcard.

The Independent Order of Rechabites (IOR), also known as the Sons and Daughters of Rechab, is a fraternal organisation and friendly society founded in England in 1835 as part of the wider temperance movement to promote total abstinence from alcoholic beverages. The Order has been active in Australia from 1843, promoting temperance and as a benefit society. A branch was established in the United States in 1842, and also flourished for a time. In the United Kingdom, the Order trades under the name of Healthy Investment, being well connected in upper society and involved in financial matters; there it gradually transformed into a financial institution which promotes teetotalism.

== History ==
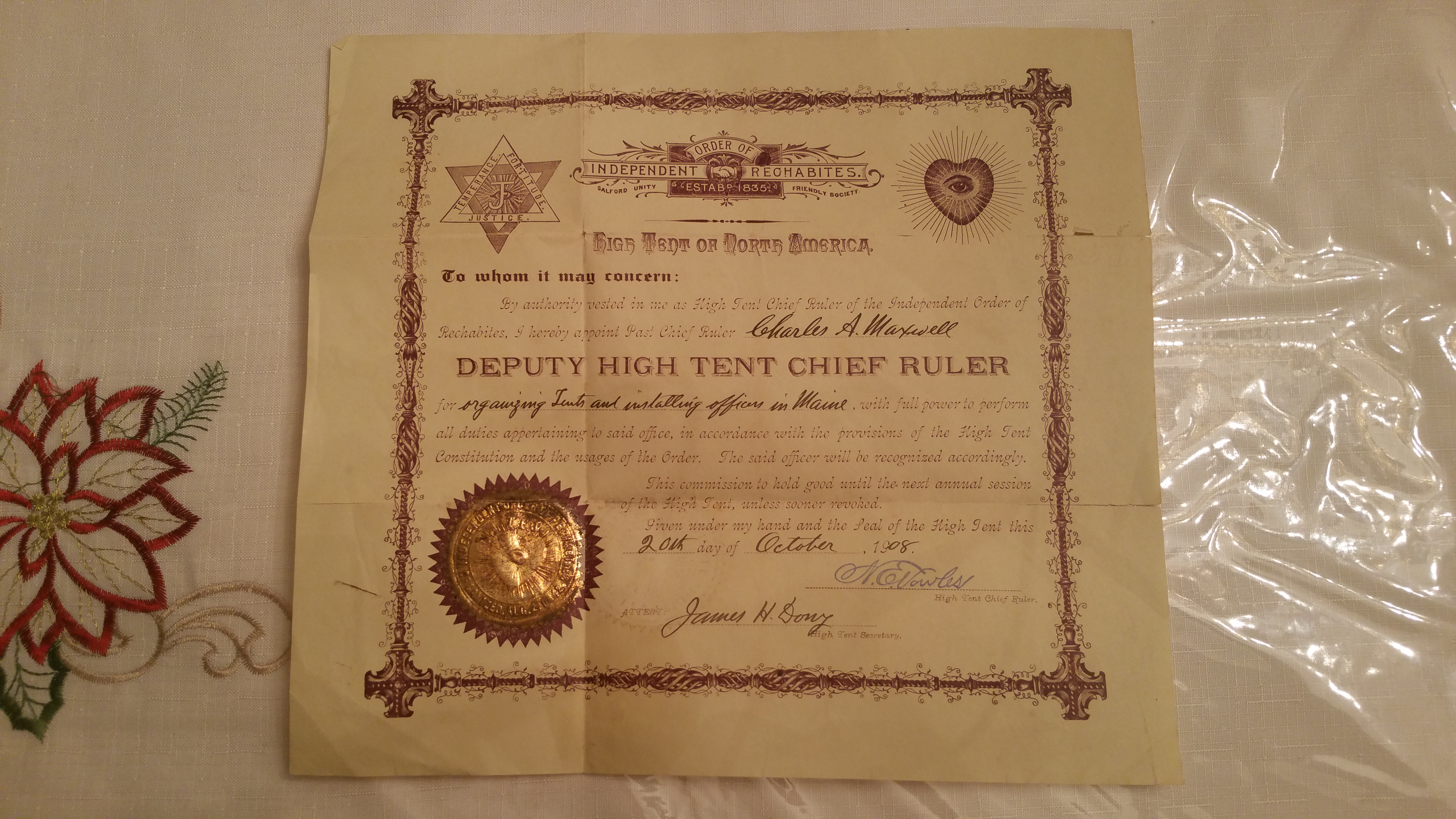
A 1908 Independent Order of Rechabites certificate for the instatement of a member as Deputy High Tent Chief Ruler

The Independent Order of Rechabites was founded on 25 August 1835 as the Salford Unity of Rechabites, in the city of Salford, Lancashire, England. Their first lodge was "Tent Ebenezer #1" and soon "tents" were founded for adult females (over the age of 12), boys (aged 12–16), and for children of both sexes (age 5-12), as well as other adult males (age 16 and up.) In describing the heritage of the Independent Order of Rechabites, a circa 1892 newspaper in Leeds said:

If any order in the world has a claim to call itself an Ancient Order it is that of the Rechabites. As we learn from the Scriptures, a command was laid over 2,700 years ago upon the sons of Jonadab, the son of Rechab, that they should drink no wine, neither they nor their sons forever; and the injunction has been obeyed to this day. At various periods in modern history have travelers come upon the lineal descendants of these Rechabites of old, in Spain, in the districts visited by Dr. Wolff, and in the neighborhood of the Dead Sea, still adhering faithfully to their total abstinence principles. Other orders may claim the questionable honor of being founded by extremely mythical personages, but the Independent Order of Rechabites, if it cannot prove an uninterrupted kind of apostolic succession from Rechab, can show that it has at least a continuity and similarity of aim that effectually connect it with the Rechabites of old. The promise of Jeremiah that for their faithfulness in adhering to the command of their forefathers they should not want a man of the house of Rechab to stand before the Lord forever has literally been fulfilled. There is no break in the chain, and for nearly 3,000 years a living testimony of total abstienence has been upheld on the earth.

The rituals and ceremonies of the Rechabites vary from place to place but the order promoted three degrees, Knight of Temperance, Knight of Fortitude, and Covenanted Knight of Justice. Lodges are called tents because Jehonadab (or Jonadab) commanded the Biblical sons of Rechab to live in tents (Jeremiah 35:6-7) and the governing body, in England at least, was called the Movable Committee, meeting in a different city every two years. Membership remains open to all who would sign a pledge to completely abstain from alcohol except for religious or medical purposes. There were also death and sickness benefits.

From the late 18th century a number of Friendly Societies had been set up to help working-class people with such things as health insurance and death benefits. Generally these societies held their meetings in pubs. In the 1830s a group of Manchester Methodists became concerned that by encouraging working men to attend public houses to pay their friendly society dues, then the societies were harming the men's health and financial situation and threatening their moral welfare, rather than helping them. To counter this they set up a new Friendly Society called the Independent Order of Rechabites, named after the nomadic, abstaining Rechabites of the Old Testament. The organization was still active in the middle 20th century; Sir David Cannadine (British historian, born in Birmingham in 1950) described in 2019 attending a Rechabite meeting with his grandparents who were members.

A branch may be known as a "Tent", since the biblical Rechabites lived exclusively in tents. Each Tent is ruled by a High Chief Ruler, assisted by a High Deputy Ruler, Corresponding Secretary, Sick and Tent Stewards, Inside and Outside Guardians, a Levite of the Tent and a number of Elders. Before one could join the Rechabites and benefit from their insurance and saving scheme, a document had to be signed swearing that the proposed member and his family would not drink any alcoholic beverages. This document is known as The Pledge and represents a solemn promise. The initials "IOR" on a tombstone may indicate that the deceased was a member of the organisation.

The Victoria District of the Independent Order of Rechabites currently has 17 Tents and 5 Regions, while the Queensland District of The Independent Order of Rechabites currently has four Tents and two social committees.

== By country ==
=== Australia ===
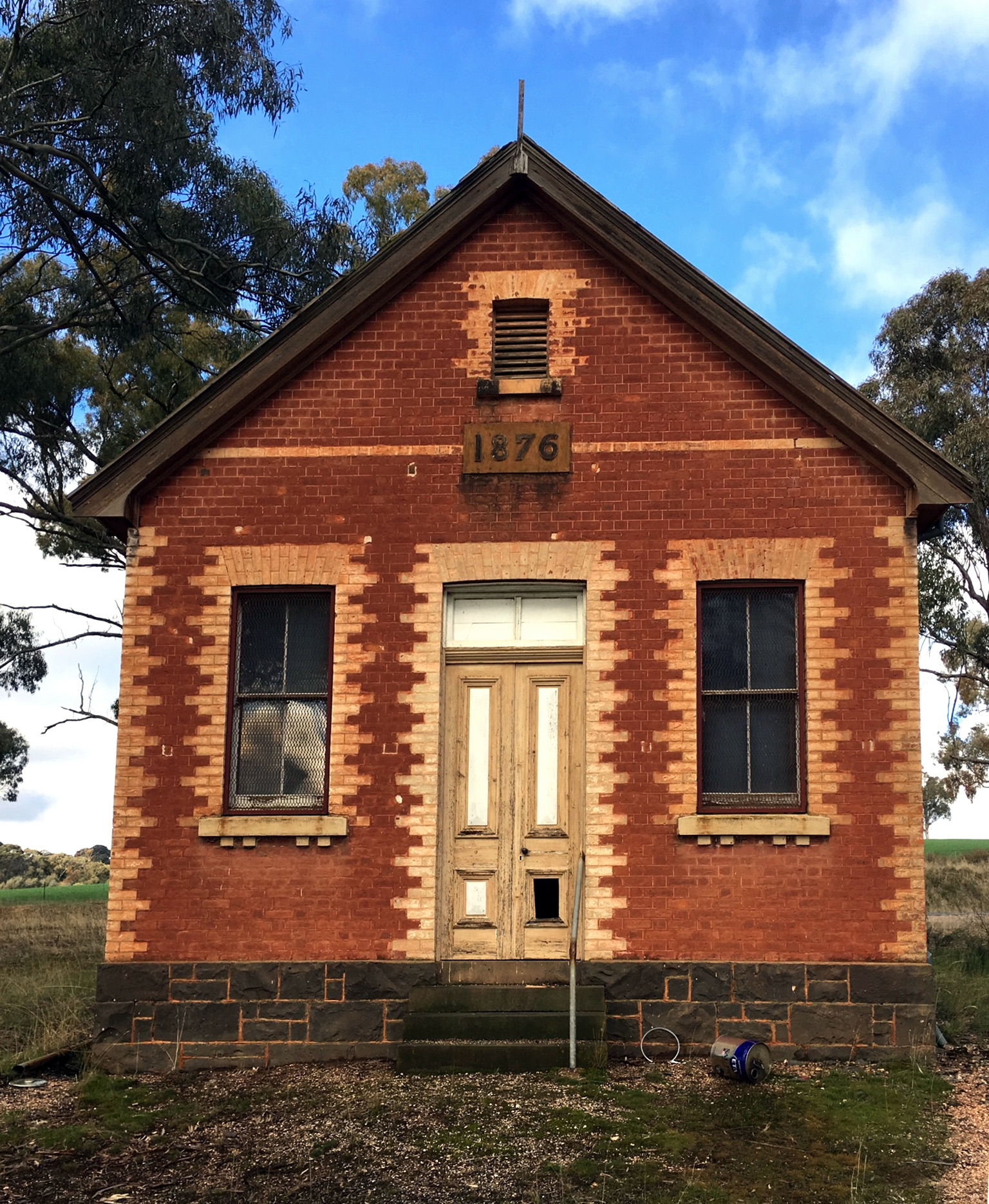
The Bung Bong IOR Tent 138

In Australia the IOR was first established in Tasmania in 1843, soon spreading to other states. Members of the IOR were provided with assistance during times of sickness, death and hardship.

IOR was active in Victoria and in 1876 it established 'Tent' 138 in Bung Bong rural Victoria. The Building was also used for community purposes including meetings of the 'Farmers Club' and as a Church of England.

In 1991, IOR Victoria combined with the IOR in other states to form a national private health fund. Members wishing to join IOR's health fund were no longer required to sign a pledge of abstinence from alcohol. In 2005 the IOR health fund was sold to HCF Health Insurance, and the rest of the organisation continued as a temperance promoting organisation. In 2008, 38.5 million dollars of its funds management was transferred to the Foresters Friendly Society. As of 2024, the Independent Order of Rechabites retains a state branch in Victoria, with a number of affiliated tents.

=== United Kingdom ===
Branches of the Order were recorded in: Manchester in 1835; Skipsea, Yorkshire, in 1838; Leek, Staffordshire in 1839; Banbury (the Rechabites Cadbury Tent) in the 1880s; Burntwood in the 1890s; Lichfield in 1911; Leicester in 1922; Gloucester in 1930; Marlborough in 1937; and Telford in 1940.

Since 2004 the Rechabite Friendly Society has traded as Healthy Investment, a financial services organisation that continues to specialise in providing ethical savings and investment products, not restricted to teetotallers. The Society avoids direct investment in companies in the alcohol, arms, tobacco, gambling and pornography industries. It is a with-profits provider, which as a mutual insurance company means that there are no shareholders to benefit from members' investments.

The Society provides Tax Exempt Savings Plans only offered by Friendly Societies, and other savings products.

=== United States and Canada ===
In the United States and Canada there were several orders of Rechabites including the Independent Order of Rechabites of North America and the Encamped Knights of Rechab of North America. The most successful, however, was the Independent Order of Rechabites, which was founded in 1842 and was reported to have 990,000 at the beginning of the twentieth century. Like the Order in Britain, its local groups were called Tents. The national structure was the "High Tent" and the order was headquartered in Washington, DC. Membership was open to males aged 16 to 55, females aged twelve and up, and juveniles aged 5-16; the primary tents were composed of males 16–55 years old who believed in a Supreme Being and signed a total abstinence pledge. Individuals over fifty five were admitted as honorary members, and females over twelve and males under sixteen were permitted to form their own Tents. The Order worked three degrees: Knight of Temperance, Knight of Fortitude and Covenanted Knight of Justice.

== Archives ==
The archives of the Independent Order of Rechabites have been deposited at Senate House Library, University of London. Some material, including a history of the Glasgow District No. 40, is also held by the Archives of the University of Glasgow. Numerous archives of branches are held at local record offices.

== See also ==
- List of Rechabite halls
- Christian views on alcohol
- Temperance movement

== Publications ==
- Leach, W. T. (William Turnbull), 1805-1886 An address on rechabitism: delivered at the quarterly meeting of the members of the Independent Order of Rechabites, in the hall of the Spring of Canada Tent on the 18th July, 1845 Montreal? : s.n.] 1845
- Rules for the government of the Stepney Tent, no. 83 : of the Independent Order of Rechabites, Salford Unity, Friendly Society, East Riding District Hull : Printed by F. Oliver 1873
- General laws for the government of the Independent Order of Rechabites, Salford Unity, Friendly Society : adopted by the Moveable Conference, August, 1853, and amended by subsequent M.C.s, 1854 to 1873 : registered under the Friendly Societies' Act 13 and 14 Victoria, Cap. 115 Manchester : Published by the Board of Directors, at the Offices of the Order 1873
- Rules of the Independent Order of Rechabites, Salford Unity, Friendly Society, as amended by the Glasgow H.M.C., 1887 : registered under the Friendly Societies Acts 1887
