= Pioneer Women's Memorial (Perth) =

Memorial in Kings Park, Western Australia

Coordinates: 31.9627°S 115.8389°E

The Pioneer Women's Memorial is located in the Western Australian Botanic Garden, within Kings Park, Perth, Western Australia. It comprises a lake, sculpture and fountain and was built to honour the contributions of pioneering women to the development of the city and state.

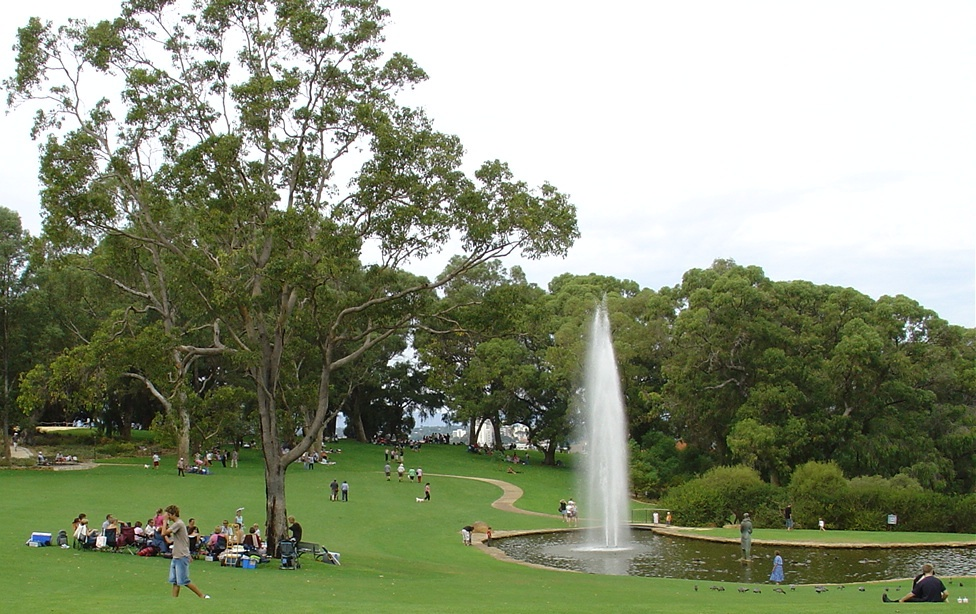

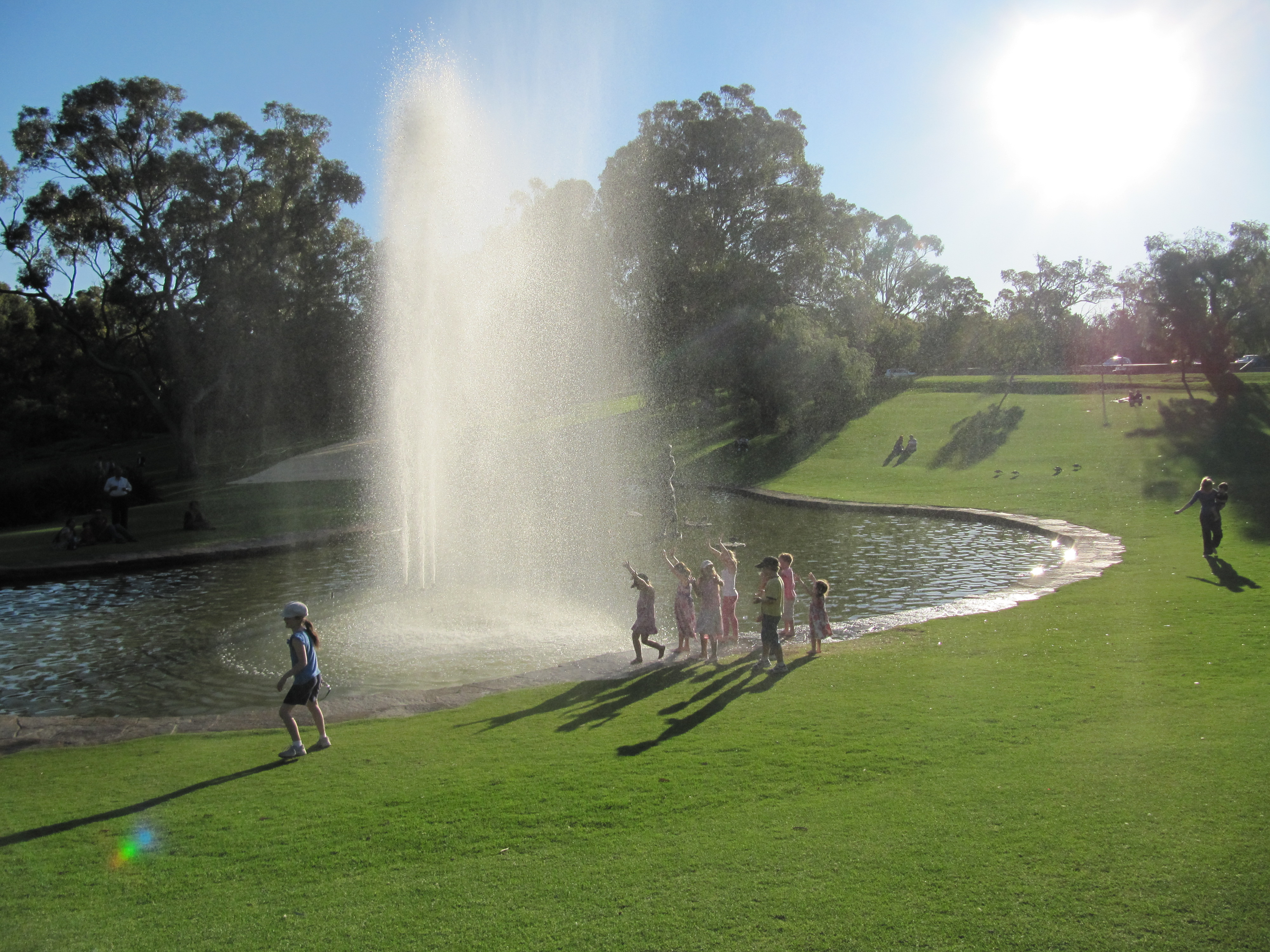

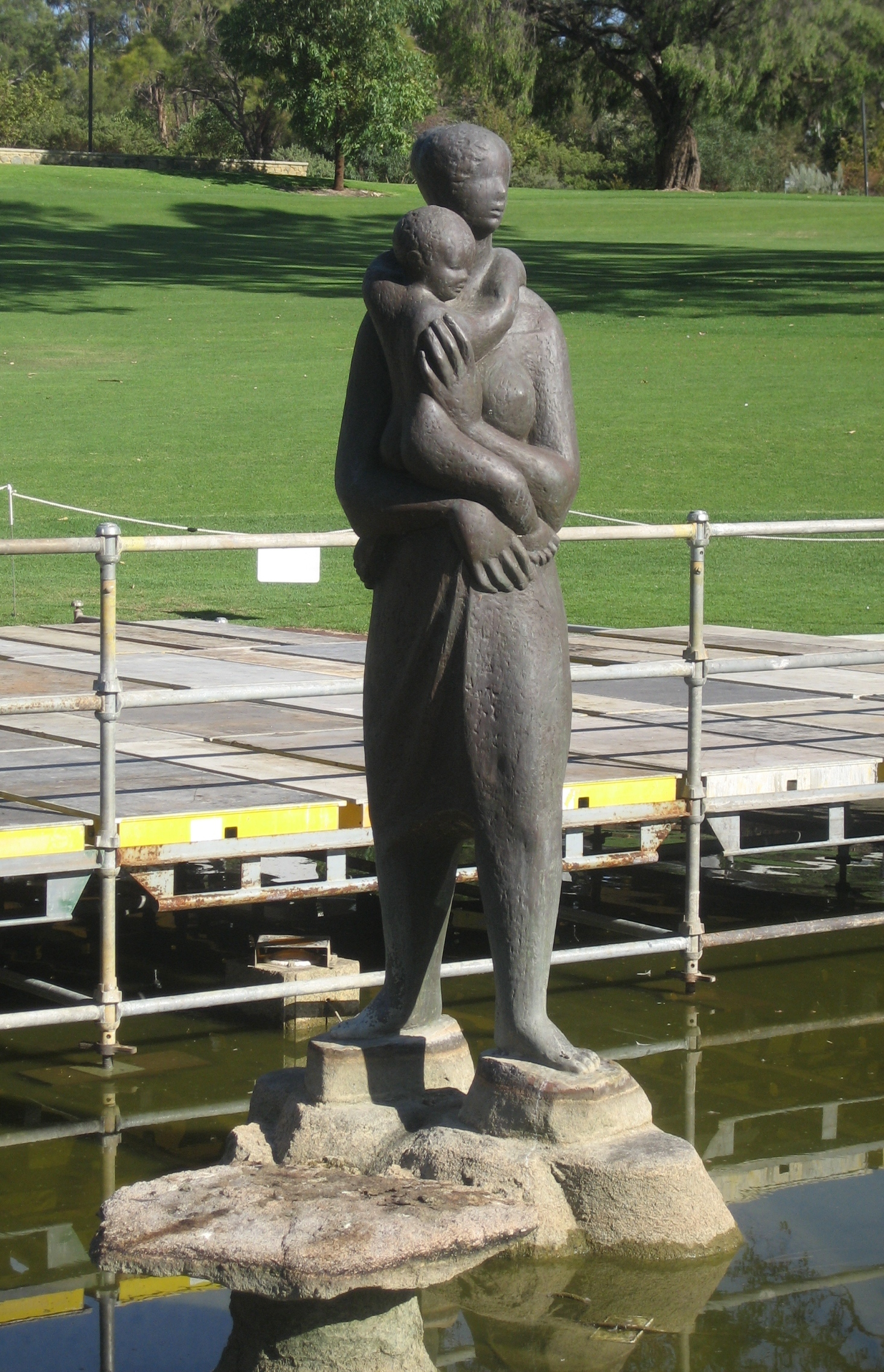

In the early 1960s there were moves to establish the memorial, with planning beginning in 1963. The centrepiece, a 2.7-metre-tall (9 ft) bronze statue designed by Margaret Priest, stands on a stepping stone in an ornamental lake and is surrounded by five other stones and fountains. The statue was unveiled, and the fountain in the lake was officially started, by the Governor of Western Australia on 14 January 1968. The opening ceremony was hosted by the King's Park Board members and chairman, and a large group of attendees heard a speech by Geoffrey Summerhayes, the architect, which described his plan for the memorial as, "the figure of a woman apparently mounting a stream by stepping stones … stepping stones of progress".

The area around the memorial was upgraded in 1999, and the Centenary of Western Australian Women's Suffrage Memorial was added nearby. At that time the large waterfall was removed.
