= Reginald Summerhayes =

- Born: 19 February 1897; Claremont, Western Australia
- Died: 28 November 1965 (aged 68); Perth, Western Australia
- Occupation: Architect
- Family: Edwin Summerhayes (father); Geoffrey Edwin Summerhayes (son)

Reginald Summerhayes (1897–1965) was a Western Australian architect, Military Cross recipient, and president of the Australian Institute of Architects.

== Biography ==
Reginald Summerhayes was born 19 February 1897 at Bernard Street, Claremont to the architect Edwin Summerhayes and his wife Florence. Summerhayes graduated from Scotch College in 1913 as dux, and won an exhibition (scholarship), for Ancient Greek and Latin, to the University of Western Australia (UWA). There, he studied engineering, as there were no architecture courses available at the time. Summerhayes excelled at his studies, winning the Neil McNeil Scholarship in engineering in 1914, and in the subsequent year's exams he earned a distinction in Engineering Drawing & Design.

In 1916, Summerhayes left his studies to fight in World War I. Unable to join the Australian forces due to his age, he travelled by ship to the United Kingdom, where he joined the Royal Engineers in March 1916. Summerhayes served until 1919, including deployment to France; he was awarded a Military Cross in 1918, presented at Buckingham Palace on his 21st birthday: The text of his citation included:

"He worked indefatigably both by day and night, frequently exposed to the heaviest fire, to establish a visual and telephonic system of communication for use during a raid. His system never failed for a moment, and its success was entirely due to his courageous and determined efforts."

In 1920, Summerhayes returned to his studies at UWA and graduated with a Bachelor of Science in Engineering in April 1921. Summerhayes then moved to Singapore and worked as an assistant architect at the Swan & Maclaren Group; by 1925, he was managing architect of the firm's Malay States branch at Kuala Lumpur.

Summerhayes returned to Perth in 1926, to join his father's architectural firm. In November 1927, he married Sheila Kathleen Durack at St Patrick's Church, West Perth. The following September their children, twins Eve and Geoffrey were born. His father Edwin retired in 1934, and as the 1930s depression ended, Summerhayes took on more commercial and public sector works.

Summerhayes became involved with the Royal Institute of Architects of Western Australia (RIAWA), first as secretary from 1931–1934, and later as president, elected March 1937. In 1939, he was primarily responsible for RIAWA starting The Architect, a journal that remained in publication.

Summerhayes returned to the military in World War II, in a non-active service role as a Lieutenant Colonel in the Australian Army. In the following years, his architectural business grew, and he founded Summerhayes & Associates in 1952. That same year, he was elected a Fellow of the Royal Institute of British Architects, in honour of his service to Western Australian architecture. In 1953 Summerhayes' son Geoffrey Edwin Summerhayes, who had also become an architect, joined his father's firm. Reginald Summerhayes died, aged 68, on 28 November 1965.

== Works ==
In the early years of his career, Summerhayes designed residential buildings in the Inter-War Old English architectural style, such as the 1929 Georgian-style residence in Dalkeith, for Malcolm Plaistowe, the 1936 "Interlaken" house in Mosman Park for Mrs I.B. Rowley, and his own 1929 house at the southern corner of Stirling Highway and Wilson Street in Claremont.

In the mid-1930s he worked on the Physics and Chemistry Science Building at UWA, opened in 1935, new council chambers for the Town of Claremont, whose earlier chambers were built by his father; and in a supervisory role, the 1936 Colonial Mutual Life Assurance Society Building (on the corner of St Georges Terrace and Sherwood Court), and its 1937 11-storey companion building, Lawson Flats on Sherwood Court.

By 1937, Summerhayes had been successful in various architectural competitions, including flats and professional chambers for UWA, Wagin's town hall, Perth Dental Hospital, Lake Karrinyup Country Club, and in conjunction with sculptor Edward Kohler, an equestrian statue of King George V for Brisbane Town Hall. He designed church buildings in a Romanesque style, for the new buildings at Loreto Convent, Claremont in 1937, All Hallows' Church in Inglewood in 1938, and St Joseph's Catholic Church in Manjimup built 1953–55. Summerhayes also designed multiple hotels built in 1940, including Highway Hotel in Claremont, the Civic Hotel in Inglewood, and the Swanbourne Hotel.

== Legacy ==
Many of Summerhayes' buildings have been demolished, but the bell tower of Loreto Convent was relocated to William Street in 1992. The rebuilding and restoration project was performed by the Holmes à Court family company, Heytesbury Holdings, and supervised by Summerhayes's son Geoffrey.
