= HCF Insurance =

Australian health insurance company

Hospitals Contribution Fund of Australia
- Industry: Insurance
- Founded: 16 June 1932; 94 years ago
- Headquarters: Sydney, New South Wales, Australia
- Area served: Australia
- Key people: Mark Johnson (Chair); Sheena Jack (CEO)
- Products: Health insurance; Life insurance; Travel insurance; Pet insurance
- Revenue: ▲ A$4.182 billion (2025)
- Net income: ▼ A$195.3 million (2025)
- Total assets: ▲ A$2.835 billion (2025)
- Website: hcf.com.au

The Hospitals Contribution Fund of Australia, commonly referred to as HCF, is an Australian private health insurer headquartered in Sydney, New South Wales. Founded in 1932, it has grown to become one of the country's largest combined registered private health fund and life insurance company. HCF is the third-largest health insurance company by market share, and is the largest not-for-profit health fund in Australia.

HCF provides private health insurance cover for a full range of health cover including pet insurance, travel insurance and life insurance.

== History ==
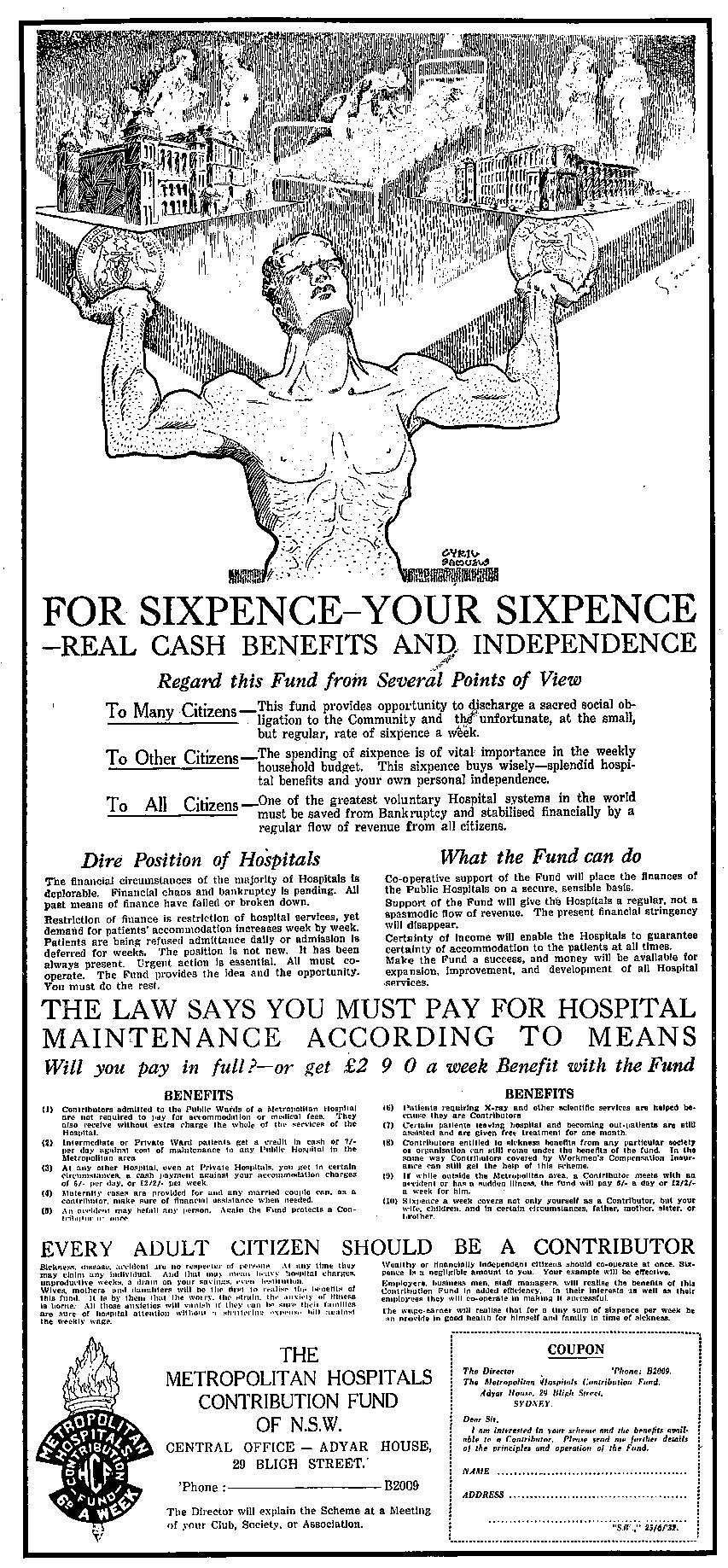
HCF's first-ever advertisement on Wednesday 22 June 1932 on The Sydney Morning Herald.

In 1893, the Hospitals Saturday Fund of NSW (HSF) was established by Frank Grimley to serve this purpose. Money was raised by conducting a one-day-a-year drive to collect funds from the public and from businesses. These collections were then distributed among participating hospitals. In 1900, HSF introduced individual subscription hospital insurance, where contributors and their families paid a regular weekly sum to the fund.

=== The early years 1932–1942 ===
In 1932, following negotiations between the Hospital Saturday Fund (HSF) and a newly created Hospital Commission of New South Wales, a new fund was created to better serve the community. The new fund – called the Metropolitan Hospitals Contribution Fund (MHCF) – was launched on 16 June 1932, with the Lord Mayor (Ald. S. Walder) presiding.

The fund's first office was established on the first floor of Adyar House (later the Savoy Building and now demolished) in Bligh Street. At the end of the first two years of operations, it had enrolled more than 100,000 contributors drawn from 3,290 employment groups and some 5,000 honorary agents, although its area of operations was confined to about 50 square miles (100 km^{2}) around the City of Sydney. Contributions were 6d. a week (family) and 3d. a week (single). Benefits paid for hospitalisation in participating hospitals were £2/9/- per week.

Further rapid growth in the Fund's business led to a need for more accommodation and, in December 1934, the Fund removed to offices on the fourth floor of the new Asbestos House in York Street, Sydney. By 30 June 1935, the fund had 156,230 contributors on record. The opening of additional offices on the ground floor of the same building in 1937 set the pattern for HCF's contributor services offices.

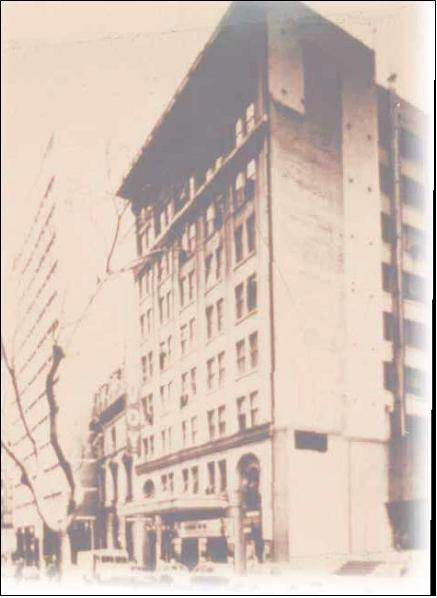
HCF's first office was established in Adyar House in Bligh Street, Sydney, which later became the Savoy Building.

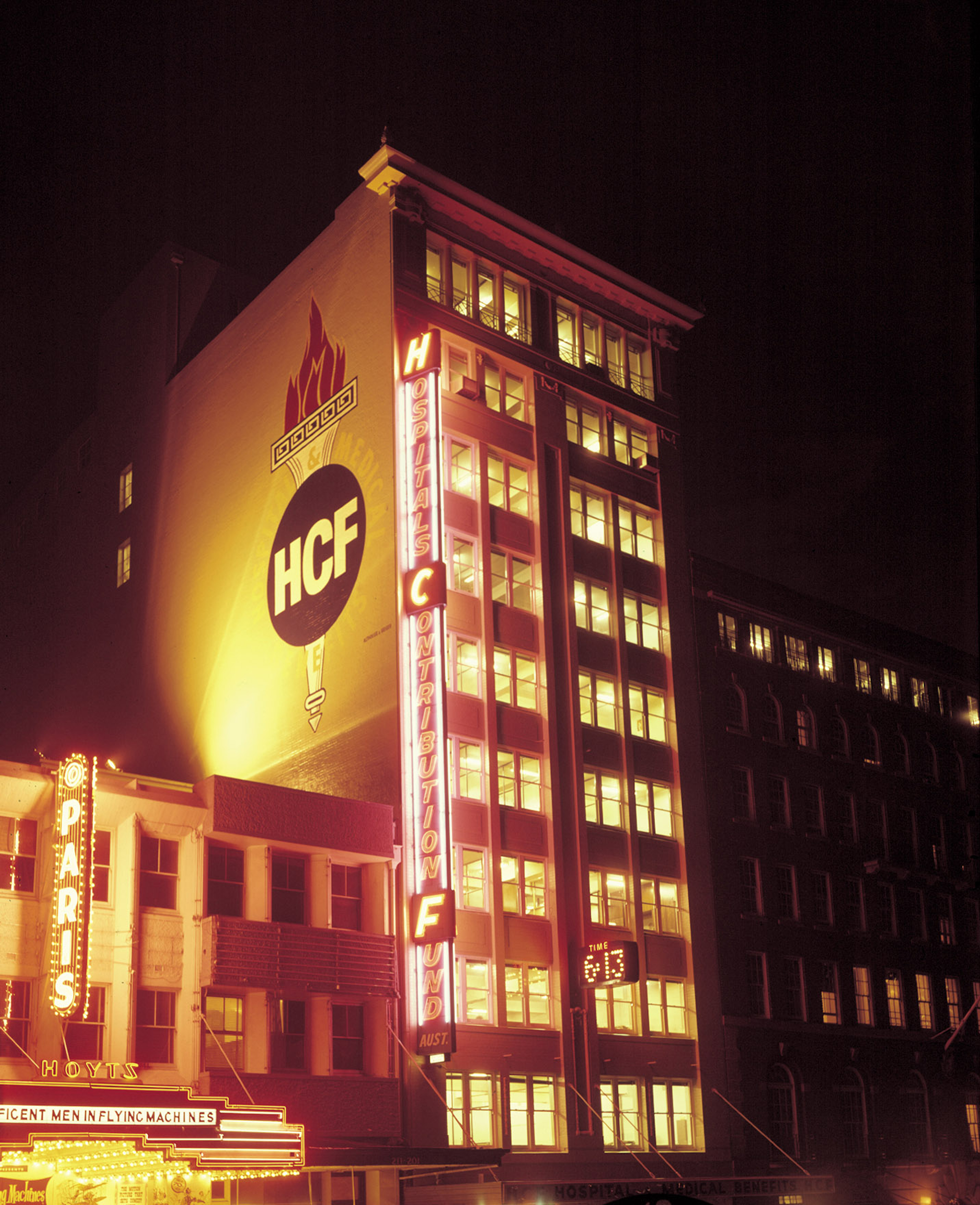
The Catton Building in Liverpool Street, Sydney was purchased by HCF, who then took up residence in 1953.

In 1941, HCF moved to its first "home-of-its-own" in Hamilton Street. This building, duly named MHCF House, has now long since been demolished to make way for yet another high rise development in Sydney's booming commercial area. The purchase of its own offices was a forerunner to the conclusion of the Fund's first decade of operations during which the original staff of 10 increased to 75 and annual revenue had grown from £31,757 at 30 June 1933 to £364,180 at 30 June 1942.

=== The war years and beyond 1942–1952 ===
The 1942–52 decade of the Fund's development began at the height of the World War II. During these years MHCF House was never left unattended, day or night, in compliance with National Emergency Services regulations. An air raid shelter was built in the basement and the entire male staff of 24 was formed into a voluntary patrol to protect the building. On the night of 7 June 1942 when Japanese submarines shelled Sydney, a contributor in Bellevue Hill was struck by a shell fragment and admitted to St Vincent's Hospital. In due course a claim (No. H711683) was paid in respect of this injury.

Despite many difficulties of the World War II years, including the severe drain on manpower resources and the cessation of many employment groups, the Fund's revenues continued to grow, indicating the high value now placed by the community on an equitable and efficient hospital insurance system. By 30 June 1945, it had an income of £440,000. In 1945, the Fund extended its area of operations to cover the whole of New South Wales. In 1946, due approval was obtained from the State Government and the name of the Fund was changed to the Hospitals Contribution Fund of NSW. A scheme for a medical benefits fund, to provide insurance against the costs of medical services, had been envisaged by then MHCF and members of the medical profession in 1939 but had been deferred because of the war. However, in 1947, under the sponsorship of the medical profession, the Medical Benefits Fund of Australia (MBF) was formed, The well-established HCF accepted its invitation to be managing agents for the new fund.

By early 1947, HCF's annual income was well past the £500,000 mark and its cover extended to more than 1,250,000 people in NSW. To accommodate continued rapid growth, HCF purchased the Catton Building at 199 Liverpool Street, in January 1950. Meanwhile, in 1952, income had risen to £671,633 – a twenty-fold increase in 20 years – and grants to public hospitals and medical charities exceeded £100,000 for the year.

=== The years of Commonwealth support 1952–1962 ===
The introduction of the National Health Scheme by the Commonwealth Minister for Health (Sir Earle Page) in 1952 marked the beginning of a new era for health insurance in Australia. Previously conducted on a private basis, voluntary health insurance funds were now required to be registered under the National Health Act in order to pay the additional benefits now provided by the Commonwealth. HCF decided to seek registration under the Act, which was duly granted and the Fund's total disbursements of the Commonwealth hospital benefit of 4/- a day from 1 January 1952 (the start of the Scheme) to 30 June 1952 amount to £34,073.

In 1953, following increases in hospital charges, the HCF family contribution rate was raised to 3/- a week which provided for a weekly hospital benefits of £12/12/- and the age limit on membership was abolished. In 1957, at the end of 25 years' operations, HCF celebrated its silver anniversary with benefit payments for the year amounting to £3,170,408. By 1962, after 30 years of service, total benefits paid were £9,202,720.

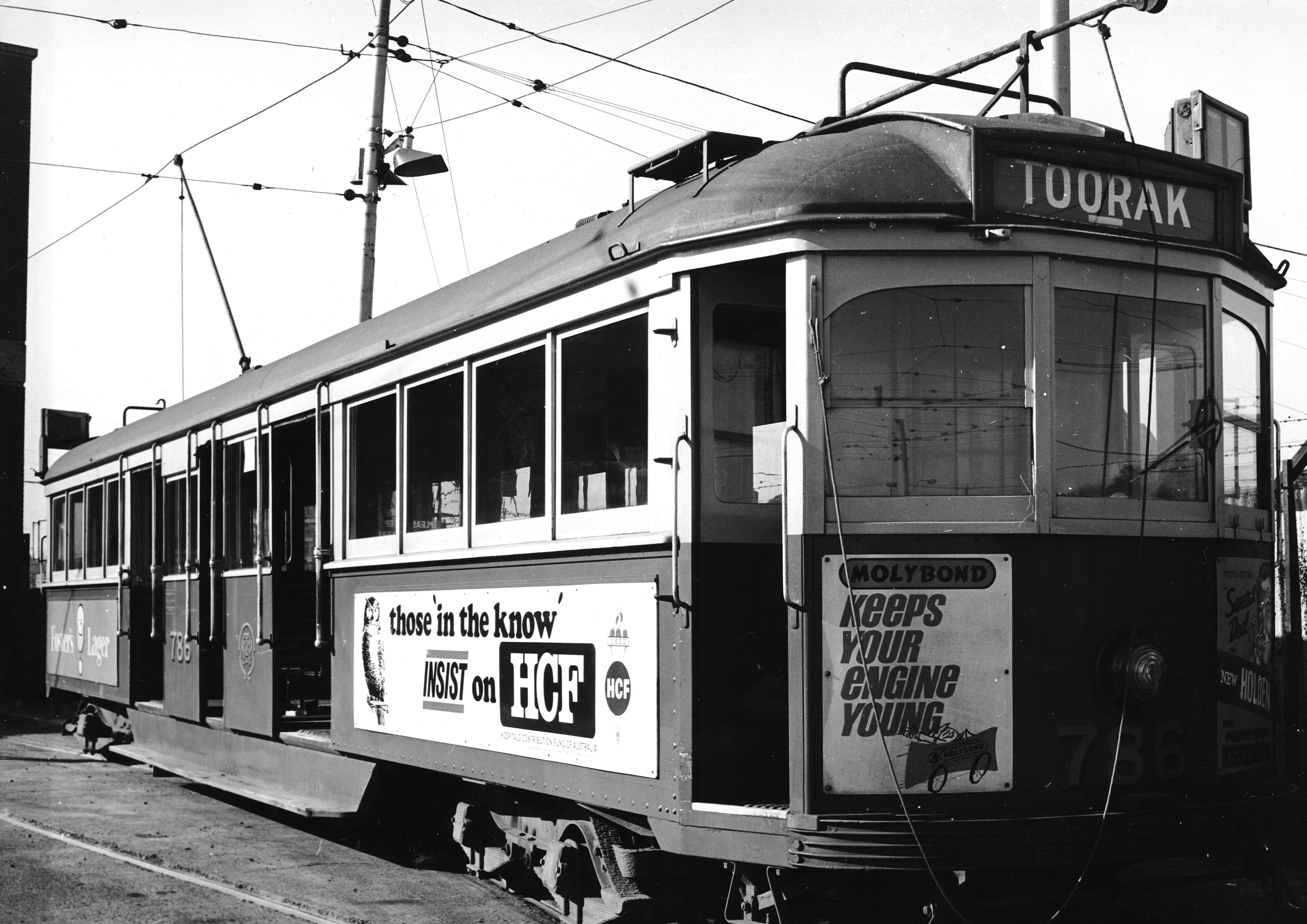
A Victorian Tram with HCF's ad in 1969 - just before it closing its business in Victoria in 1970, as a result of introducing National Health Act 1970 by the commonwealth government.

=== The growing years 1962–1972 ===
The commencement of HCF's fourth decade saw a major expansion of the Fund's activities. The decision was taken to end the joint management arrangements with the MBF which had begun in 1960, when HCF staff had moved to the MBF premises in George Street. As a consequence of increased competition, the fund extended its operations to include medical benefits after the Government approval. On 1 November 1963, HCF resumed independent operations from 199 Liverpool Street and launched its combined medical and hospital benefits plan.

In 1964 HCF upgraded its administrative procedures by installation of its own computer and introduced electronic data processing as an integral part of its operations. The Fund continued to expand its branch network throughout metropolitan and country areas. It waived, at its own expense, transfer conditions when higher hospital tables were introduced.

In 1965, HCF extended its operations to Victoria as part of a plan to assist Fund contributors throughout Australia. New hospital tables were introduced. Branch transactions became a larger part of HCF's business, with three out of every five claims being presented over the counter at metropolitan and country branches.

By 1967, HCF had changed its name to the Hospitals Contribution Fund of Australia and started advertising under the new name. It had established branch offices in Melbourne, Brisbane and Hobart. These were the first links in the chain of interstate contributor service offices, which was completed in 1969 with branches in all States of the Commonwealth. Interstate operations were maintained until changes in the National Health Act in 1970, when the Fund decided to limit its activities and service to NSW, the ACT and Northern Territory.

=== The expanding years 1972–1982 ===
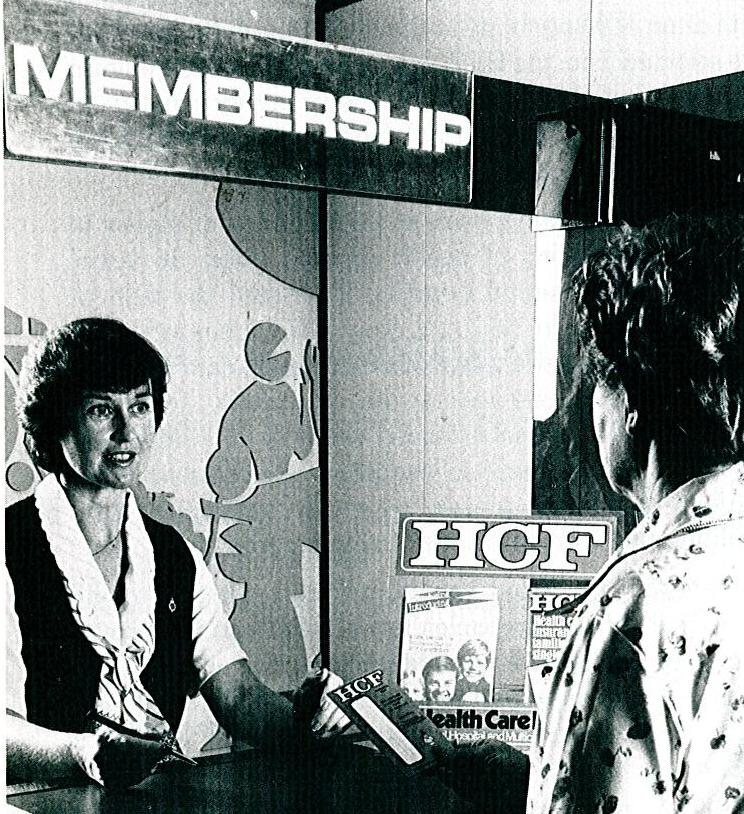
A HCF staff member is serving a customer in early 1980s.

In October 1974, HCF, in association with MBF, challenged the refusal by the then Commonwealth Minister for Social Security to approve increases in contribution rates which the funds required to meet benefit payments on higher public hospital charges. The case was heard in the NSW Supreme Court, the fund's challenge was successful and the new rates were introduced in accordance with the original submissions.

The Commonwealth Government's Medibank (now Medicare) fund was established in 1975, and provided medical benefits of 85% of the Schedule Fee for everyone in the community under an income tax levy system. (Medical services coverage from 1 July 1975, followed by hospital coverage from 1 October 1975). This provided HCF and all other Australian health funds with a government run competitor whose services were compulsory.

To maintain its community service role in this new environment, HCF introduced its Multicover plan from 1 July 1975, providing cover for the medical "gap" (the difference between the Medibank benefit and the Schedule Fee) and for a wide range of other health care services, such as dental, optical, physiotherapy, home nursing and overseas health care, which were not covered by Medibank.

In November 1975, the head office staff completed their occupation of HCF's new premises at 403 George Street Sydney, which have since been extended to accommodate additional staff and facilities needed to provide the Fund's expanding services.

Towards the end of 1977, HCF took court action to appeal to the Administrative Appeals Tribunal against the refusal by the then Minister for Health to approve a contribution increase required to meet higher provider charges. Once again the Fund was successful.

HCF Life Insurance Pty Ltd., a wholly owned subsidiary company, was established in January 1980.

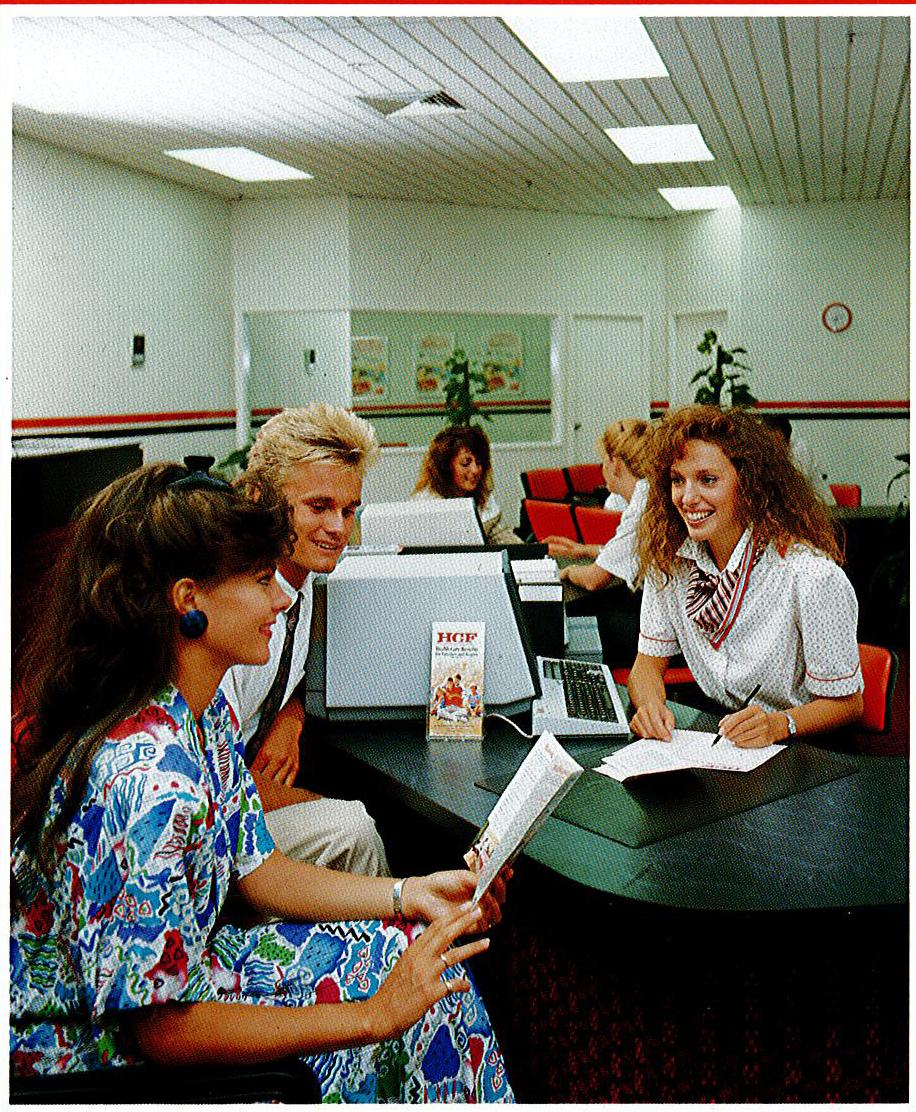
HCF members are served in the Pagewood Branch in 1987.

=== The challenging years 1982–1992 ===
In 1982 HCF celebrated its 50th anniversary. Its Annual Report reviewed its development since 1932.

In 1983 the Federal Government introduced Medicare (Medibank's replacement) to cover medical and public hospital treatment. Health insurers were prevented from paying medical benefits.

Like other registered health funds, HCF ceased to pay medical benefits on 1 February 1984 and its health insurance products started to focus on benefits outside the Medicare scope. HCF extended and was able to offer more than just hospital, ambulance and ancillary cover. It also offered a wide range of life insurance products and, as agents, travel insurance.

By the end of 1986 the HCF computer network linked every branch office with operational departments. The benefits for the member and staff are speedier membership and claim transactions. Full service agents operate at outlets in country areas where membership and claims may be lodged and processed.

HCF's first Dental Centre was opened in HCF House to provide members with dental treatment for most routine services on 3 November 1986.

=== The changing years 1992–2002 ===
The first HCF Eyecare Centre was opened in July 1992 in George Street, Sydney. This was soon followed by more centres around metropolitan Sydney.

In June 2000, HCF established The HCF Health and Medical Research Foundation. The Foundation is a not for profit charitable trust established to encourage medical research of all kinds and research and enquiry into the provision, administration and delivery of health services in Australia for the benefit of HCF contributors and the public generally.

On 1 July 2000, the Australian Government introduced Lifetime Health Cover initiative, encouraging younger people to take out health insurance. HCF's membership increased by 35% to 336,499 members by the end of 30 June 2001

In 2001 the HCF Regional & Rural Oral Health Program was launched in order to provide its members in the regional and rural areas of NSW quality dental service on a low-cost basis. By the end of 2007, it had expanded to include Queensland and Victoria members with over 1,500 participating dentists across these states. By 2010 there were over 3,000 providers registered on the HCF Oral Health program across Victoria, Queensland, ACT, South Australia and regional NSW. It has been treating over 65,000 HCF members each year.

=== 2002 and beyond ===
In November 2002 HCF acquired IOR Australia Pty Ltd, a registered health benefit organisation previously owned by IOR Friendly Society Limited. IOR had most of its policy holders in Victoria, Queensland and South Australia.

In early 2007 HCF was caught providing personal information of its clients to McKesson Asia Pacific to use for promotional purposes. While many clients and the general public were not satisfied with the decision, ultimately the New South Wales Privacy Commissioner judged that HCF had not breached the Privacy Act 1988.

On 28 August 2008, the Board of Manchester Unity Australia Limited announced it had signed a Merger Implementation Deed (MID) in relation to a proposal for a $256 million merger with HCF. Manchester Unity members agreed to HCF merger on 15 December 2008. Manchester Unity became a wholly owned subsidiary of HCF on 24 December 2008. Manchester Unity ceased to be a registered health insurer under the Act immediately prior to 30 June 2011.

On 1 November 2021 HCF merged with RT Health In 2025, HCF was named Australia's "Most Trusted Brand in Private Health Insurance" at the Roy Morgan Trusted Brand Awards. The next year, HCF extended its partnership with Netball Australia through 2027, supporting initiatives focused on women's health and participation in sport.

== Social responsibility ==
HCF supports and contributes back into the community through a number of charities: Jeans for Genes Day, Motor Neurone Disease, World Retina Day, Pink Ribbon Day and the National Breast Cancer Foundation.
