= Healthy Investment =

British mutual friendly society

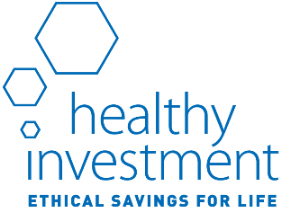
- Abbreviation: HI
- Formation: 25 August 1835
- Registration no.: 109994
- Headquarters: 2 The Old Court House, Tenterden Street, BL9 0AL
- Location: Bury, Greater Manchester
- Region served: United Kingdom
- Services: Ethical savings and investments
- Website: www.healthyinvestment.co.uk
- Formerly called: The Rechabite Friendly Society

Healthy Investment is a British mutual friendly society that provides a range of ethical With-profits savings and investment products. It was originally formed in 1835 as Independent Order of Rechabites, and traded until 2004 as The Rechabite Friendly Society. As of 2018 it had more than 100,000 members and looked after over £115m of members' money.

== History ==
On 25 August 1835 a small group of men, already committed to the total abstinence of alcohol, met in Mrs Meadowcroft's Temperance Hotel, Bolton Street, Salford in order to discuss a friendly society for those who had "signed the pledge" and abstained from alcohol. From its first procession on New Year's Day in 1836 the organisation grew rapidly with local groups known as "tents" being formed throughout the country. In 1842 contributions of two shillings per year for the under 35s entitled them to £5 death benefit and a further penny a week provided them with a sickness benefit of two shillings and six pence.

In 1999 the Society, by now known as The Rechabite Friendly Society, modernised and centralised its various local groups and regions into one Manchester-based Head Office. In 2004 the Society developed further and opened its membership to include temperate members or those who "enjoy alcohol in moderation". Today The Rechabite Friendly Society trades as Healthy Investment.

The Society's head office is now based in Bury, Greater Manchester.

== Current Products ==
Tax Exempt Savings Plans, Standard Savings Plans, Investment Bonds, Individual Savings Accounts (ISA), Junior ISAs and Child Trust Funds.

== Ethical Investment ==
The society specialises in providing ethical savings and investment products. It remains true to its founders' principles and avoids direct investment in companies in alcohol, arms and tobacco industries and in gambling and pornography providers. This is actively managed by Investec.

== Regulation ==
Healthy Investment is regulated by the Financial Conduct Authority and the Prudential Regulation Authority. Its members are covered by the Financial Services Compensation Scheme (FSCS) which guarantees investors 100% of all their investment with the Society without limit.

Healthy Investment is a member of the Association of Financial Mutuals.
