= William Turnbull Leach =

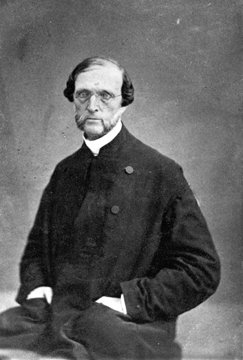
- Born: March 1, 1805; Berwick-upon-Tweed, England
- Died: October 13, 1886 (aged 81); Montreal, Quebec

William Turnbull Leach (March 1, 1805 – October 13, 1886) was a Canadian clergyman and academic.

Born in Berwick-upon-Tweed, England, the son of Robert Leach and Elizabeth Turnbull, Leach was educated in Berwick-upon-Tweed, Stirling, and received a Master of Arts degree from the University of Edinburgh. He was licensed as a minister of the Church of Scotland and emigrated to Upper Canada in the 1830s. Rejecting the Church of Scotland, he was ordained in the Church of England in 1843 and was the first incumbent of Montreal's St George's Church. In 1854, he was appointed a canon of Christ Church Cathedral. In 1865 he was named domestic chaplain to the bishop and an archdeacon.

From 1846 to 1853, he started teaching at McGill College (later McGill University) as a professor of classical literature and lecturer in mathematics and natural philosophy. From 1853 to 1872, he was a lecturer in logic, rhetoric, and moral philosophy. From 1872 to 1883, he was the Molson professor of English language and literature. From 1846 to 1886, he was a fellow and vice-principal, and from 1853 to 1886, he was the dean of the Faculty of Arts.
