= North Adelaide Post Office =

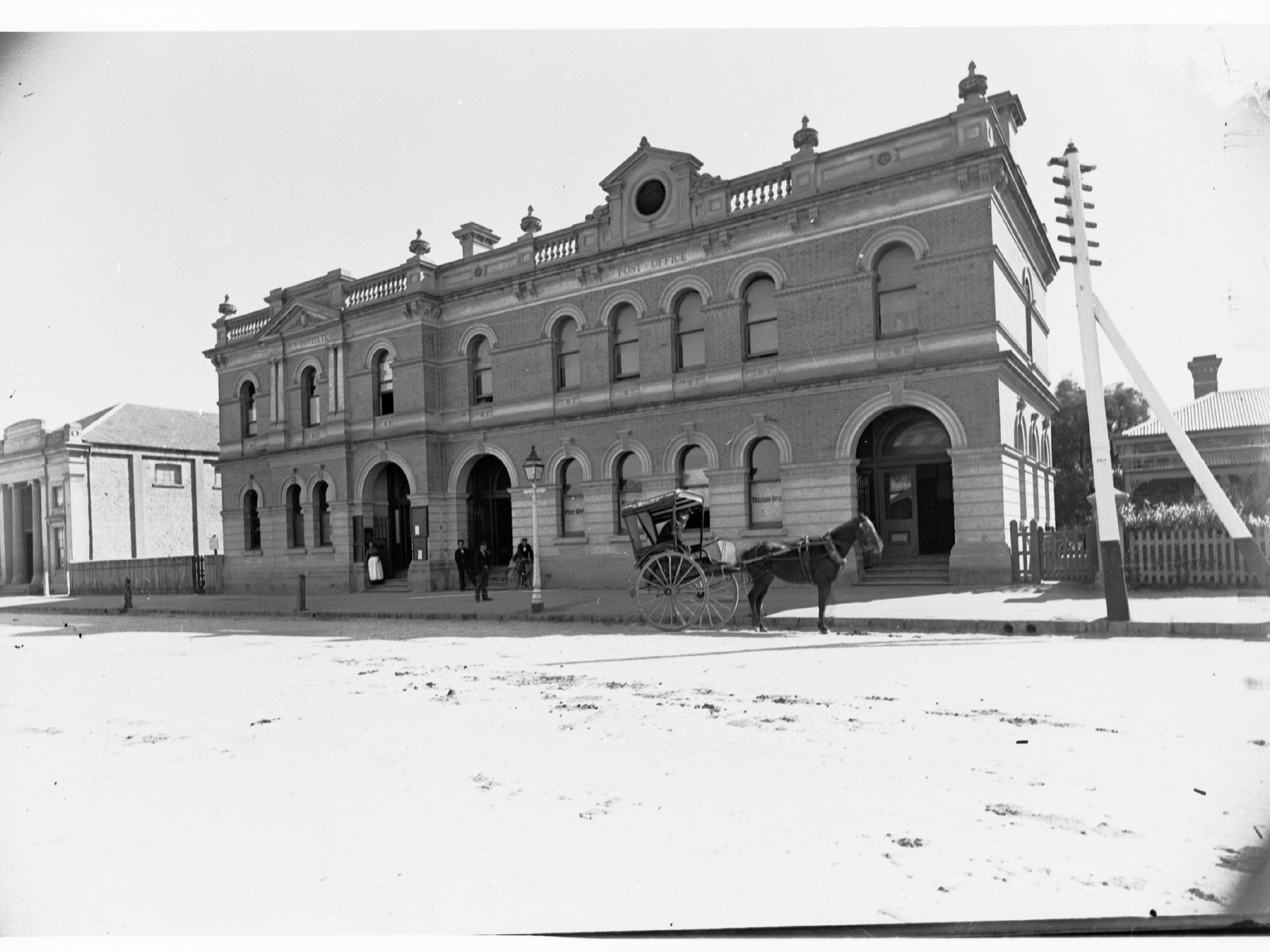
- The building in 1890

- Location within South Australia
- 34.9060°S 138.5940°E
- Location: 166 Tynte Street, North Adelaide, South Australia, Australia

Commonwealth Heritage List
- Official name: North Adelaide Post Office
- Type: Listed place (Historic)
- Designated: 8 November 2011
- Reference no.: 106136

North Adelaide Post Office is a heritage-listed post office at 166 Tynte Street, North Adelaide, South Australia, Australia. It was added to the Australian Commonwealth Heritage List on 8 November 2011.

== History ==
The North Adelaide Post Office was constructed in 1883-4 as part of a larger integrated building complex comprising the post and telegraph office, telephone exchange, residence and the North Adelaide Institute and hall. The funds for the construction of the Institute and hall were raised by public subscription, and these buildings were designed by Edward J. Woods and constructed by R. C. Rees for £3,470. The foundation stone for the North Adelaide Institute was laid by the Governor Sir William Robinson on 10 September 1883. The Institute and hall were opened on 18 April 1884 and the post and telegraph office opened on 1 November 1884. The post office portion of the building originally accommodated the postal, telegraphic and telephonic departments, as well as an upper floor residence for the postmaster.

Rooms were added to the rear of the Institute hall in 1885. A single-storey extension of two bays was added to the western end of the Institute component in matching arcaded mode sometime after 1911.

In c. 1975, a single-storey addition was built to the east and rear of the original building, including a PO box lobby and room, new back offices and van bay. This work included the concealment of a single ground floor bay on the east elevation and the conversion of the associated window to a door. The original timber picket fence fronting this section of the site was demolished by this stage or as part of these works.

A refurbishment of retail area and telegraph office including re-orientation of counter area took place in the 1980s or 1990s. The post-1911 single-storey extension on the western end was demolished sometime after 1989.

Details of later Institute alterations are not known other than the Institute was highly intact internally until recently and has now been adapted by the Adelaide City Council for use by the North Adelaide Community Centre and Library

== Description ==
North Adelaide Post Office is at 166 Tynte Street, North Adelaide, comprising the whole of Lot F183523 A186.

The North Adelaide Institute and Post Office is unique through being a combined cultural institute and post office. The Institute was opened in 1883, the Post Office component in 1884. The building is referred to as the North Adelaide Institute and Post Office. With O'Connell Street, Tynte Street was among the principal public precincts in North Adelaide with a high street character. The new building was next to an imposing Rechabite Hall of 1855, near the Baptist Church, 1869–70, and opposite the North Adelaide Hotel of 1881–2.

The original double-storey building was in two facets, expressing the shared usage, with the Institute adopting a projecting frontage with an astylar breakfront, and the Post Office, set back by about 600mm, a symmetrical elevation in its own right. The two components were linked visually by a salmon-red brick front and side, a rusticated and moulded rendered dado on the ground floor, colonnaded fenestration and moulded cornices marking the ceiling and floor levels. A moulded parapet with an intermittent waisted balustrade ran along the top. Both components had central pediments, the Institute's topping the breakfront and superimposed across the parapet. The post office had a raised pediment over a panel. This panel was to have had an arch underneath, but was raised further to allow a complete roundel. The main entrances to the building - a single entrance to the Institute and two to the post office and telegraph office - were all set within recessed porches which were accessed through a moulded arched opening and slate steps. The post office side elevation continued the materials seen on the façade, with asymmetrical fenestration in a single upper window and tripartite window group below. The Institute's side elevation was left plain face brick on its upper level with an exposed stone wall on the ground floor, later opened to allow a two bay single-storey extension along Tynte Street, suggesting that it had always been planned as part of the original design (since demolished and the original form reconstructed).

== Condition and integrity ==
Externally, North Adelaide Institute and Post Office's intactness is high with regard to the original form, material and detail, despite rear and side additions constructed in 1975. These works had a minimal impact on the principal form and fabric of the original building when viewed from Tynte Street. They resulted in the concealment of one ground floor bay on the east side elevation and conversion of one ground floor window opening to a doorway. The original rendered dressings have been overpainted and the usual component of signage, handrails and external services have been added, but the fabric is otherwise intact. The integrity of the original fabric of the rear north elevation has been compromised at ground floor level by the additions and alterations, which have resulted in the complete demolition of walls to integrate the floor area.

Internally, the post office's intactness is relatively good throughout both levels of the building, particularly in relation to plan form, despite alterations to the ground floor planning in 1975 and general phases of wholesale refurbishment throughout.

Internally and externally the building would appear to be in sound structural condition, well maintained and in good condition. There is evidence of some lateral wall cracking in the first floor walls at the west end of the building and damp at the southeast corner. A small number of the window sashes require repair and maintenance.

== Heritage listing ==
North Adelaide Post Office was listed on the Australian Commonwealth Heritage List on 8 November 2011.

The North Adelaide Institute and Post Office was constructed in 1883-4 as part of a larger integrated building complex comprising the post and telegraph office, telephone exchange, residence and the North Adelaide Institute and hall. The complex reflects the joint efforts of the private and public sectors, resulting in a structure satisfying both community and public service requirements, and meeting the local desire for a library and cultural facility as well as up-to-date telegraphic and postal facilities. The post office has also played a prominent role in the affairs of North Adelaide and was one of a number of significant public buildings and structures erected in this period of prosperity and confidence in North Adelaide, the others being the Art Gallery, Mitchell Building, Jervois Wing of the Library, Public Baths, Rotunda and Torrens Weir. The North Adelaide Post Office is a rare example in the national context of a combined cultural centre, with its concert, meeting and library spaces, and post office. Typologically, North Adelaide Post Office demonstrates all of the archetypal characteristics of a combined postal and telegraphic facility with telephonic and residential components. The complex's substantial scale also assumes a major civic role in North Adelaide's high street and demonstrates the increased volume in communications of the period. Stylistically, the building is a handsome and deftly composed example of an Italianate public building with Free Romanesque overtones, skilfully combining a multiplicity of components. The broadly Italianate form, modulation and detail is also a harbinger of Federation architecture in Adelaide through introducing an exposed salmon-red brick facade and stilted windows with heavy architraves. The North Adelaide Post Office is a prominent and imposing building in the North Adelaide context, and is a strong visual element of Tynte Street which in turn is dominated by many fine nineteenth century buildings of robust character and appearance. The building's composition, with its massing, symmetry and use of fine salmon red brickwork, stonework, rendered dressings and mouldings, all combine to give the structure outstanding aesthetic appeal. The North Adelaide Post Office has been a prominent public institution in North Adelaide with a long and distinguished history within the local community of providing, and being the focus of, a number of diverse civic and cultural functions including post office, public hall and library. North Adelaide Institute and Post Office is associated with the pre-eminent Colonial architects Edward J. Woods and Charles Owen-Smyth whose styles are clearly evident in the final composition.

The significant components of North Adelaide Institute and Post Office include the 1883-5 fabric of the complex.
