= Geoffrey Edwin Summerhayes =

Australian architect (1928–2010)

Geoffrey Edwin Summerhayes, OAM (15 September 1928 – 22 September 2010) was an Australian architect, who was based in Perth, Western Australia. Summerhayes studied architecture at Princeton and was taught by Professor Jean Labatut. He was in the architecture industry for over 55 years, and in that time he mostly worked on residential properties such as the Cliff House, Coombe House and his own residence, known as the Summerhayes House. During 1967-1968 he was the President of the Royal Australian Institute of Architects (Western Australia). He died on 22 September 2010, at the age of 82.

== Works ==
The Coombe house designed by Summerhayes is located in Mosman Park, the house is also named the Cliff House for its cliff-top location situated above Freshwater Bay. Two distinctive features characterise this house as avant garde, the flat roof and interior planning based on functionality and living styles to create separate spaces for children and adults.

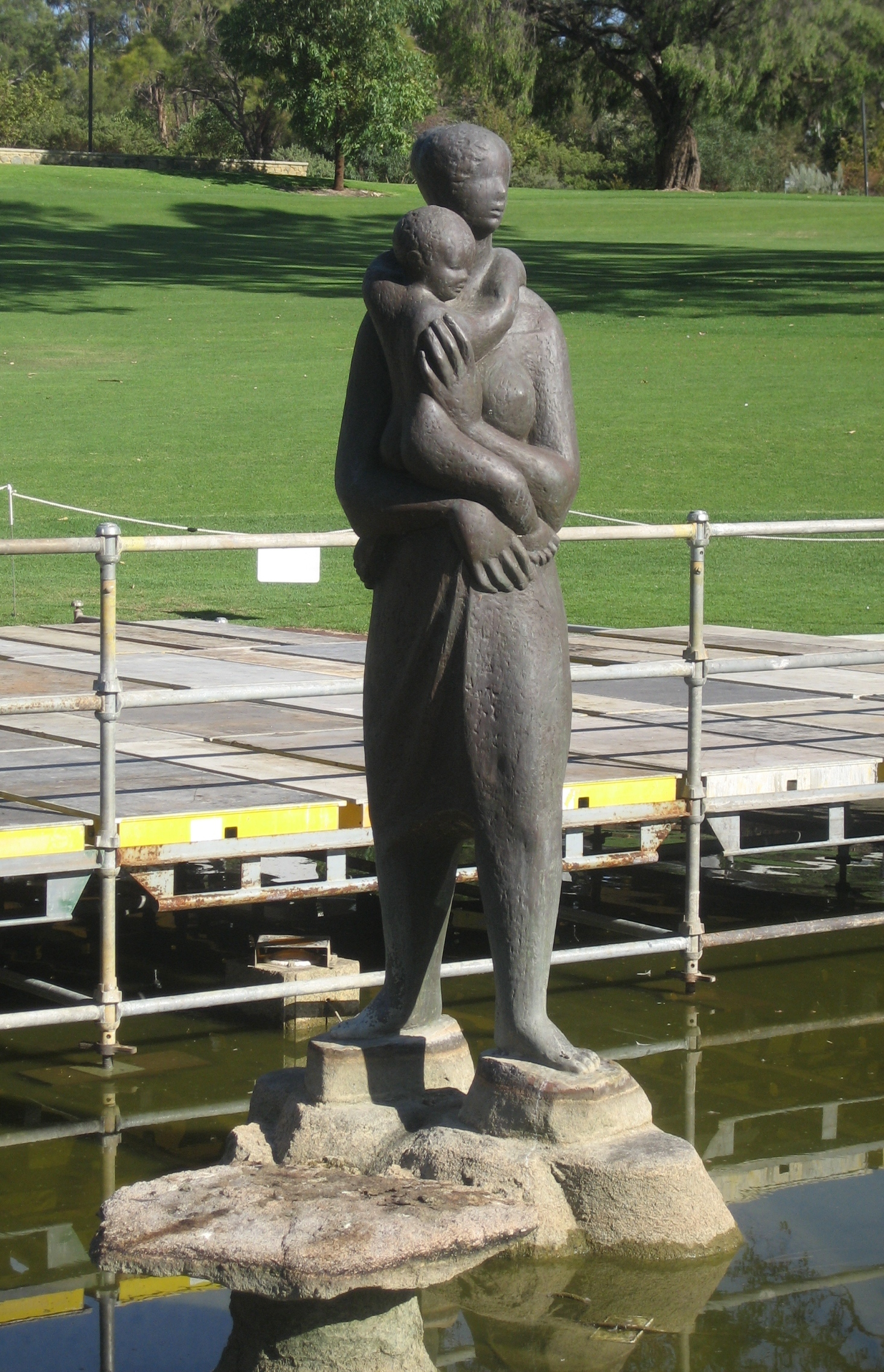
Pioneer Women's Memorial, Kings Park

The Wallace house was designed in the 1990s and completed in April 1995, it is located at The Esplanade, Peppermint Grove was commissioned by private clients wanted a Tuscan influence. Assisted by Jeff Meyers, Summerhayes produced a design of this house is influenced by the streets of Paris and also took inspiration from Tuscan villas. It is designed around a central courtyard, a prominent feature of villas.

His own residence was due to be demolished in the 60s and 70s and lacked a heritage listing, and the council wanted to clear the site. However, a private owner bought the structure. The residential property is still in its original condition due to the owner's wish to preserve the building. Every door of this house has full height. The Eaves extend out from the windows which make the interior space cool in Summer by blocking sunlight. The house has a round skylight above the toilet and shower room which is half exposed to the outdoors.

Summerhayes was appointed to produce a concept design for the Pioneer Women's Memorial at Kings Park, Western Australia. The large crowd that attended the opening in 1965 heard him describe the plan, and the speech was reported by the Women's Service Guilds in their publication The Dawn, "the figure of a woman apparently mounting a stream by stepping stones … stepping stones of progress".

== See also ==
- Edwin Summerhayes – grandfather of Geoffrey Edwin Summerhayes
- Reginald Summerhayes - father of Geoffrey Edwin Summerhayes
