= Edwin Summerhayes =

Australian architect (1868–1944)

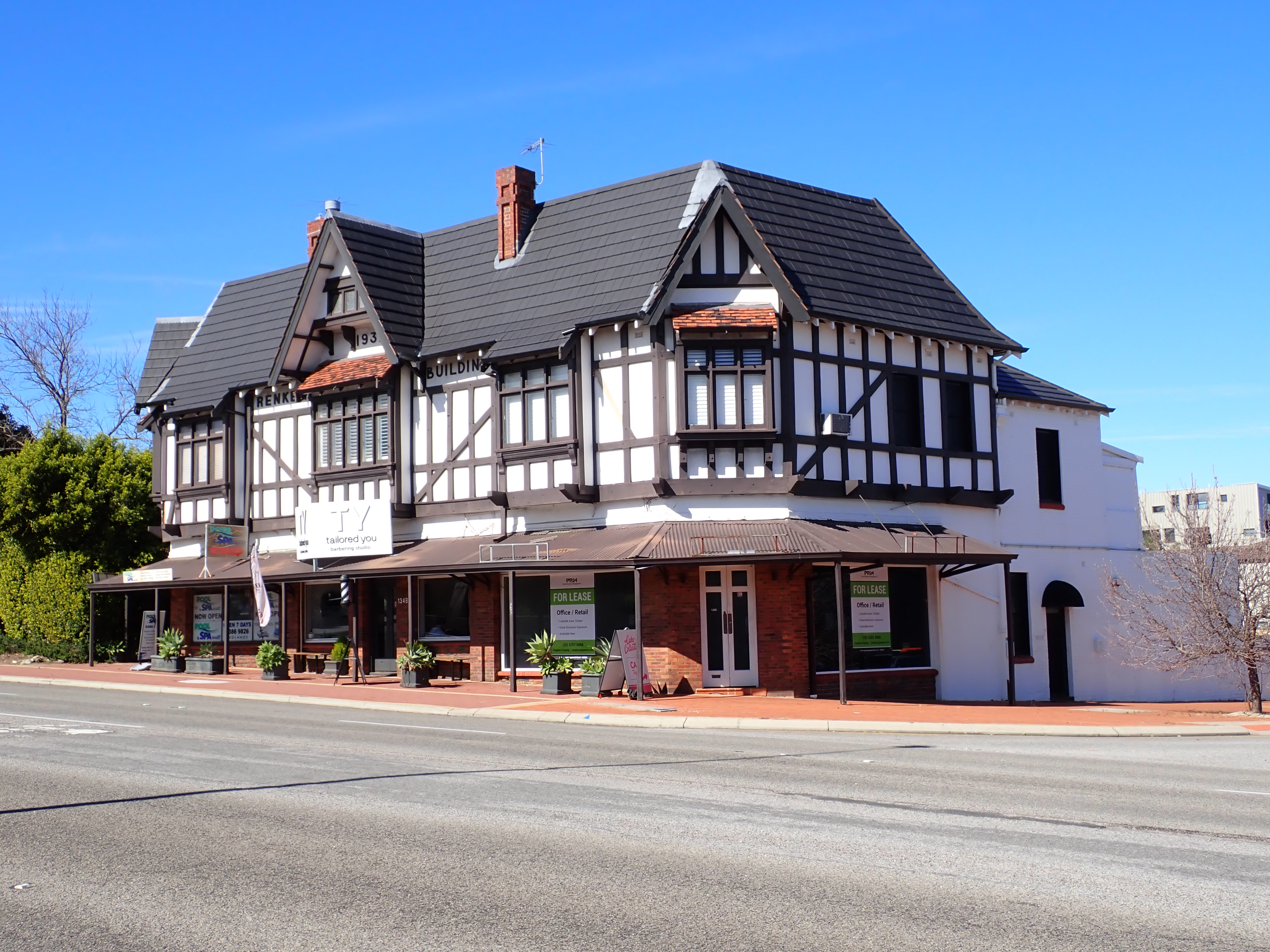
The state heritage listed Renkema Building in Nedlands, designed by Summerhayes

Edwin Summerhayes (1868–1944) was an Australian architect, founding member of the West Australian Institute of Architects, and a major in the 44 Infantry Battalion, serving in France from 1916 to 1917.

Summerhayes was born in 1868 in Greenwich, England. He attended Christ College London until he was sixteen, when his family moved to Australia. He was initially articled to James Hill in Adelaide, South Australia, and later William Pitt in Melbourne, Victoria. Summerhayes came to Western Australia in 1894, during the gold rushes, and set up an architectural practice in Coolgardie. He married Florence May Camm in Victoria in 1896, but had returned to Coolgardie by 1897, the year their son Reginald was born.

Within Coolgardie Summerhayes designed buildings such as the Victorian Turkish baths, the Jewish Synagogue, the Presbyterian Church, the Mechanics Institute and the Exhibition Building, but became known for his homestead and villa designs, which were built across Western Australia. He also designed Kobeelya in Katanning, and Rechabite Hall in Perth, his last significant building.

Summerhayes was one of the founding member of the West Australian Institute of Architects in 1896. He was also a Freemason, a member of the Claremont Municipal Council in 1904. He served as a major in the volunteer forces 11th Infantry Regiment in 1911, and in the 44 Infantry Battalion, deployed to France from 1916 to 1917.

Summerhayes was in partnership with Harold Boas in 1912, in Oldham Boas Ednie Brown and Partners. He later worked with his son until his retirement in 1934. Summerhayes died on 25 December 1944, and is buried at Guildford Cemetery.

== See also ==
- Geoffrey Edwin Summerhayes – grandson of Edwin Summerhayes
