= Tourism in Perth =

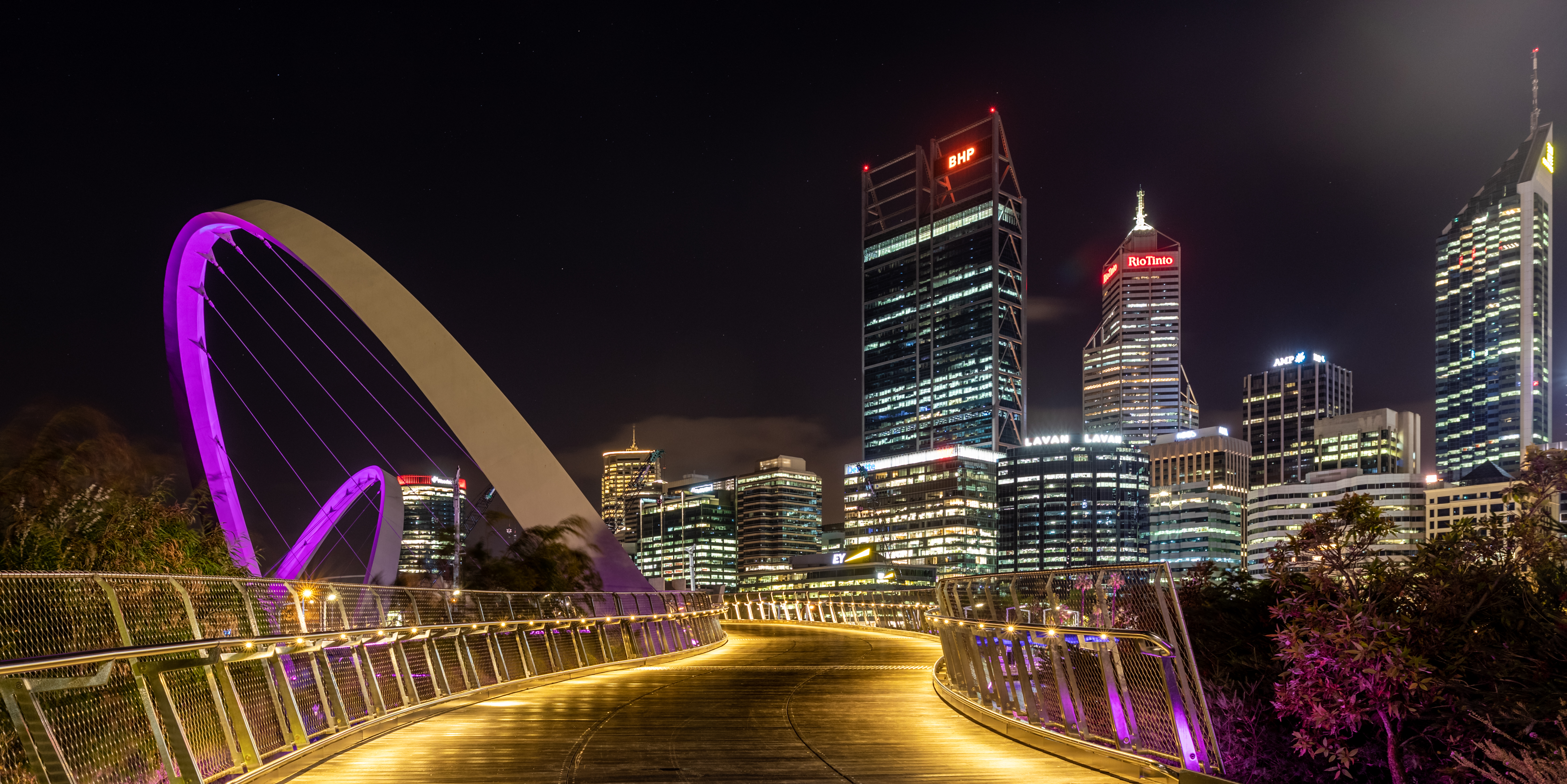
Perth at night, 2019

Tourism in Perth, the capital city of Western Australia, is an important part of the state's economy, contributing to the prosperity of businesses in the city and other regions of the state.

In the year ending March 2012, Perth received approximately 2.8 million domestic visitors and 0.7 million international visitors.

== Tourist information ==
Historically, most information about Perth and Western Australia was available in the form of pamphlets and brochures. (Note: The original government authority was the Western Australian Government Tourist and Publicity Bureau; it then became the Tourist Development Authority and subsequently the Department of Tourism.) However, a considerable amount of information is now available on the internet with a range of promotional websites from government and commercial organisations. Tourism Western Australia's website is the main government tourist information entry point, with information about Perth prominently featured.

== Arts, culture and science ==
=== Perth City ===
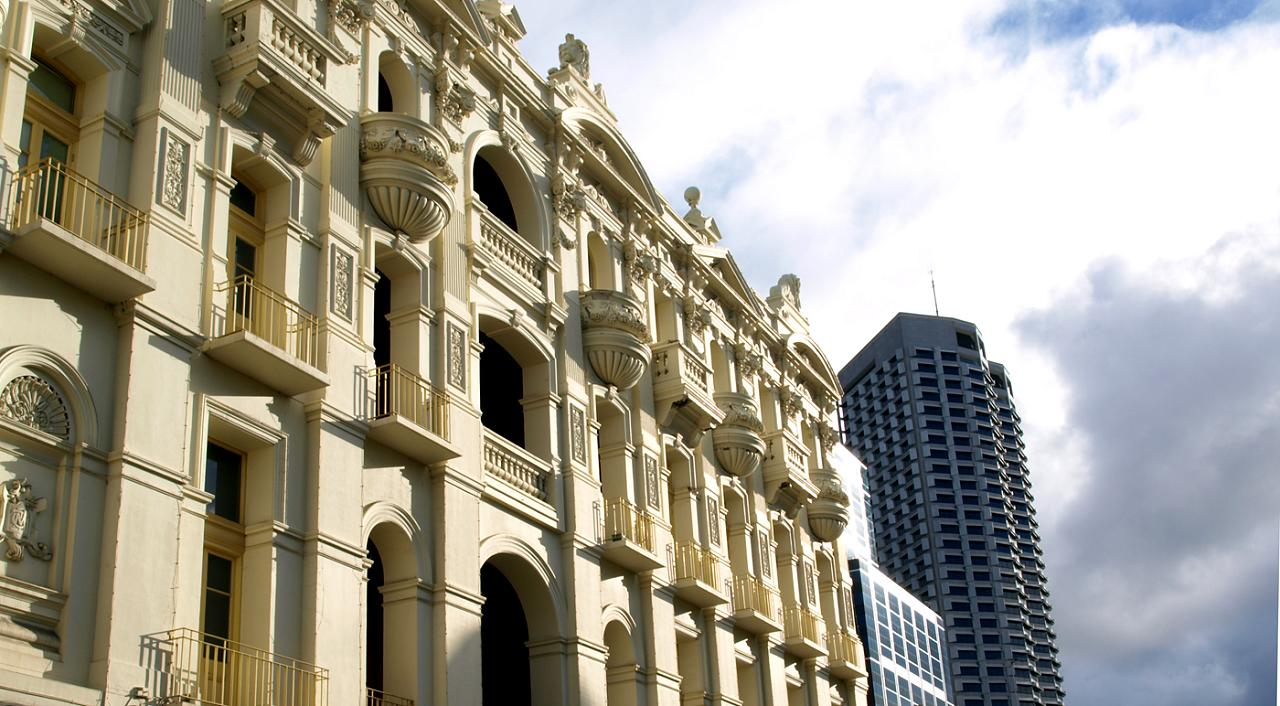
His Majesty's Theatre

The Perth Cultural Centre is a pedestrianised area to the north of the city centre, which includes the Art Gallery of Western Australia, the Western Australian Museum in Perth, the State Library of Western Australia, and the Perth Institute of Contemporary Arts (PICA). A walkway connects the Cultural Centre to Perth railway station.

The Scitech Discovery Centre is an interactive science museum with regularly changing exhibitions designed to inform and educate visitors on a wide range of science and technology-based subjects. Scitech also conducts live science shows and operates the Horizon planetarium located next to the Discovery Centre.

West Australian Opera is the principal opera company of Western Australia, based at His Majesty's Theatre in Perth.

The West Australian Symphony Orchestra (WASO) is an Australian symphony orchestra based in the city. Its concert venues include His Majesty's Theatre, the Perth Concert Hall, and the Riverside Theatre at the Perth Convention and Exhibition Centre, as well as other locations outside the city centre.

=== Fremantle ===
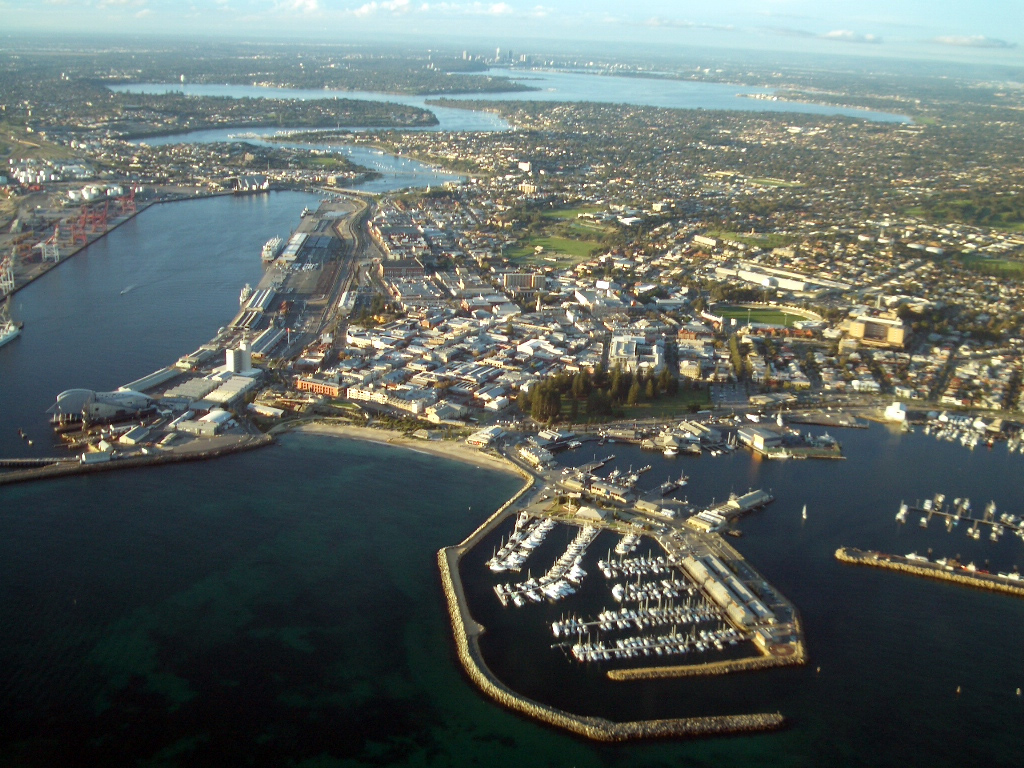
Aerial view of Fremantle and the Swan River

Fremantle Arts Centre is a multi-arts organisation offering a program of exhibitions, residencies, art courses, and music in a historic building at the heart of Fremantle, Western Australia. The building was constructed using convict labour between 1861 and 1868 and was used as a psychiatric hospital, initially called the Fremantle Lunatic Asylum, and later renamed as the Asylum for the Criminally Insane.

The Western Australian Maritime Museum, located on Victoria Quay, contains galleries with maritime themes such as the Indian Ocean, the Swan River, fishing, maritime trade and naval defence. The Western Australian Museum's Shipwreck Galleries is also located in Fremantle, on nearby Cliff Street. It is a specialist maritime archaeology and shipwreck conservation museum, housed in a 1850s-era Commissariat building. The museum also maintains a Museum-Without-Walls program via its wreck trail and wreck access programs at Rottnest Island. These trails appear at many places along the coast.

The Army Museum of Western Australia is a museum located in a historic artillery barracks in Fremantle. Established in 1977, the museum comprises several galleries that reflect the Army's involvement in Western Australia and the military service of Western Australians from the colonial period to the present day. The museum holds numerous significant items, including three Victoria Crosses.

=== Metropolitan Perth ===
The Zig Zag Cultural Centre is a multi-purpose facility in Kalamunda that includes a visitor centre, art gallery, meeting facilities, and the Zig Zag Cafe. The centre opened on 17 September 2011, to draw visitors to the history, culture and attractions within the Shire of Kalamunda.

The Perth Observatory is an astronomical observatory in Bickley. It is Australia's oldest continually operating observatory and Australia's only remaining state-government-operated astronomical observatory.

The RAAF Association's Aviation Heritage Museum in Bull Creek houses aircraft and artefacts relating to Western Australia's aviation history. A Lancaster bomber is open for pre-booked guided tours, and a standalone Merlin engine is run at midday every Saturday.

== Landmarks and historical sites ==
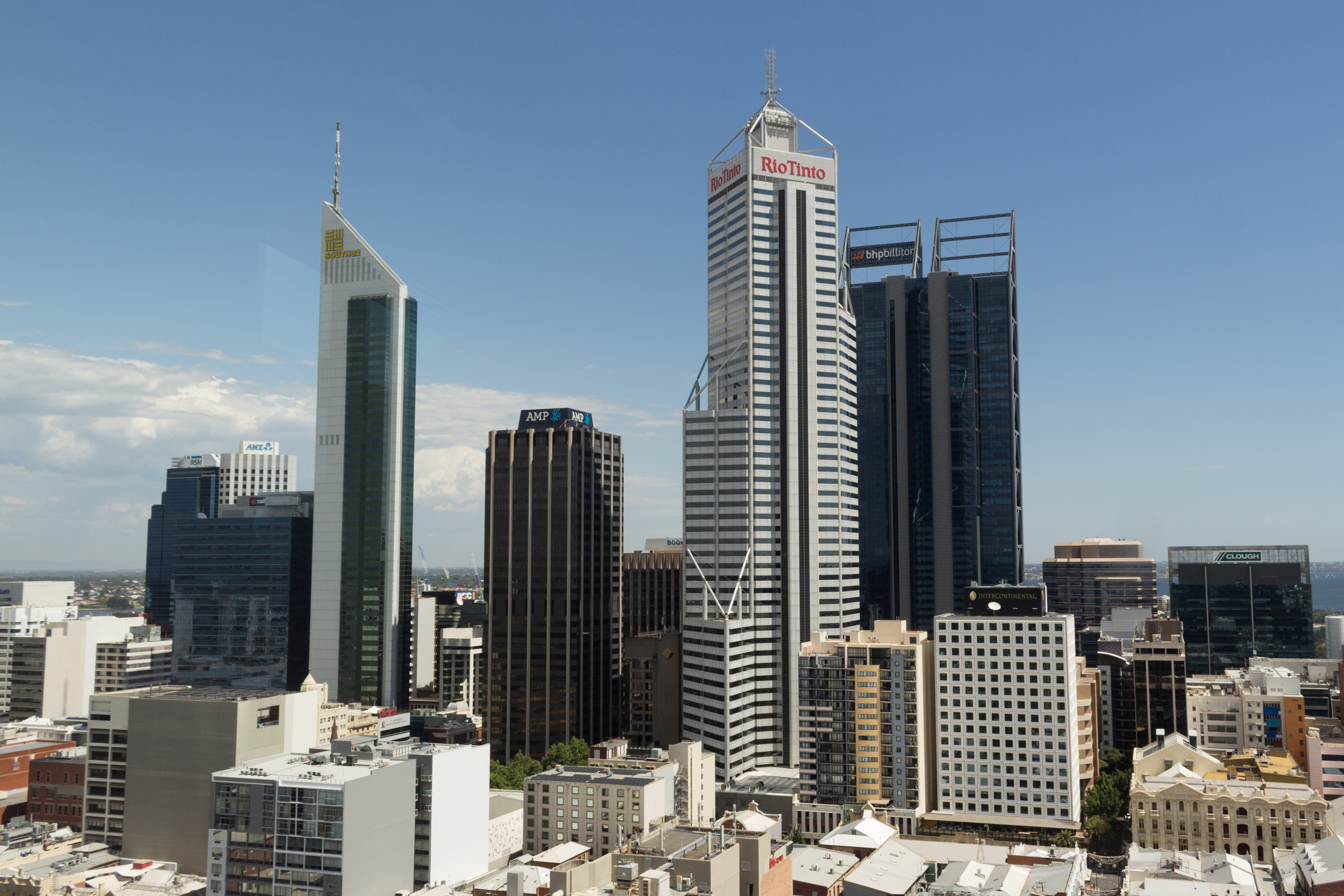
108 St Georges Terrace, Brookfield Place, AMP Building and Central Park in Perth, Western Australia in 2017

=== Perth city ===
The city skyline features several prominent skyscrapers overlooking Perth Water–the wide but shallow section of the Swan River between Perth, South Perth, the Causeway, and the Narrows Bridge. Central Park Tower is the tallest building in Perth, and the ninth-tallest building in Australia, whilst 108 St Georges Terrace has an unusual triangular cross-section. Brookfield Place incorporates several historic buildings within the precinct at its base.

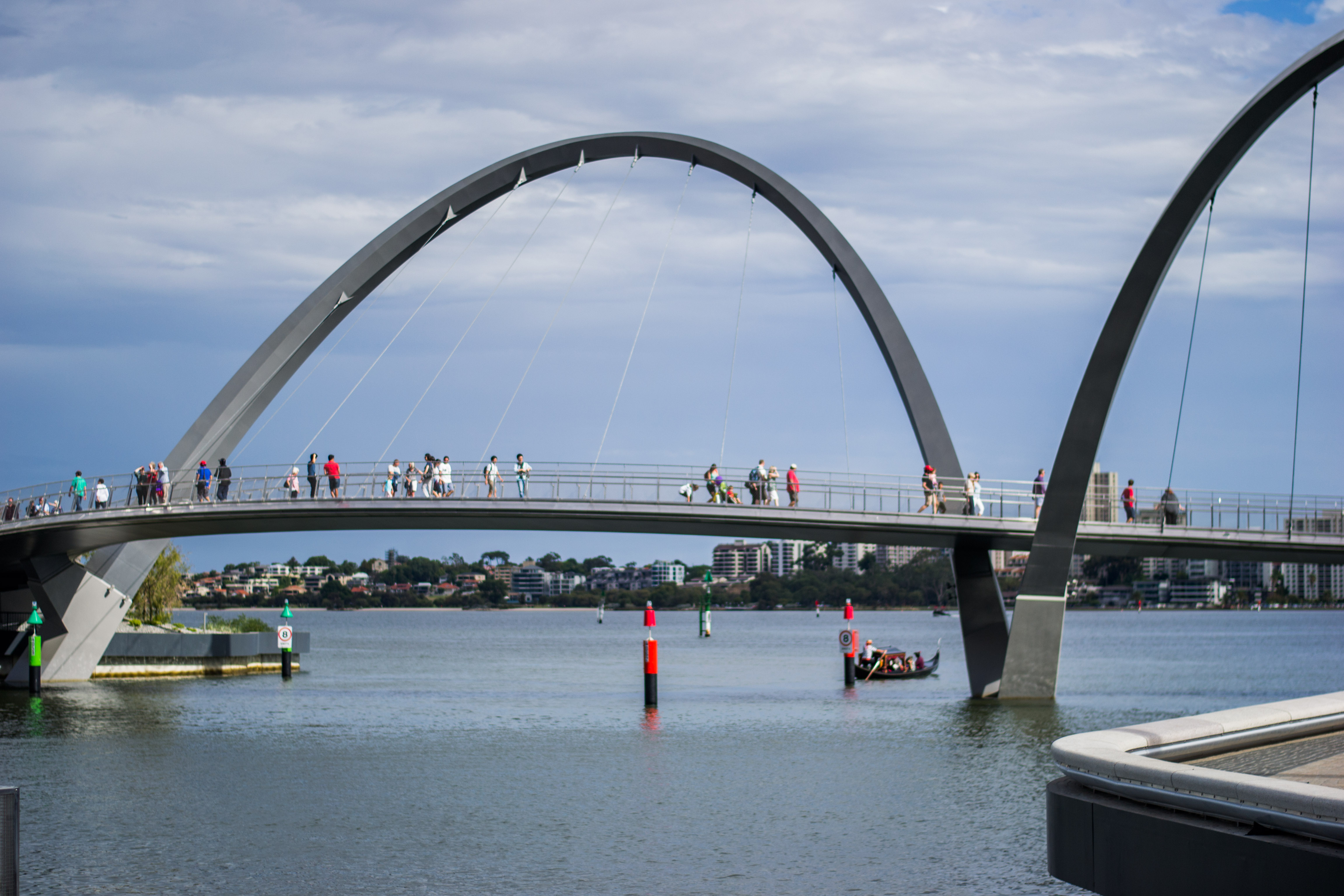
Curved bridge at Elizabeth Quay

Other modern buildings in the city include Council House, a restored high-modernist office building set in the Stirling Gardens, and the Perth Convention and Exhibition Centre, Western Australia's only purpose-built convention centre that can cater for functions of up to 5000 delegates.

Nearby, in the Elizabeth Quay precinct, are the Swan Bells: twelve historic bells from St Martin-in-the-Fields church in Trafalgar Square, London, which hang alongside six modern bells in an 82.5-metre-tall (271 ft) copper-and-glass campanile, commonly known as the Bell Tower and the Swan Bell Tower.

Yagan Square connects Northbridge and the Perth Central business district (CBD), with a 45-metre-high (148 ft) digital tower and the 9-metre-tall (30 ft) statue Wirin designed by the Noongar artist Tjyllyungoo.

The Northbridge Piazza is an outdoor area at the corner of Lake Street and James Street in Northbridge. The Piazza features a stage, an outdoor LED screen operating 24 hours a day, and public artworks. It was designed for community use, including performances, exhibitions, festivals, sporting events and other cultural activities.

There are several historical sites in Perth dating back to the 19th century.

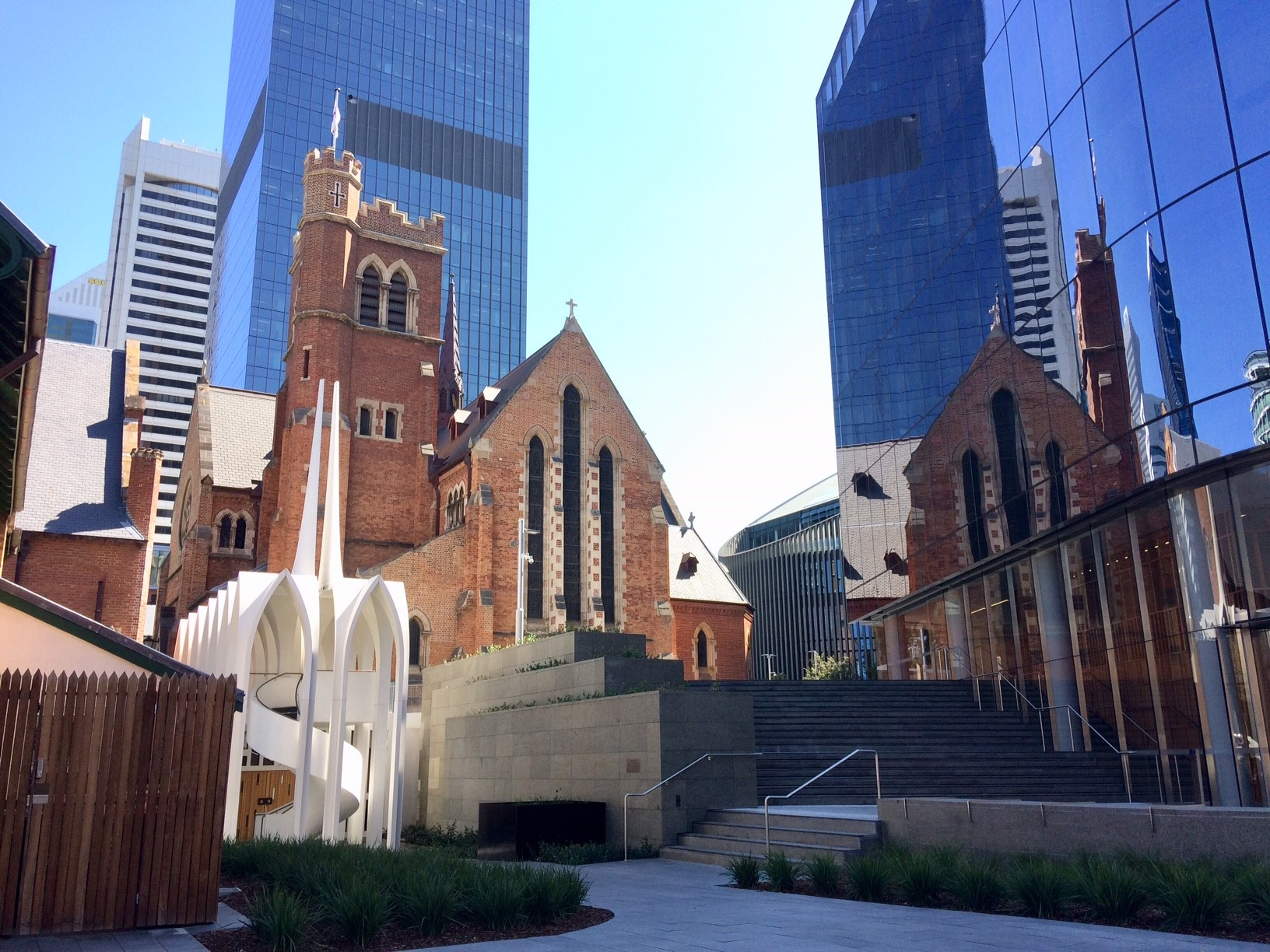
Cathedral Square

Barracks Arch is the last remaining of The Barracks, originally built in 1866 to house the Enrolled Pensioner Force. The military unit was formed from the guards who came on convict ships. The Barracks was demolished in the 1960s to allow for the construction of the Mitchell Freeway immediately west of the arch. The arch was retained after public outcry despite the original intention to remove it as an obstruction to the view of Parliament House.

The Perth Town Hall, situated on the corner of Hay and Barrack streets, is the only town hall in Australia to be built by convicts between 1868 and 1870. For many decades in the 20th century, shops were built into the sides of the ground floor, but the Town Hall was restored in the late 1990s, including repairs to the interior hall and the Gothic arches at its base.

The Cathedral Square precinct includes the eponymous St George's Cathedral, Cadogan Song School, The Deanery, Burt Memorial Hall, Church House (which houses the Anglican Diocese of Perth), City of Perth Library, the State Administrative Tribunal, and the Public Trustee Building.

The Perth Mint is Australia's oldest operating mint, established in 1899 to mint gold sovereigns for the British Empire. The Mint remained under the jurisdiction of Britain until 1 July 1970, when it became a statutory authority of the Government of Western Australia. It continues to serve the gold industry and manufactures most of Australia's legal-tender precious-metal coins, as well as many coin-related numismatic items for investors and coin collectors.

=== Fremantle ===
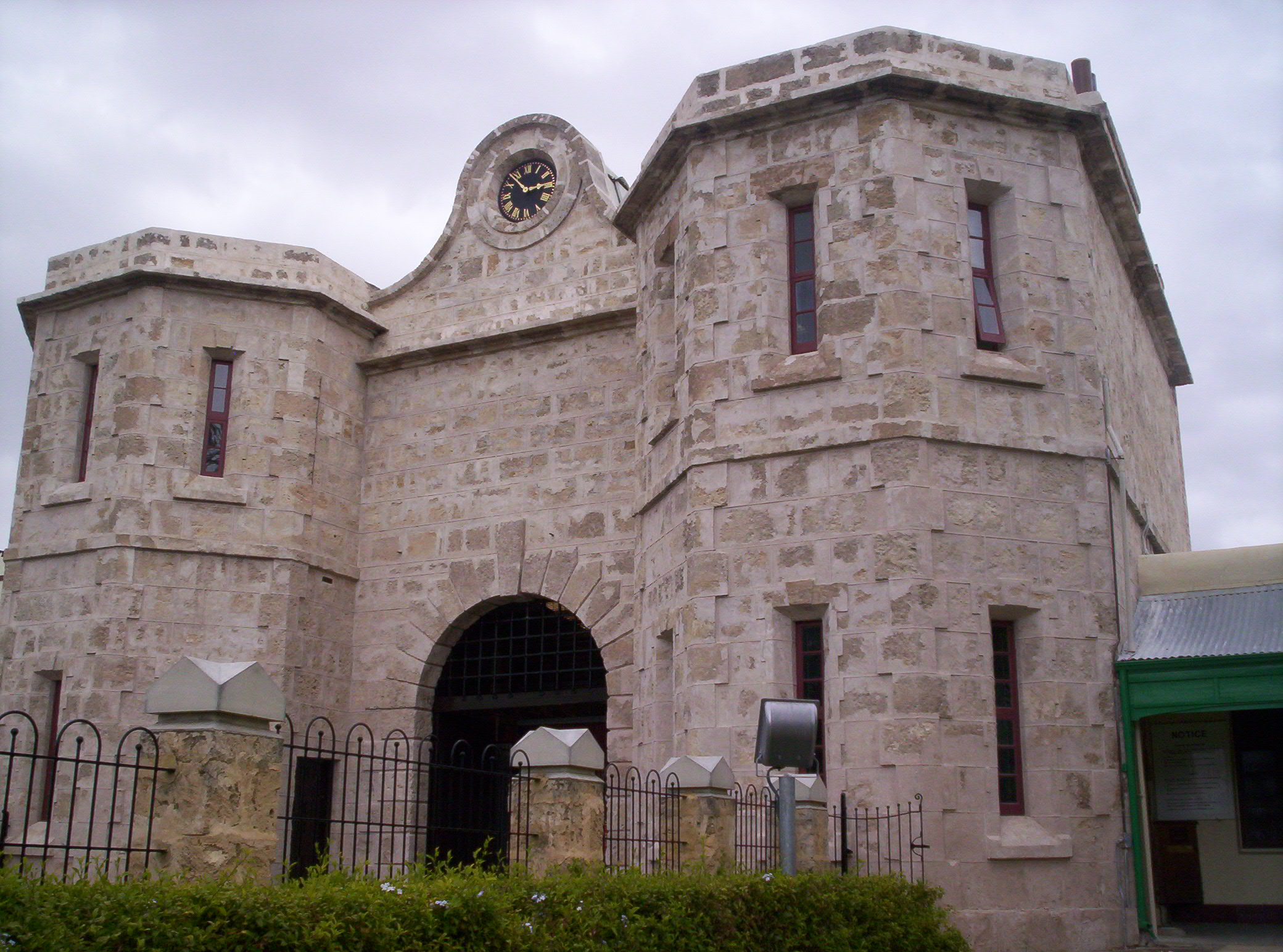
The gatehouse at Fremantle Prison

The Round House, located at Arthur Head, Fremantle, is the oldest building still standing in Western Australia. It was built in 1830 and used as a prison for Colonial and Indigenous prisoners until 1886.

Fremantle Prison is a former Australian prison located in The Terrace, Fremantle. The prison was built by convict labour in the 1850s and transferred to the colonial government in 1886 for use as a gaol for locally sentenced prisoners. It remained in operation as a prison until 1991. The historic site was preserved and is now a public museum, offering daytime and nighttime tours, as well as tours of the flooded tunnels and aqueducts beneath the prison.

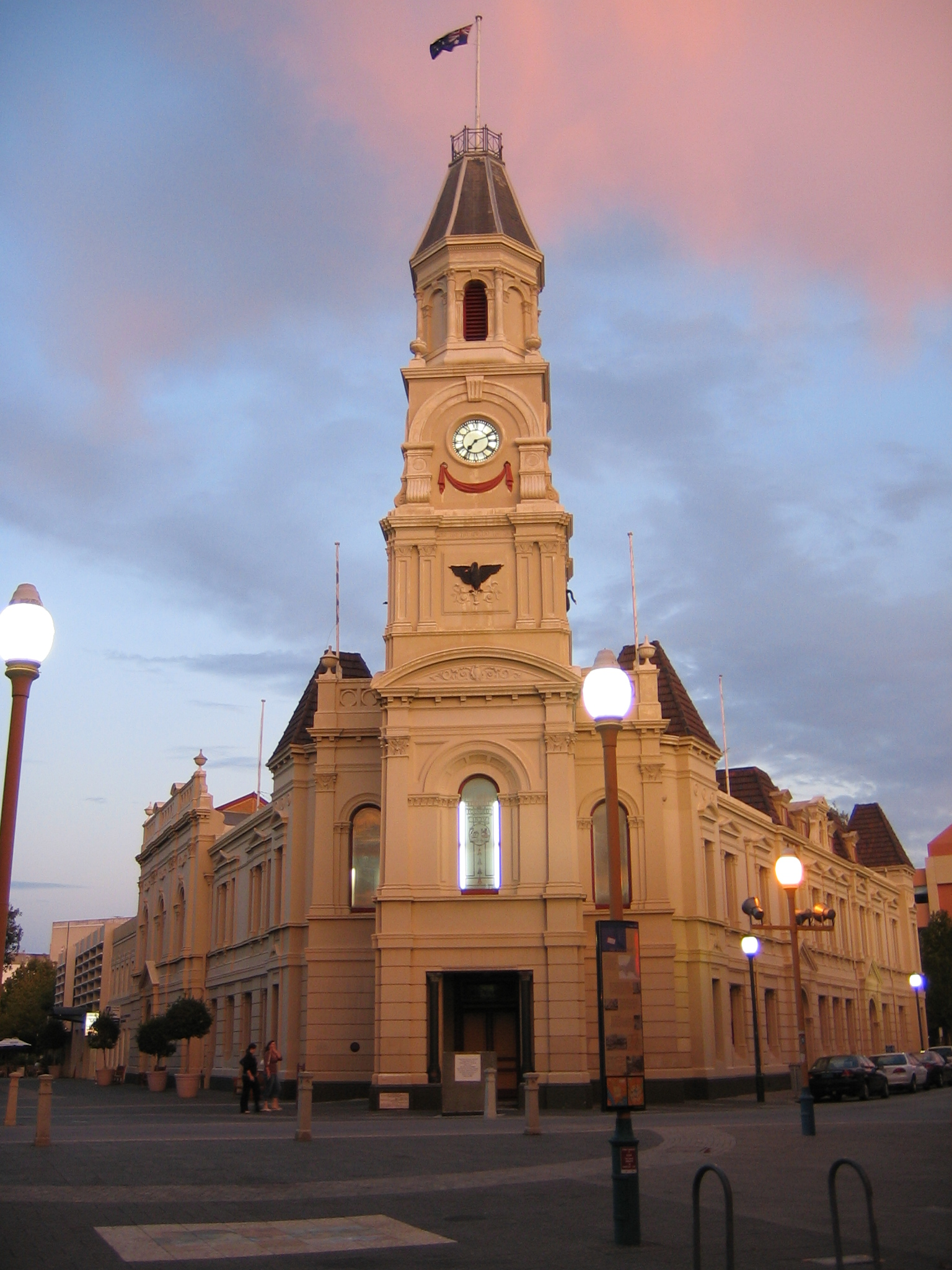
Fremantle Town Hall

Fremantle Town Hall is situated on the corner of High, William, and Adelaide Streets in Fremantle. It opened on 22 June 1887, coinciding with the celebration of Queen Victoria's Golden Jubilee.

The original Fremantle railway station, constructed in 1881 next to Cliff Street, Fremantle, was an important hub for gold miners arriving in Western Australia. In 1907, the station was moved to its present location on Elder Place to better serve the newly constructed Fremantle Port. It was built in the Federation Free Classical style, featuring a rare large train hall roof.

Fremantle Fishing Boat Harbour is a commercial marina that was constructed in 1919. It is the centre of a well-established tourism precinct, including many restaurants, some of Australia's largest fish-and-chip shops, and a brewery immediately adjacent.

The Fremantle War Memorial is located on Monument Hill in Fremantle and was established by the Fremantle Town Council in 1928 to commemorate the losses of the First World War. Further memorials have subsequently been added for those killed in other conflicts, and commemorative services are held yearly on Anzac Day (25 April) and Remembrance Day (11 November).

=== Metropolitan Perth ===
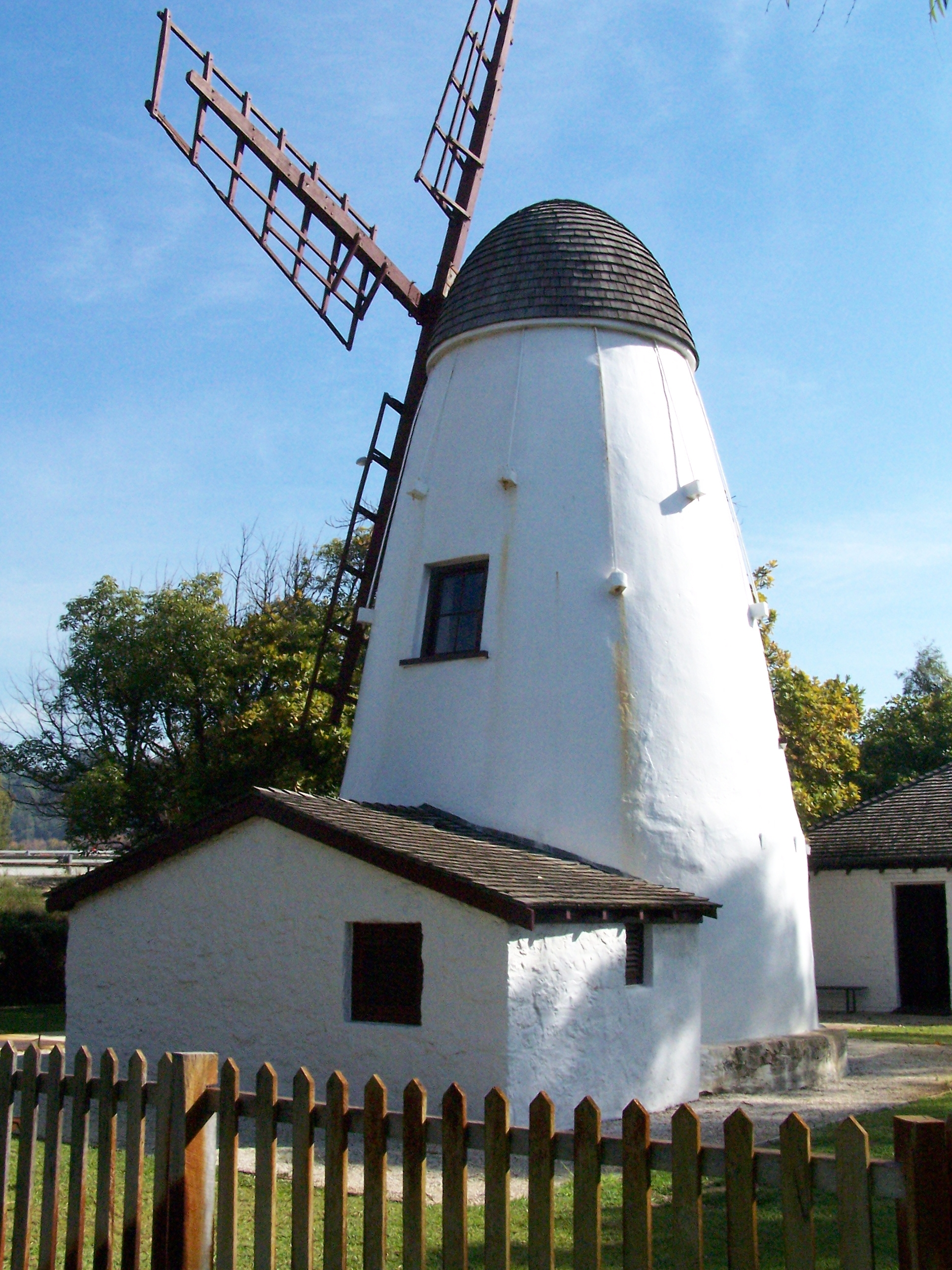
The Old Mill, South Perth

The Old Mill, also known as Shenton's Mill, is a restored tower mill located on Mill Point in South Perth. It has been restored to its original 1830s condition to serve as a historical attraction.

Lincoln Street Ventilation Stack in Highgate, Western Australia, is a 38-metre-tall (125 ft) former sewer vent, the second tallest in Australia. It was sealed in 1941 and secretly used as a radio antenna during World War II.

Crown Perth is located on the Swan River south-east of Perth. The complex includes a casino, several restaurants and bars, a nightclub, two hotels, a convention centre, a theatre and the Burswood Dome. The nearby Burswood railway station provides a public transport link to the Perth CBD.

Adventure World is a theme park located in Bibra Lake, 20 kilometres (12 mi) from the Perth CBD. The theme park contains many rides and attractions, including several water-based features, as well as a variety of food outlets.

Mundaring Weir is the name of a dam (and historically the adjoining locality) which is located 39 kilometres (24 mi) from Perth in the Darling Scarp. It is situated in the Mundaring locality. The dam crosses the Helena River. The town of Mundaring was gazetted in 1898, the same year the construction of the dam commenced. There are many tourist facilities in the area, including Mundaring Weir Hotel and the C Y O'Connor Museum, as well as an outdoor cinema, a youth hostel, an art gallery, and many picnicking spots.

== Nature and wildlife ==
=== Kings Park ===
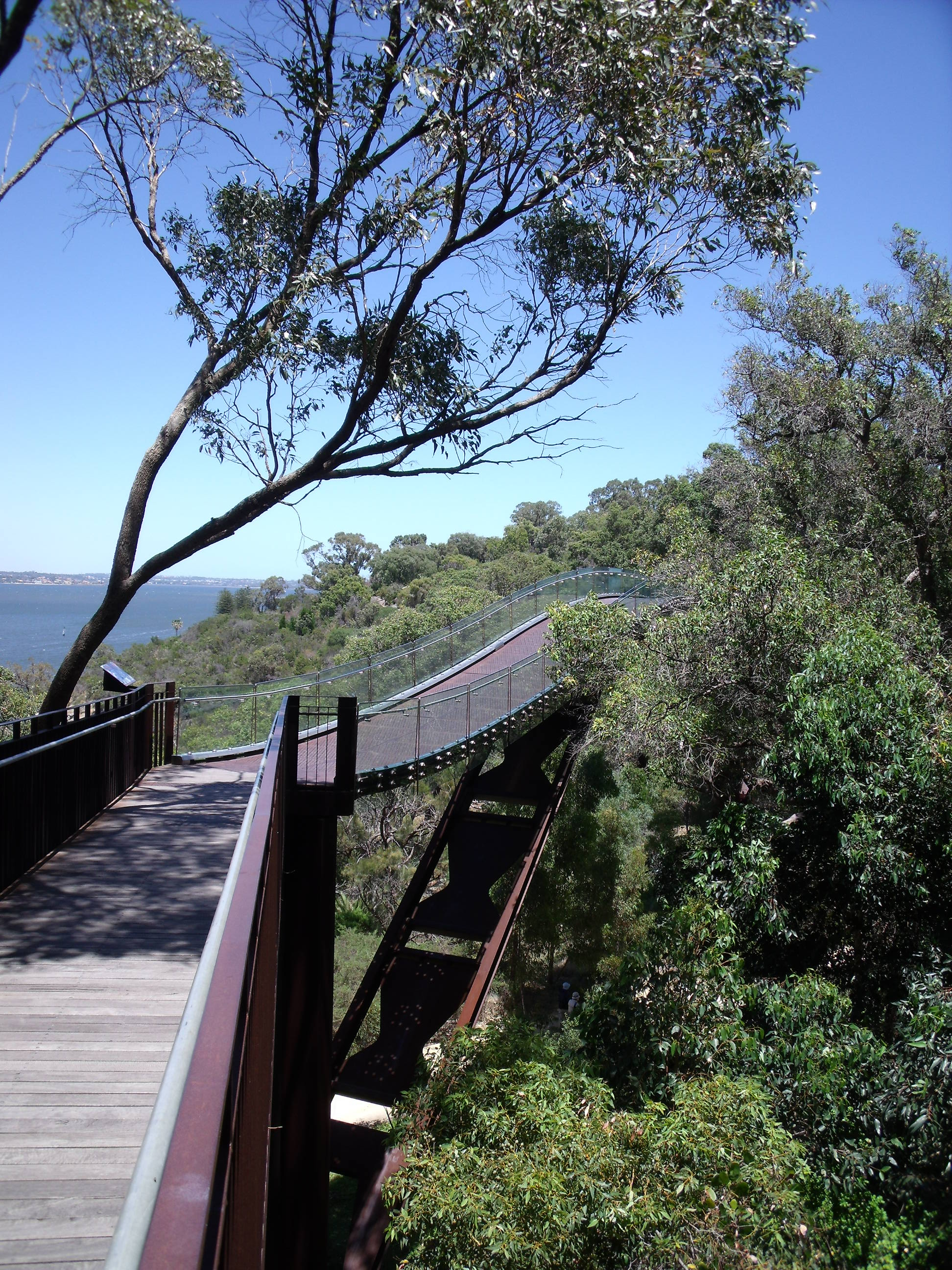
Tree top walk through Kings Park

Kings Park is a 4.06-square-kilometre (1,003-acre) park located on the western edge of the central business district in Perth. The park is a mixture of grassed parkland, botanical gardens and natural bushland on Mount Eliza, with two-thirds of the grounds conserved as native bushland. With panoramic views of the Swan River and Darling Range, it is home to over 300 native plant varieties and 80 bird species. It overlooks the city as well as Perth Water and Melville Water on the Swan River. There are many landmarks and attractions within Kings Park.

==== State War Memorial Precinct ====
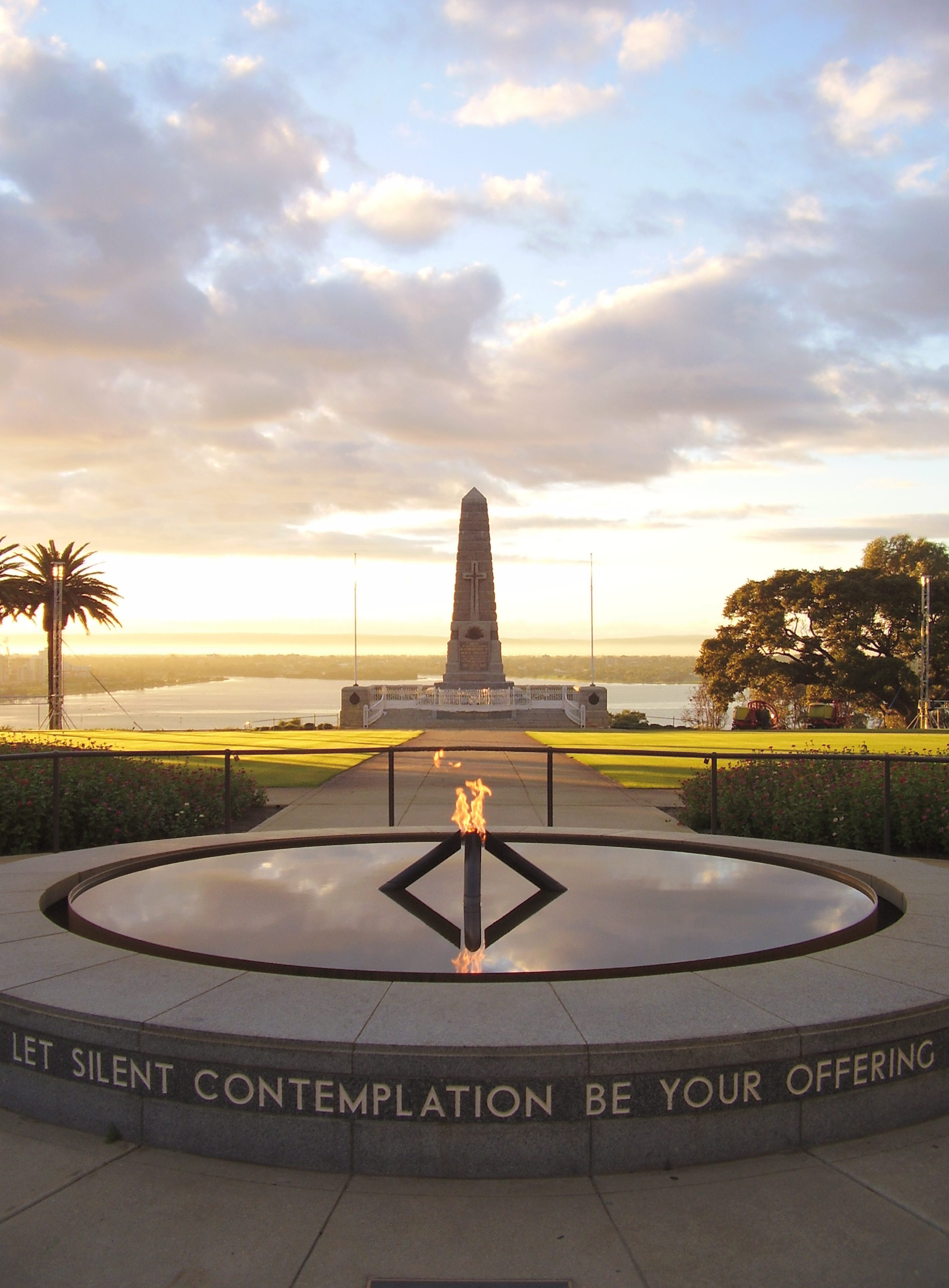
Kings Park War Memorial

The State War Memorial Precinct is located on Mount Eliza overlooking Perth Water, and comprises the Cenotaph, Court of Contemplation, Flame of Remembrance and Pool of Reflection. It is visited by more than 40,000 people every Anzac Day, with a dawn service being held there each year. Distributed throughout the park are more specific memorials.

==== Western Australian Botanic Garden ====
The Botanic Garden is an 18-hectare (44-acre) site within the park, with a collection of 2000 species of Western Australian flora on display. The Botanic Garden is part of the worldwide network of botanic gardens committed to plant conservation. Also located within the botanic garden are the Conservation Garden, Gija Jumulu boab tree, Pioneer Women's Memorial fountain and water garden, and the Lotterywest Federation Walkway.

==== DNA Tower ====
Built on the highest point of the park in 1966, the DNA Tower is a white, 15-metre-high (49 ft) double-helix staircase that resembles the deoxyribonucleic acid (DNA) molecule.

==== Children's areas ====
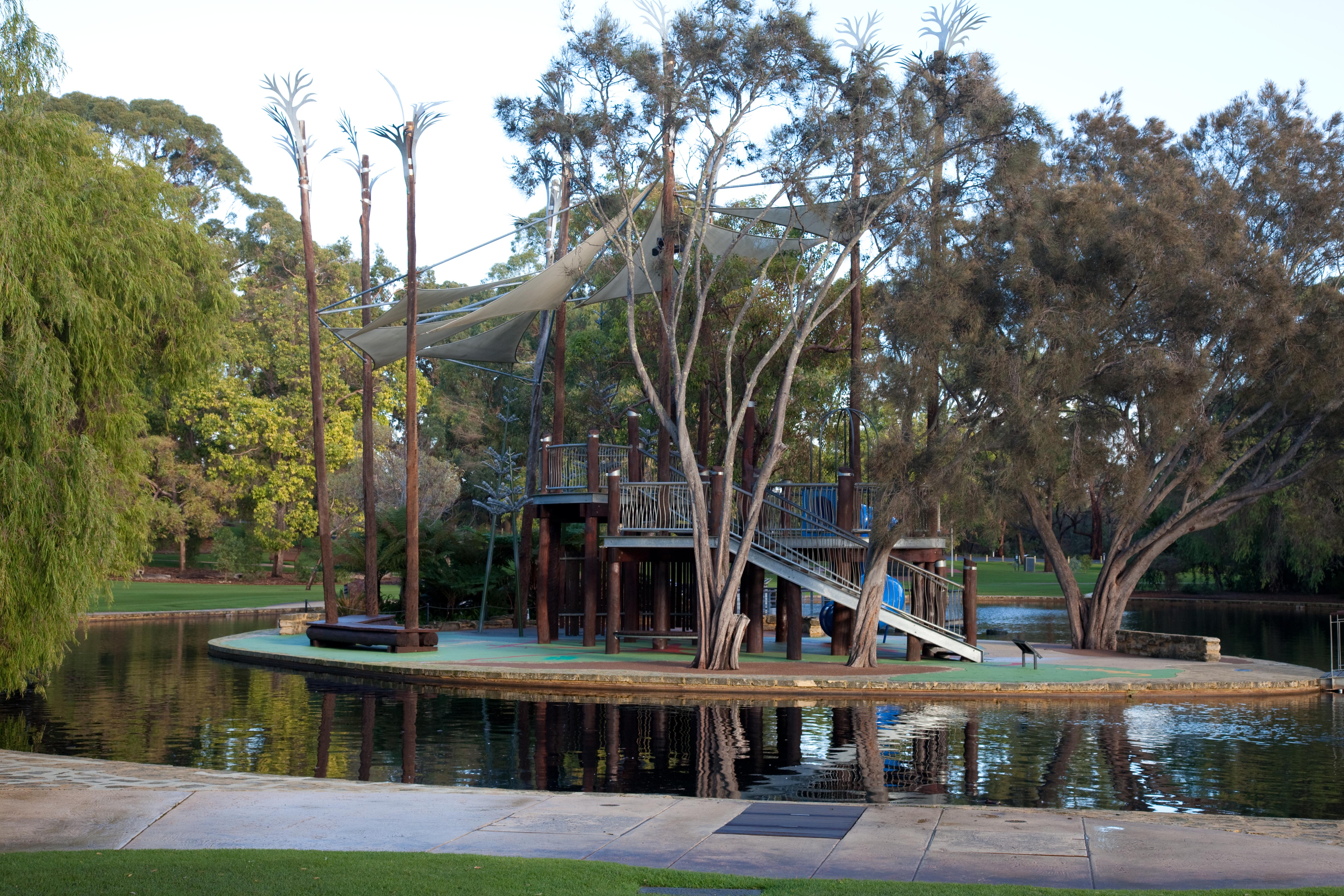
May Drive Parkland

The May Drive Parkland is one of two children's playgrounds in Kings Park, the other being the Ivey Watson Playground. It includes a lake and an island, play and climbing equipment for children, and life-sized dinosaur models. The Vietnam War Memorial and a coffee shop and cafe are located in the May Drive Parkland. Lotterywest Family Area is popular with young families and is specifically targeted for children under five. It was extensively refurbished in 2006 with funding from Lotterywest.

==== Jacob's Ladder ====
Jacob's Ladder is a set of stairs located at the end of Cliff Street that marks the boundary of Kings Park. It has 242 steps and leads down to Mounts Bay Road, and is a popular place to exercise.

=== Perth Zoo ===
The Perth Zoo is a 17-hectare (41-acre) zoo that opened in 1898 in South Perth. As of January 2011, it is home to 1258 animals of 164 species and includes an extensive botanical collection. The zoo has three main zones – Australian Walkabout, Asian Rainforest and African Savannah – as well as smaller exhibit areas.

=== Whiteman Park ===
Whiteman Park is a 4,000-hectare (9,900-acre) bushland area located 22 kilometres (14 mi) north of the Perth CBD. Located within Whiteman Park are bushwalking trails, bike paths, sports facilities, playgrounds, a tram on a 4-kilometre (2.5 mi) circular track, motor and tractor museums, and Caversham Wildlife Park.

=== Galup (formerly Lake Monger) ===
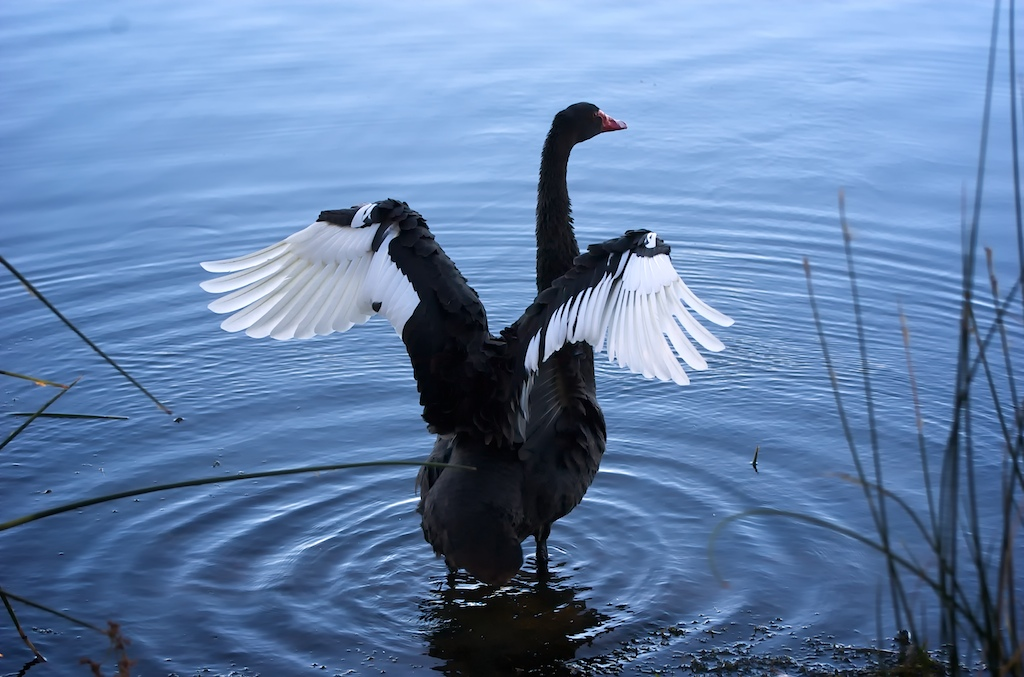
Black swan at Galup

Galup is a large urban wetland located between suburban development in Leederville, Wembley and Glendalough. It consists of 70 hectares (170 acres) of mainly open, shallow water, with a 1.3-hectare (3.2-acre) island in the south-west corner. The 110 hectares (270 acres) of lake and the surrounding parklands are known as Galup Reserve, and feature a 3.5-kilometre (2.2 mi) paved walking and cycling track that encircles the lake, playground equipment and barbecue facilities.

=== Langley Park ===
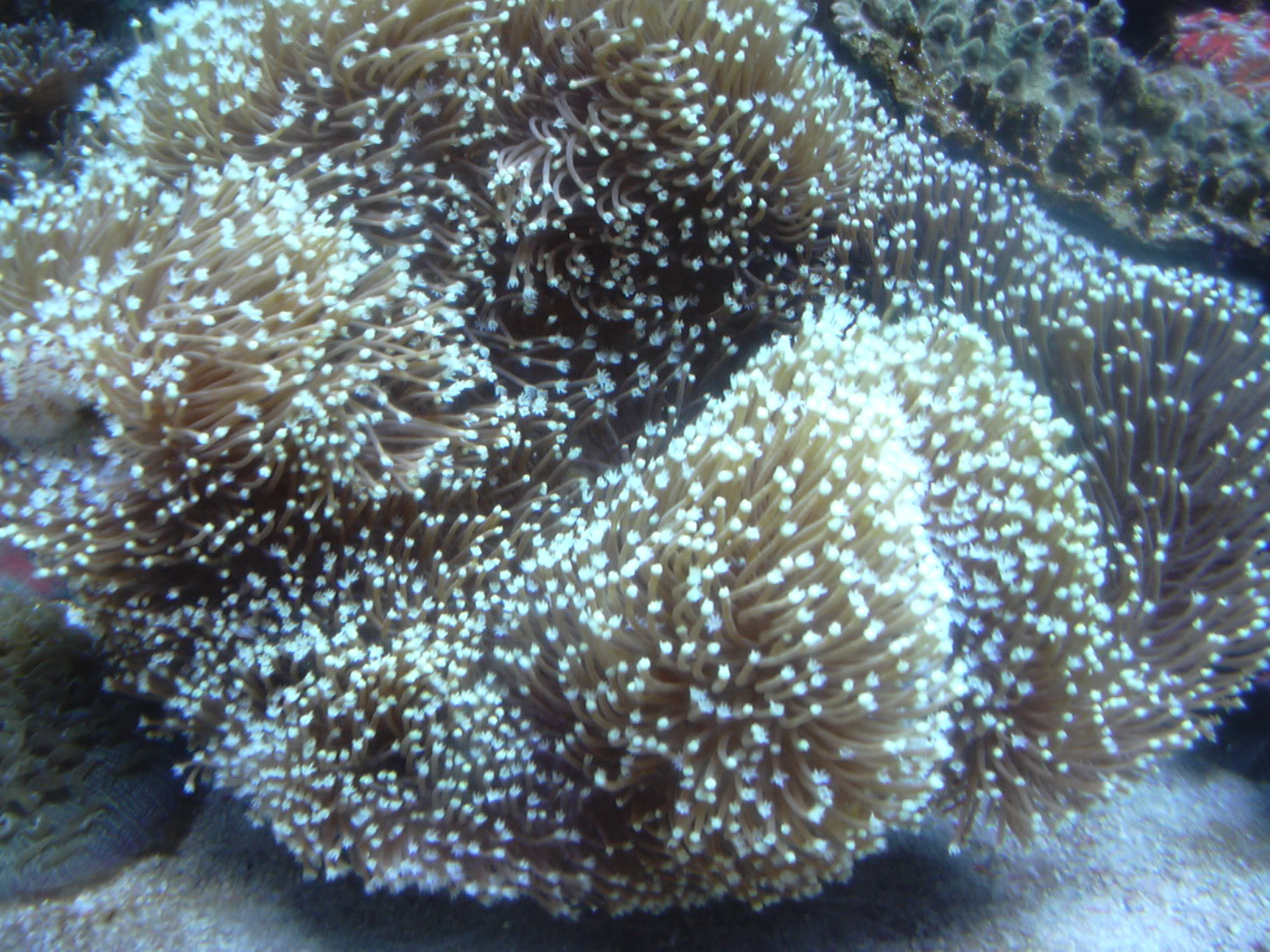
Sea anemones at AQWA

Langley Park is an open space in the Perth CBD. Running alongside Riverside Drive, it is grassed, rectangular, and measures 900 by 100 metres (2,950 ft × 330 ft). It was created by reclaiming land from the adjacent Swan River between 1921 and 1935.

=== AQWA ===
The Aquarium of Western Australia (AQWA) is a privately owned aquarium in Hillarys, Western Australia. AQWA is Australia's largest aquarium and the world's 10th-largest aquarium. The aquarium specialises in marine animals that inhabit the 12,000-kilometre (7,500 mi) western coast of Australia.

=== Rottnest Island ===
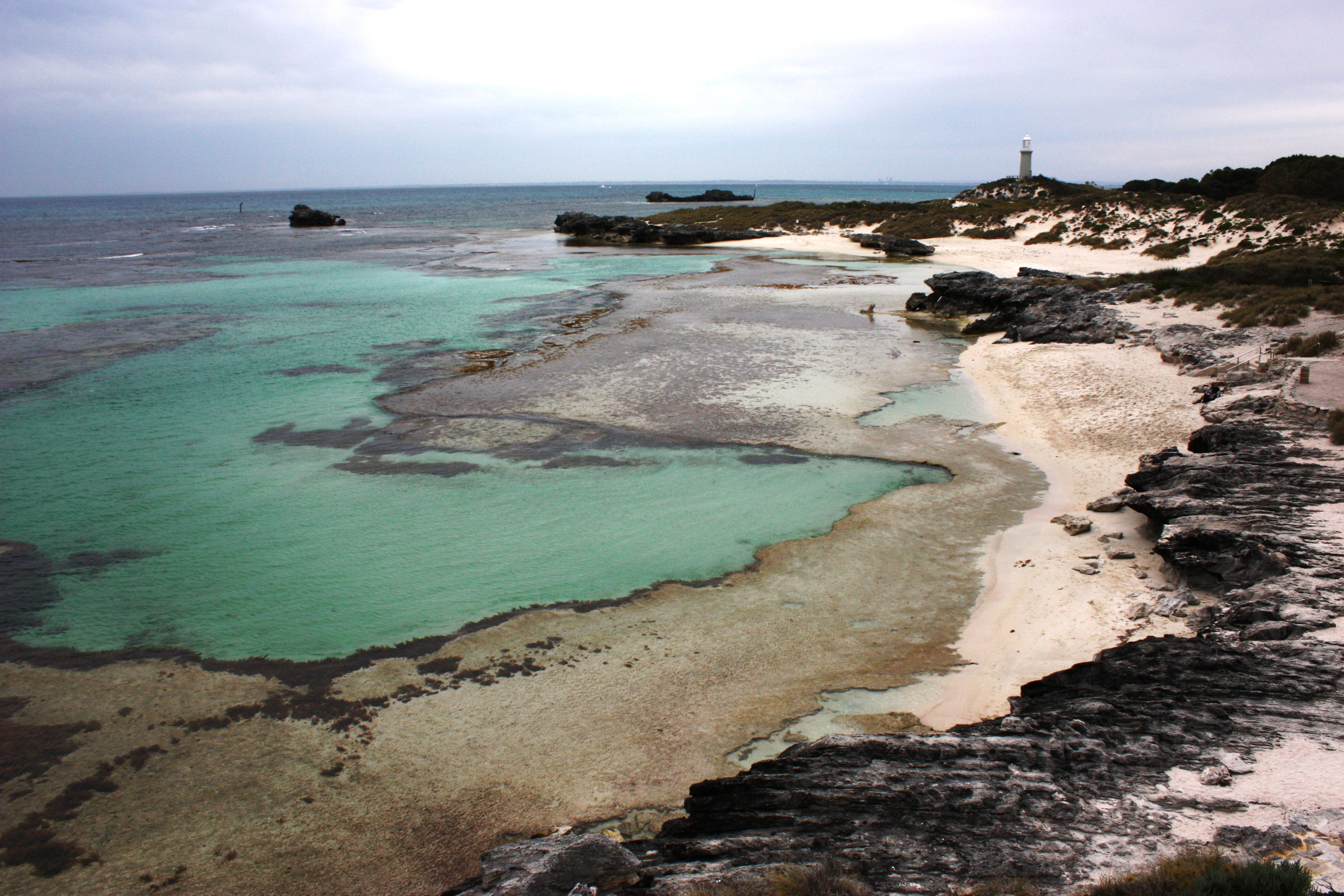
The Basin at Rottnest Island

Rottnest Island is an A-Class Reserve located 18 kilometres (11 mi) off the Western Australian coast, near Fremantle, that is currently devoted to recreational use. The island has many cycling tracks that connect to beaches and historical buildings.

=== Araluen Botanic Park ===
Araluen Botanical Park is located in a sheltered valley in the Darling Ranges, approximately 30 kilometres (19 mi) south of Perth, Western Australia, in the suburb of Roleystone. The Botanical Park covers about 59 hectares (150 acres) and features a mix of exotic plant varieties and remnants of native bush.

=== National parks ===
Avon Valley is a national park located 47 kilometres (29 mi) northeast of the Perth CBD. In the springtime, there is a diverse range of wildflowers. Toilets, water, shaded areas and wood barbecues are available for use; entry and camping fees apply.

John Forrest National Park is a national park in the Darling Scarp, 24 kilometres (15 mi) east of the Perth CBD. It was the first national park in Western Australia. There are several walking trails within the national park, including along the former route of the Eastern Railway.

Yanchep is a national park 42 kilometres (26 mi) north of the Perth CBD. The park is noted for its caves, native bush and koala colonies. It also offers cultural educational programmes offered in partnership with the local Noongar Aboriginal people.

=== Sunset Coast ===
Sunset Coast refers to the coastal section of metropolitan Perth, north of the Swan River. This includes Marmion Marine Park, a protected area inhabited by tropical fish, Australian sea lions, and bottlenose dolphins, and traversed by humpback whales. North of Marmion is Hillarys Boat Harbour, which includes Sorrento Quay and AQWA (the Aquarium of Western Australia). Cottesloe Beach hosts Sculpture by the Sea, an annual public exhibition of sculptures. Tourist Drive 204, also known as the Sunset Coast Tourist Drive, is a designated route from North Fremantle to Iluka that follows existing coastal roads.

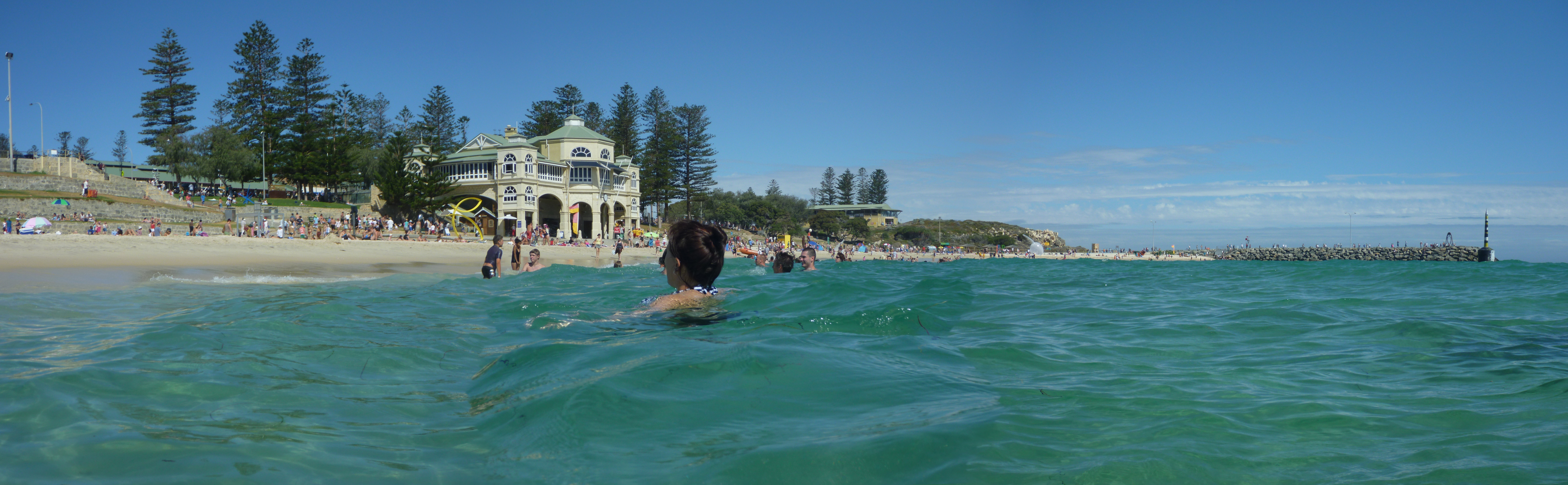
Swimming at Cottesloe Beach

=== Heirisson Island ===
Heirisson Island is located in the Swan River, between East Perth and Victoria Park suburbs, under the Causeway elevated street. It has a protected area inhabited by kangaroos, ducks and other birds. It is open for people to walk or ride their bicycles into the area. In 2017, there were at least five western grey kangaroos on the island. Outside the protected area, there are places for other amenities, such as picnics, fishing and barbecue. Dogs and pets are also allowed in this area. Walking all the way to the end of the Causeway in East Perth, you can find some restaurants facing the Swan River, bike and kayak rental services, Swan River boat tours and a children's park.

== Shopping ==
=== Shops in Perth CBD ===
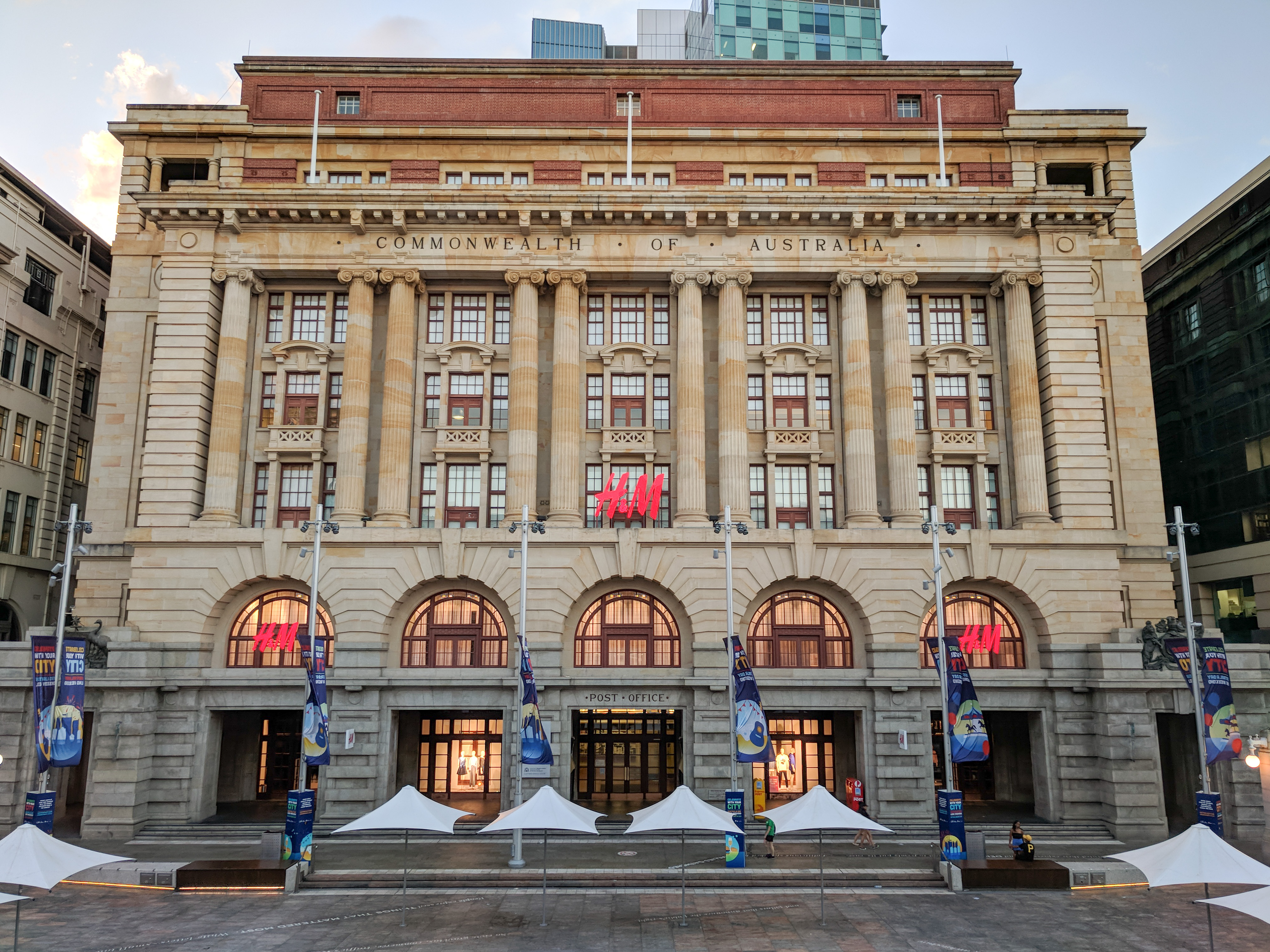
H&M, Forrest Place

Retail shopping in the Perth CBD is focused around Murray Street and Hay Street. Both of these streets are pedestrian malls between William Street and Barrack Street. Forrest Place is another pedestrian mall that connects the Murray Street Mall to Wellington Street and the Perth railway station. The Forrest Chase shopping centre, which features major retailer Myer, is located on the east side of Forrest Place, between the Murray Street mall and Wellington Street, and incorporates a pedestrian bridge over Wellington Street for direct access to Perth railway station. A number of arcades run between Hay Street and Murray Street, including the Piccadilly Arcade, which houses the Piccadilly Cinema that closed in 2013.

=== Watertown ===
Watertown Perth is located on Wellington Street in West Perth and features around 120 specialty stores, which are predominantly factory outlets for major brands.

=== Fremantle Markets ===
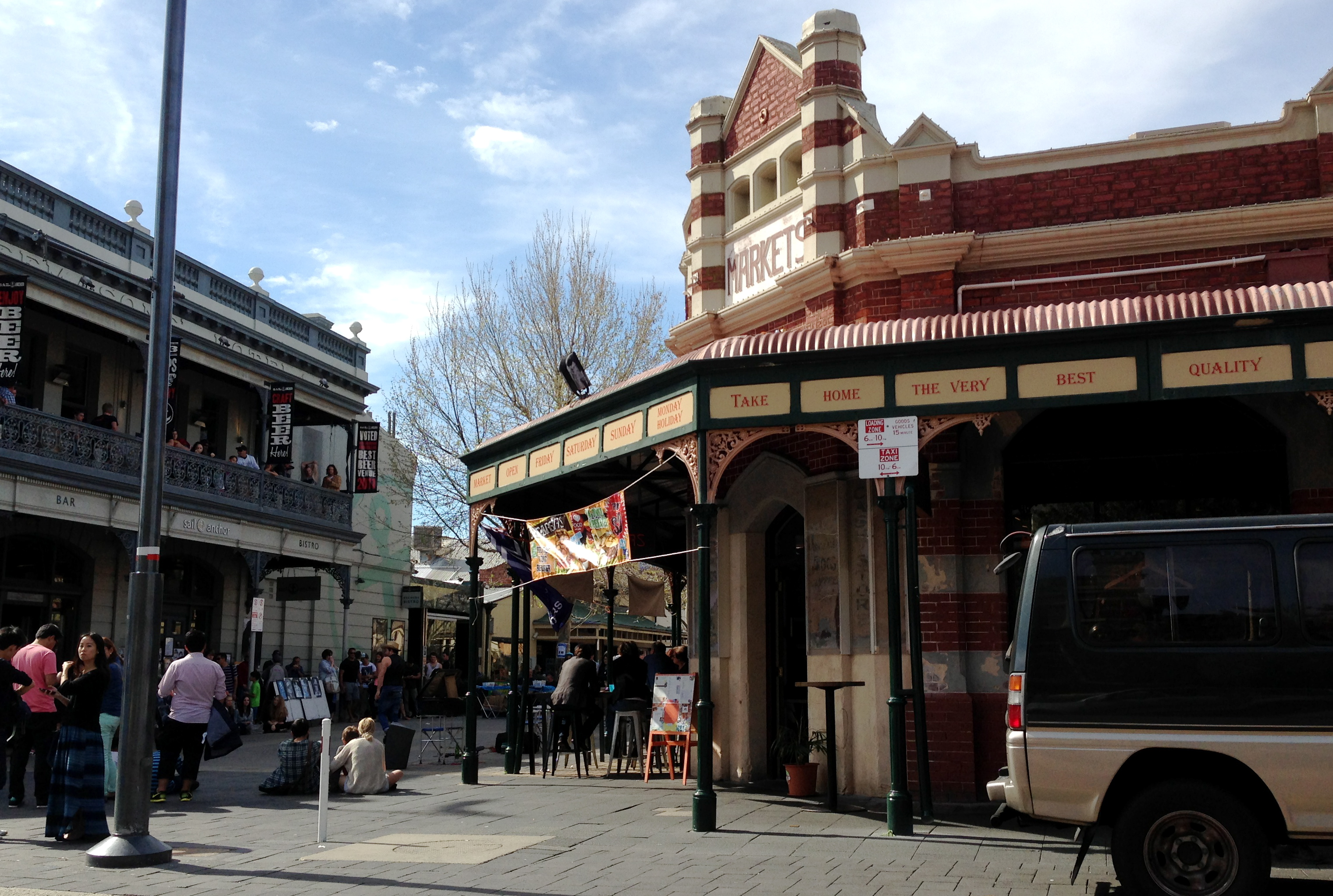
Fremantle Markets

The Fremantle Markets are a public market located at the corner of South Terrace and Henderson Street in Fremantle, Western Australia. Built in 1897, the market houses over 150 shops for craftspeople, fashion designers, merchants in the historic Hall, and fresh food producers, vegetable growers and food retailers in the Yard.

=== Joondalup ===
Joondalup's central business district, centred on Grand Boulevard, is largely a shopping and retail area lined with townhouses and apartments. Lakeside Joondalup is located adjacent to the Joondalup railway station and backs onto Grand Boulevard. The centre contains three supermarkets, three large discount variety stores, a cinema, and numerous smaller shops. Joondalup was granted the status of "tourism precinct" by the State Government in 2009, allowing for extended retail trading hours.

=== Midland ===
Midland's townsite is based around both the Great Eastern Highway, which carries eastbound traffic, and Victoria Street, which carries westbound traffic. Development was initially centred on the historic Town Hall and Post Office buildings, constructed in 1906 and 1913, respectively; however, the modern focus is centred on the Midland Gate shopping centre further east. The centre features two supermarkets, three large discount variety stores, a cinema, and numerous smaller shops.

== Food and wine ==
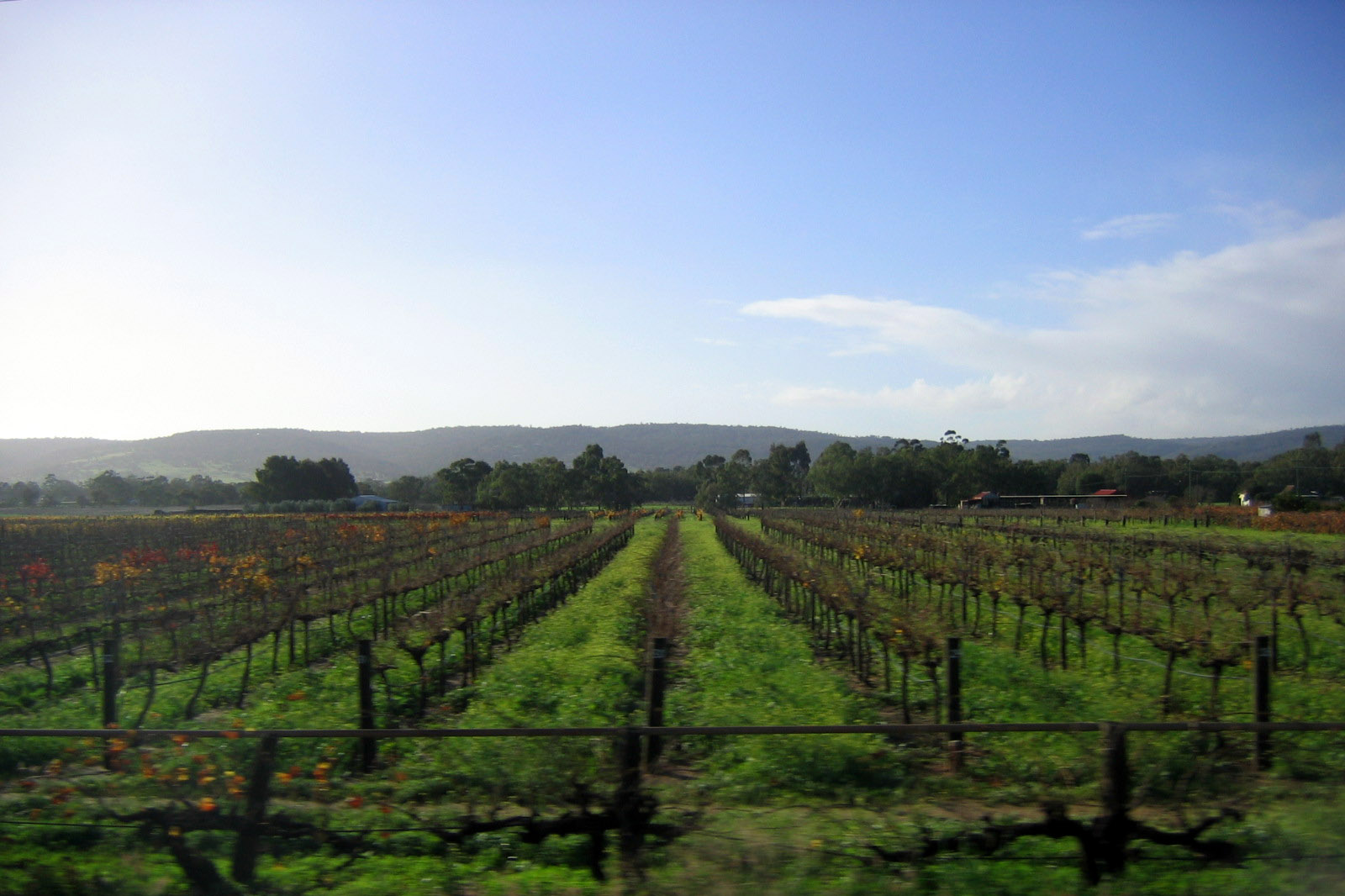
A vineyard in the Swan Valley

=== Swan Valley ===
The Swan Valley is noted for its fertile soil, uncommon in the Perth region, and features numerous wineries, such as the large complex at Houghton's, the state's biggest producer, Sandalford's, and many smaller operators, including microbreweries and rum distilleries. The Swan Valley also contains specialised food producers and many restaurants and cafes. Roadside stalls sell seasonal fruit year-round. Tourist Drive 203 is a circular route in the Swan Valley, passing many attractions along West Swan Road and the Great Northern Highway.

== See also ==
- Tourism in Australia
- Islands of Perth, Western Australia
