= Sarah Dunlop =

Neuroplasticity and neuroscience researcher

Sarah Dunlop is an Australian researcher working in neuroplasticity, neuroscience and community programs for people with spinal cord injury.

Dunlop is head of an integrated program of laboratory and clinical research at The University of Western Australia and Royal Perth Hospital promoting functional recovery after traumatic injury to the nervous system. Laboratory studies use rodent models and focus on preventing the spread of secondary degeneration to intact tissue.

She currently serves on the board of the Quadriplegic Centre and is a member of the editorial board of the journal Spinal Cord. She has contributed to the Australian Neuroscience Society, and was their president for a period of time.

Dunlop presented at the Australian National University on the clinical trials for spinal care in 2018. She described the launch of the Spinal Network, serving on the board and as chair of its Clinical Trials Committee.

== Career ==
Dunlop is the head of school, within the Faculty of Science, at the University of Western Australia.

Dunlop's qualifications include a BSc (hons, zoology), London and a PhD, London.

Clinical studies within Dunlop's team comprise three multi-centre randomized controlled trials “Spinal Cord Injury and Physical Activity (SCIPA)” involving all 8 spinal units in Australia and New Zealand and the purpose of these is to examine novel ways of exercising the paralysed limbs to promote neurological recovery and improve health. The trials span acute care to the community, reflecting the lifetime need of these patients. “ICED” (immediate cooling and early decompression) is another multi-centre clinical initiative focusing on acute spinal cord injury involving immediate hypothermia in the ambulance to buy time and limit secondary damage before emergency surgical decompression. Another more recent multi-centre initiative involves examining bladder care and urinary tract infections, a major secondary complication following spinal cord injury, with the goal of improving best practice for bladder health.

Dunlop leads a program of laboratory and clinical research promoting recovery after traumatic injury to the nervous system. Laboratory studies focus on understanding the spread of secondary degeneration using technologies such as red light, pulsed magnetic fields and nanotechnology to target drug delivery.

As at July 2019 her H index was 39, and number of citations was over 5300 (Scopus).

== Awards and recognition ==
Dunlop was awarded almost $5 million in funding for the SCIPA randomized control trials.

- 2016 – awarded the Research Award from the Spine Society of Australia, for 'the most outstanding contributions in the fields of basic science, biomechanics or clinical studies of the spine'.
- 2012 – one of three finalists of Western Australian of the year.
- 2011–2013 – principal research fellow of NH&MRC.
- 1998–2010 – senior research fellow, NH&MRC, Animal Biology, UWA.
