= Western Australian Academy of Performing Arts =

Performing arts school of Edith Cowan University

- Established: 1980; 46 years ago
- Parent institution: Edith Cowan University
- Affiliations: CILECT
- Director: David Shirley
- Students: 1,287
- Location: 500 Wellington Street, Perth, Western Australia, Australia
- Campus: Urban
- Colours: Dark purple
- Website: Official website

The Western Australian Academy of Performing Arts (WAAPA) at Edith Cowan University (ECU) is a performing arts school located in Perth, Western Australia. Established in 1980, it is notable for being the most comprehensive performing arts school in Australia by disciplines of study and has produced some of Australia's most prominent graduates in the field.

WAAPA was based at ECU's Mount Lawley campus until late 2025. In early 2026, WAAPA completed its move to the ECU City campus. Designed by architectural firm Lyons, the "vertical campus" is situated at the Perth City Link adjacent to Yagan Square. The precinct features the Minderoo Centre for Performance Excellence, which houses six world-class performance venues and hosts over 300 public performances annually. The campus is a centerpiece of the Perth City Deal, positioned directly above the underground Perth Busport and adjacent to the Perth railway station to maximise public accessibility.

As of 2019, the executive dean of the school is David Shirley. Prior to being assigned, he was the director of the Manchester School of Theatre and chair of the Federation of Drama Schools in the United Kingdom.

== Courses ==
It offers study and research programs in acting, screen performance, arts and cultural management, dance (classical ballet and contemporary dance), music (in various fields of instrumental and voice performance, composition and school teacher education), theatre (including directing and musical theatre), production (including production design, costume design, lighting, props and scenery, sound and stage management) and other fields of performing arts.

It also offers a vocational program in Aboriginal performance and a Doctor of Philosophy (PhD) research program with an integrated "performance, exhibition, event or an embodiment of some form". Broadcasting is now taught in the School of Communications and Arts of ECU. Originally an initiative of the state government, the academy receives funding from both the State and Commonwealth governments.

== Public performances ==
WAAPA presents an extensive annual public performance program featuring over 300 shows across all disciplines. Until 2025, these events were mostly held at WAAPA's own theatres and facilities in Mount Lawley. Since 2026, these productions have been primarily centred at the academy's new home within the Minderoo Centre for Performance Excellence at the ECU City campus.

In addition to the ECU City venues, the academy maintains strong partnerships with external performance spaces. Productions and events continue to be staged at various venues across Western Australia, including the Regal Theatre, Ellington Jazz Club, Luna Leederville, Government House Ballroom, The Blue Room Theatre, and the Albany Entertainment Centre.

== Venues and facilities ==
=== ECU City campus ===
In February 2026, WAAPA relocated to the ECU City campus, a $853 million vertical university campus located at the Perth City Link in the central business district. The 65,000 m^{2} (700,000 sq ft) campus features a highly advanced acoustic environment, utilizing "box-in-box" engineering to isolate its primary performance venues.

Prior to the move, the WAAPA buildings and facilities formed part of the Edith Cowan University campus in Mount Lawley.

The academy features six flagship public performance spaces designed for professional-grade training and public engagement:

- Playhouse Theatre: A 238-seat venue featuring a traditional proscenium arch, serving as the main home for drama, musical theatre, and opera.
- Recital Hall: A 368-seat premier acoustic space tailored for orchestral, chamber, and choral music.
- Flex Theatre: A 152-seat "black box" space with a retractable seating system for experimental and immersive performance.
- Jazz and Contemporary Music Studio: A 200-seat, club-style venue designed for jazz, soul, and contemporary music.
- Dance Theatre: A 143-seat specialized venue with a high-clearance ceiling and sprung flooring for classical ballet and contemporary dance.
- Aboriginal Performance Theatre: An 80-seat dedicated space for the teaching and public performance of First Nations song and dance.

Beyond the main stages, the campus houses over 300 performance-capable spaces, including 18 world-class rehearsal studios, specialized production workshops for costume and set design, and advanced sound recording suites. The facility also integrates the WA Screen Academy, providing digital media and broadcasting students with professional-grade television and radio studios that interface directly with the academy's live performance data networks.

=== Former Mount Lawley campus ===
Prior to its closure, the WAAPA facilities at the ECU Mount Lawley campus featured multiple buildings and workshops, including eight public performance spaces. These included the 297-seat Geoff Gibbs Theatre proscenium, the 200-seat Richard Gill Auditorium, the 194-seat court style Roundhouse Theatre, an outdoor amphitheater, Enright Studio, dance studios and a jazz studio. Four more purpose built dance/rehearsal studio spaces were also created. A recording studio, electronics studio, and four production workshops for design and costume making were also added to the existing workshops and behind the scenes production facilities. Other facilities included twelve large rehearsal and dance studios, music and ensemble studios, a specialised visual and performing arts library collection, multiple exhibition spaces, and fully equipped broadcasting facilities with studios for television and radio. The addition of the broadcasting facilities allowed broadcasting students to gain first hand experience of working within a media environment.

== Academic appointments ==
Academic teaching appointments are made on the basis of qualifications, recent professional experience, industry profile, and reputation. WAAPA invites international professionals to Perth as artists in residence to work with students on productions and performances and to provide performance and professional advice through workshops.

Notable past teaching appointments include the Australian conductor Richard Gill who founded the Classical Music course at WAAPA and became dean of WAAPA from 1985 to 1990. Nick Enright was adjunct professor at the School of Drama from 1998 to 2000, Cat Hope was head of composition and music technology from 2004 to 2011, Geoffrey Lancaster teaches historical keyboards performance.

== Notable alumni ==
- Hollie Andrew
- Luke Arnold
- Viva Bianca
- Andrew Bibby
- Amanda Bishop
- Shalom Brune-Franklin
- Jeremy Callaghan
- Fiona Campbell
- Jarrod Carland
- Vivien Carter
- Karina Carvalho
- Bryn Chapman Parish
- Dustin Clare
- Imelda Corcoran
- Sam Corlett
- Jai Courtney
- Martin Crewes
- Cassie Davis
- Charmaine Dragun
- Stella Donnelly
- Lucy Durack
- Georgie Gardner
- Mark Gasser
- Marcus Graham
- Kerrie Anne Greenland
- Haruhisa Handa
- Georgina Haig
- Geraldine Hakewill
- Karla Hart
- Hugh Jackman
- Jim Jefferies
- Kate Jenkinson
- Hélène Joy
- Alasdair Kent
- Kučka
- Gerald Lepkowski
- Ewen Leslie
- Ben Lewis
- Meg Mac
- Tammy MacIntosh
- Suzie Mathers
- Tim McGarry
- Ainsley Melham
- Jonathan Messer
- William McInnes
- Lisa McCune
- Tim Minchin
- Seann Miley Moore
- Dacre Montgomery
- Frances O'Connor
- Ben O'Toole
- Linda May Han Oh
- Taryn Onofaro
- Paul Paddick
- Karin Page
- Nicholas Papademetriou
- Kevin Penkin
- Eddie Perfect
- Chris Piechocki
- Gemma Pranita
- Aiv Puglielli
- Dominic Purcell
- Daina Reid
- Matthew Lee Robinson
- Gretel Scarlett
- Kris Stewart
- Roza Terenzi
- Pria Viswalingam
- Erica Wardle
- Nic Westaway
