= Milica Davies =

- Born: Milica Ilić; 1981 (age 44–45); Bosnia and Herzegovina
- Origin: Perth, Western Australia
- Genre: classical
- Occupations: Musician, teacher
- Instrument: guitar
- Years active: 1998–present
- Labels: Move, Twilight Classics, P3 Music
- Website: guitargrades.co.uk

Milica Davies (née Ilić, born 1981) is an Australian classical guitarist. She has released three albums, Rouge Guitar (2005), Stir the Sky (2007) and Evie's Song (2012). In 2002, she toured Australia and Asia backing José Carreras. As from 2004, Davies is based in London where she also teaches guitar.

== Biography ==
Born in Bosnia and Herzegovina, Milica Ilić took up classical guitar at seven years old and was 11 when the family relocated to Perth, Western Australia. She has toured in Australia, Asia and Europe, performing as a soloist, with orchestra and as an accompanist. She holds a First Class Honours degree in performance, from the University of Western Australia, Perth, where she studied with guitar teacher, John Casey. In 2002, she toured Australia and Asia backing José Carreras. In 2004 she was honoured with a Western Australian Citizen of the Year Award for her contribution to the state's Youth Arts. Her work – live and on record – has been played on the BBC, Classic FM (UK) and the Australian Broadcasting Corporation.

Ilić released her debut album, Rouge Guitar, which had been recorded in Perth in March, 2004 with Paul Wright on violin. From 2006 she has periodically performed and toured with guitar duo, Desert Child, which are Guy Ghouse and Damian Watkiss. For her second album, Stir the Sky (May 2007), she used Wright with Ghouse on guitar, Watkiss on acoustic guitar and Jessica Ipkendanz on violin. She co-produced the album with Lee Bundle and issued it on Twilight Classics.

In 2004 Ilić relocated to London where she performs and teaches guitar. During 2009 she toured Australia with Guitar Heaven Quartet, which comprise Ghouse, Watkiss and Simon Fox. Davies released her third album, Evie's Song in November 2012. Again, she worked with Ghouse, Ipkendanz, Watkiss and Wright. The album is dedicated to Davies' idol, Eva Cassidy. Her fourth album, Go South in the Winter, is due for release in 2016, in collaboration with the flamenco master Ramon Ruiz.

== Discography ==
=== Albums ===
- Rouge Guitar (Move Records, 15 April 2005)
- Stir the Sky (Twilight Classics, 5 May 2007)
- Evie's Song (P3 Music, November 2012)
- Go South in the Winter (Due for release 2016)

=== DVDs ===
- In Conversation and on Stage (2005)
