= Ericaamerica =

Clothing brands of Australia

Ericaamerica suit on display at the Western Australian Museum as part of the "ericaamerica: A Cave of Wonders" exhibition

ericaamerica is an Australian Menswear label started by Erica Wardle and Lucas Bowers in 2001. ericaamerica is known for its sharp technical cuts, historical references, and "unorthodox blend of sheer cheek and arch elegance" which has been referred to, by critics, as "uber masculine".

== Education and career ==
Designers Erica Wardle and Lucas Bowers were trained in costuming, bespoke millinery and fine arts respectively and bring to their clothing a background in theatrical costuming, dance costuming and a variety of other art practices. Erica Wardle studied costume and millinery at the Western Australian Academy of Performing Arts (WAPAA) and worked with performance groups Chrissie Parrot Dance Company and Skadada early in her career, opening her first store as a fashion designer at the age of 19. Lucas Bowers studied painting at the Curtin University School of Art and worked as a graphic designer before moving into fashion. The pair established ericaamerica in 2001, winning the nationwide Mercedes Benz Start Up Award and debuted at Australian Fashion Week in 2002. The label's reputation as an innovator was quickly established, with fashion magazine Australian Style noting "ericaamerica is re-inventing menswear with a focus on garment cut and construction"

The label presented the first all menswear individual collection show in the history of Mercedes Australian Fashion Week, and was the first Western Australian label to do runway at New York Fashion Week in September 2005.

In 2005 Lucas Bowers received the Western Australia Citizen of the Year award, in the category of Syd Donovan Youth Arts. The duo were also chosen for inclusion in the Who's Who of Western Australia publication, the state edition of the National Who's Who in Australia.

== Fashion Collections ==
The label has released nine commercially available collections, and is known for its commitment to releasing collections with a strong thematic focus.

The juxtaposition of historical garment reference with contemporary sub-cultural influences is a consistent element of an aesthetic described by Harper’s Bazaar as "Victorian dandies meet modern tailoring"

Ericaamerica's reputation for theatrical catwalk shows gained prominence with the presentation of their 2003 runway collection "Revival" which saw them "dubbed the fashion prodigies from the west" and according to critics, set a new tone for menswear presentations where the "models tread the black catwalk like evil dandies of a new fashion millennium" Slender suits were tailored with custom made textiles, a feature the label has come to be known for.

The 2004 "Victoriana" collection was the first ever all men's individual runway show in the history of Australian Fashion Week. The show exhibited the boldest work to date from the duo. In a 2010 interview with Oyster, Sydney’s Powerhouse Museum's Curator of Fashion, Glynis Jones listed ericaamerica's Victoriana parade as one of her ten favourite Australian Fashion Week shows of the last 15 years. Later that year the label created another Australian Fashion Week first when they released their "Viva Le Incroyables" collection, not on the runway, but in the form of a short film screened at the cinema of The Australian Centre for the Moving Image. The movie was also distributed as a limited edition DVD. This began a growing practice by ericaamerica to explore new ways to present fashion based work.

In 2005, after debuting it at the Spring/Summer Australian Fashion Week shows ericaamerica took their "Wanted" collection to New York Fashion Week for their inaugural showing in the United States. In the same year the label launched its first range of clothing for women: "Dressage by ericaamerica". An instant hit both in Australia and overseas the line was a featured show on the UK Vogue website and is now stocked in stores around the world.

Since 2006, when the label last showed at the L'Oreal Melbourne Fashion Festival, the pair have focused almost entirely on alternative methods of presentation, for their collections. "We decided we wanted to start showing our world in a more arts based way. The traditional catwalk just seemed so limiting".

== Artwork ==
"Recognised internationally as a cult fashion label, ericaamerica has also been garnering attention in the art world." By turning their attentions to installation based artwork and other forms of expression not traditional to fashion ericaamerica "have bridged the divide between art and fashion. Their exhibitions of new designs, which they show on both in art galleries and catwalks around the world, present a whole art experience". The label has featured in numerous group and solo exhibitions including: Fashion Moments, Art Moments Gallery, Bondi (2006) Viva Le Incroyables, Australian Centre for the Moving Image, Melbourne (2004) Mine Own Executioner, Mundaring Arts Centre (2003) Graphicalogistics, Touring nationally, (2001) Art in Bloom, Art Gallery of Western Australia (2002) Looking Out, John Curtin Gallery, Western Australia (2008) and Innovators 4: Linden 1968, Linden Centre for Contemporary Arts, St Kilda Victoria (2008).

Ericaamerica's gallery oriented work has seen the pair employ a multiplicity of disciplines. With a focus on immersive installation and diorama inspired work with a strong reference to the world of museums and the naturalist science of the Victorian period, the label creates "human taxidermy" that works not only with garment but with custom made furniture, machinery, decorative objects and the development of new textiles techniques. Both Looking Out (John Curtin Gallery, 2008) and the Linden 1968 exhibition (Linden Centre For Contemporary Arts, 2008) saw the ericaamerica team create interactive three-dimensional installations completely in sepia tone.

The pair have also embarked on a series of artistic collaborative initiatives with other well known contemporary artists. The label is still continually engaged in these projects having created costumes for the show "Bio Kino: The Living Screen" by internationally renowned Bio-art collective SymbioticA. The duo also designed the costume for the "Harlequin Suit" performance surgery of renowned French artist Orlan.

In the recent exhibition A Cave of Wonders at the Western Australian Museum, ericaamerica developed an installation in conjunction with an exhibition of the work of singer/songwriter Nick Cave, creating a work that was "part church, part museum and part curiosity show". Like the Looking Out and Linden 1968 shows A Cave of Wonders was both a critical and commercial success, being described by critics as "a unique work - a poetic meeting of the romantic rogue aesthetic of both ericaamerica and Nick Cave"
