= Taryn Onofaro =

Australian television presenter (born 1979)

Taryn Onofaro is an Australian television presenter. Born 10 October 1979 in Perth, Western Australia, she attended the Western Australian Academy of Performing Arts. During her time there, she worked on Perth breakfast radio and also contributed to the now defunct Access 31 community television station.

After graduating from WAAPA, she produced the Showcase WA show for Access 31, which eventually led to her gaining a role on Channel 9's Y? program. She then moved on to Queensland Escapes, but before the show began airing on Channel 9, she was recruited by the Seven Network to work on The Great South East, Creek to Coast, and Queensland Weekender. For a period of time, she appeared on both shows, which occupied the same timeslot. Additionally, Taryn hosted the Queensland Lottery.

From 2009 to 2011, Onofaro served as a presenter on the Western Australian edition of Postcards Australia.
