= Joan Winch =

Indigenous Australian nurse (1935–2022)

- Born: Marie Joan Winch; 9 June 1935; Perth, Western Australia
- Died: 2 March 2022 (aged 86)
- Occupation(s): Nurse, educator

Marie Joan Winch (commonly known as Joan Winch, 9 June 1935 – 2 March 2022) was an Indigenous Australian nurse and educator.

== Biography ==
Winch was born on 9 June 1935 in Perth, Western Australia. Her mother died when she was 13.

She began working with the Perth Aboriginal Medical Service in 1975. She founded the Perth Aboriginal Medical Service at the Marr Mooditj college. She was awarded a PhD in Aboriginal Studies in May 2011 by the Centre for Aboriginal Studies.

Winch died on 2 March 2022.

== Awards ==
- WA Citizen of the Year: 1986
- Western Australian Aboriginal of the Year: 1987
- Australian Aboriginal of the Year: 1987
- World Health Organisation Sasakawa Award for Primary Health Care Work: 1987
- John Curtin Medal: 2008
