= DNA Tower (King's Park) =

Structure in Perth, Western Australia

Coordinates: 31°57′51.3″S 115°50′10.4″E

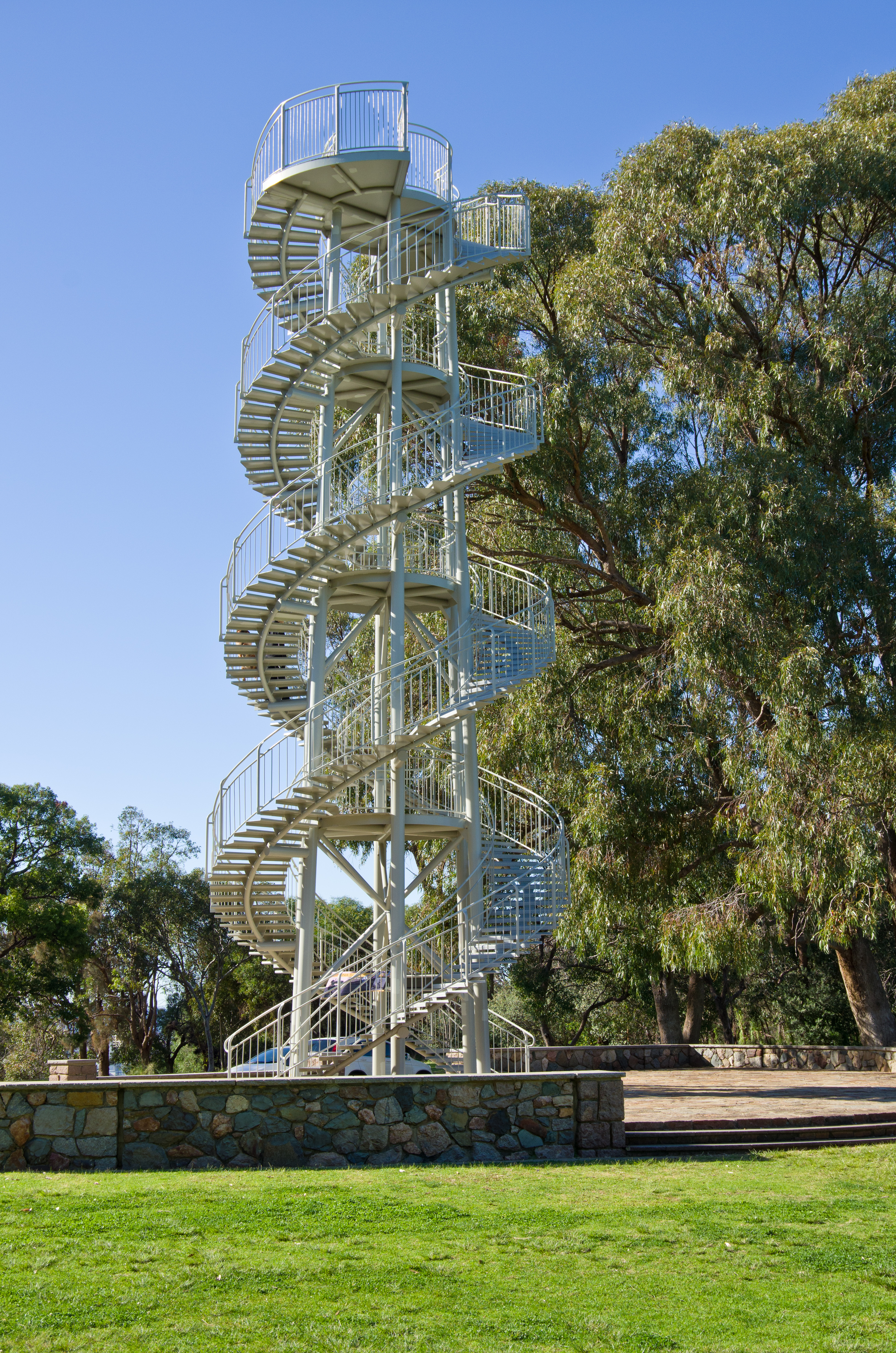
DNA Tower in 2015

The DNA Tower is a structure in Kings Park, Perth, Western Australia.

== History ==
The DNA Tower was built in 1966 by the Gradisen family, a Dutch migrant family who had migrated to Australia in 1951. The person responsible for it being built was the park's director at the time, John Beard, who was also responsible for setting up the park's botanic gardens. The double-helix design was decided upon for pragmatic reasons, for the convenience it provided for people to climb and descend the staircase.

It is built on the highest point of Kings Park on Mount Eliza, and is a white 15-metre-high (49 ft) double helix staircase with 101 steps. It was inspired by a double staircase in the Château de Blois in France. Its design resembles the deoxyribonucleic acid (DNA) molecule. The paving below the DNA Tower is made with stones sent from 11 towns and 80 shires in Western Australia.

The tower was briefly closed due to corrosion before being refurbished and repainted in 2021.

== Sources ==
- "DNA Tower". Botanic Gardens & Parks Authority. 2025.
- Budihardjo, Nadia (3 June 2021). "The Gradisens: Family behind Perth's DNA tower celebrate 70th anniversary of arrival". Stirling Times. PerthNow. Archived from the original on 16 August 2023.
- "Major refresh for Perth's Iconic DNA Tower". Dulux. 12 August 2021.
- Johansen, Mogens (20 November 2021). "DNA Tower in Kings Park reopens after first full refurbishment in 50 years". The West Australian.
- "DNA Tower Climb". Tourism Western Australia. 2025.
- Wynne, Emma (18 July 2021). "Kings Park's much-loved DNA tower to reopen after refresh". ABC News.
