= Tim McGarry (Australian actor/playwright) =

Australian actor, playwright and theatre director

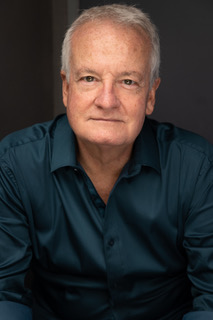
- Born: Darlinghurst, New South Wales, Australia
- Occupations: Actor; Playwright; Theatre Director
- Years active: 1985–present

Tim McGarry is an Australian actor, playwright, and theatre director.

== Early life and education ==
McGarry was born in the inner Sydney suburb of Darlinghurst and for some time he lived in the New South Wales town of Cootamundra.

The fourth of five children, he went to St Patrick's, Kogarah, and Sacred Heart Cootamundra, and completed high school at Marist College Kogarah.

McGarry started acting on stage at the age of 13 with amateur theatre groups around Sydney.

He moved to Perth in 1985 to study theatre at the Western Australian Academy of Performing Arts (WAAPA). He later studied directing through the National Institute of Dramatic Art Open Program.

== Career ==
McGarry made his professional debut in the WA State Theatre Company's production of The Sentimental Bloke

In 1989 he toured nationally in Gordon Frost's production of Big River – The Musical. He performed and toured extensively for the Wollongong-based company Theatre South, and in 1997, along with Eva Di Cesare and Sandra Eldridge, founded Monkey Baa Theatre Company. The company was incorporated in 2005. Between 2005-2017 he was a Co-Creative Director and Producer, and Monkey Baa became one of Australia's largest touring companies for young audiences.

In 2008 McGarry was one of three Australian’s selected by ASSITEJ, the International Association of Theatre for Children and Young People (a global network for professionals, making work for children and young audiences), to take part in a three-year international leadership program which saw him partake in theatre laboratories, forums and festivals in Australia, Austria, Denmark, Sweden, and Japan.

In 2009 McGarry co-adapted and performed the one man show I am Jack in over 450 performances touring extensively through Australia. In 2014 he toured the work to 17 cities throughout the USA and was interviewed by the writer Vivian Kirkfield on the subject of bullying which was the theme of the show.

In 2016 he co adapted and directed Li Cunxin's The Peasant Prince, a critically acclaimed production, winning multiple awards, A review in Australian Stage by Richard Cotter praised the writing. "Keeping the script splendidly simple and supple, writing collaborators Eva Di Cesare, Sandie Eldridge and Tim McGarry create a fluid framework.:

McGarry was instrumental in developing and presenting The Sydney Opera House's Inaugural Digital Outreach Program – co-writing and co-hosting the live feed into hundreds of regional and remote Australian classrooms reaching thousands of remote students and their teachers.

In 2018, along with his other Monkey Baa co-founders, Eva Di Cesare and Sandra Eldridge, he received a Sydney Theatre Award for 20 years of excellence and extraordinary service to the children and young people of Australia.

Also in 2018 McGarry was commissioned by Queensland Theatre to adapt Trent Dalton's best-selling novel Boy Swallows Universe. The work had its world premiere at the 2021 Brisbane Festival, and performed to sell-out houses. The Guardian review said "Boy Swallows Universe, adapted for the stage by Tim McGarry, is a gritty, raucous, and mystical juggernaut of a play that prosecutes a booming argument for the supremacy of the live theatre experience". and the play broke box office records

In 2020 McGarry was interviewed by Alice Nguyen about his stage adaptation of Margaret Wild and Jane Tanner's picture book, There's a Sea in My Bedroom as part of the "When I was Little" series.

For film and television he has appeared in ABC's Rake, All Saints, Home and Away, Underbelly-The Golden Mile, A More Fortunate Life, Hacksaw Ridge, Lilian’s Story, Manny, Goddess of 1967. He appeared in the Netflix comedy series Wellmania as Stephen Rogers (Episode 1).

His adaptation of Colleen McCullough’s novel Tim toured New South Wales in 2023. In 2025 Tim's adaptation of Trent Dalton’s Love Stories. produced by Brisbane Festival and QPAC, toured QLD, NSW, NT, ACT and New Zealand. He also created a new work Being Beethoven for CDP Theatre Producers.

His adaptation of Tim Winton’s The Shepherd’s Hut premiered in Black Swan State Theatre Company’s 2026 season. Additionally, McGarry's new musical adaptation of Nick Bland’s The Very Cranky Bear, featuring original music by Gabbi Bolt, premieres at the Sydney Opera House in December 2026 ahead of a national tour.

McGarry has sat on the MEAA's National Performers Committee, the board of Arts on Tour Ltd, and the Sydney Arts Management Advisory Group (SAMAG).

== Awards and nominations ==
- 2007 - Winner, Helpmann Awards for Hitler's Daughter (Writer)
- 2010 - Winner, Helpmann Awards for Thursday's Child (Writer)
- 2010 - Winner, Glugs Award - FOX (Writer)
- 2015 - Nomination Helpmann Award, Pete the Sheep (Writer)
- 2016 - Winner, Sydney Theatre Critics Award, Best Production for Children - The Peasant Prince, The True Story of Mao's Last Dancer (Director)
- 2016 - Winner, Glugs Award, Best Production for Children - The Peasant Prince, The True Story of Mao's Last Dancer (Director)
- 2016 - Nomination, Glugs Awards, Best Independent Production, for My Name is Asher Lev (Actor)
- 2018 - Winner, Sydney Critics Special Award - Recognition of Contribution to theatre for young audiences throughout Australia
- 2019 - Winner, Sydney Theatre Critics Award, Diary of A Wombat (Writer)

== Theatre ==
Year	Title	Role	Company
1986	The Sentimental Bloke	Various	Western Australia Theatre Company
1987	Snoopy The Musical	Linus	Hole in the Wall Perth
1989	Big River – The Musical National Tour	Young Fool	Gordon Frost
1992	John Godber's Bouncers	Various	Riverina Theatre Company
1992	Hating Alison Ashley	Lennie	Theatre South
1993	Macbeth	Various	Theatre South
1993	The Carthaginians	Paul	O’Punsky’s Theatre
1993	A Respectable Wedding	Husband	Crossroads Theatre
1994	The Time Is Not Yet Ripe	Sydney Barrett	Theatre South
1997	The Suicide	Professor	King’s Cross Theatre Company
1998	The Male Line	Bertie	Theatre South
1999	The Information	Ben Shaw	Company and Sharp Belvoir
2001	Italian Stories	Various	Theatre South
2003	Morris Gleitzman's Worry Warts	Various	Monkey Baa Theatre Company
2005	Alana Valentine's The Prospectors	Stan	Monkey Baa Theatre Company
2006	It's A Dad Thing National Tour	Tim	TML Enterprises
2006	Hitler's Daughter	Various	Monkey Baa Theatre Company
2011	I am Jack (Solo)	Various	Monkey Baa Theatre Company
2015	Coming to See Aunt Sophie	Various	Shalom/Blumenthal Prod
2016	My Name is Asher Lev	Ariyeh/Jacob	Blumenthal/Eternity Playhouse
2016	The Shadow Box	Brian	Old Fitz Theatre
2017	You Will Not Play Wagner	Morris	Blumenthal/Eternity Playhouse
2017	Cyrano de Bergerac	Rageneau	Sport for Jove
2019	The God of Isaac	Various	Blumenthal/Eternity Playhouse
2020	The Campaign	Various	White Box/ Seymour Centre
2022	Tell Me Before the Sun Explodes	Andrew	KXT/Rockbottom Productions
2022	Before the Meeting	Ron	White Box/Seymour Centre
2025	The Seagull	Tim McGarry	KXT/Montague Basement

== Film and television ==
Year	Title	Role	Company
1991	A More Fortunate Life	Dad/Brother	Theatre Ink
1995	Lilian's Story	Bus Driver	CML Films
2000	Goddess of 1967	Detective	Clara Law Films
2004	All Saints	Garth Wilkinson	Seven Network
2006	All Saints	Tony	Seven Network
2009	Underbelly 3	Peter Thompson	UB III Pty Ltd
2011	Sex: An Unnatural History	Colonist	SBS TV
2015	Manny Lewis	Doctor	Beyond Screen
2016	Hacksaw Ridge	Local Man	Cross Creek Pictures
2016	Home and Away	Funeral Celebrant	Seven Network
2017	Risen	Home Owner	Opening Acts Films
2018	Rake (season 5)	Seth Gilbert	ABC TV
2022	Wellmania	Steven Rogers	Freemantle Media/Netflix

== Directing ==
Year	Title	Company
2013	Swing Baby Swing	Sydney Opera House Family Program
2014	The Nutcracker	Sydney Opera House Family Program
2016	The Peasant Prince	Monkey Baa Theatre Company
2018	Sounds Like Australia	Sydney Opera House Family Program
2019	Music for the Dreaming	Sydney Opera House Family Program
2020	There's a Sea in my Bedroom	Australian Chamber Orchestra
2022	Dear Santa	Australian Chamber Orchestra
2024	Princess and the Pea and the Brave Escapee	Australian Chamber Orchestra
2026	Pinocchio, a Nose Knows	Australian Chamber Orchestra

== Published works ==
A number of McGarry’s adaptations have been published including:

- 2007 Jackie French's Hitler’s Daughter – Currency Press
- 2010 Morris Gleitzman's Worry Warts - Playlab Press
- 2011 Sonya Hartnett's Thursday’s Child
- 2015 Jackie French's Pete The Sheep – Currency Press
- 2018 Li Cunxin's The Peasant Prince – Currency Press
- 2022 Trent Dalton's Boy Swallows Universe – Harper Collins/Fourth Estate
- 2023 Colleen McCullough's Tim – Currency Press
