= Vivien Carter =

Australian actress, singer and dancer

- Born: Australia
- Education: Western Australian Academy of Performing Arts (WAAPA)
- Known for: Musical Theatre

Vivien Carter is an Australian actress, singer and dancer. She is probably best known for playing Velma Kelly in Chicago at the Cambridge Theatre, London.

== Early life ==
Carter was born in Australia and trained in acting, singing and dancing at the Western Australian Academy of Performing Arts (WAAPA), Perth. While there she appeared in productions of Nick Enright's Spurboard, The Crucible, Perfectly Frank, and Fiddler on the Roof. Carter graduated from WAAPA in 2003.

== Work before Chicago ==
- 2004–5 We Will Rock You, touring Australia and Japan
- 2006 Guys and Dolls, directed by Michael Grandage, the Donmar Warehouse production at the Piccadilly Theatre: Swing
- 2007 Evita, directed by Michael Grandage, Adelphi Theatre: Ensemble
- 2007 Eurobeat: Almost Eurovision (premiere), Edinburgh Fringe Festival, Pleasance Grand, Edinburgh.
- 2008 Oklahoma!, Kilworth House, Leicestershire
- 2008 Like Other People Do by Alex Kelly (short film)

== Chicago ==
In the summer of 2008, Vivien Carter joined the long-running production of Chicago in the West End. She played the role of June ("Squish") for ten months and Liz ("Pop") for a further nine months. From 26 April 2010 until 5 February 2011, Carter played Velma Kelly, having originally been offered the role for just six weeks.

Carter's portrayal of Velma was well-received. Matt Wolf at theartsdesk.com opined that "Vivien Carter ... [offers] a crisply enunciated, sardonic, commandingly slithery take on the part...: a take-no-prisoners belter of a woman. ... A welcome Australian presence on the West End, Carter has a knack for seeming to sneer while she sings, all the while winning us over with her feral, feline command. On this evidence, she deserves to open a show so that the critical community can take proper note of her talents."

Sian Meades, at lastminute.com, posited that "Vivien Carter, playing Velma Kelly, is one of the best actresses I’ve seen on stage in recent years. Her command of the stage, and the rest of the cast was nothing short of fabulous. Whenever she was on stage, you noticed her. Even if she wasn’t doing anything. When she danced, you watched. When she sang, you were rooting for her. She was the star of the show for me."

== Work since Chicago ==
- 2011 Pub Plays (Trade and The New Black) and The Joy of Text, High Tide Festival
- 2011 (26 June) When You Hear My Voice, the fourth Tim Williams Awards concert, at the Cochrane Theatre. Carter performed A Poison Tree, an adaptation of the poem by William Blake, with original music by Corin Buckeridge (musical director of Chicago).

=== Radio Times ===
In autumn 2011, Carter appeared as Forces' sweetheart Amy Chapman in the Noel Gay musical Radio Times at the Watermill Theatre, opposite Anna-Jane Casey and Gary Wilmot. As well as singing and dancing, Carter played saxophone, ukulele and kazoo. On 1 September 2011 Andrew Lloyd Webber was in the audience and gave the cast a standing ovation.

Radio Times received five stars in The Public Reviews. Carter's performance was also praised:

"Vivien Carter, as Amy, smolders, seduces, sings, dances, plays and ends up with real heart." - Jim Nicholson at The Public Reviews

"Vivien Carter [is] a forces sweetheart to rival Vera Lynn." - Judi Herman at WhatsOnStage

"[Vivien Carter as] the loveable Amy, the forces sweetheart who oozed sexuality." - Robin Strapp at The British Theatre Guide

The show also toured, ending with a week at the Theatre Royal, Plymouth. Sara Crowe took over in the role of Olive.
