= Jarrod Carland =

Australian creative director

Jarrod Carland is an Australian creative director, establishing design agency Studio Jack in 2008. He has also been involved in the entertainment industry as a producer, working on a variety of events and productions, from festivals to musical theatre productions and large scale concert events.

Prior to 2008, Carland trained and worked in general management with Laura Green in New York on Broadway, working on the Broadway productions of The Producers and Hairspray, culminating in working as assistant to Mel Brooks for the Broadway production and cast recording of The New Mel Brooks Musical: Young Frankenstein, which opened on Broadway on November 8, 2007.

From 2013 to 2016, he was executive director of the critically acclaimed music festival Brisbane Baroque (formerly Hobart Baroque), in association with QPAC. The festival was nominated for 20 Helpmann Awards over the four years it existed, winning 10 awards, including Best Opera for Faramondo in 2015 and Agrippina in 2016. The festival did not continue past its fourth year due to mounting costs and low box office sales, and was placed into voluntary liquidation after its second year in Brisbane due to debts owed. Carland was reported to have been admitted to a mental health facility for care.

Prior to working in New York, Carland performed for a number of years, best known for musical theatre roles such as Raoul, Vicomte de Chagny in The Phantom of the Opera, Munkustrap in Cats, Danny Zuko in Grease, and Steve Baker in Show Boat at London's Royal Albert Hall, to name a few.

He graduated with a BA in musical theatre from the Western Australian Academy of Performing Arts (WAAPA), in Perth, Western Australia.
