= ECU City =

University campus in Perth, Western Australia

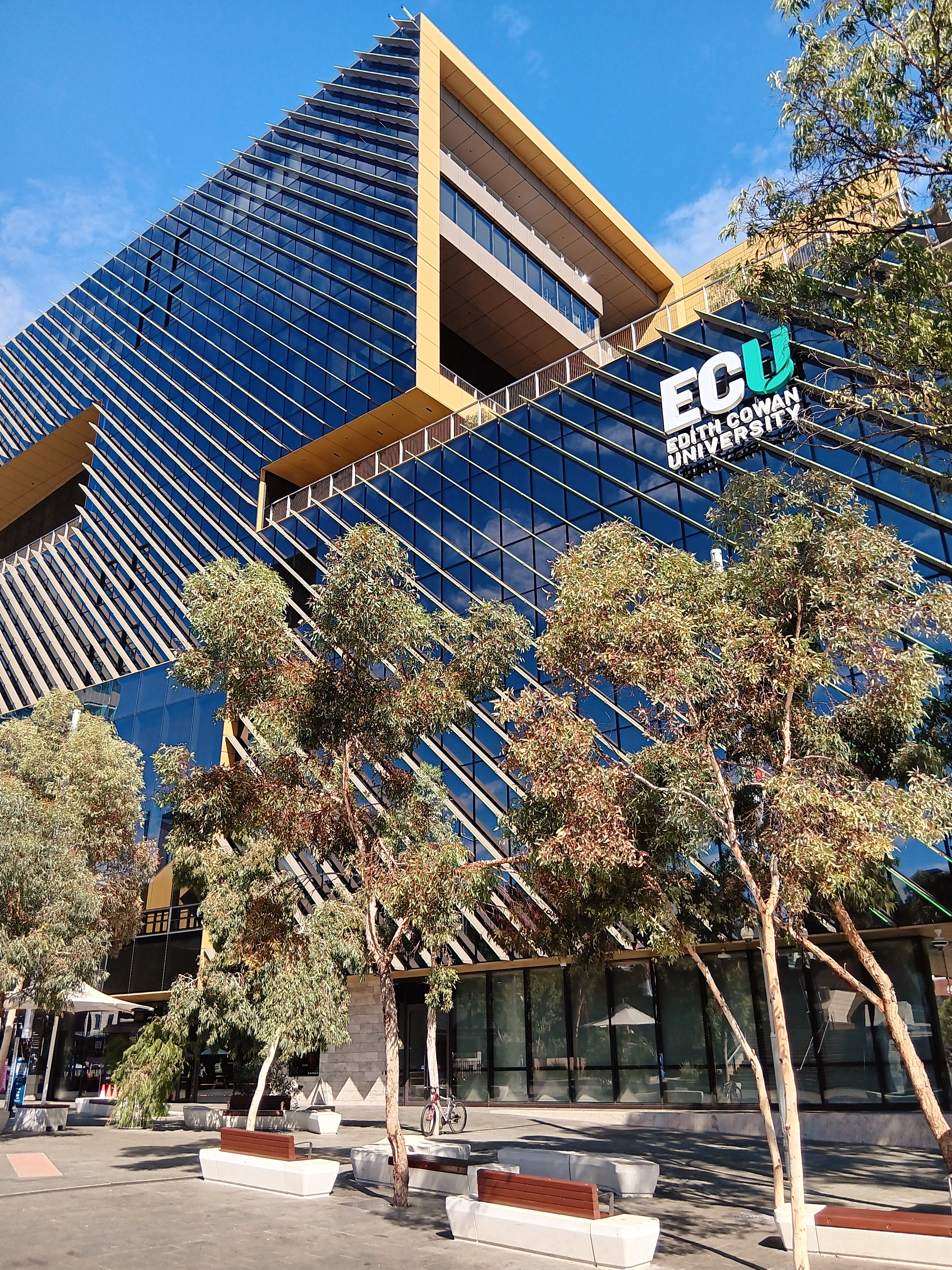
- ECU City from Yagan Square

General information
- Type: University campus
- Location: Perth, Western Australia, 500 Wellington Street
- Coordinates: 31.9506°S 115.8574°E
- Opened: 13 February 2026
- Cost: A$853 million
- Owner: Edith Cowan University

Design and construction
- Architecture firm: Lyons; Silver Thomas Hanley; Haworth Tompkins

ECU City is a university campus of Edith Cowan University located in Perth, Australia. The inner city campus is situated at the Perth City Link, immediately west of Yagan Square. It is located directly on top of the Perth Busport and is near Perth railway station. The campus opened in February 2026, with around 8,500 students and staff expected to be based there from semester one and that number is expected to grow to 10,000.

== Schools and facilities ==
The 11-storey 6-hectare (15-acre) campus was built on 0.8 hectares (1.98 acres) of land. The campus serves as the home to the Western Australian Academy of Performing Arts, one of Australia's major arts training institutions, along with the School of Business and Law, the School of Arts and Humanities, the WA Screen and Media Academy, and the university's Centre for Indigenous Australian Education and Research, Kurongkurl Katitjin.

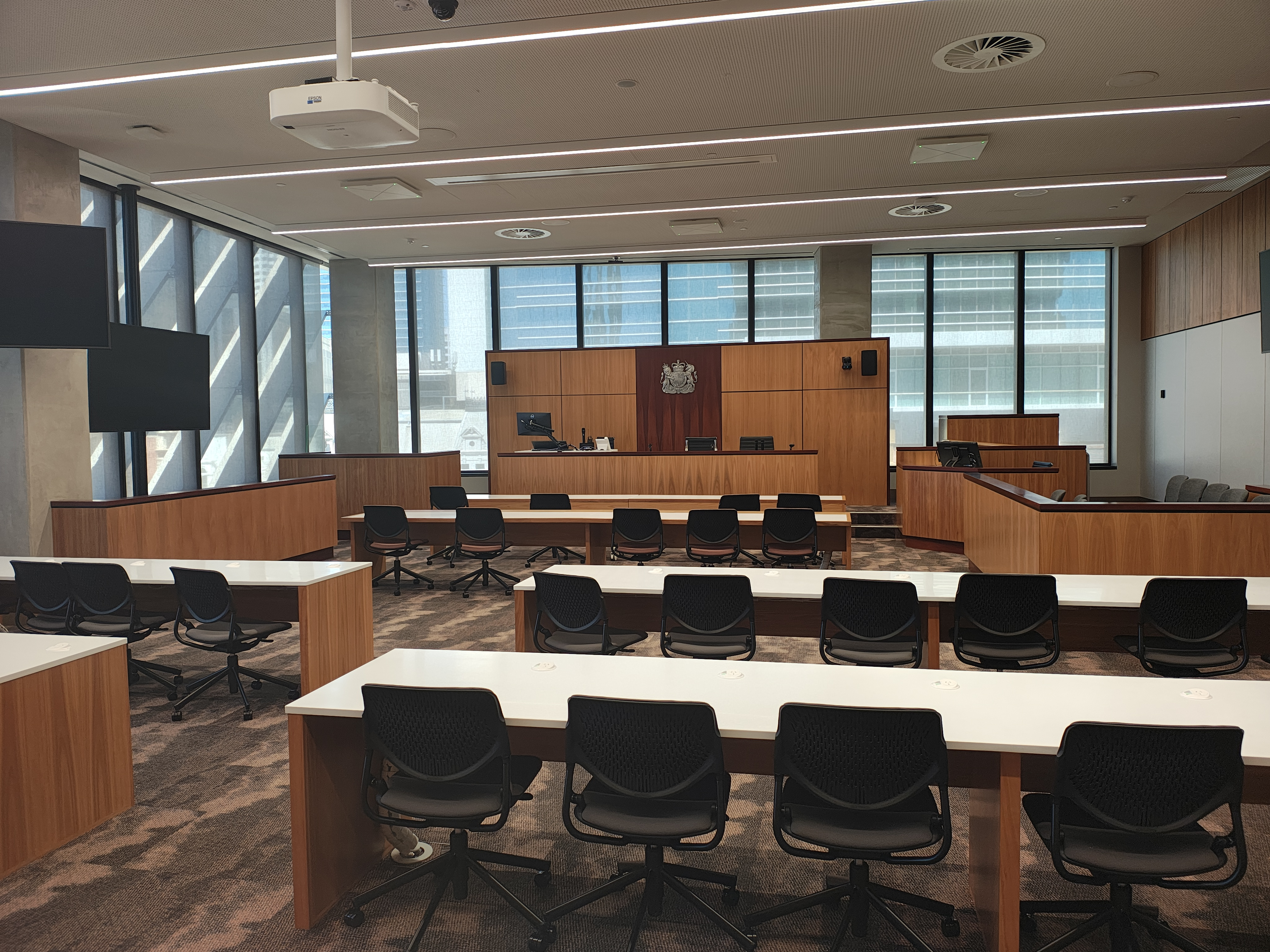
Moot court at ECU City

The campus features a two-level study hub, extensive media training facilities, public galleries and event spaces, a cyber-security centre, and a moot court to stage mock legal trials with an audience gallery. The Western Australian Academy of Performing Arts is based at the internal Minderoo Centre for Performance Excellence, which features eight public performance venues that will also host shows from visiting artists and performers.

The campus also features an internal staircase inspired by brass wind and timber string instruments. The exterior of the building features a number of outdoor terraces and a network of 2,800 custom LED fixtures, which illuminates Yagan Square with video displays.

== History ==
The city campus project was first suggested at a Perth city summit in 2017.

The campus was announced as a part of the A$1.5-billion Perth City Deal in 2020. In August 2021, the city campus design was unveiled, designed by architecture firms Lyons, Silver Thomas Hanley, and Haworth Tompkins. The project was approved by DevelopmentWA in December 2021. It was initially expected to open in 2025 at a cost of A$695 million, but ultimately a total budget of A$853 million was devoted for the entire development of the city campus project, with the Australian Federal Government committing A$294 million, the Western Australian State Government investing A$199 million and the university contributing A$360 million.

Construction of ECU City was delivered by Multiplex. It was expected to begin in the second quarter of 2022; however construction ultimately kicked off in February 2023 and ended in late 2025 for an intended 2026 commencement of classes. The campus was officially opened on 13 February 2026.

As a consequence of the opening of ECU City, the university's existing campus at Mount Lawley ceased classes in late 2025, with many of the courses and faculty based there (such as the Western Australian Academy of Performing Arts) moving to the new facility. In addition, the School of Business and Law moved into the new campus from Edith Cowan University's existing campus at Joondalup, while the School of Education consolidated its Mount Lawley operations into the Joondalup campus.

== Reception ==
The reception to ECU City has been generally positive despite some controversies. A number of government ministers expressed a positive attitude towards the city campus project, citing economic benefits to the city.

In 2021, Patrick Gorman suggested that offering degrees at the campus might be too expensive for some prospective students. However, he described the campus as a "world class campus" and “nation-building project” in 2025.

Concerns have also been raised over potential student housing shortages, given the shortfall of accommodation in the city as of the campus' opening in February 2026.

== Controversies ==
In December 2025, it was reported that asbestos was found in 14 fire doors at the city campus. ECU will not replace the affected doors until breaks in teaching during 2026, after given approval by WorkSafe.

On 18 August 2026, ABC Perth reported that a student with a disability was forced to drop out because of parking challenges and accessibility issues at the city campus, given there is no on-site parking for students and staff.
