= Tjyllyungoo =

Australian artist

Tjyllyungoo is the traditional name of the landscape painter Lance Chadd, a Noongar man from Western Australia. Tjyllyungoo's paintings are internationally recognised and held in a number of collections.

Born in 1954, he grew up in the south-west regional town of Bunbury, located within Noongar country. He began painting professionally, in 1981, without having taken formal training. His unique realistic style is akin to those of Hans Heysen and Albert Namatjira, to whose work he was introduced at an early age. His uncles Alan Kelly and Reynold Hart were also fine landscape painters at the Carrolup Mission settlement.

While his work is identified with Indigenous Australian art, his paintings are imbued with these traditional influences through his depiction of the landscapes in his country. In contrast to indigenous abstractions, also recognised internationally, his work is well received by those without a knowledge of the cultural or spiritual beliefs of the Noongar people.

== Works ==
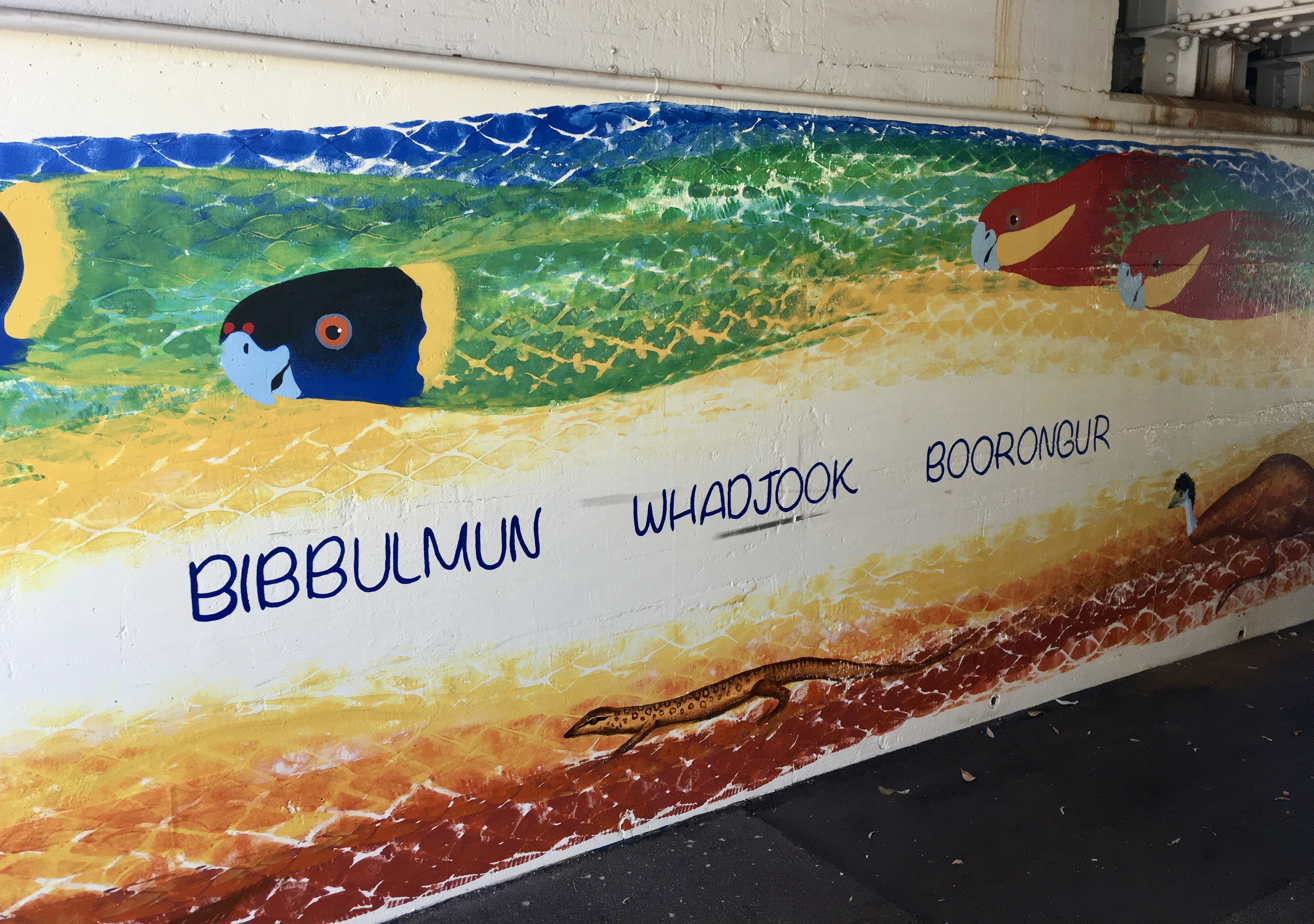
2021 mural by Tjyllyungoo et al at Karrakatta railway station

Tjyllyungoo's work has been exhibited at the Gomboc Gallery, a large private gallery in Western Australia. Works are retained in collections around the world, by the Art Gallery of Western Australia, and within the Berndt Collection.

He designed the statue "Wirin" in Yagan Square.
