= Western Australian of the Year Awards =

Annual awards in Western Australia

The Western Australian of the Year Awards (previously the WA Citizen of the Year Awards) are annually awarded to individuals who have made an outstanding and enduring contribution to the advancement of the state and people of Western Australia. The awards are presented by Celebrate WA, a not-for-profit organisation responsible for promoting and organising the annual Western Australia Day celebrations.

The awards have been given every year since 1973. The awards were originally known as the WA Citizen of the Year Awards, and included categories for organisations as well as individuals. The awards were renamed in 2012, when Foundation Day was renamed to Western Australia Day.

Worthy individuals and organisations may be nominated by fellow West Australians and cannot nominate themselves. Awards have been given in various categories including Aboriginal, Arts and Culture, Business, Community, Professions, Sport, Youth, Epic Achievement Award, Spirit of WA, Lifetime Achievement, and Inspiring Leadership. Award recipients may choose to use the post-nominal CitWA after their name.

Past recipients include: Tim Winton, St John Ambulance, Sir Charles Court, Fiona Wood, the Department of Health, ericaamerica designer Lucas Bowers, Wally Foreman, Mili Davies and Joan Winch.
