= Tourism Western Australia =

Statutory authority promoting Western Australia

Logo

Tourism Western Australia is the statutory authority responsible for promoting Western Australia as a tourist destination.

Its earlier predecessors included the Department of Tourism and the Tourism Commission. The change to the current name was in June 2004. The separate industry based organisation is known as the Tourism Council of Western Australia, which works to promote the annual Western Australian Tourism Awards.

== See also ==
- Tourism Australia
- Tourism in Australia
