= Yagan Square =

Public space in Perth, Western Australia

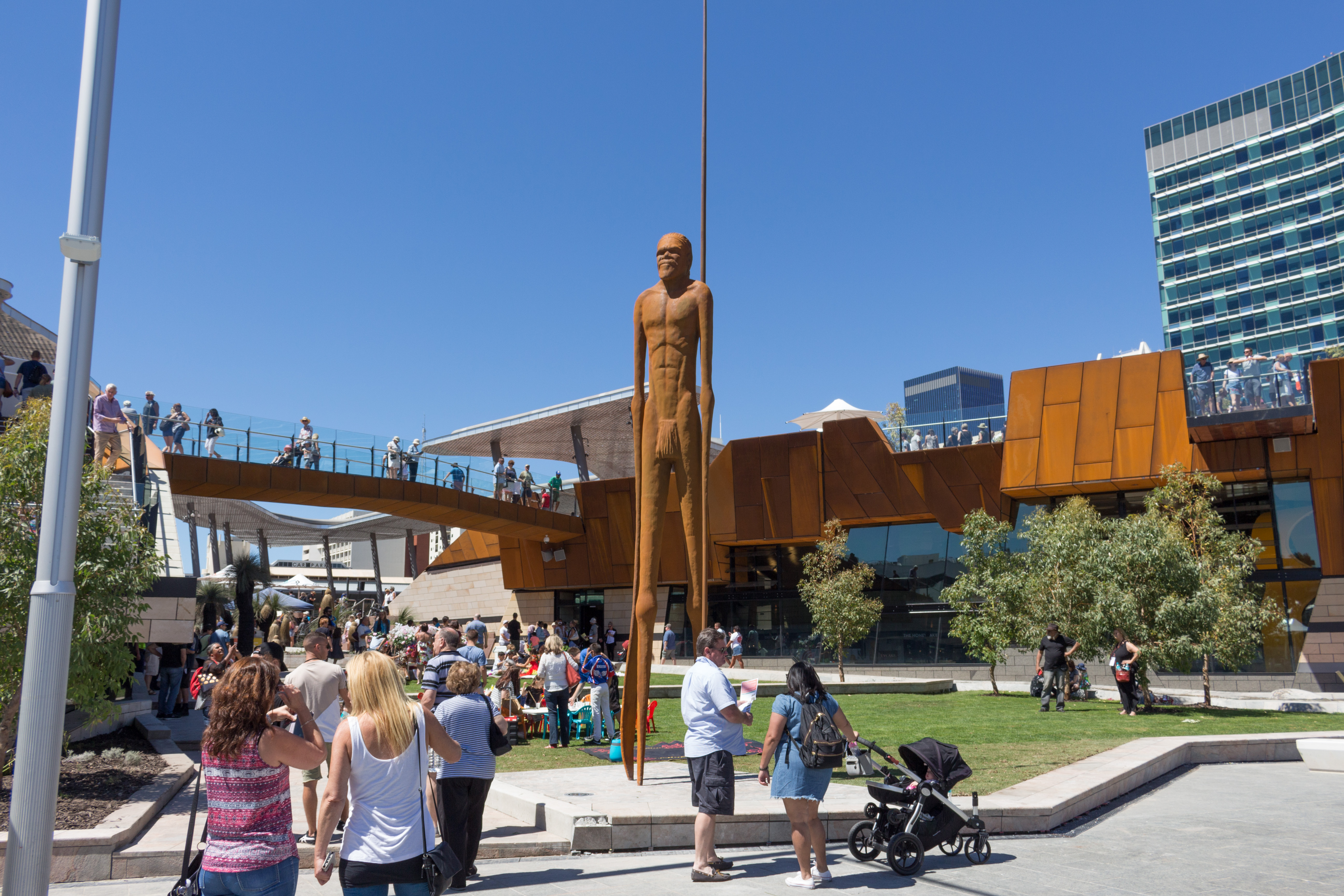
- "Wirin" by artist Tjyllyungoo
- Interactive map of Yagan Square
- Namesake: Yagan
- Area: 1.1 ha (2.7 acres)
- Location: City of Perth
- Coordinates: 31°57′02″S 115°51′31″E
- North end: Northbridge
- South end: Central business district
- North: Roe Street
- East: Horseshoe Bridge
- South: Wellington Street
- West: ECU City

Construction
- Construction start: February 2016
- Inauguration: 3 March 2018; 8 years ago

Other
- Status: Pedestrian
- Website: Official website

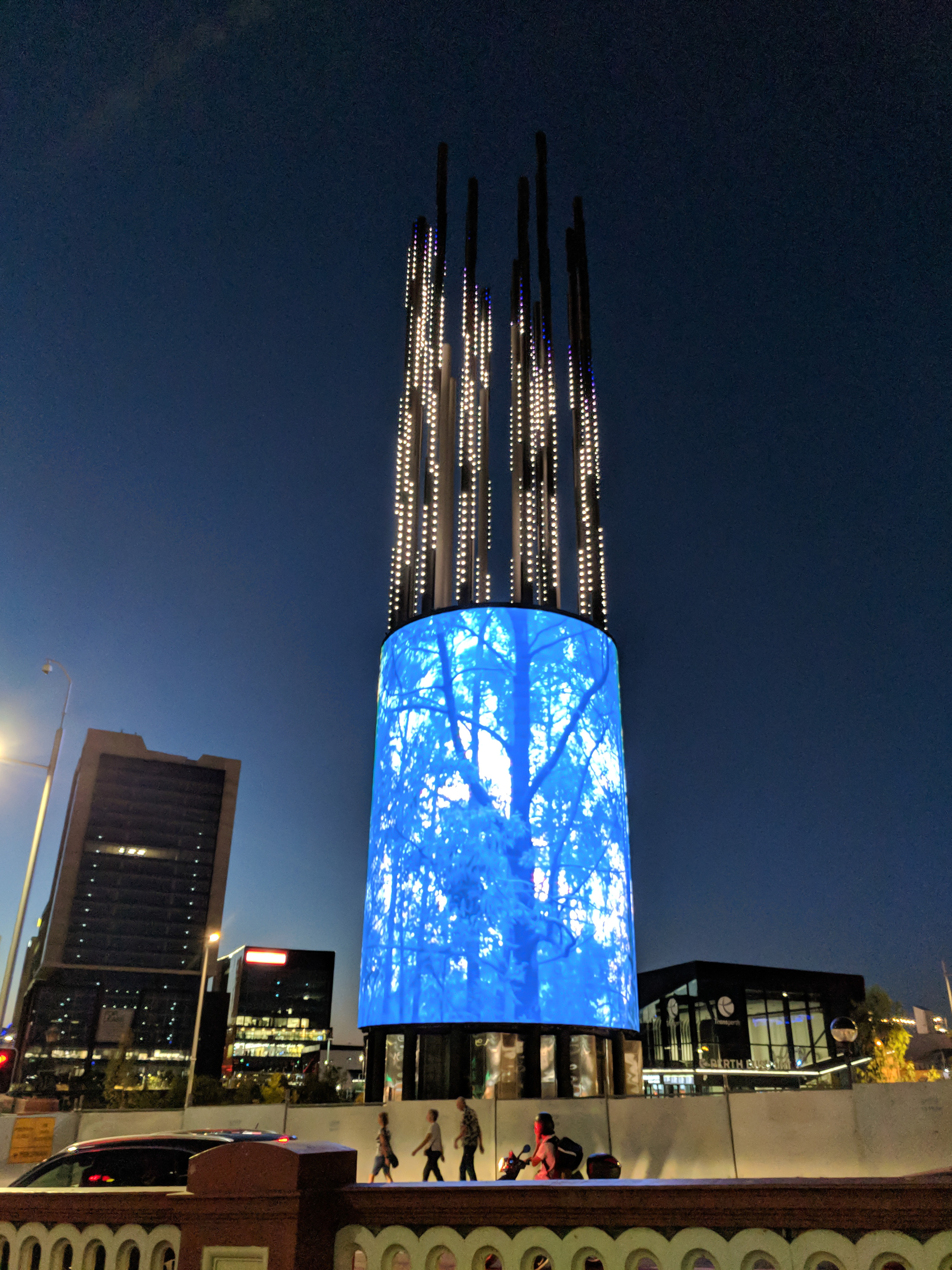
The digital tower at Yagan Square

Yagan Square is a public space and a component of the Perth City Link in Perth, Western Australia. It is situated between the Horseshoe Bridge and the ECU City campus in the eastern part of the Perth City Link precinct, occupying 1.1 hectares (2.7 acres). It is named after the Aboriginal warrior Yagan.

== Description ==
The design of Yagan Square has taken into account its place of significance to the indigenous people on whose land it was built, the Noongar people of Perth, as well as the lakes that used to exist under what is now the Perth railway station and Wellington Street. The square has pedestrian access points from Roe Street in the north, Karak Walk to the west, Wellington Street to the south and from the Horseshoe Bridge to the east, with direct access from Perth railway station to Yagan Square under the Horseshoe Bridge in the south-east of the precinct. To its immediate west is Edith Cowan University's multi-storey inner city campus, ECU City, as well as the eastern passenger entrance to the underground Perth Busport.

On the south-western corner of Yagan Square is a 45-metre-high (148 ft) "digital tower", with a wrap-around display screen 30 metres (98 ft) in width and 14 metres (46 ft) in height. Fourteen columns rising from the middle of the tower represent the fourteen Noongar language groups. The tower is primarily used to display advertising, but has also been used to display artwork and short films, as well as livestreamed events such as the AFL Grand Final and other sporting events, a satellite launch in 2021, and a solar eclipse in 2023. After the abduction of Cleo Smith in October 2021, images of the missing child were displayed on the tower as part of the public appeal for information. A sign consisting of 2-metre-high (6.6 ft) capital letters spelling out "Perth" sits at the base of the tower, facing into the square. The sign is lit at night and often decorated for special occasions, and is a popular photo opportunity for visitors.

Facing William Street, a 9-metre (30 ft) statue "Wirin", designed by Noongar artist Tjyllyungoo, represents the "sacred force of creative power that connects all life of boodja (mother earth)". "Waterline", a 190-metre-long (620 ft) water feature designed by artist Jon Tarry, flows through the space, and Yagan Square also boasts a small grassed area and wildflower garden.

Taking up most of the eastern half of Yagan Square is a 1000-person capacity outdoor amphitheatre shaded by a light-up digital canopy in the shape of the former Lakes Kingsford and Irwin that once existed in the area. The amphitheatre has been host to concerts, live performances, film screenings, and public exercise classes. The amphitheatre is flanked to the north and south by two buildings containing food and beverage outlets: the Horseshoe Lane building and the Stories hospitality complex, which also contains a children's playground.

== History ==
Yagan Square sits on the former site of surface level rail lines and passenger platforms that had run underneath the Horseshoe Bridge, west of the main Perth railway station terminal building. These rail lines were sunk and the platforms demolished during 2012 and 2013 as part of the Perth City Link project.

Plans for the site were first unveiled in November 2014. Construction of the square began in February 2016, and it was opened on 3 March 2018.

The Stories hospitality complex was originally known as the Market Hall, which initially opened alongside the Horseshoe Lane building and the rest of the precinct and featured a children's playground and water play area on its upper level. Although both original buildings had been praised for their architectural design, after opening the larger Market Hall saw a gradual exodus of tenants due to lower than expected visitor numbers caused by the building's indirect pedestrian access and mediocre visibility for the businesses inside, with some branding the Market Hall a "ghost town" and a "white elephant". Acknowledging the failure of the initial configuration of the Market Hall, the state government considered reconfiguring the space for other uses such as a farmer's market, before announcing in October 2022 that the Market Hall will undergo what ultimately became a A$16 million redevelopment into a five-level hospitality complex consisting of a number of bars and restaurants with a total capacity of over 4000 patrons. The Stories hospitality complex, which gutted the original Market Hall and added an additional two storeys to the existing structure, opened in April 2024.

The adjacent A$853 million ECU City development commenced construction in February 2023. It was completed in late 2025 for classes to begin in 2026.

In September 2026, a deliberately lit fire badly damaged the Perth sign at the base of the digital tower.
