= History of the National Broadband Network =

The National Broadband Network had its origins in 2006 when the Federal Labor Opposition led by Kim Beazley committed the Australian Labor Party, if elected to government to a 'super-fast' national broadband network. Initial attempts to engage key businesses in Australian telecommunications in planning and development; and implementation and operation failed with NBN Co being set up in 2010 to have carriage of the 'largest infrastructure' project in Australia's history.

Completion of the project is anticipated to be in the early 2020s.

== 2006–2007 ==
=== Pre-2007 federal election ===
On 11 August 2005 Sol Trujillo, the newly appointed CEO of Telstra, gave his first presentation, "The Digital Compact & National Broadband Plan: Enabling Regulatory Reform" to both the Howard government and select investors. Australian Securities Exchange continuous disclosure rules forced the presentation to be shared with all investors, published on Telstra & ASX sites. This is one of the earliest uses of "National Broadband Plan", the origin of the $4.7 billion of Government equity to build a 12 Mbit/s FTTN NBN, "94% Rural" and "99% Urban". There were two other proposed options, for 6 Mbit/s for $2.6B and 1.5 Mbit/s for $1.1B. [PDF page 47 of TLS-339, pg 15 of "National Broadband Plan" slides.]

The opposition Labor Party proposed that if elected, it would commence the construction of a 'super fast' national broadband network (NBN). The initial proposal would see fibre to the node (FTTN) technology for 98% of Australian households with a minimum speed of 12 Mbit/s, and the remaining 2% would "have improved broadband services". The network was initially estimated to cost A$15 billion including a government contribution of A$4.7 billion which would be raised in part by selling the Federal Government's remaining shares in Telstra.

The Howard government's $2 billion broadband plan would see regional areas to get WiMAX wireless and ADSL2+ broadband. At no cost to the tax-payers, the private sector would tender to build a FTTN broadband network in built-up areas capable of delivering internet speeds of up to 50 Mbit/s.

=== 2007 Federal election ===
The Labor Party won the November 2007 federal election, and the Rudd government was sworn into office on 3 December. Soon afterwards, Senator Stephen Conroy announced the newly elected government's commitment to building a national high-speed broadband FTTN network.

== 2008 ==
=== Initial Request for Proposal ===
Request for Proposal (RFP) to build the NBN issued, compliant proposals were received from Acacia, Axia NetMedia, Optus on behalf of Terria, TransACT and the Government of Tasmania (covering their respective states only), a non-compliant proposal was received from Telstra and they were excluded from consideration.

There were suggestions that if the project were to go ahead, Telstra's exclusion could lead to them being entitled to compensation estimated at A$15–20 billion.

Bidders who lodged compliant proposals were neither able to meet the government's requirements nor able to raise the necessary capital during the Great Recession, the RFP was terminated on 7 April 2009.

== 2009 ==
After terminating its initial RFP, the Rudd Government announced it would bypass the existing copper network by constructing a new national network combining fibre to the premises (FTTP), fixed wireless and satellite technologies. The FTTP rollout was planned to reach approximately 93% of premises in Australia by June 2021.

For each percentage point of coverage above 93%, FTTP build costs become prohibitive because of a low population density. However, the FTTP footprint could be expanded where users or communities were willing to pay the incremental costs of installing FTTP.

The FTTP rollout was to gradually replace the copper network then owned by Telstra and used for most telephone and data services. As part of an agreement with NBN Co, Telstra was to move its customers to the NBN, and lease space in its telephone exchanges and access to its extensive network ducting.

Tasmania was selected for a trial deployment based on the Tasmanian Government's submission to the RFP.

At the same time, the federal government threatened to force a structural separation of Telstra.

=== Initial expected cost and payback ===
The Rudd Government estimated to the capital expenditure of the project initially to be A$43 billion. NBN Co later revised down the cost in its business plan to A$37.4 billion. The project was to be financed by a combination of a Federal Government investment of A$30.4 billion and private investment for the remainder.

NBN Co intends to begin paying dividends back to the Federal Government in 2021, and to have fully repaid the Government's contribution by 2034. NBN Co's business plan forecasts a return on investment of 7.1%, expecting to turnover revenue of A$23.1 billion by 2021.

=== NBN Co set up ===
NBN Co was established on 9 April 2009. Mike Quigley was appointed chief executive officer on 25 July 2009.

== 2010 ==
An implementation study was commissioned in April 2009 and released on 6 May 2010 by the Rudd Government. McKinsey & Company and KPMG concluded the NBN can be implemented and made 84 recommendations in the study, including expanding the fibre footprint to 93 per cent from the original 90 per cent.

=== NBN Co Request for tender (RFT) (April 2010) ===
In April 2010, NBN Co began a tender for the major FTTP rollout. Fourteen vendors submitted a proposal; however, NBN Co suspended the process on 1 April 2011, as the prices were 'unacceptably high'.

=== Abbott and Turnbull rejection of NBN (July–October 2010) ===
Tony Abbott, as Leader of the Opposition, and Malcolm Turnbull, as Shadow Minister for Communications, indicated in 2010 that they would 'demolish' the NBN. They argued that the demand for such a service was not significant, (Note: Statements by Abbott and Turnbull on the need for broadband: Turnbull stated that 12 Mbit/s would adequately address the need. See Tim Lohman,(28 October 2010), 12Mbps enough for all applications: Turnbull, Computerworld and Rodney Gedda, (29 October 2010), Never say 'that's enough' for any (NBN) application, Techworld Australia; Abbott argued a national LTE network could meet the need, with a tower on every street corner. See Stilgherrian, (16 August 2010), Coalition broadband: a wireless tower in every street, Crikey and Barrie Cassidy, (15 August 2010), Abbott defends Coalition's broadband plan, Insiders, ABC TV) and thus the estimated cost was too high and the timeline for implementation too long.

=== First customers (July 2010) ===
The first customers connected in July 2010.

=== 2010 election (21 August 2010) ===
3 days before the election, at the 2010 Charles Todd Memorial Oration of the Australian Computer Society, Mike Quigley attacked the Coalition broadband proposals in breach of the Caretaker conventions

2010 Australian federal election with the election of the minority Gillard government led to priority being given to regional and rural areas. Also an increase in the peak speed to one gigabit per second was announced in response to Google Fiber

=== Business plan (20 December 2010) ===
NBN Co released its business plan on 20 December 2010, including forecasts and network design.

Changes to the Business plan included an increase in the peak speed to one gigabit per second, in response to Google Fiber and giving 'priority' to regional and rural areas during the rollout following the events after the 2010 election. It has been argued that the early sites chosen for the NBN were selected due to political reasons.

=== Trial rollout in Tasmania (2010) ===
The trial rollout in Tasmania, including stage one (in red), two (in yellow), three (in green) and fibre "backbones" (in grey).

Tasmania was selected as the first state to begin the rollout of the NBN, based on the Tasmanian Government's 'shovel ready' submission to the RFP for the original NBN. A new company, NBN Tasmania (previously Tasmania NBN Co), was formed on 8 April 2009 to build the NBN in Tasmania. The company was planned to be a joint-venture between NBN Co, Aurora Energy and the Tasmanian Government. The Tasmanian Government also floated an idea to invest A$12.7 million in Aurora Energy to get access to its fibre network; however, the joint-venture and deal were both cancelled on 9 November 2010 when the negotiations reached an impasse. Although the joint-venture was cancelled, Aurora Energy still plays a role in the construction of the NBN in Tasmania.

The trial rollout in Tasmania comprises three stages. Stage one was announced in July 2009 with the first customers being connected a year later. Stage one included connections to premises in Smithton, Scottsdale and Midway Point and construction of fibre 'backbones' from Port Latta to Smithton, Cambridge to Midway Point, Midway Point to Triabunna, George Town to Scottsdale and Scottsdale to St Helens. On completion of stage one, 4,000 premises were offered fibre installation; 51 agreed to be 'NBN Ready' (at no cost), but only 10.9% actually took up the service. As of 6 May 2011, 712 premises had an active service and 11 premises were awaiting service activation by a retail service provider (RSP).

The Tasmanian Parliament passed opt-out legislation on 18 November 2010, to allow NBN Co to install fibre connections to premises unless the property owners explicitly decline the installation. The fibre connection is free, however, if the installation is declined and a connection is ordered at a later date, NBN Co may charge a connection fee. The bill passed the Tasmanian lower house with the support of all members.

During his second reading speech, Premier of Tasmania David Bartlett said the take-up rates were 'a good early result'; however, he said it was 'important to increase the participation rate'. In his closing remarks, Bartlett said '[the] NBN in Tasmania is a once-in-a-generation opportunity to create jobs and contribute to a new economic direction'. In her second reading speech on behalf of the Tasmanian Opposition, Elise Archer said 'the NBN is an important infrastructure', but that 'the State Liberals have some concern that the NBN business model seems to rely more and more on eliminating competition and other technologies'.

Stages two and three were announced on 21 October 2009 and 1 March 2010, respectively. Approximately 11,150 premises in Sorell, Deloraine, George Town, St Helens, Triabunna, Kingston Beach and South Hobart were included in stage two. Stage three includes approximately 90,000 premises in Hobart, Launceston, Devonport and Burnie. Stage two will include a trial of expanding the FTTP footprint to areas not included in the initial rollout. The trial will allow individuals and councils to pay the incremental cost of a fibre connection over fixed wireless in order to receive a fibre connection from NBN Co. The costs will include provisioning further space in exchanges and rolling out additional fibre optic cables.

At the time of launch, the access prices for RSPs were temporarily set at a flat rate of A$300 per premises with no ongoing monthly charges. Mike Quigley said one of the reasons for the flat rate is the OSS and BSS systems was not built to make the process automatic. He continued if NBN Co charged a monthly charge without the systems, it would have been a 'very manually intensive process' and not a 'sensible proposition'. However, RSPs did charge a monthly fee to customers, to cover the cost of the trial.

Of the first 4000 residences in Hobart, only 10.9% have actually taken up a service. However, as part of the agreement with Telstra is to decommission the existing copper network as the NBN becomes available, this is not considered as representative of the ultimate NBN adoption by customers.

== 2011 ==
=== National Broadband Network Companies Act 2011 (28 March 2011) ===
The Parliament passed the National Broadband Network Companies Act 2011 and a related bill on 28 March 2011 with amendments by the Greens and independent senators adopted on 26 March 2011. The amendments centred around transparency, freedom of information and competition concerns, including the adoption of uniform national wholesale prices for NBN connections. The Government has required support from the Greens to pass NBN legislation through the Parliament. The Greens have voted in favour of NBN legislation, but have also won support for amendments that make NBN Co subject to freedom of information laws, and that make any proposal to privatise the NBN subject to review by the Parliament and by the Productivity Commission.

=== NBN Co Request for tender of April 2010 terminated (1 April 2011) ===
Fourteen vendors submitted a proposal; however, NBN Co suspended the process on 1 April 2011, as the prices were 'unacceptably high'.

=== Principal contractor agreement with Silcar (1 June 2011) ===
NBN Co entered into an agreement worth up to A$380 million with Silcar on 1 June 2011. The agreement covered the construction of the NBN in Queensland, New South Wales and the Australian Capital Territory by Silcar, a company joint-owned by Siemens and Thiess. The agreement also includes the option of a two-year extension with an additional value of A$740 million.

=== Agreement with Telstra (23 June 2011) ===
NBN Co signed an agreement with Telstra on 23 June 2011 estimated to be worth A$9 billion post-tax net present value, building upon the signing of a financial heads of agreement a year beforehand.

Instead of separating wholesale and retail operations, Telstra agreed to 'disconnect' its Internet customers from the copper and hybrid fibre-coaxial networks in areas where FTTP has been installed, and agreed to lease dark fibre, exchange space and ducts to NBN Co. as part of the agreement, Telstra would not be able to market their mobile network as an alternative to the NBN for a number of years.

The agreement with Telstra required that the copper telephone network be decommissioned in an area 18 months after optic fibre is ready for service and that new connections were to be made to the optic fibre network and not the copper network. In some cases, premises have been left without service due to lengthy delays in establishing NBN connections. Telstra advises the use of the mobile network for phone and internet in these cases.

=== Agreement with Optus (23 June 2011) ===
NBN Co signed an agreement with Optus over its hybrid fibre-coaxial network estimated to be worth A$800 million post-tax net present value. The ACCC—whose approval is required before both agreements take effect—raised concerns about the clauses being anti-competitive.

=== First release sites (2011) ===
The first (in red) and second (in green) release sites of the NBN rollout.

Five areas comprising around 14,000 premises were chosen as the 'first mainland sites', each representing rollout challenges the NBN was expecting to face during an Australia-wide rollout, with the first services going live on 19 April 2011. commenced on 17 August 2010,

- Armidale was the first site to officially launch on 18 May 2011 with 2,900 premises included of which 90% did not opt out for connection.
- Kiama Downs and Minnamurra was the second site to officially launch, following Armidale on 29 July 2011. Approximately 2,350 premises were passed, of which 80 per cent did not opt out for installation.
- Brunswick had the lowest installation rate at the time of its official 4 August 2011 launch: of the approximately 2,689 premises passed, only 50% opted for installation.
- Aitkenvale and Mundingburra followed Brunswick on 1 September 2011 with approximately 3,100 premises passed and 63 per cent did not opt out for installation.
- Willunga was the fifth and final 'first release site' to officially launch on 16 September 2011 with approximately 940 premises passed and 91 per cent did not opt out for installation.

These figures are for passive installation of a dark fibre to the premises. To activate it residents need to purchase a service from an RSP.

Furthermore, following the low take up rates in Tasmania, the government has adopted an opt-out model in which users are assumed to want the service unless they explicitly opt-out.

Thus passive installation figures may be quite different from the proportion of residences that actually use the NBN service.

=== Second release sites ===
Fourteen second release sites comprising 54,000 premises in all states and territories were announced on 8 July 2010 with construction commencing in August 2011.

The sites comprise premises in Aspley, Bacchus Marsh, Casuarina, Coffs Harbour, Geraldton, Gungahlin, Mandurah, Modbury, Prospect, Riverstone, South Morang, Springfield Lakes, Toowoomba and Victoria Park.

Telstra had agreed to allow NBN Co to use its exchanges and ducts in the second release sites before the agreement was finalised.

== 2012 ==
The opposition Liberal/National Coalition's Malcolm Turnbull addressed significant attacks on the NBN, these focused on the estimated cost and timeline for implementation and the build cost, with specific attacks on the expense of the Long Term Satellite Service.

'Don't buy yourself a Camry, a Falcon - buy yourself a Rolls-Royce, a Bentley,' opposition communications spokesman Malcolm Turnbull told reporters in Canberra today.

'Nothing but the best will do, nothing but the most expensive will do.'

Mr Turnbull said the industry had told him there was enough capacity on existing and scheduled-to-be-launched satellites to provide broadband services to rural and remote Australia. As well, the existing interim satellite service could be upgraded to a permanent one.

'Why does the government have to pay over $1 billion in total in building, launching, flying these satellites of their own?' Mr Turnbull said.

Later they commented that in government they would take an 'agnostic' approach.

== 2013 ==
The MTM was selected as the approach to broadband provision by the Liberal–National coalition in the lead up to the 2013 Australian federal election.

=== 2013 Federal election (7 September 2013) ===
After the 2013 election, the Abbott government, with Malcolm Turnbull as Minister for Communications, the new communications minister Malcolm Turnbull announced immediate changes to the government's NBN plans: much of the NBN Board was asked to resign; Ziggy Switkowski was appointed new chairman. Turnbull announced that the FTTP rollout would continue in the short term, with the probability that rollout will be downgraded to 'alternative technologies' such as Fibre to the node after a 60-day review was completed.

A number of studies and a strategic review into the NBN were commissioned. The strategic review was to determine the ideal infrastructure mix to deliver fast broadband across the country as quickly as possible and reduce establishment costs.

On 12 December 2013, the NBN Board appointed Bill Morrow as NBNCo's new CEO, replacing Mike Quigley. Quigley had announced his intention to resign from NBNCo in July 2013. Morrow resigned from his role as CEO of Vodafone Australia to accept the appointment with NBNCo.

Telstra responded to the prospect of changes by asserting its intention to retain the $11bn value it generates from the previous government's deal.

The NBN faced delays due to a lack of skilled fibre splicers in Australia and some work had to be re-done due to the inadequate training given to many of the workers.

Delays and health concerns occurred in 2013 when work was stopped for several weeks at a number of sites after asbestos was found in Telstra pits.

After the 2013 election, the former communications minister Stephen Conroy conceded that the initial rollout plans were 'too ambitious' and that there were delays in implementation.

=== Multi-Technology Mix (MTM) ===
Malcolm Turnbull announced in 2013 that the NBN would be delivered using a mix of old and new technology, a Multi-Technology Mix, stating that it would allow significant savings on the earlier Fibre to the Premises and earlier completion to the approach chosen by the Gillard and Rudd governments. The MTM has been the focus of criticism regarding cost overruns and the delay in delivering the NBN.

The MTM includes:

- Fibre to the Curb (FTTC) - previously Fibre to the distribution point (FTTdp), used for smaller areas not worthy of a FTTN node.
- Fibre to the node (FTTN) - The technology used to rapidly provide NBN to a large area, roughly the same as a Telstra "DA" (Distribution area .. the area serviced by a big bundle eg broken out at a pillar ). Problematic streets (say, the buried bundle to it had degraded.) in an FTTN area would be fixed by FTTC .
- Hybrid fibre-coaxial (HFC) - Telstra HFC network is being maintained, originally parts of the Optus network were going to be maintained but it was found to be too problematic given it added small areas that were widely separated.

=== Progress 2013 ===
At 3 November 2013, construction of the network had passed 354,793 premises and there were 109,862 active customer services. In areas where the FTTP network is being rolled out, a similar agreement with Optus is in place.

== 2014 ==
In April 2014, The Australian newspaper judged the NBN rollout in Tasmania, its first location, as 'shambolic' and 'abysmal'.

The MTM approach finalised with the Abbott government promising significant savings on the earlier Fibre To The Premises and earlier completion to the approach chosen by the Gillard and Rudd governments.

Initial costs and timing for the Coalition NBN were A$29.5 billion of public funding to construct by 2019.

In December a new agreement was finalised with Telstra and Optus for purchase of copper and HFC networks, for a similar cost to the existing compensation for shutting down those networks. Telstra accepted $11B for its part of the network, less a discount for a "remediation credit" where parts of the network required maintenance.

=== Black spot policy (February 2014) ===
In February 2014 the government produced the MyBroadband website to provide information about access to the internet. It showed that there were 1.6 million premises across Australia with either no access to fixed broadband or very poor broadband connectivity.

The Minister Malcolm Turnbull stated that the black spots would be a higher priority, without however directing NBN Co address them. There is concern that the NBN will continue to focus on areas that already have relatively fast copper broadband, and thus avoid addressing people that have no or very limited broadband for the foreseeable future. In May 2014 the NBN announced that it would be targeting premises that were already serviced with fibre by rival TPG.

== 2015 ==
In 2015, Quigley criticised cost blowouts in the NBN, saying they were the fault of changes made to the rollout plan introduced by the Coalition government.

Sky Muster I (NBN-Co 1A) was launched on 1 October 2015 from the Guiana Space Centre in French Guiana, South America, alongside Argentina's ARSAT-2, on an Ariane 5ECA rocket.

=== Progress 2015 ===
At 30 June 2015, the company announced 1,011,973 premises are now able to order NBN services. Of that, 571,527 brownfields and 180,796 greenfields premises are able to order fixed-line services, Communications Minister Malcolm Turnbull said. An additional 220,917 premises are able to order services in fixed wireless, and 38,743 premises have connected to the interim satellite service. There were 485,615 active users.

== 2016 ==
With Malcolm Turnbull becoming Prime Minister of Australia, Mitch Fifield became the Minister for the communications portfolio, and thus the NBN.

Substantial cost over-runs and delays in the delivery of the MTM have subsequently been reported.

Sky Muster I (NBN-Co 1A) became operational in April 2016.

Sky Muster II (NBN-Co 1B) was launched on 5 October 2016.

=== Progress 2016 ===
At 30 June 2016, the company had passed 2,893,474 premises across all technologies. Company annual revenue was $421 million compared to $164 million in 2015 financial year, with approximately 1,100,000 active user at 30 June.

== 2017 ==
A September 2017 report by the Joint Standing Committee on the National Broadband Network found significant issues with the technology used by the NBN and the performance of NBN Co, all but one of the Coalition members of the committee released a dissenting report strongly defending the NBN and NBN Co.

In response to the imminent broadcast of a documentary critical of the performance of the NBN on Four Corners, Malcolm Turnbull stated that the NBN was a failure, blaming the earlier Rudd and Gillard governments. The Four Corners documentary noted significant issues with the roll out and complaints regarding performance of the NBN. Following the Prime Minister's acknowledgment of the NBN's failure, Kevin Rudd noted that, on assuming government in 2013, Malcolm Turnbull, as Minister for Communications in the Abbott government radically changed the technical aspects of the NBN.

== 2019 ==
NBN Co's chief executive Stephen Rue announced in August 2019 that the $51 billion project would be completed within budget by June 2020.

=== Progress ===
At the time of the announcement, the network was 85% complete.

== 2020 ==
In February 2020, Rue announced that the network was 90% complete. He also reaffirmed his August 2019 announcement that the project would be completed within budget by June 2020.

== National rollout ==
NBN Co planned to complete the FTTP rollout by June 2021, along with the completion of the fixed wireless and satellite rollout by 2015.

NBN Co initially planned to complete the MTM rollout by 2020.
