= List of chancellors, vice-chancellors and presidents of RMIT University =

This is a list of chancellors, vice-chancellors and presidents of RMIT University (RMIT).

From its foundation in 1887 until 1991, RMIT was a private institute. During this time its chief academic officer was known as its Principal and its chief executive officer was known as its President—who also chaired its Council of Directors. The roles of Principal and President were merged into the single position of Vice-Chancellor and President when RMIT was made a public university in 1992 (by an act of the Parliament of Victoria).

Its Council of Directors was replaced by a Chancellery of Deputy and Pro- Vice-Chancellors and vice-presidents which is headed by the Vice-Chancellor and President. A board of governors known as the Council of RMIT was also created in 1992 which is chaired by the Chancellor of RMIT (a role also created in 1992) as its Governor-in-Council. The Council consists of the Chancellery, the Chair of the Academic Board and elected members drawn from as and beyond the university community.

The council is responsible for the "general direction and superintendence of the University". Power over all the academic and administrative affairs of RMIT is then passed to the Vice-Chancellor and President by the Council in accordance with the current Royal Melbourne Institute of Technology Act of 2010. The Vice-Chancellor is therefore responsible for the "conduct of the University's affairs in all matters".

The Vietnamese branch of RMIT also has its own Pro Vice-Chancellor and General Director, which is a role equal to that of the President of RMIT Australia but subordinate to the role of Vice-Chancellor of RMIT.

The current Chancellor of RMIT is Peggy O'Neal, AO. The current Vice-Chancellor of RMIT and the President of RMIT Australia is Professor Alec Cameron. The current Pro Vice-Chancellor and General Director of RMIT Vietnam is Professor Claire Macken.

== RMIT Australia ==
=== Chancellor ===
==== Council President (1887–1991) ====
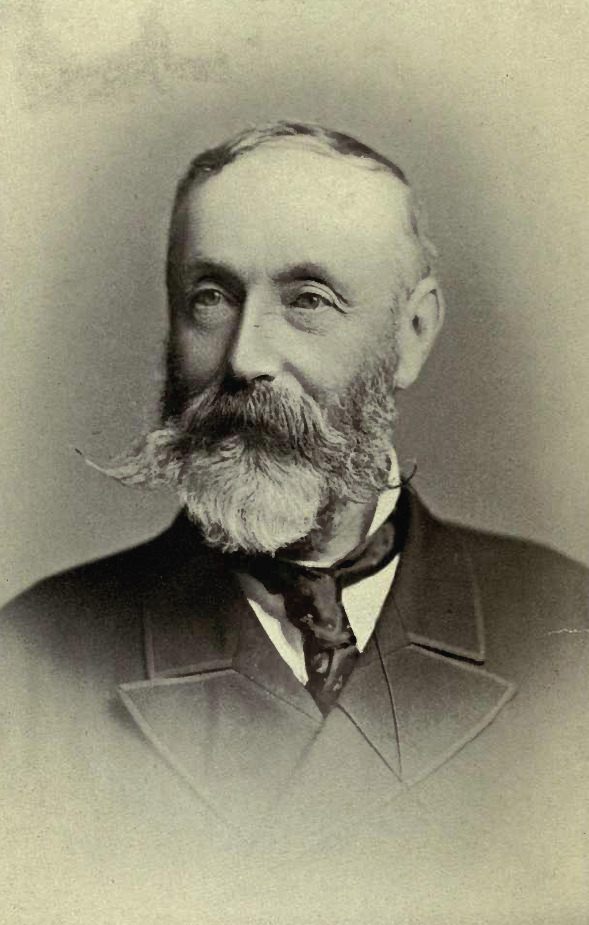
Francis Ormond, founder and philanthropist (President, 1887–1889)

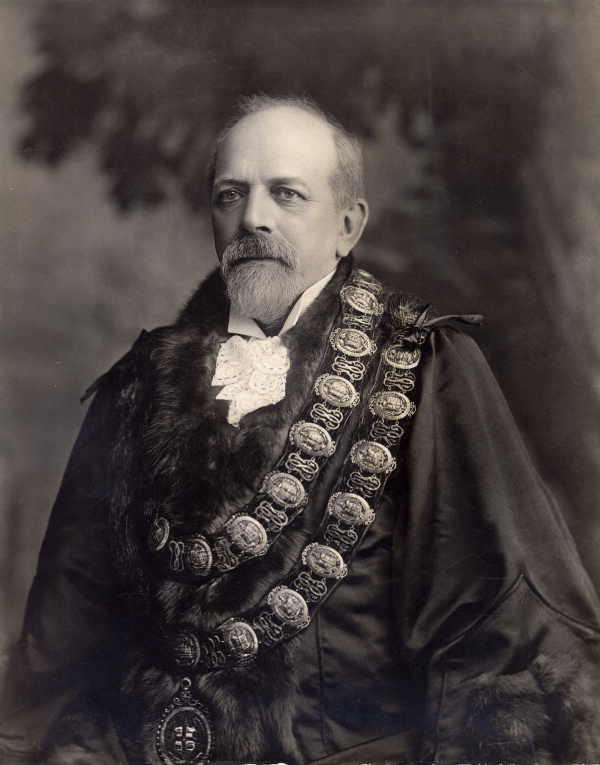
Samuel Gillott, Lord Mayor of Melbourne (President, 1911)

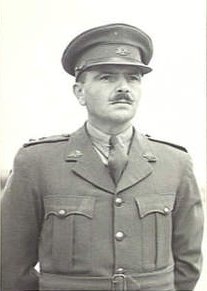
Sir Bernard Evans, architect and Australian Army officer (President, 1959–1960)

- 1887–1889 Francis Ormond, MLC (founder)
- 1889–1899 William Kernot (brother of 1920 President Wilfred Kernot)
- 1900 Joseph Nixon
- 1901Frederick Bromley, MLA
- 1902 C. S. Paterson
- 1903 Calder Edkins Oliver
- 1904 James Robb
- 1905 Thomas Smith
- 1906 William Embling, MLC
- 1907 James Smith
- 1908 Robert Solly, MLA
- 1909 Stephen Barker, JP
- 1910 John Lemmon, MLA
- 1911 Sir Samuel Gillott, MLA
- 1912 Thomas Bride
- 1913 Walter Hirst Haigh
- 1914 William Shearing Busby
- 1915 A. G. Proudfoot
- 1916 H. Burgess
- 1917 R. Fiddes-Brown
- 1918 Charles Gray, JP
- 1919 Arthur Hogg Merrin
- 1920 Wilfred Kernot, MIME (brother of 1889–1899 President William Kernot)
- 1921 David Avery
- 1922 Sir David Hennessy, KB
- 1923 Daniel White
- 1924 James Alexander Smith
- 1925 E. F. Russell
- 1926 Victor L. Ginn
- 1927 G. A. Curtis
- 1928 J. H. Bradshaw
- 1929 Capt. Charles Harold Peters, MC
- 1930 F. W. Trotter
- 1931 Stanley Rodda (also served as Principal between 1913 and 1927)
- 1932 A. E. Kane
- 1933 Harry Goldman
- 1934 J. Ash
- 1935 James Stanley Rogers
- 1936 Harry R. Balfour
- 1937 Percy Clarey, MLC
- 1938 Donald Cameron
- 1939 G. R. Holland
- 1940 Albert Monk
- 1941 Charlie Crofts
- 1942 E. Fred Ryall, JP
- 1943 Andrew Campbell Ahlston
- 1944–1945 Henry A.L. Allibon
- 1946 Lt-Col. James G. Gillespie
- 1947 Capt. W.B. Nelson
- 1948 E. L. Morton
- 1949 P. L. Henderson
- 1950 C. W. N. Sexton
- 1951 F. Peter Johns
- 1952 Eric Oswald Hercus
- 1953 James Ross
- 1954–1955 Niel Bannatyne Lewis
- 1956–1958 Leighton F. Irwin, CMG
- 1959–1960 Brig. Sir Bernard Evans, DSO, ED
- 1961 Sir Lewis Burne, CBE
- 1962 F. G. B. May
- 1963–1964 W. G. Smallman, JP
- 1965–1966 L. H. "Tod" Waite
- 1967–1968 John William Wood
- 1969 L. E. Anderson
- 1970 George Brown
- 1971–1972 Clyde James Griffiths, OBE
- 1973–1974 R. H. Scott
- 1975–1976 Ian Permezel
- 1977–1978 Evan Walker, MLC, AO
- 1979–1980 John Dempster Lawson
- 1981–1982 Austin Asche, AC, QC
- 1983–1984 R. G. Wallace
- 1985–1987 D. Race

==== Chancellor of RMIT (1992–present) ====
- 1992–1994 Ivan Deveson, AO
- 1995–1998 Sam Smorgon, AO
- 1999–2003 Donald Mercer
- 2003–2010 R. Dennis Gibson, AO
- 2011–2021 Ziggy Switkowski, AO
- 2022–present Peggy O'Neal, AO

=== Vice-Chancellor and President ===
==== Principals (1887–1991) ====
- 1887–1913 Frederick Campbell
- 1913–1927 Stanley Rodda (also served as president in 1931)
- 1927–1952 Frank Ellis, MBE
- 1952–1963 Ronald Mackay
- 1967–1976 Percival Jackson, CMG, CBE
- 1977–1978 Peter Whitton
- 1979–1988 Brian Smith, AO
- 1989–1991 David Beanland, AO

==== Vice-Chancellor and President of RMIT (1992–present) ====
- 1992–2000 David Beanland, AO
- 2000–2004 Ruth Dunkin
- 2005–2014 Margaret Gardner, AO
- 2015–2021 Martin G. Bean, CBE
- 2022–present Alec Cameron

== RMIT Vietnam ==
=== President (2002–2019) ===
- 2002–2008 Michael Mann
- 2009–2011 Merilyn Liddell, AM
- 2012–2014 Joyce Kirk
- 2014–2019 Gael McDonald

=== Chairman (2019–2022) ===
- 2019–2022 Peter Coloe

=== Pro Vice-Chancellor and General Director (2022–present) ===
- 2022–present Claire Macken

== See also ==
- RMIT University
- RMIT University Vietnam
- List of alumni and faculty of the Royal Melbourne Institute of Technology
