= Sharon Pickering =

Sharon Pickering may refer to:

- Sharon Pickering (swimmer)
- Sharon Pickering (academic)
