= Royal Melbourne Institute of Technology Vietnam =

Private university in Vietnam

RMIT University Vietnam
- Trường Đại học RMIT Việt Nam
- Motto: Perita manus mens exculta
- Motto in English: Skilled hand and cultivated mind
- Type: Private
- Established: 2000
- Affiliations: ASAIHL, ATN, OUA
- Chancellor: Peggy O'Neal AO
- Vice-Chancellor: Alec Cameron
- Faculty: 1,600 (FTE)
- Students: 16,000
- Location: Ho Chi Minh City, Hanoi and Danang, Vietnam; 10°43′47″N 106°41′38″E
- Campus: Urban
- Colours: red, navy blue
- Website: rmit.edu.vn

The Royal Melbourne Institute of Technology Vietnam (abbreviated as RMIT University Vietnam; Vietnamese: Đại học RMIT Việt Nam or Học viện Công nghệ Hoàng Gia Melbourne Việt Nam) is the Vietnamese branch of the Australian university Royal Melbourne Institute of Technology. It has three campuses located in Ho Chi Minh City, Hanoi, and Danang.

RMIT was the first completely foreign-owned university granted permission to operate in Vietnam. Since its establishment in 2000, it has won 19 Golden Dragon Awards from the Vietnamese Government for excellence in education.

== History ==
In 1998, the Royal Melbourne Institute of Technology in Australia was invited by the Vietnamese government to establish a fully foreign-owned university in Vietnam. In 2000, it was granted a licence by the Vietnamese Ministry of Planning and Investment to deliver undergraduate and postgraduate education, training and research.

In 2001, it purchased and restored a 19th-century French Colonial building and grounds in District 3, Ho Chi Minh City. The building located at 21 Phạm Ngọc Thạch Street, near the Turtle Lake, is informally referred to as "the Castle" by students. The site remains a radial site of the present Ho Chi Minh City campus. In 2004, it established a second campus in Hanoi.

The present Ho Chi Minh City campus is located in the Zone B of the South Saigon development in District 7. The first academic buildings on the large purpose-built campus opened in 2005. In 2011, its recreation complex and residential centres opened.

In 2018 it opened its Foreign Language Training Centre in Danang. The centre provides English language programs.

RMIT has been awarded 19 Golden Dragon Awards for its "excellence in education" by the Vietnamese Ministry of Trade since 2003. It has also been awarded by the Australian Chamber of Commerce for its "innovation and community service" as well as received Certificates of Merit from the Ho Chi Minh City People's Committee and the Hanoi Government. In 2008, RMIT International University received a Certificate of Merit from the prime minister of Vietnam, Nguyen Tan Dung, for its "educational achievements contributing to the social and economic development of Vietnam". In 2011, RMIT University Vietnam received Certificate of Merit from Vietnam Minister of Education and Training.

== Organisation ==
The Royal Melbourne Institute of Technology is a public university created by the Royal Melbourne Institute of Technology Act 1992 of the parliament of the Australian state of Victoria, and it continues in accordance with the Royal Melbourne Institute of Technology Act 2010. RMIT is governed by a Council, led by its Chancellor (as Governor-in-Council), which is responsible for the "general direction and superintendence of the University".

The university (the colleges, schools, institutes and centres of RMIT) trades under the name "RMIT University" in Australia, and its subsidiaries are managed under the name "RMIT Group". The Council grants powers of administration over RMIT University and the RMIT Group to its Vice-Chancellor and President (as chief executive officer), who is responsible for the "conduct of the University's affairs in all matters".

RMIT Vietnam Holdings Pty Ltd is the Australian subsidiary in the RMIT Group that owns the Vietnamese company RMIT University Vietnam LLC. RMIT University in Australia confers the qualifications of RMIT University Vietnam, which are subject to the requirements set out by the Australian Government Department of Education and Training (and Tertiary Education Quality and Standards Agency) and the Vietnamese Government Ministry of Education and Training.

RMIT University Vietnam is managed by a Board led by the Pro Vice-Chancellor and General Director of RMIT University Vietnam (as chair of the board).

== Campuses ==
=== Ho Chi Minh City ===
==== Saigon South ====
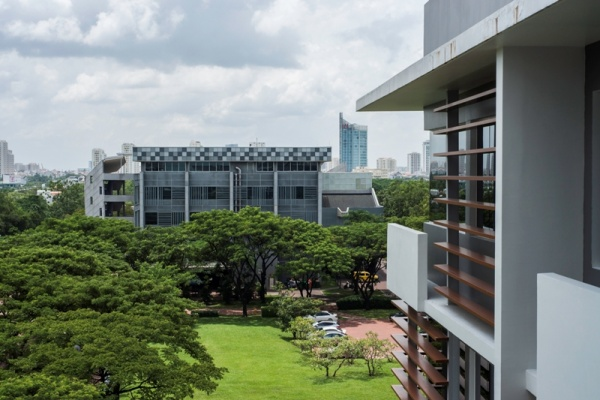
RMIT Saigon South campus looks forward Nguyễn Văn Linh Parkway

RMIT's Saigon South campus is located at 702 Nguyễn Văn Linh Parkway, Tân Phong, District 7, Ho Chi Minh City (now is Tân Hưng), approximately 7 km from the city centre to the south. The purpose-built facility was opened in 2001 and was designed by architectural firm Norman Day and Associates. Professor Norman Day is an adjunct professor of architecture at RMIT University and also an alumnus of the university.

The East Wing of the campus houses its main academic centre and sporting fields, and the West Wing houses the university's administration offices, food and beverage outlets, a health clinic, the Melbourne Theatre, and the campus library.

In 2012, RMIT Vietnam opened its latest Academic Building - AB2. Stage 2, completed in 2009, included a sport and leisure centre, tennis courts, and residential buildings.

=== Hanoi ===
RMIT's Hanoi campus opened in 2004 in a renovated multi-level building situated in the Van Phuc Compound in the diplomatic quarter of Hanoi. From March 2011, RMIT Hanoi has moved from the previous nine level building near the famous Temple of Literature, Hanoi (Văn Miếu Hà Nội) to the Tower B of Handi Resco Building at 521 Kim Mã Street, Ngọc Khánh, Ba Đình District (now is Giảng Võ), Hanoi.

== Programs ==
The current offered programs include:

=== Undergraduate ===
- Bachelor of Business (Economics and Finance)
- Bachelor of Business (International Business)
- Bachelor of Business (Management)
- Bachelor of Business (Logistics & Supply Chain Management)
- Bachelor of Business (Digital Business)
- Bachelor of Business (Human Resource Management)
- Bachelor of Digital Marketing
- Bachelor of Accounting
- Bachelor of Tourism & Hospitality Management
- Bachelor of Communication (Professional Communication)
- Bachelor of Design (Digital Media)
- Bachelor of Design (Games)
- Bachelor of Digital Film and Video
- Bachelor of Design Studies
- Bachelor of Engineering (Electrical and Electronics) (Honours)
- Bachelor of Engineering (Robotics and Mechatronics) (Honours)
- Bachelor of Engineering (Software Engineering) (Honours)
- Bachelor of Information Technology
- Bachelor of Applied Science (Psychology)
- Bachelor of Fashion (Enterprise)
- Bachelor of Languages
- Bachelor of Applied Science (Aviation)

=== Postgraduate ===
- Master of Business Administration (MBA)
- Master of International Business (MIB)
- Master of Artificial Intelligence
- Graduate Certificate in Business Administration
- Graduate Certificate in International Business

== Leaders ==
RMIT University Vietnam is governed by a Board of Management, the Chair being Professor Claire Macken, Pro Vice-Chancellor and General Director, RMIT Vietnam.

== Student life ==
RMIT University Vietnam's campuses currently have a combined student population of approximately 16000 students, with international students from Australia, China, France, Germany, Malaysia, Russia, Singapore, South Africa, South Korea, the United Kingdom and the United States, as well as other countries. The percentage of international students is approximately 9%.

Across the (Hanoi and Ho Chi Minh City) campuses students have access to over 60 student clubs such as English, photography, dance, entrepreneurship, business, accountancy, Aikido, San Shou, SIFE, the environment and more.

Events and parties are held by student clubs and the Student Council (SC) throughout the year.

RMIT University Vietnam art collection is a collection of contemporary Vietnamese art. The Vietnamese artists in the collection range from established and mid-career artists as well as young emerging artists. RMIT Library Vietnam.

RMIT's students have access to the Global Exchange Program which is a short-term study commitment of one or two semesters at a partner university overseas. RMIT students have access to study experiences in over 45 countries.

== See also ==
- RMIT University
