= Australian Universities Quality Agency =

Agency overview
- Formed: 2000; 26 years ago
- Dissolved: 2011; 15 years ago
- Jurisdiction: Australia

The Australian Universities Quality Agency (AUQA) was established in 2000, and was the government body responsible for providing audit of higher education institutions in Australia.

== History ==
AUQA was jointly established in 2000 as an independent quality agency by Federal, State & Territory Governments through the Ministerial Council for Education, Employment and Youth Affairs (MCEETYA). AUQA was in some respects a successor to the Committee for Quality Assurance in Higher Education (CQAHE)(1992-1995) and the Commonwealth Tertiary Education Commission (CTEC) that came before it (1977-1988).

== Dissolution ==
AUQA was dissolved in 2011 and its functions were transferred to the Tertiary Education Quality and Standards Agency (TEQSA). TEQSA's implementation reflects a move away from the 'fitness-for-purpose' approach employed by AUQA to one premised on regulation and risk.
