= Killarney, West Virginia =

- Unincorporated community
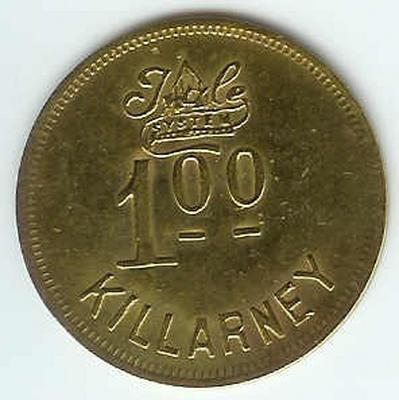
- coal scrip from Killarney, West Virginia

- Location within West Virginia Location within the United States
- Coordinates: 37°37′41″N 81°16′37″W
- Country: United States
- State: West Virginia
- County: Raleigh
- Elevation: 1,693 ft (516 m)
- Time zone: UTC-5 (Eastern (EST))
  - Summer (DST): UTC-4 (EDT)
- Area codes: 304 & 681
- GNIS feature ID: 1541192

Killarney was an unincorporated community in Raleigh County, West Virginia, United States. Killarney is 5.5 miles (8.9 km) south-southwest of Sophia.

== Notable people ==
- Peggy O'Neal, President of the Richmond Football Club (2013–present) and Chancellor of RMIT University (2021–present)
