= Ziggy Switkowski =

Polish-Australian business executive and nuclear physicist

Ziggy Switkowski AO FAA FTSE FAICD

Chancellor of the Royal Melbourne Institute of Technology
- In office February 2011 – October 2021
- Vice Chancellor: Margaret Gardner; Martin Bean
- Preceded by: Dennis Gibson
- Succeeded by: Peggy O'Neal

Personal details
- Born: 1948 (age 77–78) Rheine, West Germany
- Education: University of Melbourne
- Profession: business executive nuclear physicist

Zygmunt Edward "Ziggy" Switkowski (born 1948) is a Polish Australian business executive and nuclear physicist. His most public role was as the chief executive officer of Australia's largest telecommunications company Telstra from 1999 to 2005. During his tenure, he oversaw the privatisation of the then government-owned corporation through a series of public tranche sales (known as the T1, T2 and T3 sales). Later positions were chairman of both NBN Co and Suncorp, a director of Healthscope, Oil Search and Tabcorp and the Chancellor of the Royal Melbourne Institute of Technology (RMIT University).

== Career ==
=== Kodak ===
Switkowski joined Kodak as a research scientist in 1978. He moved to New York, becoming Kodak's director of business planning in 1985. In 1988, he returned to Australia, becoming deputy managing director of Kodak's Australian subsidiary, and in 1992, became its CEO.

He would later say about his time as CEO of Kodak Australasia, "that's when I morphed from being a technologist to being a business executive … and I do think they were my character-forming years."

=== Optus and Telstra ===
In 1996, Switkowski became CEO of Australia's second largest telecommunications company Optus.

On 1 March 1999, Switkowski was appointed chief executive officer of Australia's public and largest telecommunications company, Telstra, and to the board of directors of Telstra's pay television partner Foxtel. Before his appointment, he was group managing director of Telstra's Business and International Development division.

Switkowski oversaw the implementation of the second tranche sale of Telstra (the 'T2' sale) on the Australian Securities Exchange, New Zealand Stock Exchange and New York Stock Exchange that began in September 1999.

Switkowski resigned from Telstra on 3 December 2004, and was replaced by Solomon Trujillo.

=== NBN ===
On 3 October 2013, Switkowski was confirmed as the new chairman and interim CEO of NBN Co by Communications Minister Malcolm Turnbull, and reverted to the role of Non-Executive Chairman from 2 April 2014 following the appointment of Bill Morrow as chief executive officer. This followed a decision to deliver the NBN with 'alternative technologies' such as Fibre to the node and the use of a Multi-Technology Mix (MTM).

=== Nuclear research ===
On 6 June 2006, Switkowski was appointed to chair a Commonwealth Government inquiry into the viability of a domestic nuclear power industry.

The inquiry concluded that Australia is well positioned to increase its production and export of uranium as well as adding nuclear power to its own energy mix. However, an independent panel of Australian scientists and nuclear experts have been critical of these findings, claiming that they relied upon flawed assumptions while dodging important questions such as the disposal of radioactive waste and the potential greenhouse gas implications of increased mining.

=== Other directorships ===
Switkowski served as a non-executive director of the multinational packaging company Amcor from 1995 to 1999.

On 19 September 2005, Switkowski took a non-executive director role with Suncorp-Metway – his first position after resigning from Telstra. Since then he has become the chairman as of the 2011 Annual General Meeting.

In 2006, Switkowski was appointed president of the board of directors of the Australian Centre for the Moving Image on 1 January – for a three-year term. He also took non-executive director roles with Healthscope on 19 January, and with Tabcorp Holdings on 2 October.

Switkowski was elected chairman of Opera Australia and on the board of directors of the Business Council of Australia.

Switkowski was later appointed to the Board of Oilsearch.

In August 2021, Switkowski was appointed as Chairman of Crown Resorts, Australia's largest gambling, gaming and entertainment company.

==== RMIT ====
On 27 October 2010, it was announced that Switkowski would become the Chancellor of the Royal Melbourne Institute of Technology (RMIT University). He was officially appointed to the position on 1 January 2011. On 7 September 2021, Switkowsi announced that he would step down from the position of Chancellor of RMIT by the end of October 2021, two weeks after he was appointed as Chairman of Crown Resorts. Peggy O'Neal succeeded Switkowski as Chancellor in January 2022.

== Honours ==
In the 2014 Queen's Birthday Honours List, Switkowski was appointed as an Officer of the Order of Australia (AO), for "distinguished service to the community, particularly to tertiary education administration, scientific organisations and the telecommunications sector, to business, and to the arts".

Switkowski is a Fellow of the Australian Institute of Company Directors (FAICD) and also of the Australian Academy of Technological Sciences and Engineering (FTSE). In 2015 he was elected Fellow of the Australian Academy of Science (FAA).

== Personal life ==
Switkowski is married and lives with his wife near Cape Schanck, on Melbourne's Mornington Peninsula.

Academic offices
Preceded by Dennis Gibson	Chancellor of RMIT University; 2011–2021	Succeeded by Peggy O'Neal
