= Xohm =

XOHM was the brand name Sprint Nextel Corporation was using to promote its WiMAX services, currently labelled by Sprint Corporation simply as 4G. Sprint was the first service provider in the United States, with its partner Clearwire, to announce the building of a mobile WiMAX network. The XOHM WiMAX mobile Internet initiative earned the Best of WiMAX World 2007 Award for Industry Innovation.

Chicago, Baltimore, and Washington, D.C. served as initial test markets, with Boston, Philadelphia, and Dallas to follow before nationwide rollout; however Sprint announced delays of the soft launch at the 2008 CTIA. XOHM launched officially on September 29, 2008, in Baltimore and was deployed in other markets in 2009, 2010 and 2011 as Sprint 4G.

XOHM was merged with Clearwire. Sprint owns 54% of the firm, with ex-Clearwire shareholders owning 24%, and a consortium of Comcast, Time Warner, Intel, Google, and Bright House owning 22%. The new firm was named Clear.

On December 1, 2008, Clearwire announced that XOHM will be phased out in 2009. XOHM will be replaced by the joint-Sprint/Clearwire brand, Clear.

A $500 million project funded by taxpayers in New York City involved the lease of a 2.5GHz WiMax band for a "broadband wireless public safety network."

On April 13, 2015, Sprint announced to its customers via email that they will cease operating the CLEAR 4G (WiMAX) Network and Clearwire Expedience Network on November 6, 2015, at 12:01 am EST.
