= Norman Day =

Australian architect

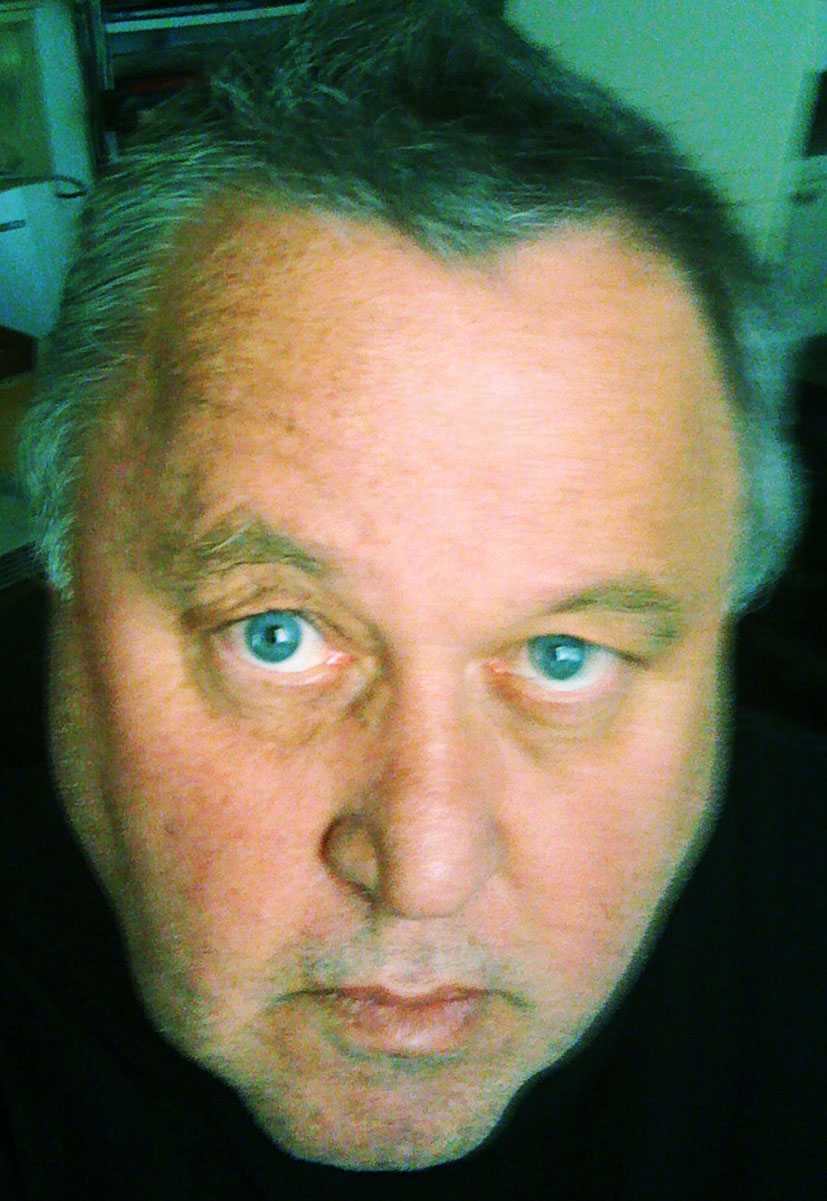
Norman Day

Dr Norman Kingwell Day (born 25 March 1947, in Melbourne, Australia) is an architect, educator, and writer.

== Architecture career ==
After graduating in the late 1960s, Day worked in the office of Romberg & Boyd, with noted architect and critic Robin Boyd and Professor Frederick Romberg. He then started his own practice in 1971.

His practice was initially based in Melbourne, where he came to prominence in the 1980s as part of the new wave of architects who adopted Postmodernism. Later his practice expended to South East Asia, with offices in Melbourne, Ho Chi Minh City, Bangkok and Dili.

His major commissions include Mowbray College (Melton), Australian and New Zealand College of Anaesthetists Headquarters (Melbourne), RMIT International University, Vietnam (Ho Chi Minh City) and Can Tho University Learning Resource Center (Can Tho City, Vietnam) and the Embassy for East Timor (Canberra).

Since 2000, he has been involved with the new nation of East Timor, consulting on the reconstruction of the country with projects including the Xanana Gusmão Reading Room/ Library (Dili), Hotel dom Aleixo (Dili)and schemes for empowerment training. He is a board member of "Architects Without Frontiers". Design submissions have been made for a design proposal for the new Assembly and Ba Dinh Hall (Hanoi), an urban design competition for Thu Thiem district (HCMC), Australian Centre for Contemporary Art (Melbourne), MOMA at Heide (Melbourne), West Kowloon Redevelopment (Hong Kong) and National Trade Union Headquarters (Singapore).

== Teaching career ==
Day is an adjunct professor of architecture at the RMIT University, which also awarded him an honorary Doctorate of Architecture. During the period 1976 to 2002, he was lecturer and design coordinator Theory, History, Communications Department of Architecture, Faculty of Design and Environmental Construction, RMIT University (Melbourne).

He has lectured also at the University of Western Australia Perth, School of Art and Design, RMIT at Bundoora, University of New South Wales (Sydney), School of Architecture, University of Melbourne. Department of Architecture (with Professor Susana Torre), Columbia University, New York, Lecturer Council of Adult Education, Monash University (Melbourne), Swinburne Technical College (Melbourne), and Deakin University (Geelong).

Day's titles are: Doctor of Architecture (Honoris Causa, RMIT), adjunct professor of architecture (RMIT), M Arch (RMIT), B Arch (Melb), ARB (Vic),

== Exhibitions ==
- XXX Exhibition, 30 Years of Architecture – Norman Day, RMIT Gallery, Melbourne, 2001
- Models Inc. Architects + Industry (Curator: Val Austin) A + I Gallery, Melbourne, 1996
- World—Wide—Work: Architecture by Fax CURVE, Tolarno Gallery, Melbourne, 1995
- "Fin de Siecle?: Sydney and twentyfirst century: Architectures of Melbourne", Clapin Burdett Gallery, Sydney, 1993
- "Fin de Siecle? Melbourne — and the twenty-first century" RMIT, Melbourne, 1992
- Australian Mythos Sydney — Reflection on an Unfinished Journey, 1988
- Neo-Classicism ? Monash University + Power Institute (Sydney and Melbourne).1986
- TwoxTwo '86: Artists + Architects: George Paton Gallery (Melbourne).1986 (Exhibition partner Julie Brown-Rrap )
- Architecture as Idea, RMIT Gallery, Melbourne, 1984
- Next Wave, Canberra, 1981
- Four Melbourne Architects , Powell Street Gallery, Melbourne, with Edmond and Corrigan, Gregory Burgess , Peter Crone, 1979

== Awards and honours ==
Professional awards include:

- RAIA-Bates Smart Award for Architecture in the Media.
- Maggie Edmond Enduring Architecture Award, 2010
- Finalist Award Robin Boyd Award House of the Year.
- RAIA (National): Outstanding Architecture.
- Seven Royal Australian Institute of Architects Awards.
- Lustig + Moar - RAIA Architecture Prize.
- BELLE magazine ]House of the Year; 1990.
- Housing Industry of Australia, House of the Year Award (Best Use of Steel).
- Australian Business Award 2005 for 'Business Innovation', Australian Chamber of Commerce (AUSCHAM) – Fosters Vietnam Ltd.
- Excellence in Construction - National Building and Construction Awards, Commercial Building, National Award Master Builders Association of Australia.
- Excellence in Construction - Commercial Building Victorian State Award Master Builders Association of Victoria.
- Australian Government Award for valued contribution as a volunteer working in East Timor (Timor Leste).
- City of Port Phillip Design ad Development Awards (Australian and New Zealand College of Anaesthetists) – best contribution to achieving sustainable development.

== Writing ==
He was first employed as architecture critic for The Age (Melbourne) in 1976, and has supplied critique for the Australian Broadcasting Commission (Radio and TV), and previously for the Sydney Morning Herald and The Sunday Age (Melbourne).

Articles have been published world-wide including National Times (Melbourne), (Editor) Architecture Australia magazine (National), (Editor) Architect Magazine, DOMUS (Italy), Studio International (London), International Architecture (London), Aujourd Hui (Paris), Monument Magazine (Sydney), Transition Magazine (Melbourne), Australian Art Review (Sydney), Express Magazine (New York), Meanjin (Melbourne) and Melbourne University Magazine (Melbourne).

== Publications ==
Days publications include:

- Federation Square, (Hardie Grant Books, 2003)
- Notes From The Laboratory (in prep.)
- Heroic Melbourne - Architecture of the 1950s (RMIT,1995)
- Fin de Siecle? - and the twenty-first century, part author (RMIT, 1992)
- Modern Houses: Melbourne (Zouch), 1976.
- Bell, The life and work of Guilford Bell, Architect 1912-1992, A Bookman Transition Publication, Melbourne, 1999. part author -(van Schaik, Leon, Ed.).
- AARDVARK 3 : A Selected Guide to Contemporary Melbourne Architects,- introductory essay - (also CD ROM and Internet), (Evans, Doug, Ed.) The Department of Architecture, RMIT, Melbourne, 1997.
- Puckapunyal Armoured Centre - Hopkins Barracks
- Department of Housing and Construction Melbourne. 1985.
