= Margaret Sheil =

Australian academic

Margaret Sheil AO FAA FTSE
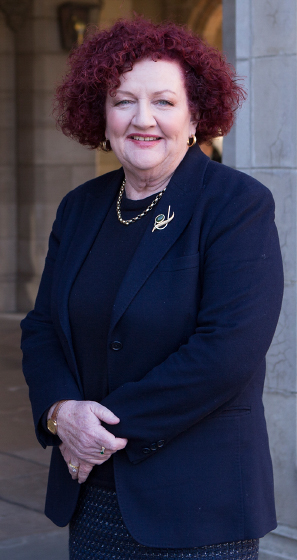

Vice-Chancellor of the Queensland University of Technology
- Incumbent
- Assumed office 2018
- Preceded by: Peter Coaldrake

Personal details
- Born: 1961 (age 64–65) Goulburn, New South Wales
- Education: University of New South Wales
- Profession: Academic

Margaret Mary Sheil is an Australian academic and the Vice Chancellor of Queensland University of Technology.

== Early years ==
Margaret Sheil was born in Goulburn, New South Wales in August 1961. As a teenager, she regularly visited the Department of Chemistry at the University of New South Wales (UNSW) where her mother, a nurse, was seconded to work on a scientific study to monitor lead levels in the blood of children exposed to petroleum. Sheil earned a Bachelor of Science and a PhD in Physical Chemistry from UNSW. Sheil accepted her first post-doctoral position at the University of Utah, followed by another at the Australian National University.

== University ==
Returning to Australia in 1990, Sheil accepted a lectureship in chemistry at the University of Wollongong. She was promoted to Professor of Chemistry in 2000, the first female chemistry professor in Australia, before becoming dean of science in 2001. The University of Wollongong Council appointed her to the role of Pro Vice-Chancellor (Research) in 2002, and then Deputy Vice-Chancellor (DVC Research) in 2005. As DVC Research, Sheil led a major change at the University of Wollongong with the aim of boosting research outcomes and developing a high performance research culture. She has been acknowledged for boosting the national/international research reputation of the university, and supporting female academics, during her time at the University of Wollongong.

Sheil's career was the chief executive officer of the Australian Research Council (2007–2012). In that role she led the development of the Excellence in Research for Australia (ERA) evaluation of Australian University Research, whilst also leading the development of a range of new funding schemes. Also in this role, Sheil sought to increase research funding for women researchers, and has been acknowledged for her efforts for keeping women in research and attracting Indigenous Australians to academia. Sheil was Provost of the University of Melbourne, from 2012 to 2017. She was appointed to the role of Vice-Chancellor of Queensland University of Technology in February 2018.

Sheil is a member of the Advisory Council of the CSIRO Science Industry Endowment Fund (SIEF), the Clunies Ross Awards Committee of ATSE and the Australia Indonesia Centre. In 2016, Sheil joined the Board on the Australian Nuclear Science and Technology Organisation (ANSTO) and the ATSE Board. She is a former member of the Prime Minister's Science, Engineering and Innovation Council (PMSEIC), a member of the University Advisory Board for Coursera, the National Research Infrastructure Council, the Cooperative Research Centre Programme and served as an Education Specialist on the Board of the Australian National Selection Commission for UNESCO. Throughout her career, Sheil has sought to find ways to progress the participation, success and recognition of girls and women in science, technology, engineering, and mathematics (STEM) fields. Sheil gave the 2014 Diana Temple Memorial Lecture at the University of Sydney charting her own experiences and life history against the backdrop of the changing constraints and opportunities that applied to women during those decades. In June 2025, she succeeded Ian Chubb as the Secretary for Science Policy at the Australian Academy of Science.

== Recognition and awards ==
Sheil received the Morrison Lecture for her contributions to mass spectrometry in Australia, and was a finalist in the AFR 100 women of Influence for 2012. The Royal Australian Chemical Institute's Margaret Sheil Leadership award was established in recognition of her work.

She is a Fellow of the Royal Australian Chemical Institute (RACI), the Australian Academy of Technological Sciences and Engineering (ATSE), and was made an inaugural fellow of the Australian and New Zealand Society for Mass Spectrometry (ANZSMS) in February 2014.

In 2017, she was appointed an Officer of the Order of Australia, for services to science and education. She was elected a Fellow of the Australian Academy of Science in May 2021.

== Controversy ==
Shiel has faced criticism for her leadership as vice-chancellor at Queensland University of Technology, which educates more than 52,000 students each year and employs 12,000 staff. She was the highest paid Queensland university VC in 2020 with a package worth at least $1.2m.

In response to claims that a lavish personal bathroom had been constructed at the university, during cuts for staff and programs, Sheil stated, "one private bathroom plus an end-of-trip facility had been added during renovations to the heritage-listed Chancellery building, as were some marble finishes in public spaces as recommended by heritage architects".

Sheil gained attention for her support of Queensland University of Technology's decision to remove all references to the word "merit" from its hiring policy, claiming that such terminology never achieves its stated goals and preferring instead to move towards a more "inclusive suitability assessment".

== Selected publications ==
- S.J. Watt, M.M. Sheil. J.L. Beck, P. Prosserlkov, G. Otting and N.E. Dixon "Effect of protein stabilisation on charge state distribution in positive- and negative-ion electrospray ionisation mass spectra." Journal of the American Society for Mass Spectrometry (2007) 18, 1605–1611
- O.K. Bernhard, J. Lai, J. Wilkinson, M.M. Sheil, A.L. Cunningham* "Proteomic analysis of DC-SIGN on dendritic cells detects tetramers required for ligand binding but no association with CD4." Journal of Biological Chemistry (2004), 279, 51828–51835
- R. Gupta, S. Hamdan, N.E. Dixon, M.M. Sheil, J.L. Beck* "Application of electrospray ionisation mass spectrometry to study the hydrophobic interactions between the ε and θ subunits of DNA polymerase III." Protein Science (2004) 13, 2878–2887
- O.K. Bernhard, A.L. Cunningham, M.M. Sheil* "Analysis of proteins copurifying with the CD4/lck complex using one-dimensional polyacrylamide gel electrophoresis and mass spectrometry: Comparison with affinity-tag based protein detection and evaluation of different solubilisation methods" Journal of the American Society for Mass Spectrometry (2004) 15, 558–567
- O.K. Bernhard, M.M. Sheil, A.L. Cunningham* "Lateral membrane protein associations of CD4 in lymphoid cells detected by cross-linking and mass spectrometry" Biochemistry (2004), 43, 256–264
- M.L. Colgrave, J.L. Beck, M.M. Sheil, M.S. Searle,* "Electrospray ionisation mass spectrometric detection of weak non-covalent interactions in nogalamycin-DNA complexes." Chemical Communications (2002) 556–557
- S. Vazquez, J.A. Aquilina, J.F. Jamie, M.M. Sheil, R.J. Truscott* "Novel protein modification by kynurenine in human lenses" Journal of Biological Chemistry (2002) 277, 4867–4873
- A. Kapur, J.L. Beck,* S.E. Brown, N.E. Dixon, M.M. Sheil "Use of electrospray ionisation mass spectrometry to study binding interactions between a replication terminator protein and DNA" Protein Science (2002), 11, 147–157
- J.L. Beck, M.L. Colgrave, S.F. Ralph, M.M. Sheil* "Electrospray ionisation mass spectrometry of oligonucleotide complexes with drugs, metals, and proteins" Mass Spectrometry Reviews (2001) Mar-Apr, 20, 61–87
- A. Kapur, J.L. Beck, M.M. Sheil* "Observation of daunomycin and nogalamycin complexes with duplex DNA using electrospray ionisation mass spectrometry." Rapid Communications in Mass Spectrometry (1999) 13, 2489–2497
- S.M. Hunt, M.M. Sheil,* M. Belov, P.J. Derrick "Probing the effects of cone potential in the electrospray ion source-consequences for the determination of molecular weight distributions of synthetic polymers" Analytical Chemistry (1998), 70 1812–1822
- P. Iannitti, M.M. Sheil*, G. Wickham* "High sensitivity and fragmentation specificity in the analysis of drug-DNA adducts by electrospray tandem mass spectrometry" Journal of the American Chemical Society (1997), 119, 1490–1491
- K.L. Bennett, S.V. Smith, R.J.W. Truscott, M.M. Sheil* "Monitoring papain digestion of a monoclonal antibody by electrospray ionisation mass spectrometry" Analytical Biochemistry (1997), 245, 17–27
- G. W. Kilby, M. M. Sheil, D. Shaw, J.J. Harding, R. J.W. Truscott* "Amino acid sequence of bovine gamma E(IV) lens crystallin" Protein Science (1997) 6, 909–912
- K.L. Bennett, S.V. Smith, R.M. Lambrecht, R.J.W. Truscott and M.M. Sheil* "Rapid characterisation of chemically-modified proteins by electrospray mass spectrometry" Bioconjugate Chemistry (1996) 7 12–18
- G.W. Kilby, G. S. Stutchbury, R.J. Truscott and M.M. Sheil* "Mass spectrometry of Lens Crystallins: Bovine β-crystallins." Rapid Communications in Mass Spectrometry (1996) 10,123–129
- G. Wickham, P. Iannitti, J. Boschenok and M.M. Sheil* "Electrospray mass spectrometry of covalent ligand-oligonucleotide adducts: evidence for specific duplex ion formation" Journal of Mass Spectrometry (1995) 30, 197–207
- M.M. Sheil, M. Guilhaus and P.J. Derrick* "Collision-activated decomposition of peptides by Fourier transform ion cyclotron resonance spectrometry" Organic Mass Spectrometry (1990), 25, 671–680
- G.M. Neumann, M.M. Sheil and P.J. Derrick "Collision-induced decomposition of multiatomic ions." Z. Naturforsch Teil A. (1984), 39, 584–592

Academic offices
Preceded by Peter Coaldrake	Vice-Chancellor of Queensland University of Technology; February 2018 – present	Incumbent
