= Clearwire =

Former U.S. telecommunications company

Clearwire Corporation
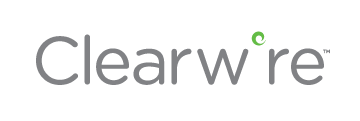
- Type: Public
- Traded as: Nasdaq: CLWR
- Industry: Wireless communications
- Founded: 1998; 28 years ago, in Arlington, Texas, United States
- Defunct: September 2013
- Fate: Acquired by Sprint Nextel, now part of T-Mobile US
- Headquarters: Bellevue, Washington, United States
- Area served: Ireland; Belgium; Spain; United States
- Key people: Erik Prusch (president/CEO); Hope Cochran (CFO); Broady Hodder (SVP General Counsel); Scott Hopper (SVP Strategy); Dr. John Saw (CTO); John W. Stanton (executive chairman)
- Operating income: ▼ (US$2,391,237,000) (2011)
- Net income: ▼ (US$357,668,000) (2011)
- Total assets: ▼US$8,842,652,000 (2011)
- Total equity: ▼US$3,646,038,000 (2011)
- Number of employees: 932 (2013)
- Parent: Sprint Corporation
- Subsidiaries: Clearwire Belgium sprl; Clearwire España S.A.; Clearwire Communications LLC
- Website: clearwire.com clear.com

Clearwire Corporation (stylized as Clearw˙re) was a telecommunications operator which provided mobile and fixed wireless broadband communications services to retail and wholesale customers in the United States, Belgium, Ireland and Spain. Clearwire traces its roots to 1998, when Sierra Technologies, Inc., spun off certain assets to form a new company, Clearwire Technologies Inc. In October 2003, Craig McCaw purchased Clearwire Technologies, Inc. parent company Clearwire Holdings and moved the company headquarters to Kirkland, Washington. In 2012, Clearwire moved the company headquarters to Bellevue, Washington.

A large percentage of Clearwire shares were previously owned by a number of large companies, including Sprint Nextel Corporation (later Sprint Corporation, which later merged with T-Mobile US), Comcast Corporation, Time Warner Cable Inc., Bright House Networks, LLC, Google Inc. and Intel Corporation. Sprint Nextel was Clearwire's largest single shareholder, owning a 50.8% combined stake and control of the company. On July 9, 2013, Sprint Nextel completed acquiring the remaining shares it did not already own, becoming sole owner of Clearwire Corporation. The day after, on July 10, 2013, Sprint Nextel and SoftBank Corp. announced the completion of their merger, where Softbank invested $21.6 billion in Sprint.

Clearwire provided services to 88 markets in the United States covering 134 million potential subscribers. Sprint Corporation owned rights to radio frequency spectrum in the 2.5 GHz range which provides service primarily using the 4G 802.16e mobile WiMAX standard. Clearwire also provided service to customers in 17 U.S. cities using the Motorola Expedience 802.16d radio interface which the company referred to as "Pre-4G".

Clearwire was ranked as the fifth largest wireless provider in the U.S., prior to being acquired, with roughly 11 million subscribers who used the WiMAX network as of January 2012. Sprint ceased operations of the Clearwire Network on November 6, 2015.

== History ==
Clearwire traces its roots to 1998, when Sierra Technologies, Inc. spun off certain assets to form a new company, Clearwire, Inc., based in Arlington, Texas. Clearwire Technologies was formed by a number of investors including Sierra CEO Jim Gero and Edward "Rusty" Rose, a former co-managing partner of the Texas Rangers. Clearwire Technologies raised about US$100 million from Goldman Sachs, in conjunction with another client who held licenses for spectrum allocated to various educational institutions; the former Instructional Television Fixed Service (ITFS) band now known as EBS or Educational Broadband Service.

After Goldman provided the funds—which were supposed to be used to roll out the system in key markets across the U.S.—they used a provision of the agreement to take control of the company; hiring a new CEO, Leo J. Cyr, who ousted the entire management team, including Clearwire CEO Brian Nerney, while diluting the strength of the founders still on the Board of Directors.

A holding company controlled by Craig McCaw, Flux LLC, acquired Clearwire Inc's then parent company, Clearwire Holdings, in March 2004. After assuming control, McCaw installed executives from McCaw Cellular in the key leadership positions at Clearwire Corp. On June 3, 2004, McCaw purchased Clearwire Inc. for an undisclosed amount and used its name and resources, as well as technology developed by another McCaw-owned company, NextNet Wireless Inc., to launch his latest effort. On October 26, 2004, Intel Corp. teamed up with McCaw to develop and deploy a technology for portable wireless Internet access. The partnership included an investment by Clearwire Corp.

Clearwire grew from 1,000 customers in September 2004 to more than 443,000 customers by May 2008. Clearwire claimed in September 2006 that 20% of its markets had more than 10% penetration of households covered.

Clearwire took a $900 million infusion of capital from Intel and Motorola in July 2006, shortly after pulling its initial public offering. Clearwire's equipment manufacturer Nextnet Wireless was sold to Motorola as part of the exchange. This investment by these two industry giants had been reported as an attempt to accelerate the development and deployment of WiMAX networks worldwide.

An unspecified source claims that AT&T sold Clearwire a slice of 2.5 GHz spectrum for about $300 million. The spectrum covers markets in the southeast of the U.S. and was formerly owned by BellSouth. The spectrum solidifies Clearwire's position as the second largest holder of 2.5 GHz spectrum after Sprint Nextel. AT&T had to sell the spectrum as a condition of its merger with BellSouth.

Clearwire and Sprint Nextel announced a partnership in July 2007 to accelerate deployment of WiMAX technology across the US. The deal was to include a swap of spectrum and markets between the two companies, as well as providing roaming capabilities for customers traveling between the companies' networks. The partnership was terminated at the end of 2007. In 2008, Sprint's new CEO Dan Hesse started serious discussions about forming a joint venture between the two companies in the hopes of bringing in outside funding from Google, Intel, and Best Buy. On March 26, 2008 an anonymous source stated that Sprint and Clearwire may get as much as $1 billion from Comcast and $500 million from Time Warner Cable in financial backing.

Clearwire filed for its initial public offering with the Securities and Exchange Commission in May 2006. The company's underwriters included Merrill Lynch, Morgan Stanley and JPMorgan Chase. Trading began March 8, 2007 under the ticker symbol "CLWR" on the Nasdaq. Clearwire offered 24 million shares at $25 a share, and raised approximately US$600 million. Before the Sprint merger, Craig McCaw was the largest shareholder of the company with a majority of the shares.

On May 7, 2008, Clearwire and Sprint Nextel's wireless broadband unit Xohm announced their intent to merge, combining Sprint's 4G WiMAX network (Xohm) with Clearwire's existing pre-WiMAX broadband network. Sprint owns 54% of the firm, with ex-Clearwire shareholders owning 27% – a consortium of Comcast, Time Warner Cable, Intel, Google, and Bright House Networks invested $3.2 billion and owns the balance. Clearwire and the cable companies will buy 3G mobile broadband from Sprint as MVNOs. Clearwire/Sprint Nextel officially launched Portland, Oregon, as the first market using the new service. Clearwire's 4G service was branded as CLEAR, except in those markets where the Clearwire name has already been established and where CLEAR service is not available. CLEAR 4G was available in 35 of the country's 40 largest metropolitan statistical areas, covering 130 million people.

On March 9, 2009, Clearwire named Bill Morrow as CEO, succeeding Benjamin Wolff, who became co-chairman with Craig McCaw. Morrow, 49, stepped down as CEO of Pacific Gas & Electric Company. Morrow had previously held a number of senior positions at Vodafone.

In April 2009, a class-action lawsuit was filed against Clearwire. The suit was dismissed in April 2009 but was appealed by the complainant. The suit claimed that the company's actual Internet connection speeds were slower than advertised and was sometimes unavailable.

On December 31, 2010, McCaw resigned as chairman of Clearwire and was replaced by John W. Stanton. On March 10, 2011, Bill Morrow resigned as CEO and was replaced by interim CEO John W. Stanton. On August 10, 2011, Clearwire promoted COO Erik Prusch to president and CEO, and named John Stanton executive chairman.

Clearwire stated that it might not honor a $237 million debt covenant due on December 1, 2011, in order to conserve cash. However, on December 2, 2011, the company announced that not only had it made that payment, but it had made a new four-year deal with Sprint to receive funding for network buildout and investments valued at $1.6 billion.

=== Complete acquisition by Sprint Nextel ===
On October 14, 2012, it was announced that Japanese telecommunications company SoftBank would purchase 70% of Sprint Nextel Corporation for $20.1 billion. This initially led to speculation that Sprint would buy out Clearwire, but "two well placed sources" within Sprint said that such a maneuver would not occur.

Sprint, however, announced on October 18, 2012, that it acquired a majority interest in Clearwire by buying a stake from Clearwire's founder, which gave Sprint a 50.8% ownership and control of Clearwire. On December 17, 2012, Sprint announced that it entered into a definitive agreement to acquire the remaining stake in Clearwire that it did not then own for $2.97 per share, which equaled $2.2 billion.

Over a period of approximately six months, a bidding war with DISH Network for Clearwire occurred, ultimately resulting in Sprint increasing its offer price for Clearwire to $5 per share. On July 8, 2013, Clearwire announced that its stockholders approved the merger with Sprint. Relatedly, Sprint's stockholders approved the merger with SoftBank, which closed on July 10, 2013. Subsequently, it planned to lay off about 75% of its employees.

CLEAR announced that it would shut down on November 5, 2015. On November 6, 2015, CLEAR service was terminated. The WiMAX network was operated, without CLEAR customers, until early March 2016 because of a court order.

== Networks ==
=== Expedience OFDM – Pre-4G ===
In 17 markets in the United States and certain markets in Belgium, Clearwire provided a service it referred to as "Pre-4G" using a point-to-multipoint system from Motorola called "Expedience", part of the MOTOwi4 family of products. The service is considered true non-line-of-sight (NLOS).

The service is not unique to Clearwire. Several companies throughout the world use this same product line from Motorola, including Inukshuk Wireless Partnership of Canada, Beamspeed and Commspeed of Arizona, AccessTEL of Bangladesh, and Unitel of Guatemala.

=== WiMAX 802.16e – 4G ===
Branded CLEAR, the company, on January 6, 2009, unveiled Portland, Oregon, as its first 4G WiMAX wireless broadband market, enabling consumers and businesses to access the Internet, wirelessly, at broadband speeds.

After the Portland launch, the company expanded its 4G network to 87 additional markets.

== Retail products and services ==
=== 4G mobile and fixed wireless ===
Logo used in the United States by Clearwire to market 4G wireless Internet services under the CLEAR brand

In the United States, Clearwire offered 4G fixed and mobile Internet access under the CLEAR brand in 88 cities. Clearwire claimed an average download speed of 3 to 6 Mbit/s with bursts over 10 Mbit/s.

In January 2011, Clearwire started offering 4G WiMax service in Spain under the Instanet brand, discontinuing services based on Motorola Expedience technology.

Logo used in Spain by Clearwire España, S.A. to market 4G wireless Internet services under the Instanet brand

Clearwire provided service in Spain in the 3.4–3.6 GHz frequency range.

Logo used in Belgium by Clearwire Belgium sprl to market 4G wireless Internet services under the Clearwire brand

Clearwire offered 4G WiMax service in Belgium under the Clearwire brand.

=== Expedience fixed wireless ===
Clearwire offered Expedience-based services in 17 markets in the United States and in certain markets in Belgium. Customers could choose either the Motorola Expedience Residential Subscriber Unit (RSU) or the Motorola Expedience PC Card in both a PC Card and ExpressCard format. The RSU incorporates automatic adaptive modulation for increased throughput and network capacity. Users are connected to the Internet at indoor locations throughout the entire system's coverage area. The unit functions as an Ethernet bridge (Layer 2) device, interfacing a standard Ethernet over twisted pair connector. The PC Card incorporates the same automatic adaptive modulation for increased throughput and network capacity with the added portability of a laptop CardBus card.

Clearwire formerly offered Expedience-based services in Ireland and Denmark until operations in those countries were purchased by Imagine Communications and ERLO Group, respectively. In January 2011 Clearwire discontinued services based on Motorola Expedience technology in Spain in favor of Instanet-branded 4G WiMAX service.

=== VoIP ===
Clearwire also offered its own Voice over IP (VoIP) service in some areas for an additional monthly fee.

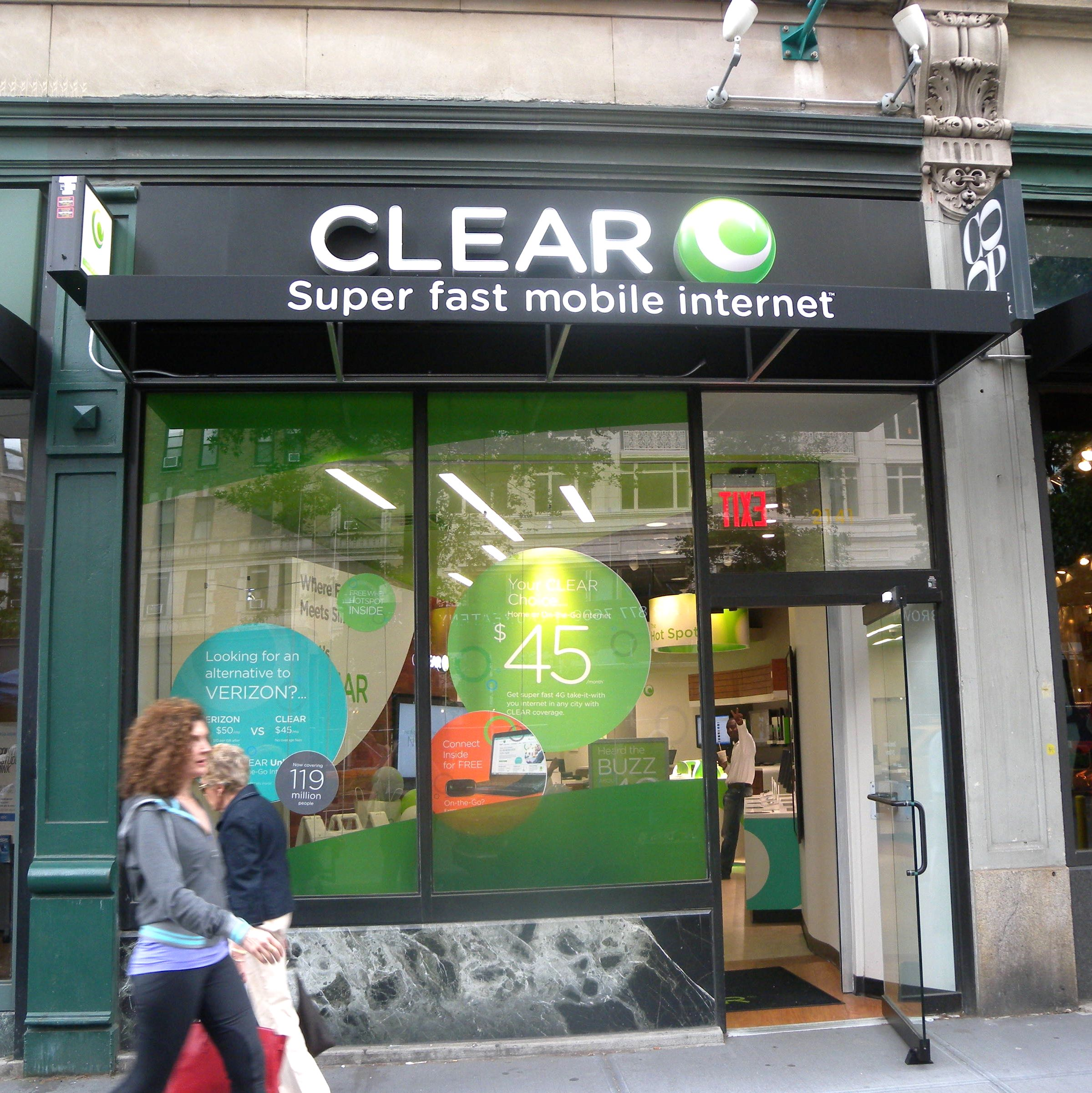
Clear wireless retail store in the borough of Manhattan, New York, New York, United States

== Wholesale products and services ==
Sprint Corporation (Clearwire's parent company) resold Clearwire's 4G network service as Sprint 4G WiMax in over 70 markets across the United States. Other Clearwire investors Comcast and Time Warner Cable resold Clearwire's 4G mobile broadband service in a number of markets, including New York City, Los Angeles, Chicago, Philadelphia, Atlanta and Portland among others bundled with their cable, home phone, and residential Internet services.

On June 4, 2010, Sprint Nextel introduced the first commercially available 4G cellphone in the U.S., the HTC EVO 4G. The device combines Clearwire's 4G network with Sprint's 3G network and Google's Android operating system, creating a multimedia-heavy device Sprint hoped would set it apart from 3G smartphones like the Apple iPhone.

== Criticism ==
In 2005, Clearwire drew criticism from phone operator Vonage. Vonage claimed Clearwire and other ISPs were blocking Vonage's services. Testing showed that contrary to Vonage's claims, Vonage calls were being connected over the Clearwire network.

In September 2010, Clearwire introduced a dynamic network management system, which, for users who consume "disproportionate" amounts of wireless data, limited the user to about 256 kbit/s of network throughput. Certain users claimed its terms of service were modified retroactively to reflect the new policy, and Clearwire itself unofficially acknowledged this claim.

In the middle of 2012, Clearwire reached a settlement to provide partial refunds of termination fees and service credits for individuals who experienced throttling as part of its dynamic network management policy. The settlement allowed Clearwire to continue throttling connections under certain circumstances as long as its advertising reflects this.

In September 2013, Clearwire in Spain, operating under the brand Instanet, cut off all of its services, web and phone lines without prior notice. It was reported at the time that Spanish consumer associations were gathering evidence of possible overcharging.

== See also ==
- Sprint Corporation
- Google
- Virgin Mobile USA
- Mobile broadband
- Wireless broadband
- Wireless internet service provider
