= Dennis Gibson (academic) =

R. Dennis Gibson AO, FAICD

Chancellor of the Royal Melbourne Institute of Technology
- In office 2003–2010
- Vice Chancellor: Ruth Dunkin; Margaret Gardner
- Succeeded by: Ziggy Switkowski

Vice-Chancellor of the Queensland University of Technology
- In office 1982–2003
- Succeeded by: Peter Coaldrake

Personal details
- Born: Robert Dennis Gibson; 13 April 1942 (age 84) Newcastle upon Tyne, England, United Kingdom
- Education: University of Hull; Newcastle University
- Profession: Academic

Robert Dennis Gibson AO (born 13 April 1942) is a British-born Australian academic and mathematician.

He was the chancellor of the Royal Melbourne Institute of Technology (RMIT University) in Melbourne, Australia, from 2003 to 2010.

He is a member of the Council of Bond University on the Gold Coast, Australia, and a visiting professor at the University of Greenwich in London, England. He served as the Vice-Chancellor of the Queensland University of Technology in Brisbane, Australia, for 21 years, before he retired in 2003 and was appointed the Chancellor of RMIT.

== Education ==
Prof. Gibson earned a degree in science with first class honours from the University of Hull in 1963. He later earned a master's degree in science and a Doctorate of Philosophy, with a thesis on magnetohydrodynamics, from Newcastle University in 1967. In 1987, he was awarded a Higher Doctorate of Science by the UK's Council for National Academic Awards.

== Career ==
=== Academic ===
Prof. Gibson was a lecturer at Teesside University from 1969 to 1977. He advised James Caldwell, culminating in Caldwell's PhD thesis in 1974. His first executive position was at Northumbria University, where he was Head of the Department of Mathematics, Science and Computing between 1977 and 1982.

Shortly after he moved to Australia in 1982, he served as Deputy Director, and later the Director, of the Queensland Institute of Technology (the antecedent of the Queensland University of Technology). After the institute became a university in 1988 he served as its Vice-Chancellor until 2003. On 13 April of the same year, he was appointed the chancellor of RMIT, taking over from former CEO of ANZ Bank, Donald Mercer.

In 2005, he became a member of the Council of Bond University, and a visiting professor at the University of Greenwich.

He retired as Chancellor of RMIT in 2010, and was succeeded by Dr Ziggy Switkowski.

=== Other leadership ===
Currently, Prof. Gibson is the chairman of two technology companies as well as the Premier of Queensland's Smart Awards Committee; a trustee of the RMIT Foundation and a member of the International Assessment Panel for the Irish Higher Education Authority.

=== Works ===
Prof. Gibson has also authored over 100 publications on applied mathematics and higher education policy and management.

== Honours ==
In 2002, he was made an Officer of the Order of Australia in recognition of his contribution to education. In 2001, he was awarded the Centenary Medal. He was elected a Fellow of the Australian Academy of Technological Sciences and Engineering in 1993.

He holds honorary doctorates from the Queensland University of Technology and University of the Sunshine Coast.

Academic offices
Preceded by Donald Mercer	Chancellor of RMIT University; 2003–2010	Succeeded by Ziggy Switkowski
