= Martin Bean =

Australian academic administrator

Martin Bean CBE AM
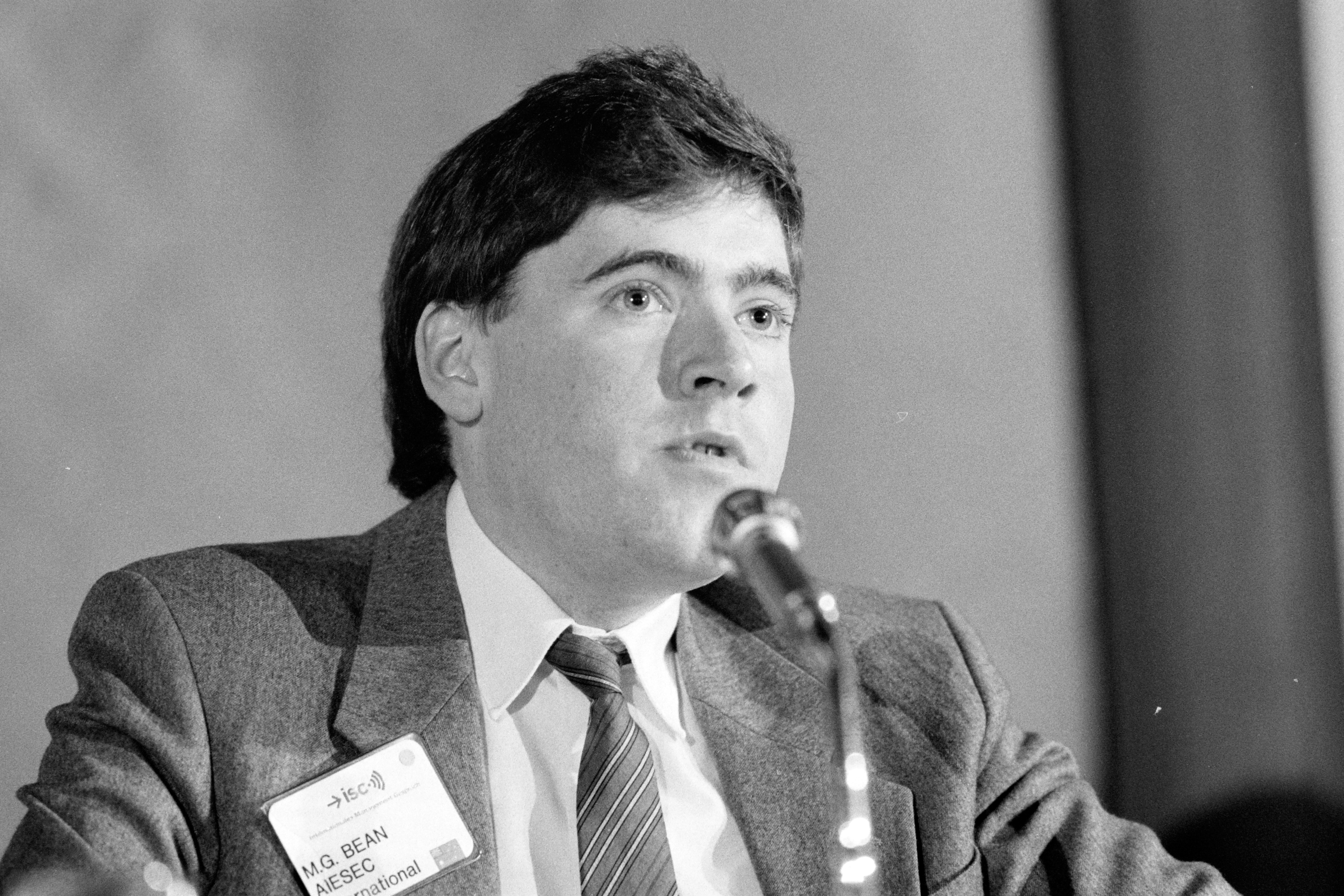
- Bean in 1987

Vice-Chancellor and President of the Royal Melbourne Institute of Technology
- In office February 2015 – June 2021
- Chancellor: Ziggy Switkowski
- Preceded by: Margaret Gardner
- Succeeded by: Alec Cameron

Personal details
- Born: 26 October 1964 (age 61) Melbourne, Victoria, Australia
- Education: University of Technology, Sydney (B.Ed); University of London (LL.D)
- Profession: Education management

Martin George Bean CBE AM (born 26 October 1964) is an Australian education administrator. He served as the Vice-Chancellor of the Royal Melbourne Institute of Technology (RMIT), from 2015 to 2021. He was Vice-Chancellor of Open University from 2009 to 2015.

== Education and early career ==
Born in Melbourne, Australia on 26 October 1964, Bean has a bachelor's degree in adult education from the University of Technology, Sydney. As a student, he served as president of AIESEC. Bean worked at companies including Novell, Sylvan Learning, Thomson Learning and New Horizons Computer Learning Centres before joining Microsoft, where he became general manager responsible for product management, marketing and business development in the Worldwide Education Products Group.

== University career ==
Bean's appointment as vice-chancellor of the Open University was the first time a non-academic had been chosen to head the university. He stated his aim was to use technology in order to provide an education to anyone at low or no cost. This included the university's iTunes U downloads.

In December 2012, Bean launched FutureLearn, an online initiative supporting a Massive Open Online Course (MOOC) platform, led by The Open University in partnership with 11 other UK universities. Since its launch, FutureLearn has partnered with 15 other universities in the UK, Ireland, Australia and New Zealand, as well as the British Library, British Council and British Museum.

In 2013, Bean oversaw the release of OU Anywhere, an app which allows students to access OU undergraduate course materials using smartphones and tablets. Bean also oversaw the launch of the Teacher Education through the school-based support in India project (TESS-India), a program in collaboration with the Indian government to bring distance learning teacher education resources to educators in India.

Under a program of reforms spearheaded by Bean, the Open University has dismantled its presence in mainland Europe. This drew criticism from University and College Union, who claimed this would have a negative effect on OU students based outside the UK. The University has maintained that the move will bring support for overseas students into line with that offered to their UK-based counterparts while also making financial savings made necessary by the UK government’s 2012 changes to higher education funding.

Bean's last controversial move was the announcement by the vice-chancellor's executive that the Open University's south-east regional centre in East Grinstead is to be closed and that the status of the other English regional offices is to be "reviewed". In a letter to The Guardian, Open University staff claim that overall, some 700 jobs could be at risk, almost a fifth of the OU's full-time workforce.

On 10 July 2014 he was appointed vice-chancellor and president of RMIT University, and took up the appointment in February 2015.

He was appointed CBE in the 2015 New Year Honours. In the 2026 King's Birthday Honours, he was appointed a Member of the Order of Australia in recognition of his "significant service to tertiary education governance, to digital learning, and to business".

== Board positions ==
Bean is on the Board of Trustees of the British Council, the Board of the Commonwealth of Learning and the British Museum’s Digital Advisory Group. In addition, he has served as a member of the Workforce Training and Education Coordinating Board and the National Board of Directors of Jobs for America’s Graduates as well as advising the US Senate on the importance of IT in the Workforce Investment Act. He was also part of U.S. Department of Labor delegations to the US/EU Seminar on Local Employment Development and to the Economic and Employment Development Seminar in Hanoi, Vietnam.

Academic offices
Preceded by Margaret Gardner	Vice-Chancellor of RMIT University; 2015–2021	Succeeded by Alec Cameron
