= James Caldwell (mathematician) =

Northern Irish mathematician (1943–2024)

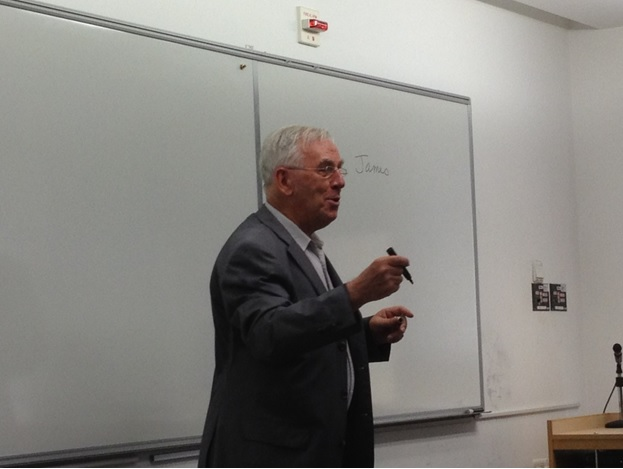
- Caldwell in 2014
- Born: 16 May 1943; Macosquin, Northern Ireland, United Kingdom
- Died: 27 July 2024 (aged 81); Queen Elizabeth Hospital, Hong Kong
- Education: Coleraine Academical Institution; Queen's University of Belfast
- Occupations: Professor, mathematician

James Caldwell (16 May 1943 – 27 July 2024) was a Northern Irish mathematician.

== Education ==
Caldwell was educated at Macosquin Primary School, then Coleraine Academical Institution followed by Queen's University of Belfast; Professor James Caldwell obtained his BSc (1st Class Hons.) degree in applied mathematics and his MSc degree in numerical analysis from Queen's University Belfast in 1964 and 1966, respectively. In 1974 he was awarded his PhD degree in "Magnetostatic Field Calculations", under Dennis Gibson, from Teesside University.

Professor Caldwell was awarded his first higher doctorate (DSc) degree by Queen's University of Belfast in 1985 for his research and scholarly work on "Mathematical Solution of Physical Problems Particularly Involving Magnetostatic Fields" and his second DSc by Teesside University in 2007 in recognition of his research and scholarly work in Mathematical Modelling.

== Career ==
He took up various teaching posts in the UK before moving to Australia as Head of Mathematics at the University of Southern Queensland in Toowoomba. He then returned to England to lecture at Sunderland University and worked in lecturing and research posts at a number of UK universities. In 1990 he joined the City University of Hong Kong Department of Mathematics.

Similar with his academic career, Professor Caldwell worked for a number of large organizations including the role as Head of Modelling with Unilever Research UK. Through his research work, he has published hundreds of journal research papers and conference papers, and more than a dozen textbooks and theses. As a result of scientific publications, he has had extensive experience in editorial work involving mathematics. Furthermore, he has had extensive experience of course development work in mathematics at a number of universities in the UK and overseas. On retirement he continued at City University of Hong Kong up to 2010 and was adjunct professor in the Department of Mathematics until 2012. More recently he formed strong links with the Open University of Hong Kong.

Professor Caldwell had extensive experience of mathematical modelling throughout his career in both university teaching and industry and was instructor for a team of three Hong Kong mathematics undergraduate students, who won the first place award, Meritorious, in the 2000 Netease Cup China Undergraduate Mathematical Contest in Modelling (CUMCM).

Caldwell authored a number of postgraduate textbooks in mathematical modeling and edited a number of annual conference proceedings linked to POLYMODEL (i.e. North East Polytechnics Mathematical Modelling & Computer Simulation Group).

Professor Caldwell was invited by the Open University of Hong Kong (OUHK) to take on the role of Honorary Professor (Mathematics & Statistics) for the period 2013–2019.

Also Professor Caldwell has been awarded Honorary Doctorate in Professional Achievement by Teesside University in 2014.

On 27 July 2024, he died peacefully and surrounded by family in Hong Kong at Queen Elizabeth Hospital due to complications arising from prostate cancer.
