= Bill Morrow (executive) =

American businessman (born 1959)

- Born: William T. Morrow; 1959 (age 66–67)
- Education: National University in San Diego
- Occupation: Telecommunications Executive
- Employer(s): Pacific Bell, Vodafone, Pacific Gas and Electric Company, Clearwire, Vodafone Hutchison Australia, nbn™, Directv

Bill Morrow (born 1959) is the former CEO of NBN Co, a government-owned corporation responsible for installation and implementation of the National Broadband Network across Australia. His departure was announced in April 2018 and became effective on 1 September 2018. He became CEO of DirecTV in February, 2021.

== Career ==
From 1980 to 1995, Morrow was Director of Network Data Products at Pacific Bell. He then worked as CEO of the European division at Vodafone Group PLC from 1996 to July 24, 2006.

Morrow was President and CEO of Pacific Gas and Electric Company from 2006 to 2008. He then migrated to become CEO of Clearwire in March 2009, where he served in that position until March 1o, 2011.

He went back to Vodafone in 2012, this time working at its Australia (VHA) division as CEO. Morrow left Vodafone in March 2014 and became CEO of NBN Co. He remained in that position until September 2018.

From October 2019 to February 2021, Morrow was special adviser and managing director of process service and cost optimization at AT&T. On February 25, 2021, AT&T announced that it would spin-off DirecTV into a separate entity, selling a 30% stake to TPG Inc., while retaining a 70% stake in the new standalone company. The deal closed on August 2, 2021, with Morrow acting as CEO of DirecTV.

Business positions
Preceded by	Chief Executive of Vodafone UK; February 2004 - March 2005	Succeeded by
Preceded by	Chief Executive of Vodafone Japan; April 2005 – April 2006	Succeeded by
Preceded by Ziggy Switkowski	Chief Executive of nbn™ 2 April 2014 – 1 Sept 2018	Succeeded by Stephen Rue
