= Tertiary Education Quality and Standards Agency =

Australian government agency

Tertiary Education Quality and Standards Agency (TEQSA)

Agency overview
- Formed: 2011; 15 years ago
- Jurisdiction: Australia
- Headquarters: Melbourne, Victoria, Australia
- Agency executive: Mary Russell, CEO
- Website: www.teqsa.gov.au

The Tertiary Education Quality and Standards Agency (TEQSA) is Australia's independent national quality assurance and regulatory agency for higher education.

The agency's purpose is to protect student interests and the reputation of Australia's higher education sector through a proportionate, risk-reflective approach to quality assurance that supports diversity, innovation and excellence.

All organisations that offer higher education qualifications (diploma or above) in or from Australia must be registered by TEQSA. Higher education providers that have not been granted self-accrediting authority must also have their courses of study accredited by the agency. Australian universities have self-accrediting authority and are not required to have their courses accredited by TEQSA.

The Australian higher education sector includes public and private universities, Australian branches of overseas universities, TAFEs, government agencies, professional bodies, faith-based colleges and other independent for-profit and not-for-profit providers.

== Operational activities ==
The Tertiary Education Quality and Standards Agency Act 2011 (TEQSA Act) calls the agency to:

- Register regulated entities as higher education providers and accredit their courses of study
- Assess the compliance of registered higher education providers with the Higher Education Standards Framework
- Provide advice and make recommendations to the Commonwealth Minister responsible for Education on matters relating to the quality and regulation of higher education providers
- Cooperate with similar agencies in other countries
- Collect, analyse, interpret and disseminate information relating to higher education providers, higher education awards, quality assurance practice and quality improvement in higher education.

== Governance ==
TEQSA Commissioners are appointed by the Commonwealth Minister for Education and are responsible for making major regulatory decisions, setting strategic directions, monitoring risk in the sector and deciding on matters relating to the development of the agency's quality assurance and regulatory functions. The Commissioners are TEQSA's accountable authority. Following the resignation of Peter Coaldrake as Chief Commissioner, Adrienne Nieuwenhuis has been Acting Chief Commissioner since 11 May 2024. Stephen Somogyi is the sole commissioner.

The Chief Executive Officer and a team of Senior Managers oversees the work of the agency and supports the Commission. The current CEO is Mary Russell.

TEQSA's Corporate Plan sets out the agency's activities and priorities, and performance is documented in the Annual Report.

- Higher education courses
- Foundation Programs (except those delivered by schools)
- English Language Intensive Courses for Overseas Students (ELICOS) programs delivered under an entry arrangement with a higher education provider.

== National Register of Higher Education providers ==
TEQSA maintains an online public register of all higher education providers and their accredited courses of study. The register is the authoritative source of information on the status of registered higher education providers in Australia.

Regulatory action commonly ranges (escalates) from TEQSA:

1. Providing education and support, to
2. Communication of concerns in writing, to
3. Requesting information and reporting, to
4. Imposing conditions on provider's registration and/or conditions on course accreditation, to
5. Approving registration or accreditation for a period less than the full seven years, to
6. Cancelling registration.

== History ==
In 2008, the Australian Government initiated a Review of Australian Higher Education to examine and report on the future direction of the sector, its fitness for purpose in meeting the needs of the Australian community and economy, and options for reform.

This Review, also known as the Bradley Review, recommended a new, independent national regulatory body be responsible for all types of higher education. The review team decided that a national approach would provide a more effective, streamlined and integrated sector, achieving a sustainable and responsible higher education system.

The Australian Government responded to the Bradley Review in 2009, announcing a reform package for higher education. This package expanded the system and was intended to create new opportunities for all Australians to reach their potential in higher education.

The Government also committed to ensuring that growth in the sector was underpinned by a robust quality assurance and regulatory framework with an emphasis on student outcomes and the quality of the student experience.

TEQSA was established by the Government as Australia's higher education regulation and quality assurance agency in 2011, with a focus on ensuring that higher education providers meet minimum standards, promote best practice and improve the quality of the Australian higher education sector.

In 2012, TEQSA assumed regulatory powers under the TEQSA and ESOS Acts. In 2013, following the expression of some concerns from providers about the burden of TEQSA's regulatory approach, the Review of Higher Education Regulation Report was released, and in 2014, a significantly streamlined Revised Risk Assessment Framework was adopted. The Higher Education Standards Framework was reviewed in 2015 and became effective in January 2017. The impact of the TEQSA Act was reviewed in 2016-17 and, in 2019, a bill to implement the recommendations of the review was introduced to the Australian Parliament.

In June 2020 the Australian Government announced a new Higher Education Integrity Unit would be established within TEQSA. The unit will identify and analyse emerging threats and assist the sector to address them, in areas such as academic and research integrity, cyber security, foreign interference and admission standards. The new unit commenced operations in January 2021.

== See also ==
- Australian Qualifications Framework
- Tertiary education in Australia
- Department of Education (Australia)
