= Sharon Pickering (academic) =

Vice-Chancellor of Monash University

Sharon Pickering FASSA
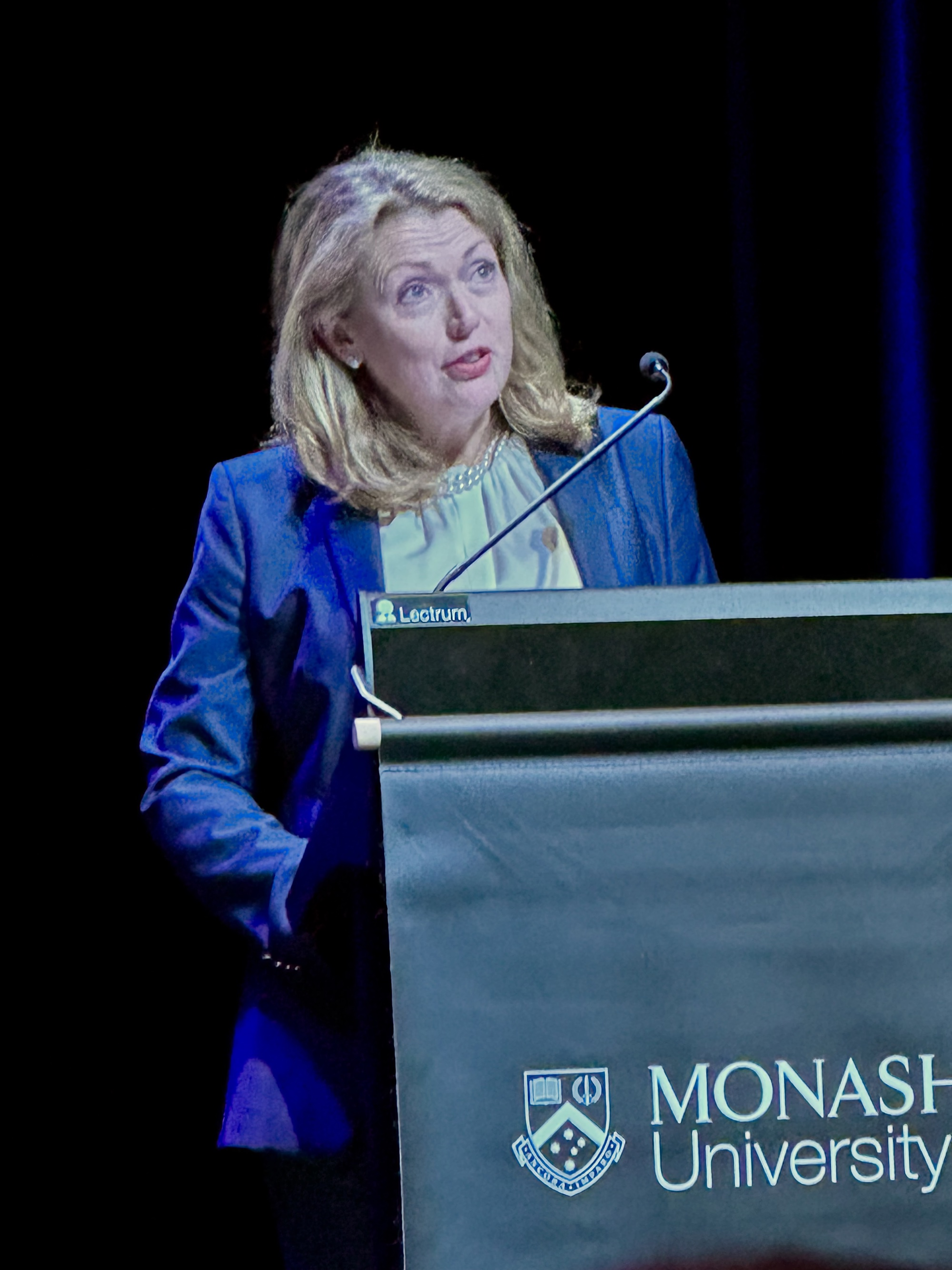
- Pickering in 2025
- Awards: Australian Human Rights Award for Print and Online Media (2012); Fellow of the Academy of the Social Sciences in Australia (2018)

Academic background
- Education: University of Melbourne (BA, PhD); University of Southampton (MA)
- Thesis: Women, Policing, and Resistance in Northern Ireland

Academic work
- Discipline: Criminology

Sharon Pickering FASSA is an academic who has served as the Vice-Chancellor of Monash University since 2024.

Pickering graduated from the University of Melbourne with a PhD in 2000 for her thesis Women, policing and resistance in Northern Ireland.

Pickering is a scholar of criminology who earned her the Australian Human Rights Commission Award.

In 2018, she was made a Fellow of the Australian Academy of the Social Sciences.

Academic offices
Preceded by Margaret Gardner	Vice-Chancellor of Monash University; 2024–present	Incumbent
