= Peter Coaldrake =

Professor Emeritus Peter Coaldrake AO
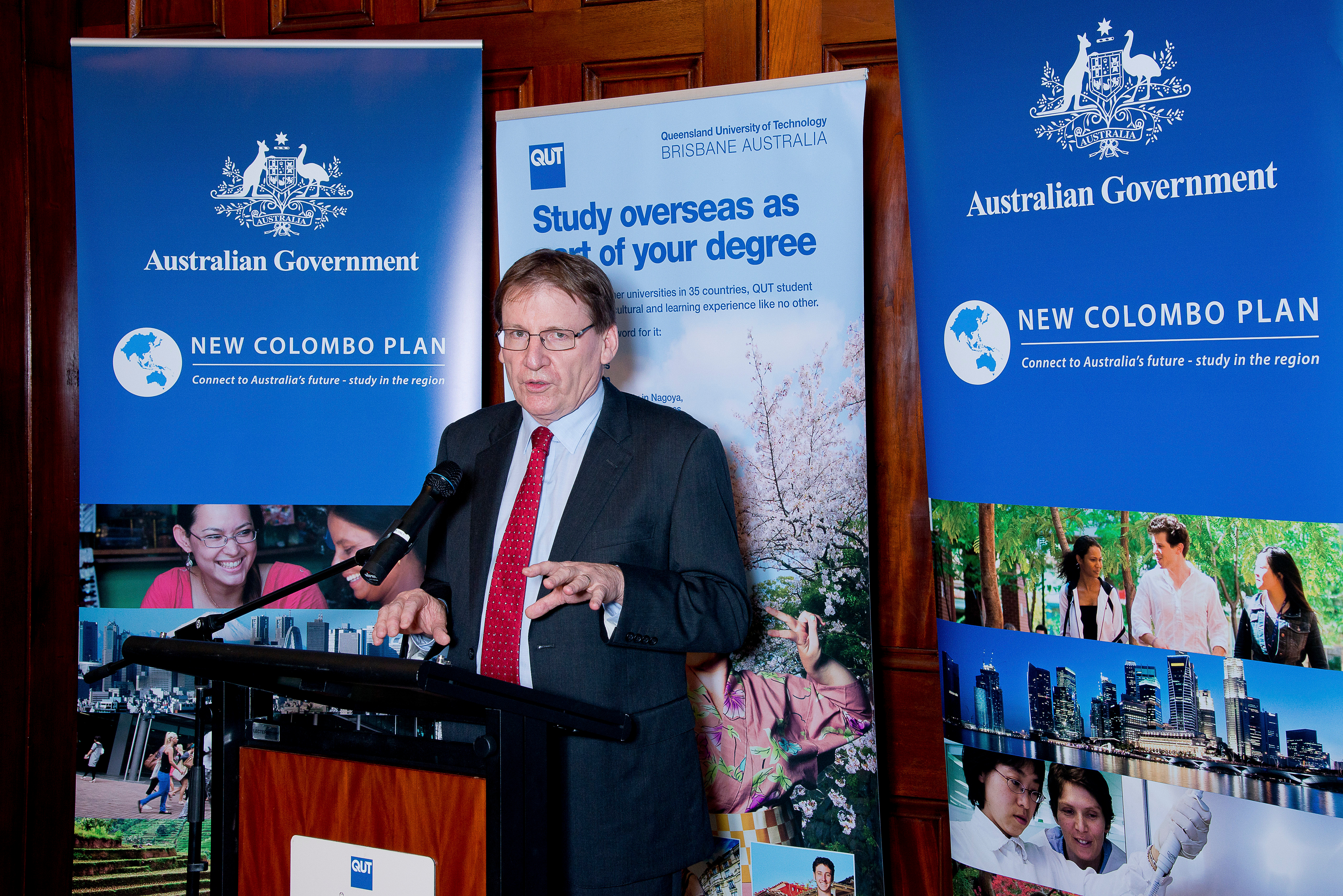
- Coaldrake in 2014

Vice-Chancellor of the Queensland University of Technology
- In office 2003–2017
- Preceded by: Dennis Gibson
- Succeeded by: Margaret Sheil

Personal details
- Born: Gregory Alan Naylor; 1951 (age 74–75) Marrickville, New South Wales
- Education: James Cook University; Griffith University
- Profession: Academic

Owen Peter Coaldrake AO (born 1951) is an Australian academic and higher education administrator. He served as Vice-Chancellor of the Queensland University of Technology between 2003 and 2017.

== Early life ==
Peter Coaldrake was born Gregory Alan Naylor to a young mother Jeanette in Marrickville. He was adopted as the only child of Anglican missionaries, Keith and Sheila Coaldrake. He was educated in Queensland, and graduated with a Bachelor of Arts (Honours) from James Cook University and a PhD from Griffith University.

== Career ==
Coaldrake was appointed by Queensland Premier Wayne Goss to be CEO of the Public Sector Management Commission. He served as Vice-Chancellor of the Queensland University of Technology between 2003 and 2017, replaced by Margaret Sheil. He was Chair of Universities Australia.

Coaldrake's decision to close QUT's school of humanities and human services drew the wrath of staff and academic unions. "Many humanities staff see this as the Philistines at the gate."

From 2011 to 2016, Coaldrake was the chair of the Queensland Heritage Council. Two notable listings added to the Queensland Heritage Register under his leadership were the Fantome Island Lock Hospital and Lazaret Sites and the Queensland Cultural Centre.

Coaldrake was appointed an Officer of the Order of Australia in 2011 for "distinguished service to higher education".

In October 2017 Coaldrake became chair of the Queensland Performing Arts Trust. He was appointed chair of Jobs Queensland at the end of 2018. Since March 2019 Coaldrake has been a member of the Council of the University of Newcastle.

== Publications ==
- Coaldrake, O.P. 1989 Working the System, Government in Queensland (University of Queensland Press)
- Coaldrake, O.P. and Stedman, L. 1998. On the Brink. Australia's Universities Confronting their Future. (University of Queensland Press)
- Coaldrake, O.P. and Stedman, L. Academic Work in the Twenty-First Century (DETYA, Occasional Paper Series 99-4).

Academic offices
Preceded by Dennis Gibson	Vice-Chancellor of Queensland University of Technology; 2003 – 2017	Succeeded by Margaret Sheil
