= National Tertiary Education Union =

Australian trade union for higher education and university employees

- National Tertiary Education Industry Union
- Founded: 1993
- Headquarters: Melbourne, Victoria
- Location: Australia
- Members: ▲27,980 (as at 31 December 2024)
- Key people: Dr Alison Barnes (National President); Associate Professor Damien Cahill (General Secretary); Gabe Gooding (National Assistant Secretary)
- Affiliations: ACTU, EI
- Website: www.nteu.au

The National Tertiary Education Union (NTEU) is an Australian trade union for all higher education and university employees. It is an industry union, and the only union working exclusively in the Australian university sector, representing both professional and academic workers.

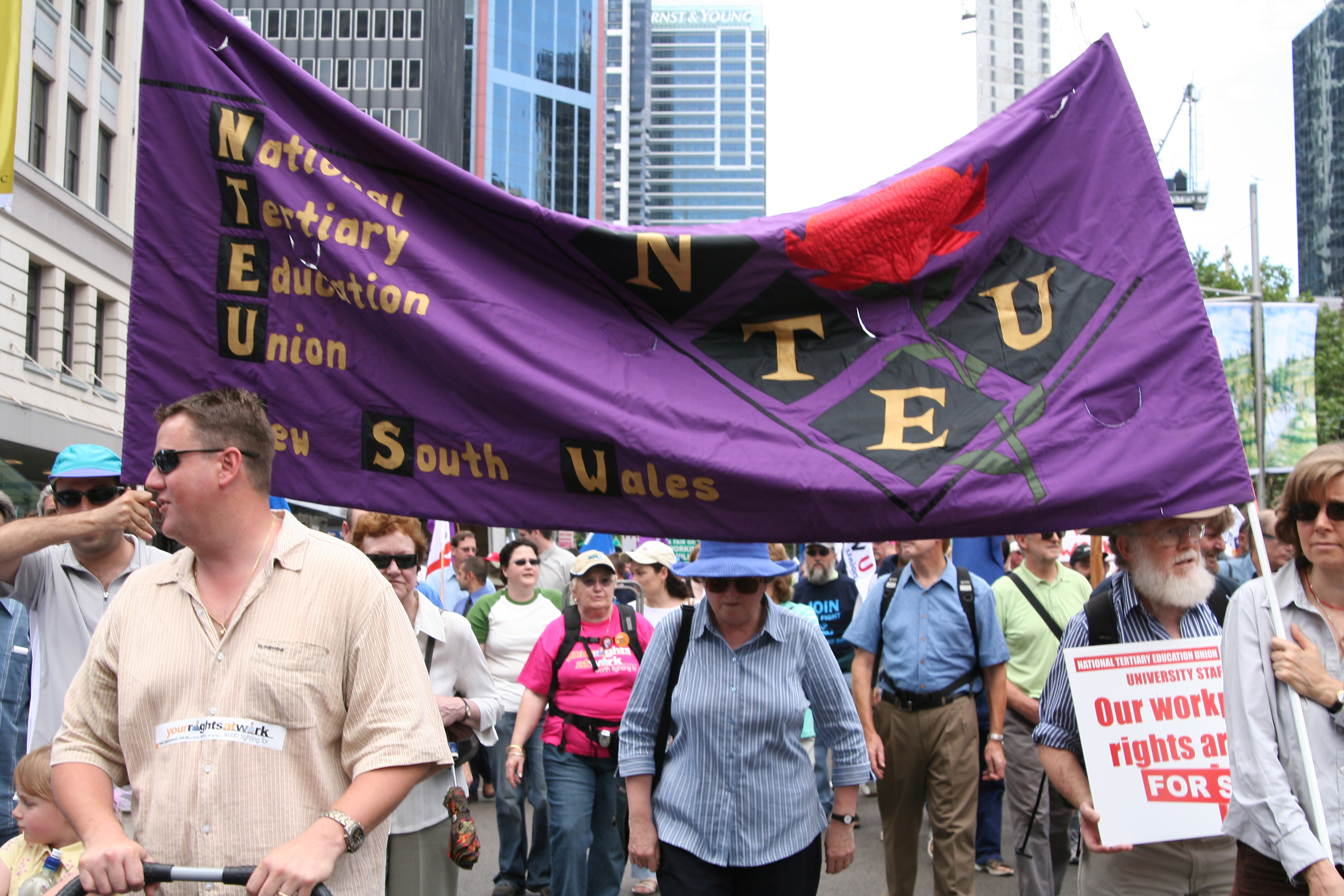
NTEU workers protest Howard's IR reforms

== Overview ==
The NTEU is a specialist national union solely representing staff in tertiary education. In all Australian universities, the NTEU represents professional staff, academic staff, research staff, general staff, ELICOS teachers, and staff of Student Unions and university companies. In Victoria, the NTEU also represents TAFE general staff and all staff in Adult Education as well as staff of independent research institutes. The Union plays a key role in negotiating Enterprise Agreements governing pay and conditions of University workers.

The NTEU was formed out of previous tertiary education staff associations, principally the Federation of University Staff Associations and the Federation of College Academics. It is generally considered to be more towards the left of the union movement, and has a high focus on self-directed membership branches and the organising model of unionism. The NTEU often engages in organising campaigns to build its membership density.

The Union has a federal structure with state-based Divisions. Union policy is made through its National Council, made up of Councillors elected from each local Branch.

The NTEU is not affiliated with any Australian political party.

== Campaigns ==
Ending Bad Governance for Good is a major national campaign focused on improving governance of Universities and highlighting systematic wage theft in the sector.

Our Universities Matter is a major national campaign being run by the NTEU, launched in 2008.

The campaign seeks to:

- Achieve higher levels of government funding and better funding mechanisms.
- Protect university independence and freedom of inquiry.
- Introduce controls on excessive workloads, better job security and a competitive pay rise for university staff.
- Win a better deal for students around affordability and improved student services.

Academic Freedom Watch is a site established to promote academic freedom in Australia's universities. Created by the Victorian Division, the site includes debates and articles written by high-profile academics in this area.

Our TAFEs Matter is the campaign to promote Victoria's TAFE system, which is being undermined by changes in funding systems by the Victorian Government. The changes would introduce a HECS-style loan scheme, more than double student fees and reduce public TAFE funding certainty. During 2019 and 2020 members at the University of Melbourne formed a casuals network. This ran campaigns against underpayment which culminated in the university repaying $45 million in wages to current and former staff.

=== Sentry ===
Sentry was the NTEU's online magazine for all members during the pandemic. It was published monthly between issues of Advocate from 2020 to 2022. It contained updates on campaigns and policy work, member stories and information from member experts.

== Publications ==
The NTEU publishes:

- Advocate – a triannual members' journal (ISSN 1329-7295)
- Australian Universities' Review – a biennual scholarly journal (ISSN 0818-8068)
- Agenda – an annual women's magazine (ISSN 1839-6186)
- Connect – a biennual magazine for university casuals (ISSN 1836-8522)
