= Peggy O'Neal (lawyer) =

Australian lawyer and football president (born 1952)

Peggy O'Neal AO
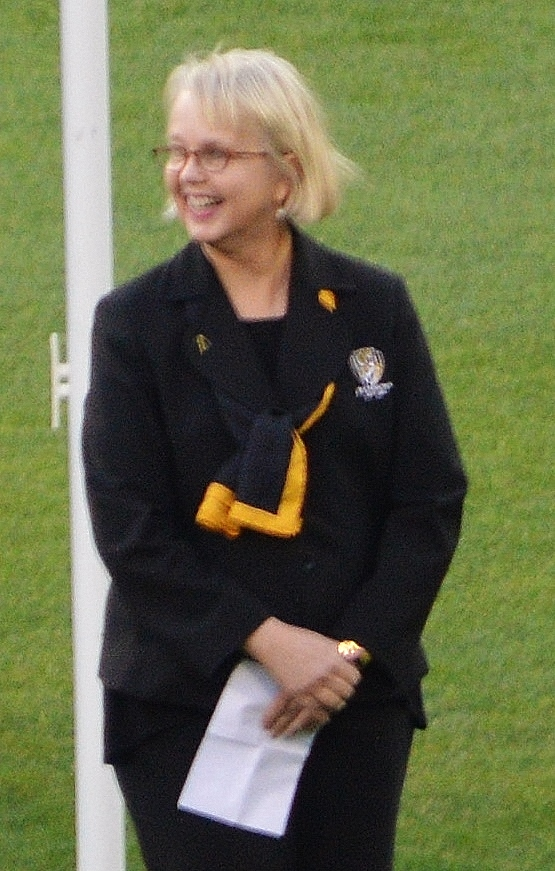
- O'Neal at the unfurling ceremony for Richmond's 2017 AFL Premiership flag

Chancellor of the Royal Melbourne Institute of Technology
- Incumbent
- Assumed office January 2022
- Vice Chancellor: Alec Cameron
- Preceded by: Ziggy Switkowski

Personal details
- Born: Peggy Yvonne O'Neal; 19 April 1952 (age 74) Killarney, West Virginia, USA

Peggy Yvonne O'Neal AO (born 19 April 1952) is an American-born Australian lawyer who, from 2013 to 2022, served as the president of the Richmond Football Club in the Australian Football League (AFL). She is the first woman in AFL history to serve as a club president. Since January 2022, she has served as Chancellor of RMIT University.

== Early life and education ==
Peggy Yvonne O'Neal was born on 19 April 1952 and raised in the now-abandoned small mining community of Killarney, West Virginia. She comes from the family of coal miner, and was the first in her family to go to university, studying law at the University of Virginia.

== Career ==
=== Law ===
O'Neal moved to Australia in 1989, after falling in love with an Australian backpacker while on holiday in Greece. She settled in the suburb of Richmond, Victoria, where she was introduced to football by friends.

O'Neal worked as a lawyer with Herbert Smith Freehills and later with Lander & Rogers, and served on the boards of MLC Limited and the Commonwealth Superannuation Corporation. She was also chair of the Law Council of Australia's superannuation committee, and served as a consultant to the Rudd Government's review of the superannuation system.

=== Football administration ===
After moving to the suburb of Richmond, O'Neal became a fan of the club due to sheer proximity, and later became financially supportive, acting as a player sponsor. In 2003, she worked on the establishment of a club supporters’ business networking group, the Tommy Hafey Club.

In 2005, O'Neal was elected to the board of the Richmond Football Club. She chaired the board's risk and compliance committee and was a member of the governance committee, as well as being chair of the Tigers in Community Foundation.

O'Neal was elected club president in October 2013, in place of the retiring Gary March. She defeated two other candidates, investment banker Maurice O'Shannassy and former International Cricket Council CEO Malcolm Speed, becoming the first woman elected president of any AFL club.

As president, O'Neal oversaw Richmond's 2017 premiership win – the club's first since 1980 and Richmond’s 2019 and 2020 Grand final wins – as well as its successful bid for an AFL Women's team, set to enter the competition in 2020. Following a disappointing 2016 season, she had been subject to an unsuccessful board challenge.

In March 2022, O'Neal announced her intention to step down as club president by the end of the year. John O’Rourke succeeded O'Neal in December 2022.

=== University administration ===
O'Neal succeeded Ziggy Switkowski as Chancellor of RMIT University in January 2022.

== Recognition and honours ==
In 2014, The Australian Financial Review named O'Neal in its list of "Top 100 Women of Influence".

In 2019, she was appointed an Officer of the Order of Australia (AO) for distinguished service to Australian rules football, to superannuation and finance law, and to the advancement of women in leadership roles.

She was appointed Chancellor of RMIT University in October 2021.

== In the media ==
O'Neal features in the 2021 fly-on-the-wall documentary TV series Making Their Mark, which showed the impact of the COVID-19 pandemic on several AFL clubs, players, and staff. Players Nic Naitanui, Eddie Betts, Stephen Coniglio, and Rory Sloane, were featured, along with Gold Coast Suns football club coach Stuart Dew, and Richmond staff leaders O'Neal, Damien Hardwick, and Brendon Gale.

== See also ==
- List of VFL/AFL commissioners and club presidents

External videos
- One Plus One: Peggy O'Neal, One Plus One, ABC News

Academic offices
Preceded by Ziggy Switkowski	Chancellor of RMIT University; 2022–	Incumbent
