= Alec Cameron (academic) =

Australian academic (born 1963)

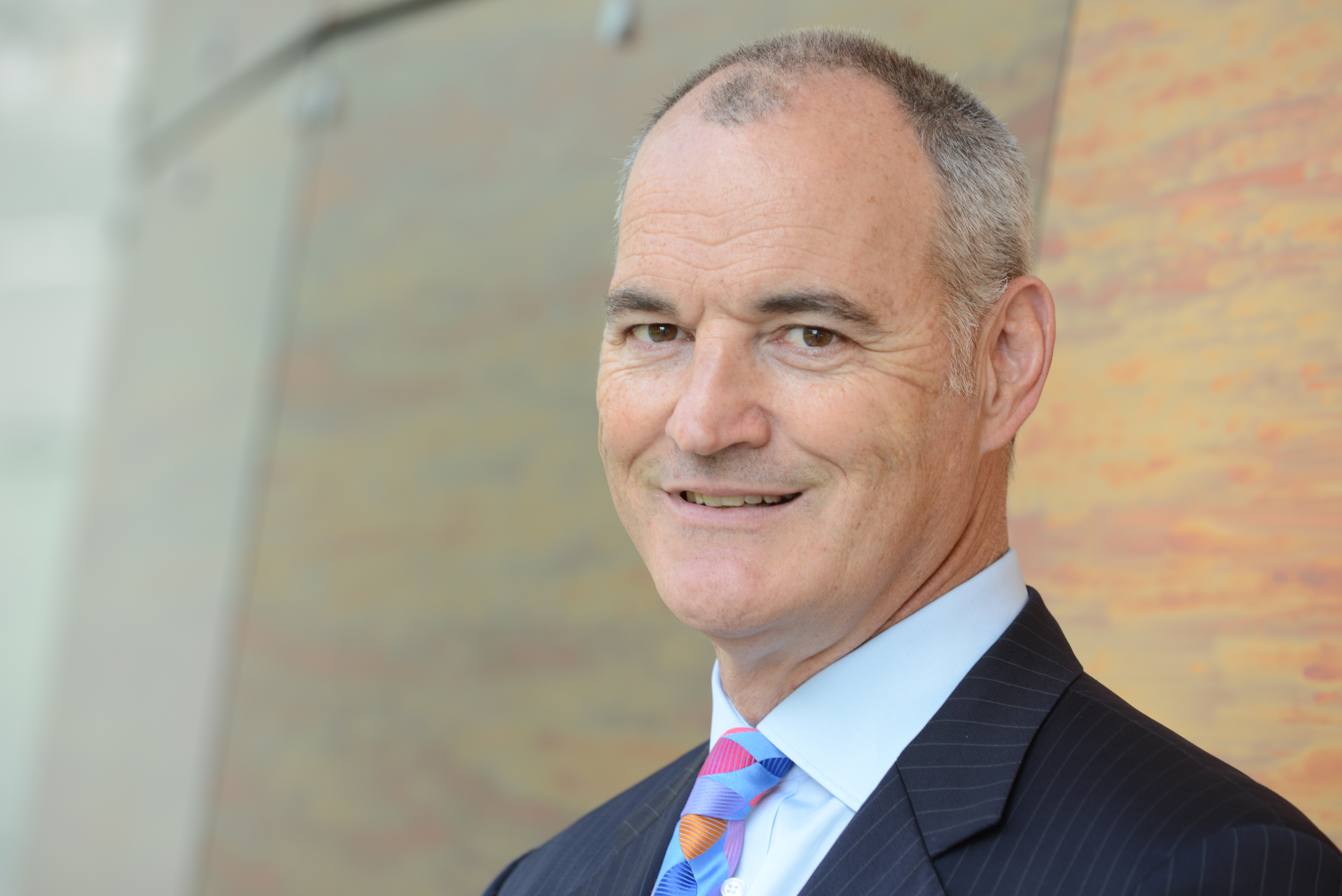
- Cameron in September 2016

Vice-Chancellor and President of the Royal Melbourne Institute of Technology
- Incumbent
- Assumed office January 2022
- Chancellor: Peggy O'Neal
- Preceded by: Martin Bean

Personal details
- Born: 5 February 1963 (age 63) Australia
- Education: University of Sydney (BSc); University of Oxford (PhD)

Alexander (Alec) John Cameron (born 5 February 1963) is an Australian engineer and university administrator, currently serving as Vice-Chancellor and President of RMIT University.

== Early life and education ==
Cameron was educated at Knox Grammar School (1969–1980) where he was school captain in Year 12.

He attended the University of Sydney in 1981–1985, where he graduated with a Bachelor of Science degree in Pure Mathematics and Physics in 1984, and a Bachelor of Engineering degree with First Class Honours and the University Medal in 1986.

While at Sydney University he played in the breakaway (flanker) position in the university club's first grade rugby union XV.

He was selected as the Rhodes scholar for New South Wales in 1986. At the University of Oxford, he was a member of University College, and obtained his DPhil in the Robotics Research Group in 1989, under the supervision of Hugh Durrant-Whyte. He was a member of Oxford University Rugby Football Club and won a Blue in Rugby in 1988.

== Career ==
Cameron joined Philips Research Laboratories in Briarcliff Manor, New York, as a Senior Member of Research Staff from 1989 to 1993.

He then returned to Sydney in 1993 as the founding Program Director of the Australian Graduate School of Engineering Innovation; an Advanced Engineering Centre, jointly established by the University of Sydney and the University of Technology, Sydney.

Cameron then joined Telstra Corporation, holding several senior roles from 1996 to 2000. He then held other positions in the IT sector, with Comindico, Alcatel and Sun Microsystems.

In 2003, he joined the University of New South Wales as Deputy Vice-Chancellor (Resource and Infrastructure). In 2006, he led a review of the Faculty of Commerce and Economics and the Australian Graduate School of Management, leading to a recommendation for their merger, He was appointed as the inaugural dean to achieve this merger and lead the newly created UNSW Business School, holding this position until December 2012. He was president of the Australian Business Deans' Council from 2014 to 2015.

Cameron commenced as Deputy Vice-Chancellor (Education) at the University of Western Australia, in January 2013. In 2015, he attended the Advanced Management Program at Harvard Business School.

He commenced as Vice-Chancellor and Chief Executive at Aston University in September 2016. In 2018, he was one of 5 candidates for The Guardian University Award for the Most Inspiring Leader. Cameron has held several Board positions in association with his role at Aston including:

- Board member of Midlands Innovation and chair from 2019 to 2021.
- Board member of Universities West Midlands and chair from 2017 to 2019.
- Board member of Midlands Engine from 2019 to 2021.
- Board member of the Greater Birmingham and Solihull Local Enterprise Partnership 2019–2021.

He commenced as Vice-Chancellor and President of RMIT University in January 2022, replacing Martin Bean. Professor Aleks Subic succeeded Cameron as Vice-Chancellor of Aston University in August 2022.

Cameron was elected a Fellow of the Australian Academy of Technological Sciences & Engineering in 2026.

== Personal life ==
Cameron married Elizabeth Jane Kellaway in Sydney on 18 July 1987. They have a daughter (Molly) and son (Hugh).

== Publications ==
- Cameron, Alec; Durrant-Whyte, Hugh (October 1990). "A Bayesian Approach to Optimal Sensor Placement". The International Journal of Robotics Research. 9 (5): 70–88. doi:10.1177/027836499000900505. S2CID 5305762.

Academic offices
Preceded by Martin Bean	Vice-Chancellor of RMIT University; 2022–	Incumbent
Preceded by Julia King	Vice-Chancellor of Aston University; 2016–2022	Succeeded by Aleks Subic
