= NBN Co =

Australian government-owned broadband network provider

NBN Co Limited
- Type: Federal Government Enterprise
- Industry: Telecommunications
- Founded: 9 April 2009
- Headquarters: Melbourne, Australia
- Key people: Ellie Sweeney, CEO; Kate McKenzie, chair and non-executive director
- Services: Wholesale data network
- Revenue: A$5.5 billion (2024)
- Operating income: A$141 million (2024)
- Net income: A$-1.2 billion (2024)
- Total assets: A$380.77 billion (2024)
- Total equity: $-3.76 billion (2024)
- Owner: Australian Federal Government
- Members: 8.61 million (2024)
- Number of employees: 4,354 (2024)
- Website: nbnco.com.au

NBN Co Limited, known simply as nbn, is a federal government-owned enterprise of Australia, tasked to design, build and operate Australia's National Broadband Network (NBN) as the nation's wholesale broadband provider. NBN Co reports to two individuals: the Minister for Finance and the Minister for Communications.

== History ==
NBN Co was established on 9 April 2009 under the name of its company number, "ACN 136 533 741 Limited". After the establishment, the Australian Government started referring to the company as "National Broadband Network Company", which became the de facto company name. It was officially named "NBN Co Limited" on 6 October 2009. It traded as "NBN Co" until 26 April 2015 when it began trading simply as "nbn".

NBN Co developed a satellite internet program named Sky Muster aimed at rural areas. As of July 2023, over $620 million had been invested. However, the program experienced fierce competition from Starlink satellites. Sky Muster consists of two geosynchronous satellites orbiting over 35,000 km above Earth's surface, resulting in latency times around 600 milliseconds (at 25 Mbps), compared to Starlink's latency of below 40 milliseconds (for 100-200 Mbps).

In February 2017, CEO Bill Morrow stated that there is no significant demand for wired connections above 25 Mbit/s and consideration of upgrading the network will not be undertaken until demand for high-bandwidth services is proven.

In 2019, NBN Co announced that by May 2020 retail service providers would be able to pool all their connectivity virtual circuit (CVC) bandwidth nationally.

In August 2019, CEO Stephen Rue announced the completion of the $51 billion National Broadband Network by June 2020. However, some service areas were still being rolled out in 2020 and 2021 with FTTP for properties with FTTN or FTTC.

On 6 May 2024, CEO Stephen Rue announced his departure from the company to take the CEO position at Optus. As of 3 December 2024, Ellie Sweeney, former CEO of Vocus, is the new CEO of NBN Co.

In January 2025, the company announced that over 8.6 million homes and businesses were connected to a plan over the nbn access network – compared with 6.7 million in February 2020.

In September 2025, NBN Co introduced wholesale speed enhancements across its Fibre-to-the-Premises (FTTP) and Hybrid Fibre-Coaxial (HFC) networks, upgrading the 100/20 Mbps tier to 500/50 Mbps, the 250/25 Mbps tier to 750/50 Mbps, and increasing the upload capability of the 1000/50 Mbps tier to 100 Mbps. NBN Co also launched a new “Hyperfast” wholesale tier offering up to 2000/200 Mbps on FTTP and 2000/100 Mbps on HFC.

== NBN and retail service providers ==
The NBN network, as of 2022, draws together wired communication (copper, optical and hybrid fibre-coaxial) and radio communication (satellite and fixed wireless networks) at 121 points of interconnect typically located in Telstra owned telephone exchanges throughout Australia. NBN Co also sells access for mobile telecommunication backhaul to mobile telecommunications providers.

As of 30 June 2016, Telstra had 45.5%, TPG group had 24.8% and Optus had 12.4% of all end users connecting to the NBN.

There has been a significant failure of the nbn to deliver nominal performance to end users. There has been contention between Retail Service Providers RSPs and NBN on the reasons for this. Bill Morrow, then CEO of NBN Co, admitted in 2017 that 15% of end users received a poor service through the NBN and were 'seriously dissatisfied'. In addition, Morrow indicated that, at July 2017, prices and performance for end users were suppressed through a 'price war' between RSPs.

=== Contractual arrangements ===
NBN Co contracts mainly with RSPs to provide wholesale broadband access, with limited supply of backhaul to other organisations (for example providing backhaul services to Vodafone).
