= The Kids Research Institute Australia =

Australian children's health research centre

- Established: 1990; 36 years ago
- Mission: Medical research
- Director: Caroline Homer
- Faculty: University of Western Australia
- Adjunct faculty: Perth Children's Hospital
- Key people: Fiona Stanley AC, FAA
- Formerly called: Telethon Institute for Child Health Research, Telethon Kids Institute
- Location: Nedlands, Perth, Western Australia, Australian
- Website: www.thekids.org.au

The Kids Research Institute Australia (until 2024 known as Telethon Kids Institute) is an Australian medical research institute focused on the prevention of paediatric disease and the development of improved treatments to improve the health and wellbeing of children. The Kids has developed a particular focus on Aboriginal health and has more than 500 staff, post-graduate students and visiting scholars. The Kids is located in the Perth suburb of Nedlands, in the Perth Children's Hospital building. The Kids Research Institute Australia is an independent not-for-profit, non-government organisation with close affiliations with the University of Western Australia and the Perth Children's Hospital.

Established in 1990 by Professor Fiona Stanley AC, FAA, the Executive Director of the institute since July 2026 is Professor Caroline Homer AO. Stanley presently holds the role of Patron.

== Research ==
Research at The Kids Research Institute Australia is grouped around four major research focus areas:

- Aboriginal Health
- Brain & Behaviour
- Chronic Diseases of Childhood
- Early Environment

Since its establishment in 1990, researchers at the Institute have published more than 2600 scientific papers and advocated on behalf of children and families.

Some highlights include:

- Discovering that folate can prevent spina bifida;
- Hib meningitis vaccination;
- Improving outcomes for Aboriginal babies and children;
- Researching IVF outcomes;
- Leading the world in the understanding, treatment and prevention of asthma;
- Developing programs to reduce youth suicide;
- Determining causes for cerebral palsy;
- Improving the life chances for children with cystic fibrosis;
- Increasing survival rates for children with leukaemia.

The institute is a research hub for prominent scientists such as Patrick Holt, as well as the home of one of the largest longitudinal cohort studies, the Raine Study, which has been following the lives of thousands of children for more than 20 years.

== Location ==
The Kids Research Institute Australia is co-located with the Perth Children's Hospital within the Queen Elizabeth II Medical Centre site in Nedlands, Western Australia, with which it collaborates closely. The new building is adjacent to the Sir Charles Gairdner Hospital. The institute moved in 2018 after the closure of the Princess Margaret Hospital for Children, and moved to the current site to continue to enhance collaboration with researchers and other clinicians located at the new site.

Ongoing collaborations exist with the University of Western Australia (UWA) Department of Paediatrics, Curtin University and the Channel Seven Perth Telethon, a major funding partner.

== History ==
Formed in 1990 on the grounds of Princess Margaret Hospital (old nurses quarters) when Professor Fiona Stanley and a group of population scientists (epidemiologists) from UWA joined a group of lab based researchers from the hospital and formed the WA Research Institute for Child Health (WARICH). By 1994, due to rapid success and expansion, it became clear that a purpose-built facility was required. A$11.2 million was raised from West Australian corporates and individuals through a capital campaign (where money was pledged over a 5-year period) with the state and federal governments then matching this with A$11.2 million each. The land was purchased from Perth Modern School, construction began in 1998, and the building was opened in February 2000. The original A$11.2 million raised through the capital campaign was invested in a capital account which earns interest to maintain infrastructure.

Channel 7's Telethon was the biggest single donor to the capital campaign (A$5 million over 5 years) and in recognition of this, the name was changed to the Telethon Institute for Child Health Research.

In 2024, the institute underwent a rebrand changing its name from Telethon Kids Institute to The Kids Research Institute Australia (or The Kids for short).

== 2016 immunisation seminar ==
In May 2016 the Telethon Kids Institute held an informational immunisation seminar in Perth. Anti-vaccination activists reportedly hijacked the event, "abusing researchers and branding them liars" and forcing the event to close early. An editorial in The West Australian called it an "ugly disruption" and said that "those who oppose vaccination programs, especially through the use of the tactics displayed on Monday, should examine their consciences".

== See also ==
- Health in Australia
