= SCGH =

SCGH May refer to:

- Sir Charles Gairdner Hospital, a teaching hospital in Nedlands, Perth, Western Australia
- SCGH, the ICAO airport code for Cholguahue Airport, Biobío Region, Chile
