= Thomas Street, Perth =

Road in Subiaco and West Perth, Western Australia

Thomas Street Western Australia

General information
- Type: Road
- Length: 3.3 km (2.1 mi)
- Route number(s): State Route 61 (all sections); State Route 65 westbound (West Perth)
- Tourist routes: Tourist Drive 200 (Kings Park)

Major junctions
- Southwest end: Winthrop Avenue (State Route 61 / Tourist Drive 200), Shenton Park
- Rokeby Road (State Route 64); Kings Park Road (Tourist Drive 200); Hay Street (State Route 65); Roberts Road (State Route 65); Wellington Street (State Route 65)
- Northeast end: Loftus Street (State Route 61), West Leederville

Location(s)
- Major suburbs: Subiaco, West Perth

Thomas Street is a major northeast-southwest road in the Perth suburbs of Subiaco and West Perth, connecting Winthrop Avenue with Loftus Street. These roads, together with London Street further north, form State Route 61, which links Crawley with West Perth and Yokine.

== History ==
The road is named after James Thomas, the Director of Public Works 1876 to 1884.

A railway station, to be located at the corner of Thomas Street and Subiaco Road, was proposed in 1892. There were mixed responses from the public, but the construction costs would have been too expansive due to the steep grade. An alternative site was selected nearby, at Kimberley Street. West Leederville railway station opened there on 12 July 1897.

In 1939, there were calls for the road to be rebuilt and upgraded to dual carriageway standard in the vicinity of Kings Park. In 1940, a plan for construction of the second carriageway was announced by the King's Park Board, the Perth City Council and the Subiaco Municipal Council. The councils would be jointly responsible for the building of the road, with the King's Park Board responsible for the clearing of vegetation. The resumption of a strip of land along the edge of the park needed for the works was approved by an Act of Parliament.

== Route description ==
Thomas Street's southern terminus is a traffic light controlled intersection with Winthrop Avenue and Aberdare Road in Shenton Park, at the north-eastern corner of the Queen Elizabeth II Medical Centre, where Sir Charles Gairdner Hospital is located. The road follows the edge of Kings Park for 2.1 kilometres (1.3 mi) as a six lane dual carriageway, heading in a north-easterly direction to West Perth. North of Kings Park, Thomas Street narrows to a four lane single carriage, with a narrow median strip. It forms the boundary between Subiaco to the west and West Perth to the east of the road. After 600 metres (2,000 ft), the street passes by Princess Margaret Hospital, located between Hay Street and Roberts Road. This section is also part of State Route 65 westbound. The road's northern terminus is situated 600 metres (2,000 ft) further northeast, at its intersection with Loftus Street and Railway Parade. The major intersections along the road are controlled by traffic lights, with the exception of Murray Street.

== Major intersections ==
All intersections listed are controlled by traffic lights unless otherwise indicated.

LGA	Location	km	mi	Destinations	Notes
Cambridge–Perth–Subiaco tripoint	West Leederville–West Perth–Subiaco tripoint	0	0.0	Railway Parade westbound / Railway Street eastbound – Subiaco, Wembley, Northbridge	Northern terminus. Continues as Loftus Street (State Route 61) northbound.
Perth–Subiaco boundary	West Perth–Subiaco boundary	0.3	0.19	Roberts Road westbound / Wellington Street eastbound (State Route 65) – Perth, East Perth	Roberts Road one-way eastbound, no movements permitted from either Thomas or Wellington Street.
Perth–Subiaco boundary	West Perth–Subiaco boundary	0.5	0.31	Murray Street – Perth, East Perth	Unsignalised intersection, Murray Street one-way eastbound.
Perth–Subiaco boundary	West Perth–Subiaco boundary	0.6	0.37	Hay Street (State Route 65) – Subiaco, Floreat, Mount Claremont	Hay Street one-way westbound.
Perth–Subiaco boundary	West Perth–Kings Park–Subiaco tripoint	1.1	0.68	Bagot Road westbound / Kings Park Road eastbound (Tourist Drive 200) – Subiaco, Perth	Tourist Drive 200 northern concurrency terminus. No right turn from Thomas Street southbound to Bagot Road or Bagot Road to Thomas Street southbound.
Perth–Nedlands boundary	Kings Park–Shenton Park boundary	2.4	1.5	Rokeby Road (State Route 64) northbound / Saw Avenue southbound – Subiaco	
Perth–Nedlands boundary	Kings Park–Nedlands–Shenton Park tripoint	3.3	2.1	Aberdare Road west – Karrakatta, Queen Elizabeth II Medical Centre	Southern terminus. Continues as Winthrop Avenue (State Route 61, Tourist Drive 200) southbound.
1.000 mi = 1.609 km; 1.000 km = 0.621 mi: Concurrency terminus; Incomplete access; Note: Intersections with minor local roads are not shown
