= The Kids' Bridge =

Footbridge in Perth, Western Australia

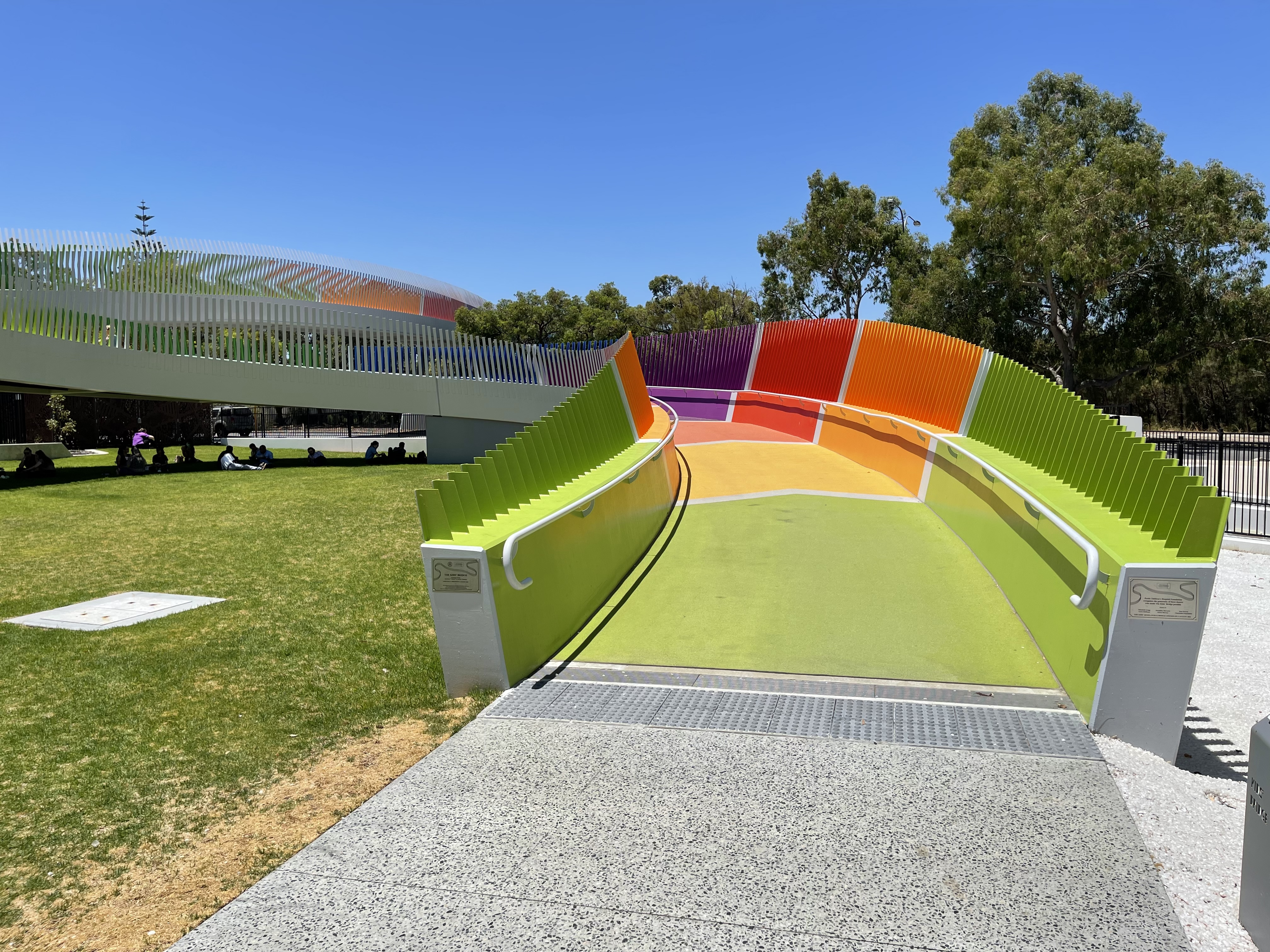
- Coordinates: 31°58′04″S 115°49′04″E
- Carries: Pedestrians
- Crosses: Winthrop Avenue
- Locale: Perth
- Owner: Main Roads Western Australia

Characteristics
- Design: Fratelle + BEaM
- Total length: 217 m (712 ft)
- Width: 3 m (10 ft)

History
- Constructed by: Civmec
- Construction cost: $6.3 million
- Opened: 4 August 2021

The Kids' Bridge, dual-named as Koolangka Bridge, (Note: Koolangka means 'children' in the language of the Noongar, the local Aboriginal people.) is a pedestrian bridge in Perth, Western Australia. It crosses Winthrop Avenue in Nedlands, joining the Perth Children's Hospital and the Queen Elizabeth II Medical Centre with Kings Park.

The bridge is 217 metres (712 ft) long, 3 metres (10 ft) wide and rainbow coloured.

== History ==
The bridge was proposed in 2012, as part of the Perth Children's Hospital, but deferred to give priority to completion of the hospital.

Construction commenced in January 2021, with the bridge opening on 4 August 2021.
