= Loftus Street =

Road in Perth, Western Australia

Loftus Street Western Australia

General information
- Type: Road
- Length: 2.3 km (1.4 mi)
- Route number(s): State Route 61

Major junctions
- South end: Thomas Street, (State Route 61), West Leederville
- Graham Farmer Freeway (State Route 8); Vincent Street (State Route 72); Scarborough Beach Road
- North end: London Street, (State Route 61), Mount Hawthorn

Location(s)
- Major suburbs: West Perth, Leederville, North Perth

Loftus Street is a major north–south road in the Perth suburbs of Subiaco and West Perth, connecting London Street with Thomas Street. These roads, together with Winthrop Avenue further south, form State Route 61, which links Crawley with West Perth and Yokine.

== History ==
Loftus Street appears on maps as far back as 1894. In 1926, it was widened to accommodate the increasing number of motorised vehicles.

The section between Vincent Street and Anzac Road was reconstructed in 1927. This route, along with Winthrop Avenue to the south, constitutes State Route 61, facilitating links with key areas such as Subiaco and Crawley. The street's presence dates back to at least 1894, as evidenced by historical maps. In response to the growing number of motor vehicles, Loftus Street underwent widening in 1926. Further reconstruction occurred in 1927 between Vincent Street and Anzac Road to accommodate increasing traffic demands.

In connection with the construction of the Graham Farmer Freeway, Loftus Street was widened to six lanes between Wellington and Vincent streets with the work completed in January 2000.

== Route description ==
Loftus Street's southern terminus is a traffic light controlled intersection with Thomas Street and Railway Parade in West Leederville. The road proceeds north-easterly as a six lane dual carriageway. After 200 metres (660 ft) there is an overpass bridging the Mitchell Freeway, with intersections at each end of the bridge. These are with Graham Farmer Freeway interchange ramps to the east, and Cambridge Street and Leederville Parade to the west. Following its intersection with Vincent Street after 600 metres (2,000 ft), the road turns north with only four lanes It remains as a dual carriage for 300 metres (980 ft), before narrowing to a single carriageway road. Loftus Street reaches its northern terminus 1.1 kilometres (0.68 mi) further north, at its intersection with London Street and Scarborough Beach Road.

There are various community facilities at the corner of Vincent and Loftus Streets, including the City of Vincent's Administration & Civic Centre and public library, the Loftus Recreation Centre, and the Loftus Community Centre.

== Major intersections ==
All intersections listed are controlled by traffic lights unless otherwise indicated.

LGA	Location	km	mi	Destinations	Notes
Vincent	North Perth-Mount Hawthorn boundary	0	0.0	Scarborough Beach Road – Scarborough, Innaloo, North Perth	Northern terminus. Continues as London Street (State Route 61) northbound.
Vincent	North Perth–Leederville boundary	0.9	0.56	Bourke Street	
Vincent	North Perth–West Perth-Leederville tripoint	1.4	0.87	Vincent Street (State Route 72) – City Beach, Wembley, Mount Lawley	
Vincent	West Perth-Leederville boundary	1.7	1.1	Newcastle Street	No right turn permitted from Loftus south to Newcastle west
Vincent-Perth boundary	West Perth-West Leederville-Leederville tripoint	1.9	1.2	Leederville Parade westbound / Graham Farmer Freeway eastbound (Tourist Drive 8) – East Perth, Welshpool, Kalamunda	Freeway eastbound entrance only.
Vincent-Perth boundary	West Perth-West Leederville-Leederville tripoint	2.1	1.3	Cambridge Street westbound / Graham Farmer Freeway eastbound (Tourist Drive 8) – City Beach, Floreat, Wembley	Freeway westbound exit only.
Cambridge–Perth–Subiaco tripoint	West Leederville–West Perth–Subiaco tripoint	2.3	1.4	Railway Parade westbound / Railway Street eastbound – Subiaco, Wembley, Northbridge	Southern terminus. Continues as Thomas Street (State Route 61) southbound.
1.000 mi = 1.609 km; 1.000 km = 0.621 mi: Incomplete access; Note: Intersections with minor local roads are not shown
