= Arafura-class patrol vessel =

Class of patrol vessel

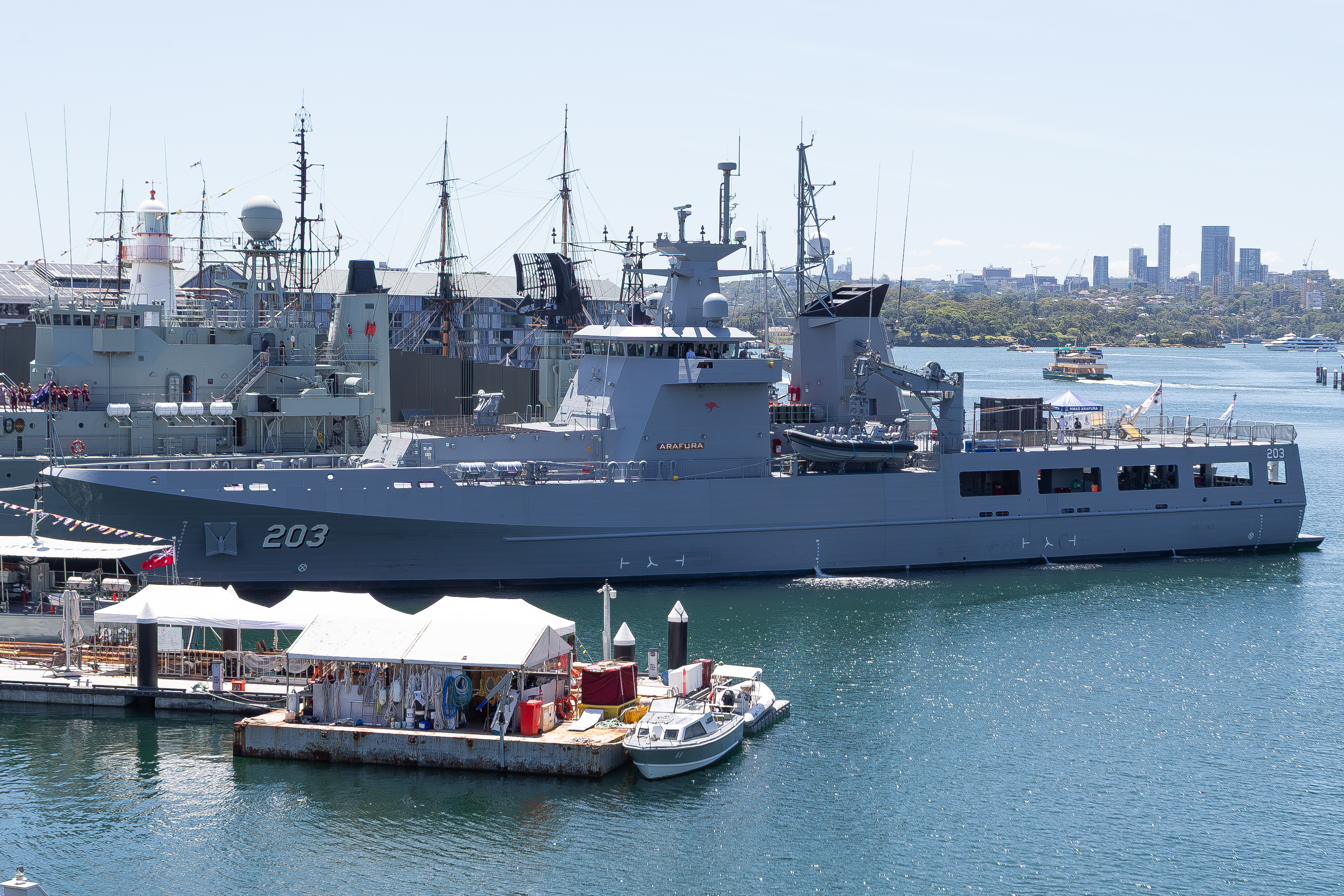
- HMAS Arafura moored next to HMAS Vampire at the Australian National Maritime Museum

Class overview
- Name: Arafura class
- Builders: Lürssen (designer); BAE Systems (2 ships); Civmec (4 ships)
- Operators: Royal Australian Navy
- Preceded by: Armidale-class patrol boat
- Cost: A$3.6 billion (2018) (equivalent to A$4 billion in 2022) for 12 vessels; A$300 million (2018) (equivalent to A$337 million in 2022) per unit
- Built: November 2018 – present
- In commission: June 2025 – present
- Planned: 12
- Building: 4
- Completed: 2
- Canceled: 6
- Active: 2

General characteristics
- Type: Offshore patrol vessel
- Displacement: 1,640 tonnes
- Length: 80 metres
- Beam: 13 metres
- Draught: 4 metres
- Propulsion: 2 x 4,440kW diesel engines
- Speed: 22 knots (41 km/h; 25 mph) (maximum)
- Range: 4,000 nmi (7,400 km)
- Endurance: 21 days
- Boats & landing craft carried: 2 x 8.5m Boomeranger FRB850 RHIBs davit launched; 1 x 10.5m Boomeranger C1100 RHIB stern ramp launched
- Complement: 40
- Sensors & processing systems: SAAB Situational Awareness System (SAS) with: Saab EOS500 electro-optical fire control director, Terma SCANTER 6002 radar, Furuno navigation radars; Safran Vigy Engage electro-optical surveillance and fire control multisensor system
- Armament: 2x .50 calibre machine guns
- Aircraft carried: Unmanned aerial vehicle; light UAV capability to be integrated under Project Sea 129
- Aviation facilities: Utility deck

The Arafura class is a class of offshore patrol vessels being built for the Royal Australian Navy (RAN). Initially proposed in the 2009 Defence White Paper and marked as procurement project SEA 1180, it was originally planned that 20 Offshore Combatant Vessels (OCV) would replace 26 vessels across four separate ship classes: the Armidale-class patrol boats, the Huon-class minehunters, the Leeuwin-class survey vessels, and the Paluma-class survey motor launches. Although having a common design (which could be up to 2,000 tonnes in displacement), the ships would use a modular mission payload system to fulfill specific roles; primarily border patrol, mine warfare, and hydrographic survey. The 2013 Defence White Paper committed to the OCV project as a long-term goal, but opted in the short term for an accelerated procurement of an existing design to replace the Armidales, and life-extension refits for the other types. This resulted in the Offshore Patrol Vessel (OPV) project and the number of vessels reduced to 12. However, this was further increased to 14 when 2 further Mine Counter Measures variants were proposed under SEA 1905.

Prime Minister Malcolm Turnbull announced on 18 April 2016 that ship designers Damen, Fassmer and Lürssen had been shortlisted for the project. On 24 November 2017, the government announced that Lürssen had been selected.

== Offshore combatant proposal ==
=== Planning and design ===
First made public in Defending Australia in the Asia Pacific Century: Force 2030, the 2009 Department of Defence white paper, the planned vessels stem from Government instructions for the RAN to rationalise patrol, mine warfare, and hydrographic survey assets into a single class of warship. It was originally planned 20 OCVs would replace 26 vessels across four separate ship classes: the Armidale-class patrol boats, the Huon-class minehunters, the Leeuwin-class survey vessels, and the Paluma-class survey motor launches.

Instead of being capable of performing all roles simultaneously, the ships have a modular mission payload system like the Standard Flex system used by the Danish Navy, or the system used by the United States Navy's littoral combat ships: mission-specific equipment will be fitted to containerised modules, which can be exchanged for different modules when the ship needs to change roles. The use of containerised modules means that equipment can be upgraded without taking the ships out of service for refit, and if necessary can be fitted to requisitioned civilian vessels. The cost in developing and implementing the modular system is predicted to be offset by the savings in the areas of maintenance (having to purchase and maintain stocks to repair four different designs), personnel (having to retrain sailors when they transfer to a new ship), and administration.

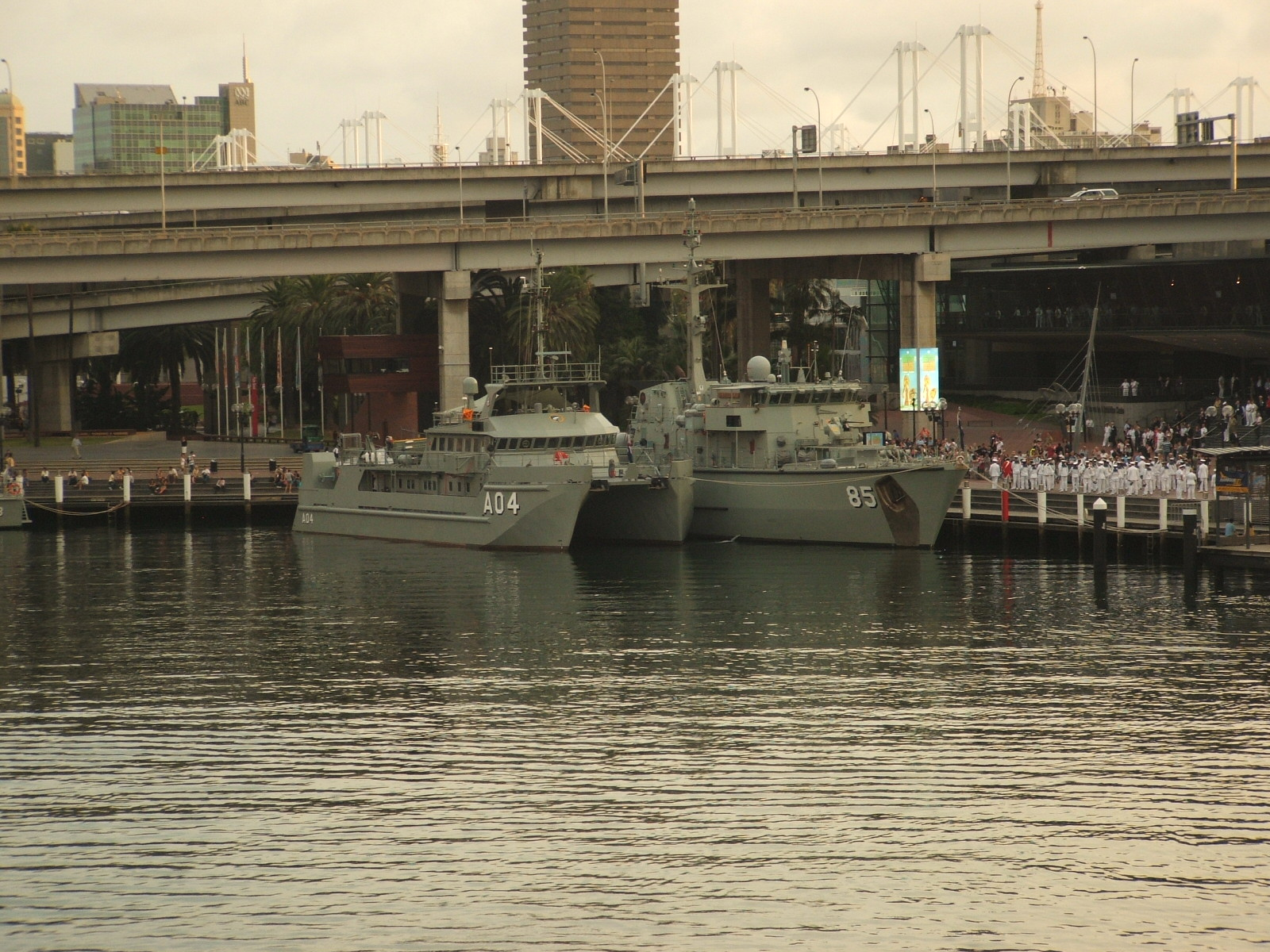
The Paluma-class survey motor launch HMAS Benalla (left) and the Huon-class minehunter HMAS Gascoyne: two of the four ship classes were to be replaced by the Offshore Combatant Vessel

It was anticipated that the new ships could have displaced anywhere up to 2,000 tonnes, although defence magazine editor Kym Bergmann predicts that this 'worst case' would require 50,000 tons of steel or aluminium to be fabricated (compared to 36,000 tons for the Attack-class submarine program), and unless multiple shipbuilders are involved, the 12- to 18-month construction time per vessel will see the last ship enter service during the late 2020s.

Instead of building all 20 vessels to the same design, the idea of hull variants optimised for different roles is also being explored: the module system will allow a ship designed for one role to be rapidly reconfigured to serve in another role, with a small but acceptable loss in capability compared to a 'native' OPV. The OPVs could be designed to carry a helicopter or an unmanned aerial vehicle to improve each ship's surveillance range, but this avenue is dependent on further study and cost-benefit analysis.

The OPV was originally planned to replace 26 vessels across four warship classes: the Armidale-class patrol boats, the Huon-class minehunters, the Leeuwin-class survey vessels, and the Paluma-class survey motor launches. The new ships were to be used for offshore and littoral patrol, border protection, anti-terrorism and anti-piracy operations, mine warfare, and hydrographic survey. It was plausible that the OPVs will operate in support of the Canberra-class landing helicopter dock ships; amphibious operations would benefit from the survey and mine warfare capabilities of the ships.

Another major change, reportedly being examined by the DSR (Australia's Defence Strategic Review), is the possibility of either up-arming or divesting the service's new Arafura-class OPVs, before NUSHIP Arafura has even conducted sea trials. The concern is that the OPVs are not able to contribute to any high-end scenarios, as they lack so much as a large calibre gun. One possibility, being examined, is outfitting the vessels with between four and six Kongsberg Naval Strike Missiles, which the RAN is already procuring. Another approach, which has gained some traction, is the possibility of divesting the fleet to other government agencies (such as the Australian Border Force) and international partners (such as Papua New Guinea), and instead procuring a fleet of missile-armed corvettes.

=== International co-operation ===
The Royal Navy has begun plans for a similar vessel under the Future Surface Combatant program, designated the Future Mine Countermeasures/Hydrographic/Patrol Vessel (FMHPV). At the start of 2010, it was announced that the governments of Australia and the United Kingdom were exploring the potential for idea-sharing and co-operation on the design of the OPV and FMHPV, as well as planned replacements for the Anzac-class, Type 22, and Type 23 frigates. Although the nations will share their analyses, a common design or shared construction program is unlikely, as the two nations have different needs and replacement schedules. The RAN is also observing the development of the United States Navy Littoral Combat Ships, to take advantage of lessons learned during the program.

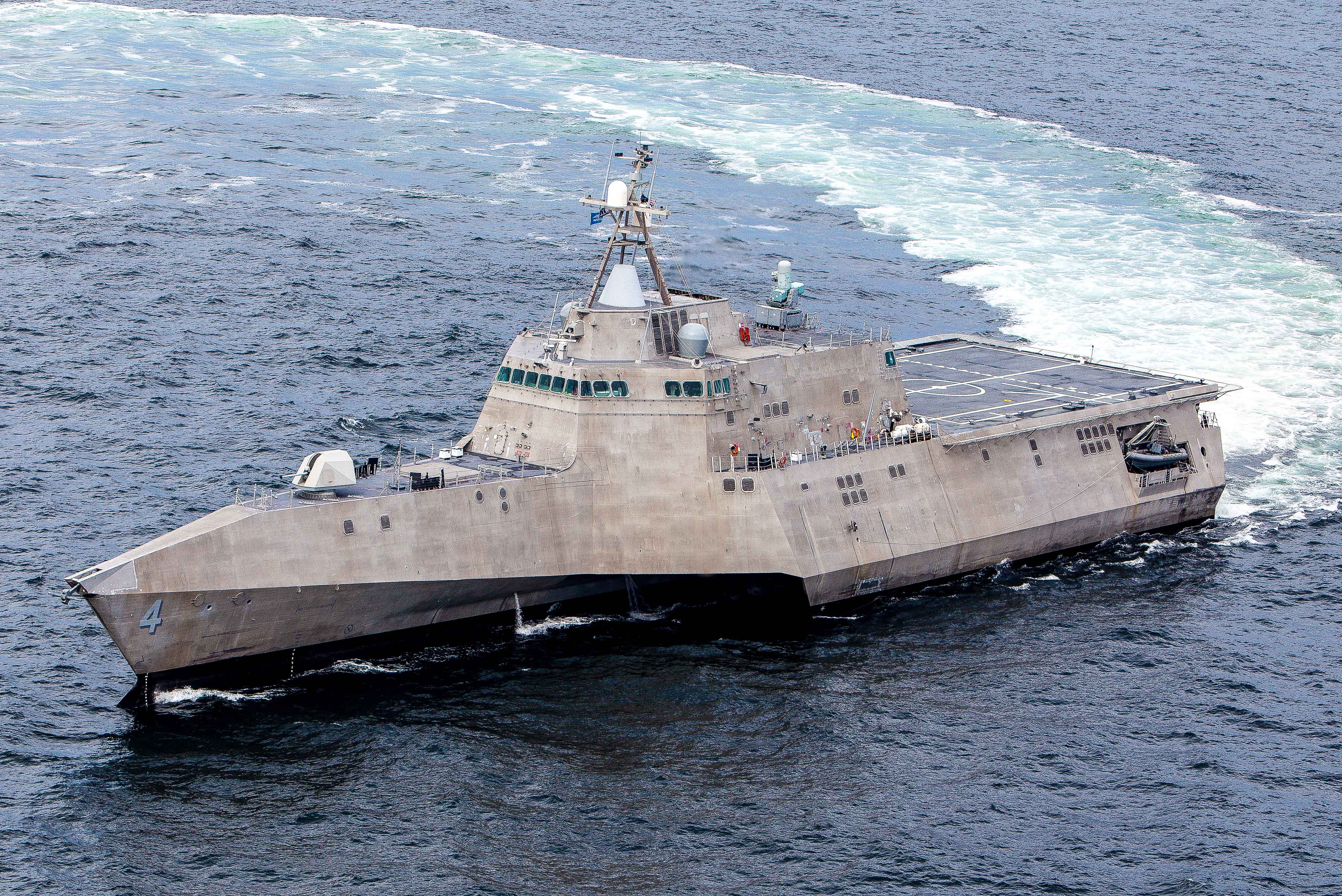
Austal suggested a scaled-down variant of the Independence-class littoral combat ship (USS Coronado pictured) for the Australian OCV project

=== Proposed designs ===
While designing the Independence-class trimarans for the Littoral Combat Ship program, Australian-owned shipbuilder Austal also prepared a scaled-down version that could serve as the basis for the Australian OPV. The Austal Multi Role Vessel (MRV 80) would have an overall length of 80 metres, a top speed of 26 knots, carry an NH-90 or similar helicopter, and have 500 square metres for mission equipment or cargo.

In 2012, American shipbuilder Huntington Ingalls Industries proposed a variant of the Legend-class National Security Cutter, a ship built for the United States Coast Guard.

== Offshore Patrol Vessel program ==
Although the 2013 White Paper committed to the OCV as a long-term plan, it announced that an interim patrol boat class based on an existing design would be acquired as a short-term replacement for the Armidales, while the Palumas and Huons would undergo life-extension upgrades. The 20 vessels originally planned to be built was reduced was later reduced to 12 following the change in their planned role. The project received the procurement designation SEA 1180.

Prime Minister Malcolm Turnbull announced on 18 April 2016 that ship designers Damen, Fassmer and Lürssen had been shortlisted for the project. On 24 November 2017, the government announced that Lürssen had been selected.

In October 2017, the Australian government announced that the vessels would use an Australian-designed SAAB tactical combat management system.

Under SEA 1905 a further two ships are to be built by Civmec for the mine countermeasures role. A third vessel may be procured under SEA 2400 to fulfill the survey role although this is unlikely. This was expanded in the 2020 Defence Strategic Update and 2020 Force Structure Plan released on 30 June 2020 for up to 8 vessels optimised for mine countermeasures and hydrographic survey roles potentially based on the Arafura design, possibly bringing the total number of vessels back up to the original 20.

=== Design ===
The Arafura-class is based on the Lürssen-designed Darussalam-class, operated by the Royal Brunei Navy. Each vessel has a gross displacement of 1,640 tonnes, and measures 80 metres long, with a beam of 13 metres and a draft of 4 metres. Propulsion power is from two MTU 16V diesel engines rated at 4440 kW each, which drive variable pitch propellers and give a top speed of 22 knots, shipboard electrical power is generated by MAN diesel engines. The ship's range is about 4,000 nautical miles (7,400 km), with an endurance of 21 days. The standard crew complement is 40 sailors, though up to 20 more can be berthed if required. The ships will be deployed with empty space available to install container-mounted systems such as aircraft support and sensors; if fully utilized, the gross displacement could increase to 1,800 tonnes.

Shipboard armament was originally intended to be a single 40 mm gun and two 12.7 mm guns. The 40 mm gun was cancelled in 2021 due to a combination of technical problems and a re-assessment of the threats the ships would face. The ships will instead be armed with a Typhoon Weapon Station on an interim basis until a replacement weapon is identified and then acquired. In May 2023, it was reported that the RAN was considering purchasing a containerised variant of the C-Dome surface-to-air missile system to improve the Arafura-class's armament. In 2024, the Department of Defence decided the class would not have a main gun and changed the operational role of the class. The RAN directed that work on the interim Typhoon Weapon Station cease.

Each vessel carries two 8.5 metre rigid inflatable boats and a single 10 metre boat, which are intended as the primary means of deploying offensive force in the ships' border patrol role. A single unmanned aerial vehicle is carried and deployed from an open utility deck. Two separate electro-optic targeting systems and three radars are installed and managed by the Saab 9LV system. In order to allow the ships to operate in conjunction with allied international forces, each ship is equipped with a unique electronic identifier transponder that allows for communication via the Link 16 network.

According to the Department of the Defence, while the flight deck will not land helicopters, it can carry weights of up to 11 tonnes.

== Construction ==
The class of ships will be based on Lürssen's OPV80, similar to the Darussalam-class offshore patrol vessel of the Royal Brunei Navy. The first two vessels were built by BAE Systems in Adelaide, South Australia before production is transferred to the shipyard of Forgacs Marine & Defence, a subsidiary of Civmec, in Henderson, Western Australia.

Construction of the first ship began on 15 November 2018. On that day, it was also announced that the vessel would be named Arafura, and the class the Arafura-class patrol vessels.

On 9 April 2020 the second ship in the class, HMAS Eyre, was laid down at ASC's shipyard. The names of the following four ships were also announced at this time: HMA Ships Pilbara, Gippsland, Illawarra and Carpentaria.

The first three ships amongst the then new names, HMAS Pilbara, HMAS Gippsland, HMAS Illawarra and HMAS Carpentaria were laid down at the shipyard of Civmec in Henderson on 11 September 2020, 30 July 2021, 27 September 2022, and 5 December 2022 respectively.

In October 2022 it was reported that NUSHIP Arafura did not meet civilian safety standards and the Albanese government was concerned that the ships were too lightly armed to meet the Navy's needs. The government was considering reducing the number of ships to be built, with those completed possibly being transferred to the Australian Border Force. The delays to completing the Arafura-class ships led the project to be added to the Defence 'projects of concern' list in April 2023. Arafura was launched on 16 December 2021, but due to structural fire protection design issues, did not commence sea trials until 26 August 2024.

HMAS Eyre was launched on 22 November 2023, sponsored by Natalie Charlesworth. She was commissioned on 30 May 2026.

NUSHIP Pilbara was launched on 31 October 2025.

== Criticism ==
With the cancellation of the main gun and the lack of any other major weaponry, the class has been criticised for being unable to operate in medium to high-end warfighting and resulted in calls to either up-arm the class or transfer the ships to the Australian Border Force Marine Unit in favour of a fleet of corvettes. The class has also faced criticism for schedule delays and being over budget.

== Cancellation ==
Following the Defence Strategic Review 2023 and the Surface Fleet Review by the Albanese Government in February 2024, the final six vessels were cancelled due to the vessels being deemed as an inefficient use of resources for civil maritime security operations and not possessing the survivability and self-defence systems to contribute to a surface combatant mission. Instead, further investigation will be taken to determine how these vessels can contribute to other mission sets.

== Ships ==
Dates in Italics indicate estimates

Name	Pennant number	Builder	Laid down	Launched	Commissioned	Status	Namesake
Arafura	OPV 203	ASC Shipbuilding, Osborne	10 May 2019	16 December 2021	28 June 2025	Active	Arafura Sea
Eyre	OPV 204	ASC Shipbuilding, Osborne	9 April 2020	22 November 2023	30 May 2026	Active	Eyre Peninsula, South Australia
Pilbara	OPV 205	Civmec, Henderson	11 September 2020	31 October 2025	2026	Fitting out	Pilbara, Western Australia
Gippsland	OPV 206	Civmec, Henderson	30 July 2021		2027	Under construction	Gippsland, Victoria
Illawarra	OPV 207	Civmec, Henderson	27 September 2022		2028	Under construction	Illawarra, New South Wales
Carpentaria	OPV 208	Civmec, Henderson	29 August 2025		2029	Under construction	Gulf of Carpentaria
