= Fiona Stanley =

Australian epidemiologist noted for her public health research

Fiona Stanley AC FAA FASSA
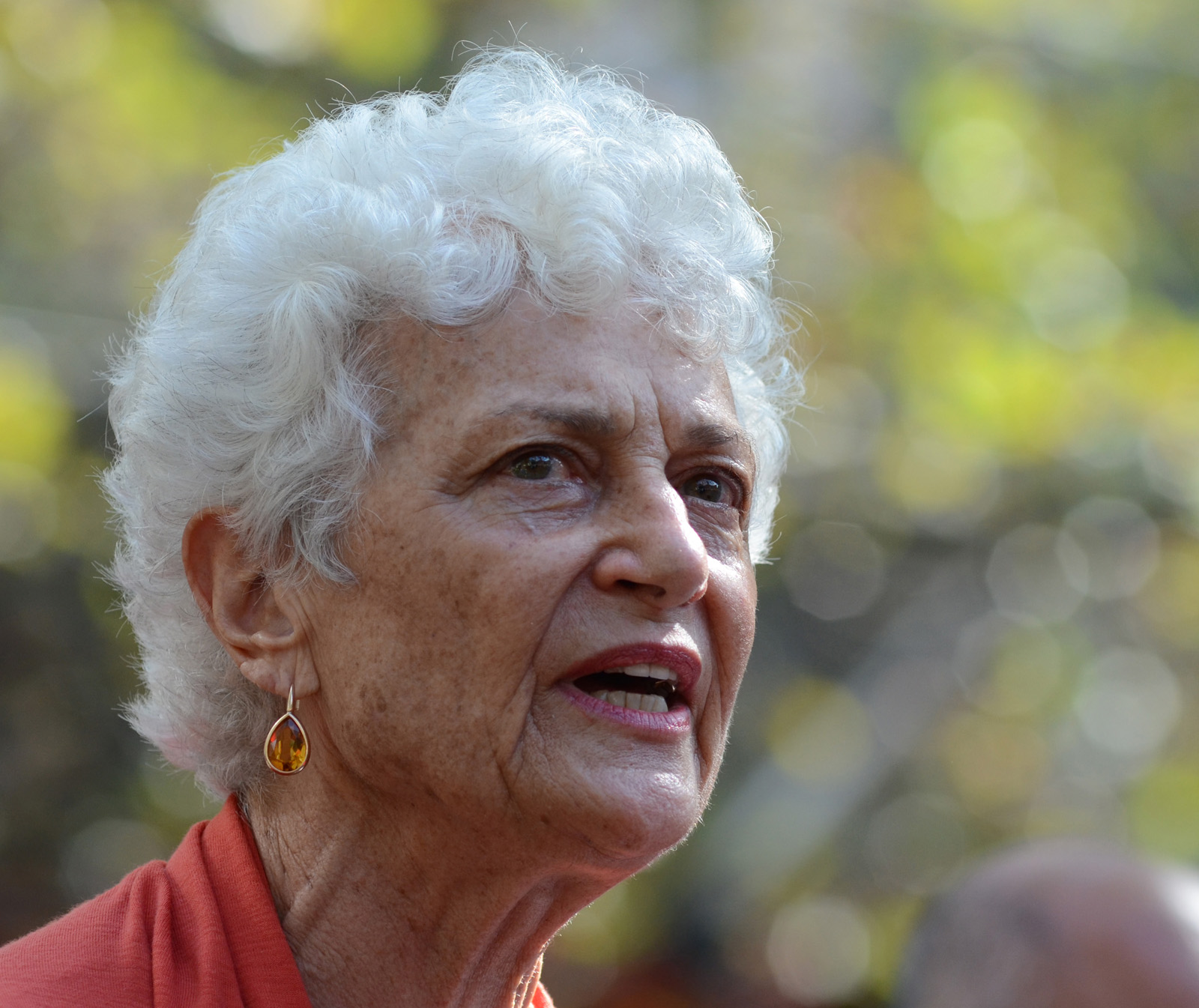
- Stanley at the March for Science in Melbourne 2017
- Born: Fiona Juliet Stanley; 1 August 1946 (age 80); Little Bay, New South Wales, Australia
- Education: St Hilda's Anglican School for Girls
- Alma mater: University of Western Australia; University of London; London School of Hygiene & Tropical Medicine
- Known for: Confirmed the benefit of folate in preventing spina bifida
- Spouse: Geoffrey Shellam
- Awards: Companion of the Order of Australia (1996); Fellow of the Australian Academy of Science (2002); Centenary Medal (2001); Australian of the Year (2003); Australian Living Treasure (2004)
- Scientific career
- Fields: Epidemiology
- Workplaces: Telethon Kids Institute (1990–2011); University of Western Australia

Fiona Juliet Stanley (born 1 August 1946) is an Australian epidemiologist noted for her public health work, her research into child and maternal health as well as disorders that children suffered at birth such as cerebral palsy. Stanley is the patron of the Telethon Kids Institute and a distinguished professorial fellow in the School of Paediatrics and Child Health at the University of Western Australia. From 1990 to December 2011 she was the founding director of Telethon Kids.

== Early life and education ==
Fiona Juliet Stanley was born in Little Bay, New South Wales. She loved reading about people such as Marie Curie and through her father, who was a researcher on polio, she met Jonas Salk. She has said of her childhood that "In my dreams I would sail out to all the undiscovered islands and inoculate the inhabitants in a whirlwind race to conquer disease and pestilence."

In 1956, the family moved to Western Australia when Stanley's father took the Foundation Chair of Microbiology at the University of Western Australia. Stanley attended St Hilda's Anglican School for Girls before studying medicine at the University of Western Australia, graduating in 1970.

== Career ==
Her first job, in the early 1970s, was in a paediatric clinic at Perth's former children's hospital, Princess Margaret Hospital for Children, where her patients included thin and sick Aboriginal children flown in from remote western settlements. She said of this work that "we would perform expensive 'miracles' ... and then dump them back into the environments that had caused their problems". Consequently, she says, she started travelling, with colleagues, to "every mission camp, reserve and fringe-dwelling group in Western Australia ... talking to the old people ... trying to get a handle on the health issues and the environmental issues". She began to understand the impact of life chances and living conditions on children. She also worked at the Australian Aboriginal Clinic in East Perth.

This experience sparked an interest in epidemiology and public health. She spent six years in the United Kingdom, at the Social Medicine Unit at the London School of Hygiene & Tropical Medicine, and the United States researching these areas before returning to Perth to establish research programs at the University and within the health department. She became "Part of the next trend in medicine, the move from a preoccupation with curing disease to a focus on prevention and social causal pathways".

During her career, Stanley has focussed on the importance of using population data to provide significant health, social and economic benefits to the community. In 1977, her research group established the WA Maternal and Child Health Research Database. It is a unique collection of data on births from the entire state which has proved a valuable resource in predicting trends in maternal and child health and the effects of preventive programs. Stanley's research also includes strategies to enhance health and well-being in populations; the causes and prevention of birth defects and major neurological disorders such as cerebral palsy; the causes and lifelong consequences of low birth weight; and patterns of maternal and child health in Aboriginal and Caucasian populations. "Data collected enabled Stanley and her colleagues to explore, for instance, the connection between a lack of folic acid in diets and spina bifida, and markedly reduce it". This work in 1989 confirmed that the benefit of folate in preventing spina bifida, as first shown in double blind clinical trials in the UK (Laurence et al., BMJ 282 1509–1511 (1981)), also applied in Western Australian populations.

In 1990, she became the founding director of the Telethon Kids Institute, in Nedlands, Western Australia. The institute is a multi-disciplinary research facility that investigates the causes and prevention of major childhood diseases and disabilities. Since 1995 it has received major funding from an annual telethon. It also receives federal and state funding, and monies from research foundations, grants and commercial contracts.

In 2002, due largely to her lobbying, the prime minister of Australia, John Howard, launched the Australian Research Alliance for Children and Youth (ARACY) of which she is chairperson. The alliance has offices located in Canberra, Perth and Melbourne and aims to progress collaboration and evidence-based action to improve the wellbeing of young Australians. In her 2003 Kenneth Myer Lecture at the National Library of Australia she talked about "modernity's paradox" in which increasing wealth and opportunity has also resulted in increased social differences and more problems for children and youth, including increases in asthma, obesity, diabetes, child abuse, binge-drinking, drug abuse and mental health problems. She argued for cross-disciplinary work and said the challenge is "to intervene earlier in the causal cycles".

Stanley is a professor at the School of Paediatrics and Child Health at University of Western Australia and the UNICEF Australian ambassador for Early Childhood Development. She was named Australian of the Year in 2003. In 2011 she was appointed to the board of the Australian Broadcasting Corporation by communications minister Stephen Conroy. Phase one of the hospital, the Fiona Stanley Hospital named in her honour, officially opened on 3 October 2014.

== Awards, honours and other recognition ==
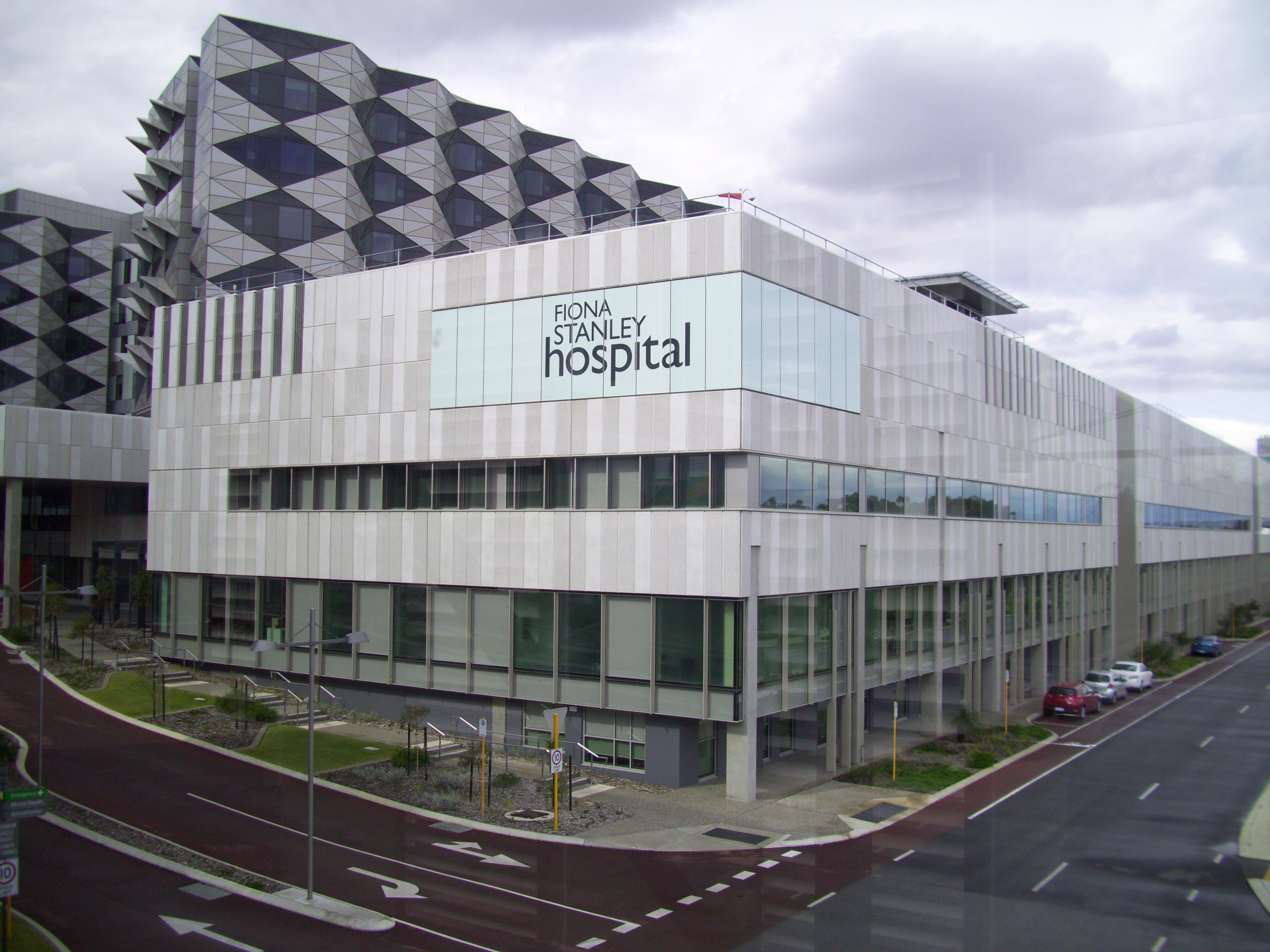
Part of the Fiona Stanley Hospital

- 1996: Companion of the Order of Australia (AC), "for service to maternal and child health research, particularly in perinatal and infant problems, and for her contributions to improving aboriginal and community health" in the Queen's Birthday Honours List
- 1996: Elected a fellow of the Academy of the Social Sciences in Australia
- 2001: Centenary Medal
- 2002: Appointed a fellow of the Australian Academy of Science and the subject of an Australian stamp in a series of six stamps showing eminent medical Australian scientists.
- 2003: Australian of the Year
- 2004: the National Trust's Australian Living Treasure.
- 2008: runner in the 2008 Summer Olympics torch relay, in Canberra, Australian Capital Territory, 24 April 2008.

=== Honorary degrees ===
- 1998: Honorary Doctor of Science (Hon DSc), Murdoch University
- 2001: Honorary Doctor of the University (Hon DUniv), Queensland University of Technology
- 2004: Honorary Fellow of the Royal Australian College of General Practitioners (Hon FRACGP)
- 2005: Honorary Doctor of Medicine (Hon MD), University of Sydney
- 2006: Honorary Fellow of the Royal College of Paediatrics and Child Health (UK) (Hon FRCPCH)
- 2008: Honorary Doctor (Hon MD), University of Melbourne
- 2009: Honorary Bragg Member, Royal Institution of Australia
- 2010: Honorary Doctor of Science (Hon DSc), Edith Cowan University
- 2014: Honorary Doctor from KU Leuven for her distinguished contributions to poverty research.
- 2015: Honorary Fellow of the Australian Academy of Health and Medical Sciences.
- 2019: International Honorary Member - American Academy of Arts and Sciences.

== Personal life ==
Stanley married Geoffrey Shellam, who later occupied the same chair of microbiology that her father had occupied.

On 10 October 2023, Stanley was one of 25 Australians of the Year who signed an open letter, initiated by psychiatrist Patrick McGorry, supporting the Yes vote in the Indigenous Voice referendum.

== Bibliography ==
- Giese, Diana (October 2003). "Changing the world [Profile of Fiona Stanley.]". National Library of Australia News. 14 (1): 14–17. ISSN 1035-753X.
