= Winthrop Avenue =

Road in Perth, Western Australia

Winthrop Avenue Western Australia
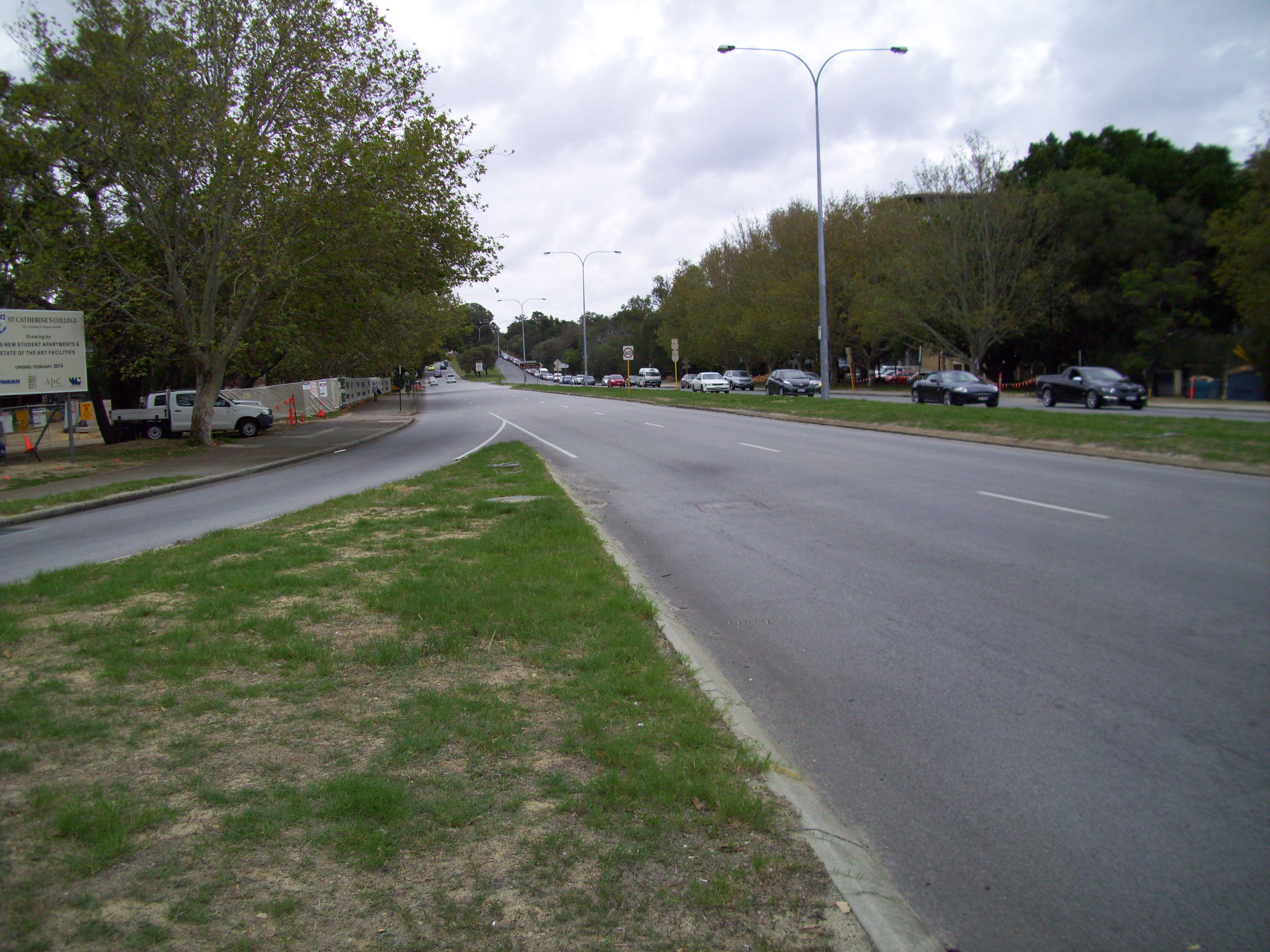
- View north from Stirling Highway

General information
- Type: Road
- Length: 1.2 km (0.7 mi)
- Route number(s): State Route 61
- Tourist routes: Tourist Drive 200 (Kings Park)

Major junctions
- South end: Stirling Highway (State Route 5), Crawley
- North end: Thomas Street (State Route 61 / Tourist Drive 200), Shenton Park

Location(s)
- LGA(s): City of Subiaco
- Major suburbs: Nedlands

Winthrop Avenue is a major north–south road in the Perth suburbs of Nedlands and Crawley. For most of its length, the road travels alongside the south-western edge of Kings Park, connecting Thomas Street with Stirling Highway, Mounts Bay Road, and the University of Western Australia's Crawley campus. It is the southernmost section of State Route 61, which links Crawley with West Perth and Yokine.

== History ==
Winthrop Avenue is named after Sir John Winthrop Hackett, who was a newspaper editor, politician and university chancellor. Originally named Ferdinand Street after Ferdinand von Mueller, it was renamed in 1932 to perpetuate Hackett's legacy. In 1937 improvements to the road were proposed, to make it attractive, and because the road was "bumpy" and "patched". Though it was a boundary road between the Perth City Council and Subiaco Municipal Council, Subiaco were unwilling to pay for half the cost. Winthrop Avenue remained poorly constructed in 1939, with calls for it to be upgraded to dual carriageway standard. In 1940, a plan for construction of the second carriageway was announced by the King's Park Board, the Perth City Council and the Subiaco Municipal Council. The councils would be jointly responsible for the building of the road, with the King's Park Board responsible for the clearing of vegetation. The resumption of a strip of land along the edge of the park needed for the works was approved by an Act of Parliament.

== Route description ==
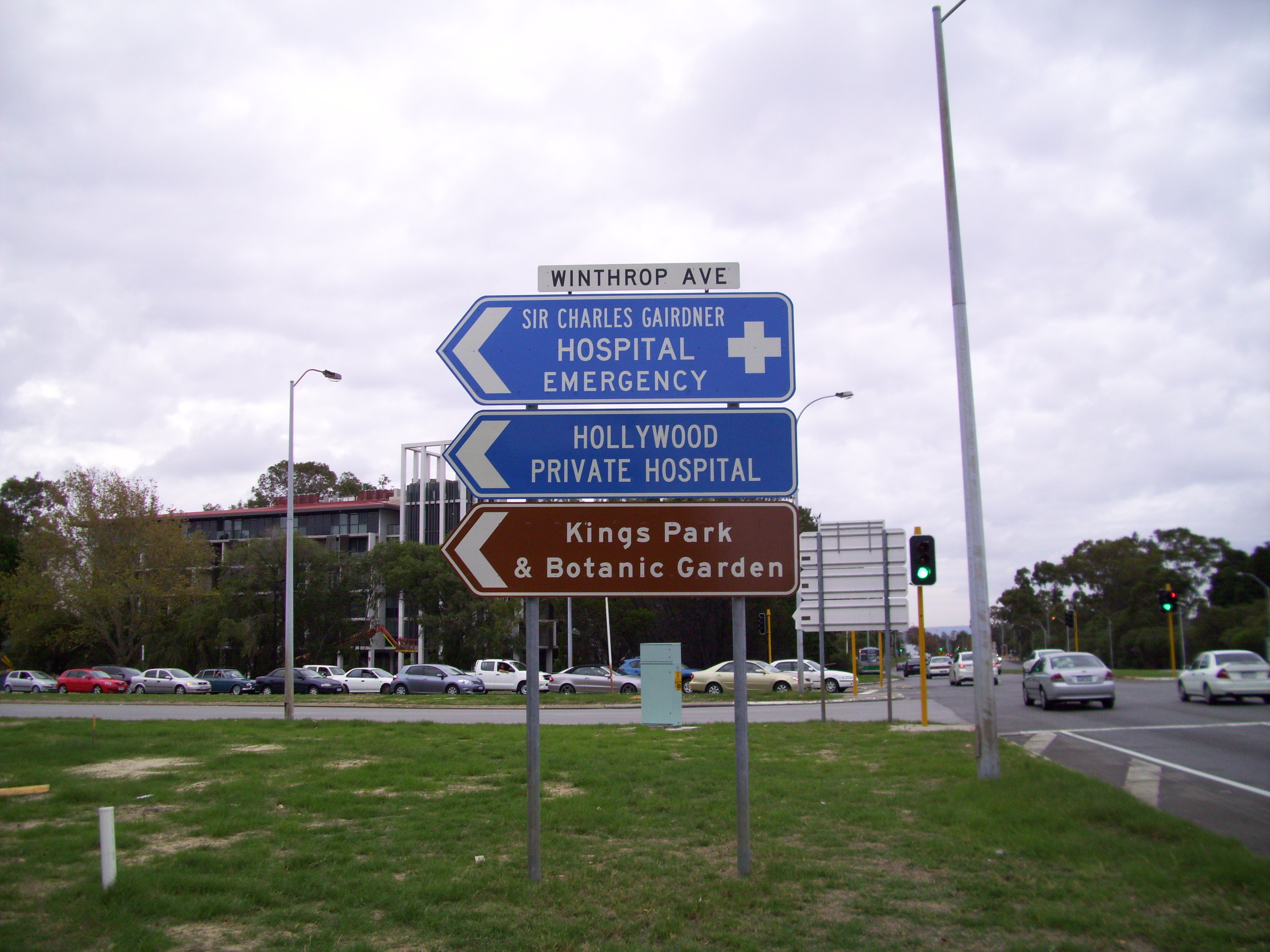
The directional sign for Winthrop Avenues includes Sir Charles Gairdner Hospital and Kings Park

Winthrop Avenue's southern terminus is at the intersection of Stirling Highway and Mounts Bay Road. Directly south of the intersection is the Crawley campus of the University of Western Australia, with residential colleges Curie Hall and Saint Catherine's College located north-east and north-west respectively. Past the colleges, 200 metres (660 ft) north of the intersection, the road becomes the boundary between Kings Park to the east, and the suburb of Nedlands to the west. From this point north, Winthrop Avenue is also part of Tourist Drive 200, a circular route around Kings Park. Residential properties line the northbound carriageway for 350 metres (1,150 ft), until the Monash Avenue traffic light controlled intersection. North of this intersection is the Queen Elizabeth II Medical Centre, where Sir Charles Gairdner Hospital is located. Winthrop Avenue travels alongside the medical centre site for 700 metres (2,300 ft) until its northern terminus at Aberdare Road, at the southern edge of Shenton Park. The road, and State Route 61, continue north-east as Thomas Street, towards West Perth and Subiaco.

== Major intersections ==
Winthrop Avenue's major intersections are controlled by traffic lights.

LGA	Location	km	mi	Destinations	Notes
Perth–Nedlands boundary	Kings Park–Nedlands–Shenton Park tripoint	0.0	0.0	Aberdare Road – Karrakatta, Queen Elizabeth II Medical Centre	Northern terminus. Continues as Thomas Street (State Route 61) northbound.
Perth–Nedlands boundary	Kings Park–Nedlands boundary	0.25	0.16	Queen Elizabeth II Medical Centre parking access	
Perth–Nedlands boundary	Kings Park–Nedlands boundary	0.35	0.22	The Kids' Bridge/Koolangka Bridge	
Perth–Nedlands boundary	Kings Park–Nedlands boundary	0.65	0.40	Monash Avenue	
Perth	Crawley	1.2	0.75	Mounts Bay Road east / Stirling Highway west (State Route 5) – Fremantle, Claremont, Perth	Southern terminus of both Winthrop Avenue and State Route 61. Continues as an entrance to the University of Western Australia. Traffic can enter the UWA entrance on the south side of the intersection but cannot exit.
1.000 mi = 1.609 km; 1.000 km = 0.621 mi: Incomplete access; Note: Intersections with minor local roads are not shown
