= Mounts Bay Road =

Road in Perth, Western Australia

Mounts Bay Road, Perth Western Australia
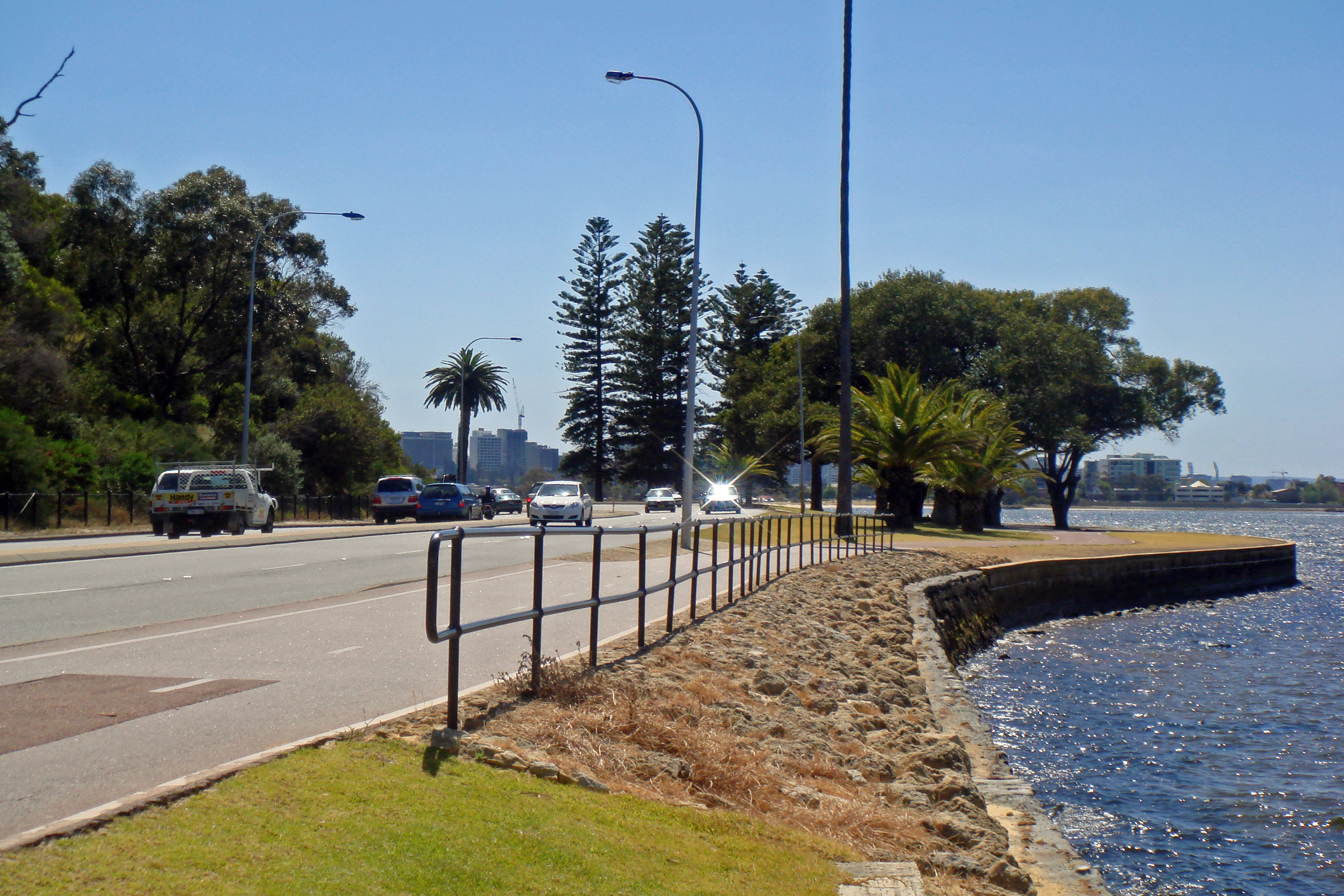
- View east along Mounts Bay Road

General information
- Type: Road
- Length: 4.8 km (3.0 mi)
- Route number(s): State Route 5

Major junctions
- Southwest end: Stirling Highway (State Route 5) in Crawley
- Winthrop Avenue (State Route 61); Riverside Drive (State Route 5); Mitchell / Kwinana freeways (State Route 2); William Street (State Route 53)
- Northeast end: The Esplanade (State Route 5) in Perth

Mounts Bay Road is a major road in Perth, Western Australia, extending southwest from the central business district along the north bank of the Swan River, at the base of Kings Park.

== Route description ==
Mounts Bay Road runs between William Street and Winthrop Avenue in Crawley, continuing towards Fremantle as Stirling Highway and linking Perth with the University of Western Australia (UWA) and the riverside suburbs of Nedlands and Claremont. The road circles around the northern and western sides of The Narrows Interchange, which was built on reclaimed land. The interchange connects to the Mitchell and Kwinana freeways, and the Narrows Bridge. To the east it travels to William Street and The Esplanade, along northern side of the Perth Convention & Exhibition Centre and the Elizabeth Quay bus station. South-west of the interchange the Point Lewis Rotary connects the road with an entrance ramp to the Kwinana Freeway southbound, and westbound traffic from Riverside Drive (which is one-way at that point). Mounts Bay Road then follows the Swan River estuary, and forms the southern and southeastern boundary for Kings Park. It ends at an intersection with Winthrop Avenue and Stirling Highway, overlooked by UWA's Winthrop Hall.

Mounts Bay Road is also home to the Old Swan Brewery, as well as a number of expensive high rise apartments and hotels overlooking the river.

== History ==
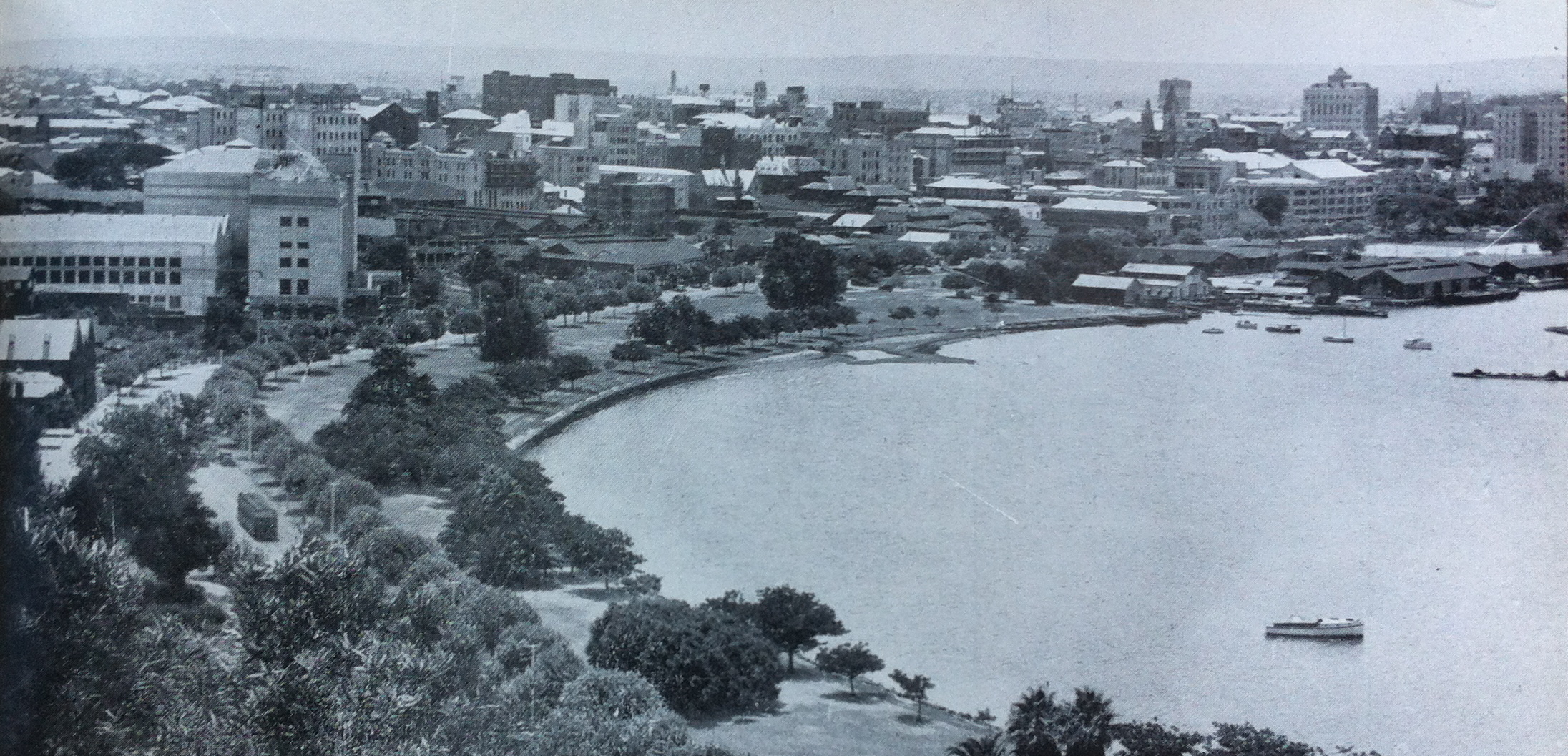
Mounts Bay Road is the roadway at left, the water is what was known as Mounts Bay, photo taken from Mount Eliza around 1947

Mounts Bay Road was named after Mounts Bay in 1845, the body of water in the Swan River Estuary that was infilled for the construction of the Narrows Interchange, and the road follows the boundary of the bay at the Narrows. Prior to its new naming, it was known as Morgan Street after J. Morgan, the Resident Magistrate of Perth in 1832, who built the original road.

It was, during the era of trams in Perth, a notable location of tram derailment.

Main Roads Western Australia installed roundabout metering traffic lights on Mounts Bay Road's eastern approach to the Point Lewis Rotary during 2013. The signals have the usual red and yellow signal phases, plus a blank phase for proceeding through the roundabout, following the normal roundabout rules. The signals are activated when queue detectors on the Kwinana Freeway on-ramp and Mounts Bay Road southbound, out of Perth, indicate there is sufficient traffic congestion. Eastbound traffic on Mounts Bay Road is expected to experience only minimal delay, while the roundabout intersection is expected to operate more efficiently, preventing gridlock and reducing the number of crashes. Construction started in October 2013, with the roundabout metering signals beginning operation on 9 November 2013.

During the 2010s, The City of Perth planned to upgrade Mounts Bay Road to accommodate increasing traffic demand and improve accessibility. The plan would reintroduce two-way traffic between Mill and William Streets, which was at the time to eastbound traffic. A new shared pedestrian and cycle path would be constructed along that same section, and the median-side lanes would be converted into bus priority lanes. Existing onroad parking would be retained, as would existing trees. The plan proposes widening the southbound carriageway into the adjacent Sir John Oldham Park. The required amount of land is described as "small portions along the edge". The project is still in the planning phase. The conversion was completed during 2014. A bus lane opened in 2015.

== Major intersections ==
All intersections listed are signalised unless otherwise mentioned.

Location	km	mi	Destinations	Notes
Perth	0	0.0	William Street (State Route 5 south) - Mount Lawley, Northbridge, Fremantle	Eastern terminus, continues east as The Esplanade (State Route 5). No right turn from William Street south to Mounts Bay Road west. No left turn from William Street north to Mounts Bay Road West.
Perth	0.4	0.25	Mill Street	Access to Elizabeth Quay bus station and Perth Convention & Exhibition Centre. No left or right turn permitted from Mounts Bay Road westbound.
Perth	0.5	0.31	Spring Street northbound / Mitchell Freeway (State Route 2) southbound - Stirling, Joondalup, Yanchep	No right turn permitted from Mounts Bay Road west to Spring Street. Freeway northbound entry and southbound exit ramps only.
Perth	0.8	0.50	Kwinana Freeway (State Route 2)	Northbound exit ramp only.
Perth	1.5	0.93	Birdiya Drive (State Route 5) eastbound / Kwinana Freeway (State Route 2) southbound Cockburn Central, Rockingham, Mandurah	Point Lewis Rotary. Roundabout with peak traffic lights on Mounts Bay Road eastbound. Freeway southbound entry ramp only
Crawley	4.4	2.7	Hackett Drive - Nedlands, Dalkeith, Matilda Bay	Access to University of Western Australia
Crawley	4.8	3.0	Winthrop Avenue (State Route 61) - Subiaco, West Perth, Joondanna, Sir Charles Gairdner Hospital, University of Western Australia	Western terminus. Continues as Stirling Highway (State Route 5) westbound. Traffic can enter the UWA entrance on the south side of the intersection but cannot exit.
1.000 mi = 1.609 km; 1.000 km = 0.621 mi: Incomplete access; Route transition
