= HMAS Arafura =

Patrol vessel of RAN

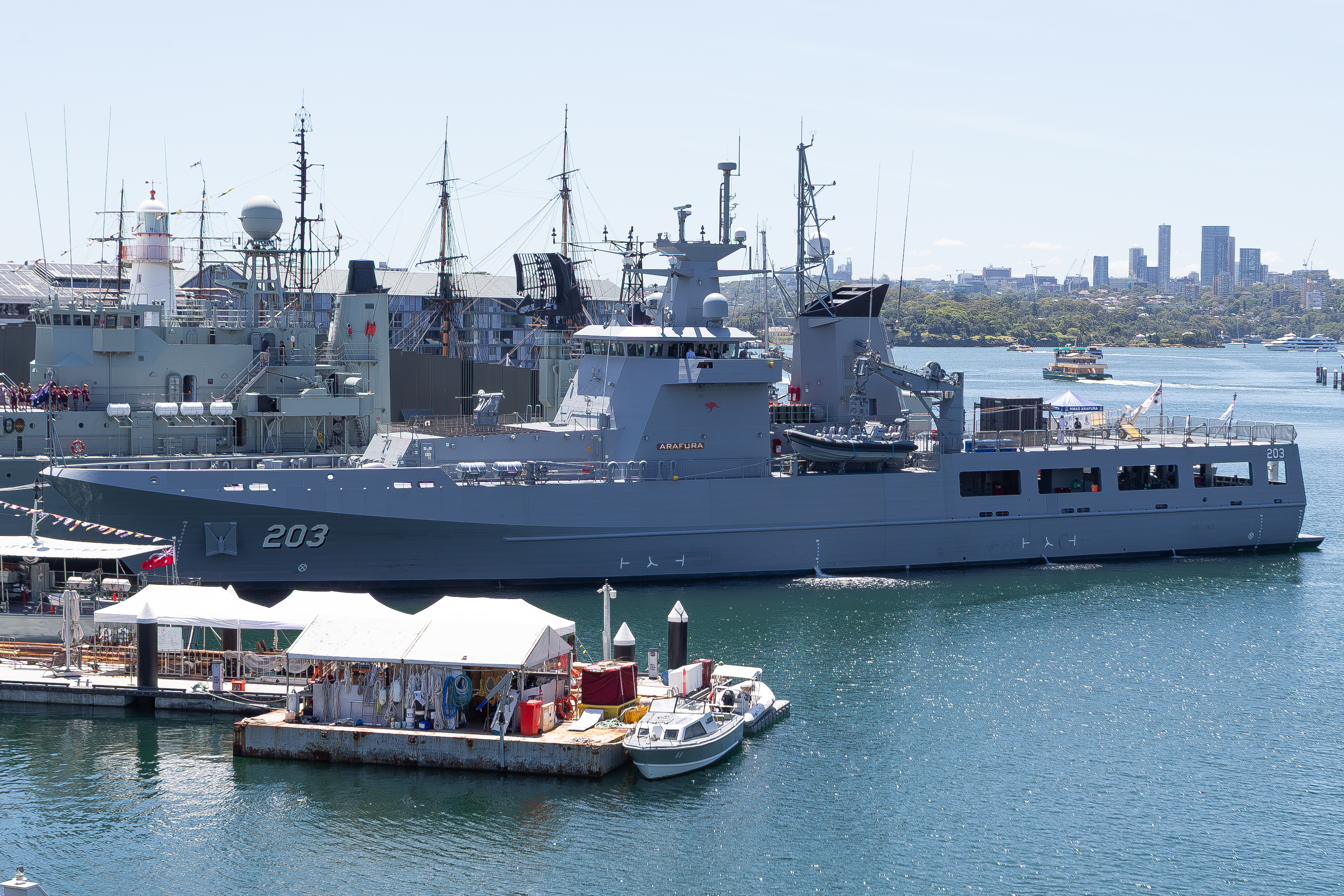
- HMAS Arafura moored in Darling Harbour next to the former HMAS Vampire

History

Australia
- Namesake: Arafura Sea
- Builder: BAE Systems
- Laid down: 10 May 2019
- Launched: 16 December 2021
- Commissioned: 28 June 2025
- Motto: Intercept
- Status: Active

General characteristics
- Class & type: Arafura-class offshore patrol vessel
- Displacement: 1,640 tonnes
- Length: 80 m (262 ft 6 in)
- Beam: 13 m (42 ft 8 in)
- Draught: 4 m (13 ft 1 in)
- Propulsion: 2 x 4,250 kW (5,700 hp) diesel engines
- Speed: 20 knots (37 km/h; 23 mph) (maximum)
- Range: 4,000 nmi (7,400 km; 4,600 mi)
- Troops: 60
- Complement: 40
- Sensors & processing systems: Saab Situational Awareness System (SAS) with Saab EOS500 electro-optical fire control director, Terma SCANTER 6002 radar, Safran Vigy Engage electro-optical surveillance and fire control multisensor system
- Armament: 2 x .50 calibre machine guns; 2 x 8.5 metre sea boats (side launched); 1 x 10.5 metre sea boat (stern launched)
- Aviation facilities: Small flight deck; light UAV capability to be integrated under Project Sea 129

HMAS Arafura (OPV 203), named to represent Australia's interests in the Arafura Sea, is the lead ship of the Arafura-class offshore patrol vessels currently conducting sea trials for the Royal Australian Navy. The ship is based on the Lürssen OPV80 design, and is being constructed by BAE Systems at the Osborne Naval Shipyard in Osborne, South Australia. It was planned that the ship would enter service in 2022. However, this was significantly delayed due to emerging problems with the seaworthiness of the class and its combat capabilities. As part of a re-design, the originally envisaged OTO Marlin 40 mm main gun was removed and replaced with a 25mm gun taken from the retiring Armidale-class vessels on an planned interim basis. HMAS Arafura was delivered to the navy in February 2025, and commissioned on 28 June 2025.

Construction of the ship began on 15 November 2018 at Osborne Naval Shipyard. Arafura was launched on 16 December 2021, sponsored by Nova Peris. After long delays due to structural fire protection design issues, builders' sea trials began on 26 August 2024.

== Career ==
Arafura was commissioned in HMAS Stirling, Fremantle on 28 June 2025, three years after it was launched.
