= HMAS Eyre =

Patrol vessel of RAN

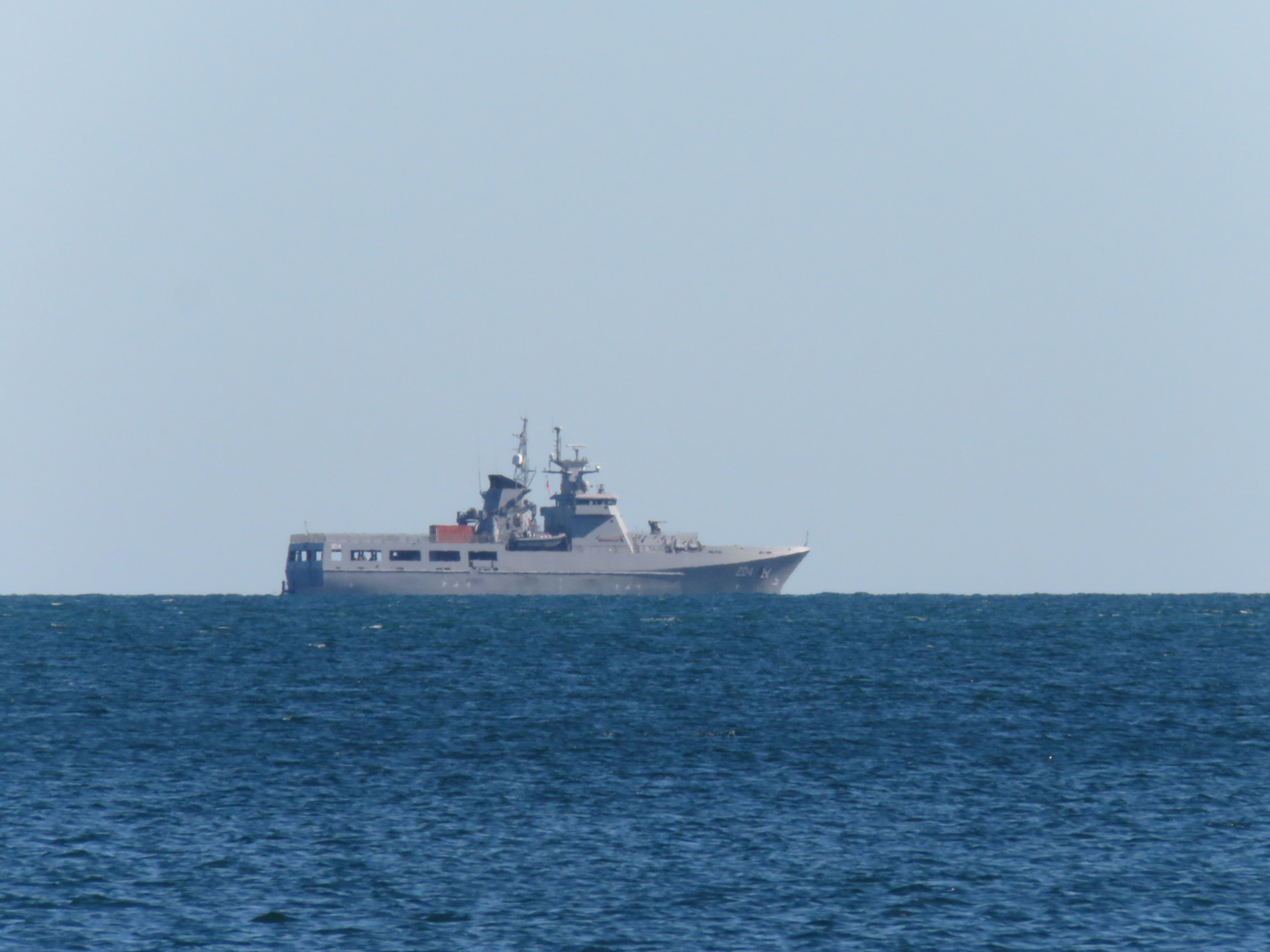
- HMAS Eyre in Cockburn Sound, Western Australia, in May 2026

History

Australia
- Namesake: Eyre Peninsula, South Australia
- Builder: BAE Systems
- Laid down: 9 April 2020
- Launched: 22 November 2023
- Commissioned: 30 May 2026
- Status: Active

General characteristics
- Class & type: Arafura-class offshore patrol vessel
- Displacement: 1,640 tonnes
- Length: 80 m (262 ft 6 in)
- Beam: 13 m (42 ft 8 in)
- Draught: 4 m (13 ft 1 in)
- Propulsion: 2 x 4,250 kW (5,700 hp) diesel engines
- Speed: 20 knots (37 km/h; 23 mph) (maximum)
- Range: 4,000 nmi (7,400 km; 4,600 mi)
- Troops: 60
- Complement: 40
- Sensors & processing systems: Saab Situational Awareness System (SAS) with Saab EOS500 electro-optical fire control director, Terma SCANTER 6002 radar, Safran Vigy Engage electro-optical surveillance and fire control multisensor system
- Armament: 2 x .50 calibre machine guns; 2 x 8.5 metre sea boats (side launched); 1 x 10.5 metre sea boat (stern launched)
- Aviation facilities: Small flight deck; light UAV capability to be integrated under Project Sea 129

HMAS Eyre (OPV 204), is the Royal Australian Navy's second ship of the Arafura-class offshore patrol vessels. The ship is based on the Lürssen OPV80 design, and was constructed by BAE Systems at the Osborne Naval Shipyard in Osborne, South Australia. She began sea trials in July 2025. Eyre was commissioned on 30 May 2026.
