= Civmec =

Singaporean-Australian public company

Civmec Limited
- Type: Dual-listed public company
- Traded as: SGX: P9D; ASX: CVL
- Industry: Construction; Engineering; Maintenance; Shipbuilding
- Founded: 1990
- Headquarters: Henderson, Western Australia
- Key people: James Fitzgerald (Chairman); Pat Tallon (CEO)
- Revenue: $810.6 million (2024/25)
- Operating income: $91.7 million (2024/25)
- Net income: $42.5 million (2024/25)
- Number of employees: 3,000 (June 2025)
- Website: www.civmec.com.au

Civmec Limited is a dual-listed Australian-Singaporean public company involved in the construction, engineering and shipbuilding industries. Headquartered in Perth, Western Australia, it specialises in fabrication and construction for the oil, gas, mining, infrastructure, marine and defence industries and has been involved in a number of significant Australian mining and civil engineering projects. Civmec has been selected to build a number of vessels and facilities for the Royal Australian Navy.

== History ==
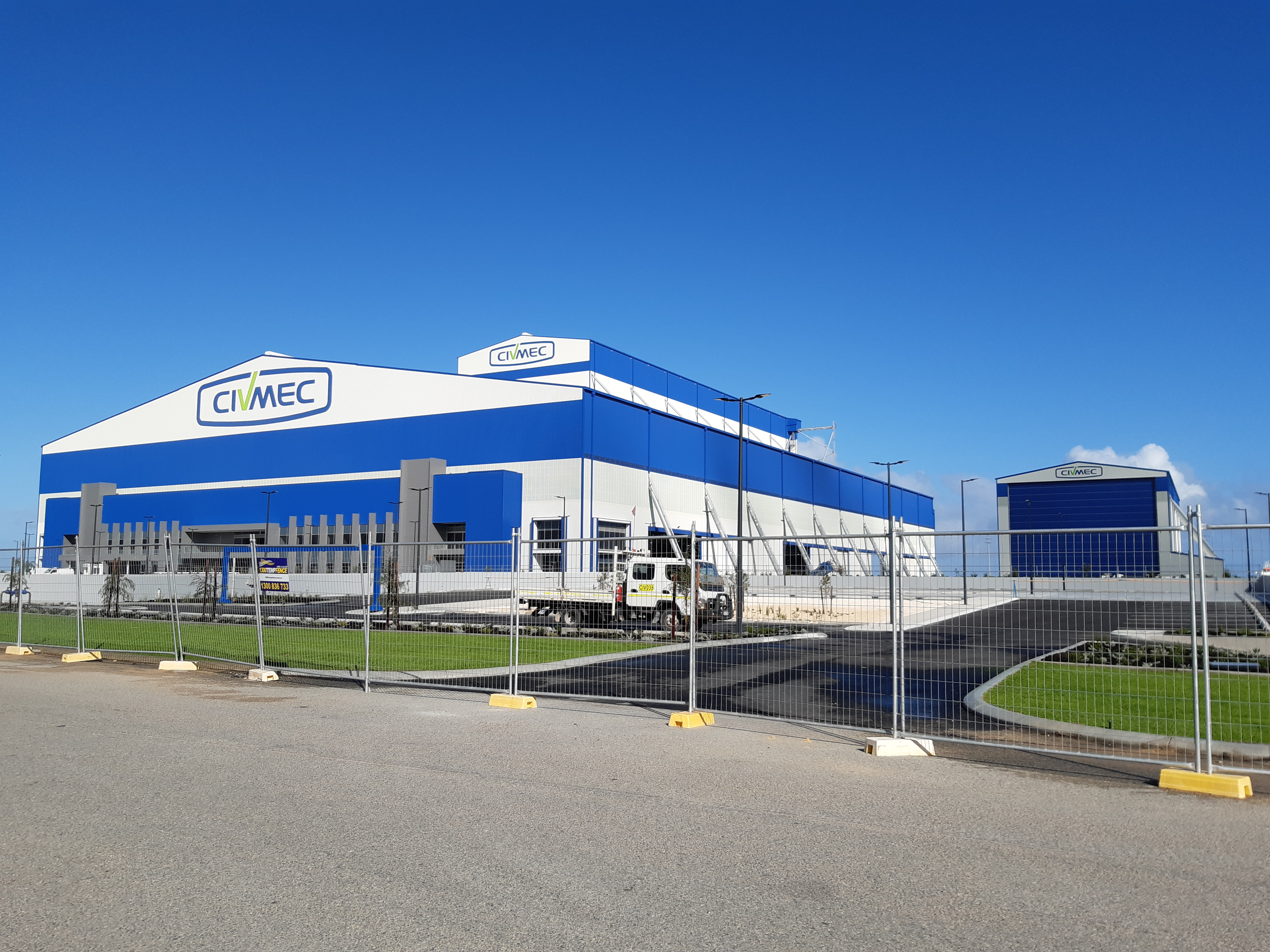
Civmec's headquarters at the Australian Marine Complex in Henderson, Western Australia

Civmec was established in 1990, becoming part of the VDM Group in 2006. In 2009, it was sold in a management buyout. It was listed on the Singapore Exchange in 2012, and became a dual-listed company when listed on the Australian Securities Exchange on 22 June 2018. In September 2024, Civmec announced that it had redomiciled the parent company from Singapore to Australia.

Civmec's main facilities are in Henderson and Newcastle and it has regional facilities in Gladstone and Port Hedland. The Henderson headquarters sits on 120,000 square metres of land, and its fabrication plant is the largest in the southern hemisphere. An expansion to the shipbuilding and maintenance facility in 2018 and 2019 resulted in an undercover facility with 53,000 square metres of space, which is the largest in Australia.

Up until 2015, Civmec had largely concentrated on mining and energy-based projects, holding engineering contracts for Shell Australia's Prelude floating liquefied natural gas facility, Chevron Corporation's Gorgon and Wheatstone gas facilities, Inpex's Ichthys gas field and Woodside Energy's Persephone project. Around this time, although the company's mining-based contracts continued, the company diversified its work and moved to infrastructure-based projects. Since this time it has undertaken the construction of a number of significant infrastructure projects in Perth and New South Wales as well as commenced defence projects.

In November 2015, Civmec agreed terms to purchase Forgacs Marine & Defence. The company saw the purchase as an opportunity to set up a facility on Australia's east coast, and to pursue opportunities to enter into military contracts for submarines, offshore patrol boats and frigates for the Royal Australian Navy (RAN). The purchase, which included the Forgacs Shipyard in Tomago, New South Wales, was completed in February 2016 and resulted in over 150 job losses.

In 2018, Civmec commenced building twelve (later reduced to six) of the Arafura-class offshore patrol vessels for the RAN, and in 2020 commenced building the RAN's new submarine rescue at its Henderson facility, which included a launch and recovery system, hyperbaric treatment unit, and maintenance training and testing infrastructure with a seven-metre deep pool. This facility was completed in 2021.

In June 2025, Civmec purchased Luerssen's Australian operations.

== Notable projects ==
- Elizabeth Quay pedestrian footbridge
- Perth Stadium supply and installation of steelwork
- Matagarup Bridge fabrication and painting
- The Kids' Bridge
- Arafura-class offshore patrol vessels construction of six ships of the class
- Boorloo Bridge fabrication and construction
