= Perth Children's Hospital =

Hospital in Perth, Western Australia

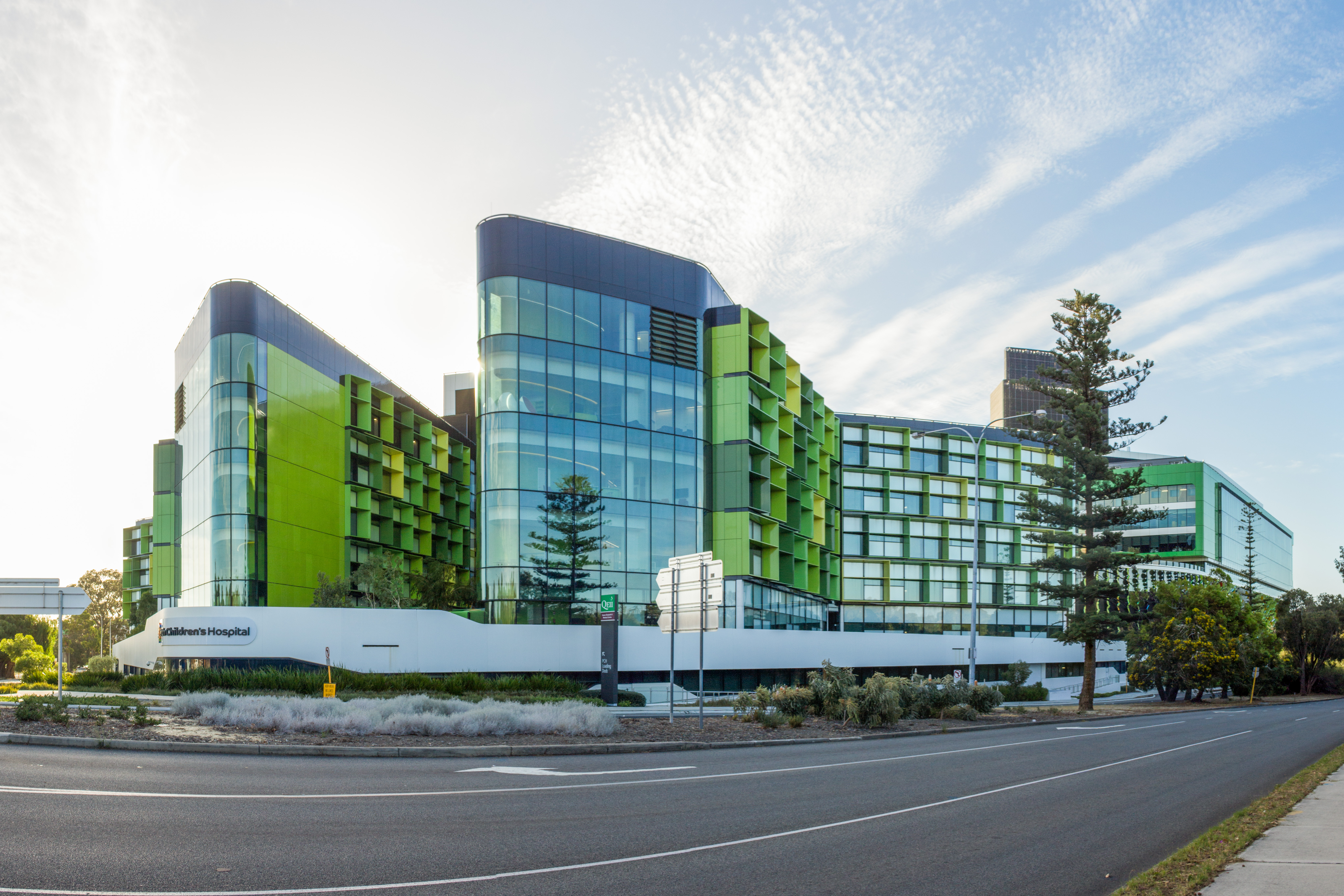

Geography
- Location: Nedlands, City of Perth, Western Australia, Australia
- Coordinates: 31°58′11″S 115°49′00″E

Organisation
- Care system: Public Medicare (AU)
- Type: Specialist tertiary

Services
- Emergency department: Yes
- Beds: 298

History
- Founded: 12 May 2018; 8 years ago

Links
- Website: pch.health.wa.gov.au
- Lists: Hospitals in Australia

Perth Children's Hospital (PCH) is a specialist children's hospital in Nedlands, Western Australia, located at the corner of Winthrop Avenue and Monash Avenue on the Queen Elizabeth II Medical Centre (QEII) site. It is Western Australia's specialist paediatric hospital and trauma centre, providing medical care to children and adolescents up to 16 years of age.

This hospital provides treatment for the most serious medical cases, as well as secondary services including inpatient, outpatient and day-stay care for children and young people.

== History ==
In 2008, the state government announced that a new children's hospital would be built to replace Princess Margaret Hospital for Children. In January 2012, Premier Colin Barnett and Minister for Health Kim Hames held a groundbreaking ceremony to mark the beginning of the construction.

On 30 September 2013, Premier Colin Barnett announced that the new 298-bed hospital would use the original 1909 name, Perth Children's Hospital. This name was chosen as part of efforts to promote "Perth as a major centre for medical health and medical research".

After structural and medical problems with the building delayed the hospital's opening multiple times, the hospital officially opened on 12 May 2018—although some departments started operating earlier than that. Outpatients began to be accepted on 14 May 2018. Surgery opened on 28 May 2018, followed by the emergency department on 10 June 2018 coinciding with the closure of Princess Margaret Hospital.

== Transport ==
PCH is 6 kilometres (3.7 mi) from the Perth city centre, adjacent to Winthrop Avenue and opposite the western boundary of Kings Park. Drop off and pick up bays are available outside the main entrance and the emergency department. Paid parking may be available in the basement carpark at PCH (accessible from the southern end of Hospital Avenue), and in the QEII multi-deck carpark (accessible from Winthrop Avenue). The nearest public transport stops are along Hospital Avenue and Monash Avenue, operated by Transperth.

A pedestrian bridge, dual-named as The Kids' Bridge and Koolangka Bridge, was built in 2021, linking PCH with Kings Park.

== Controversy ==
In April 2021, seven-year-old Aishwarya Aswath died, reportedly within 15 minutes of "a doctor finally" seeing her, at Perth Children's Hospital after waiting about two hours in the emergency department before doctors attended to her, despite her parents asking for help "four or five times". A month prior, emergency nurses at the hospital had formally warned of staffing levels and safety, pointing out "several incidents resulting in significant harm to patients".

== See also ==
- List of hospitals in Western Australia
- Health care in Australia
