= Forgacs Marine and Defence =

Australian engineering and shipbuilding company

Forgacs Marine and Defence Pty Ltd
- Formerly: Forgacs Group
- Type: Subsidiary
- Industry: Maritime engineering
- Founder: Stephen Forgacs
- Headquarters: Newcastle, New South Wales, Australia
- Area served: Worldwide
- Products: Ship building Ship repair Heavy engineering
- Number of employees: 1,000
- Parent: Civmec
- Website: www.forgacs.com.au

former Forgacs Group logo

Forgacs Marine and Defence, previously Forgacs Group is a major Australian engineering and shipbuilding company. It has facilities in Newcastle, Sydney, Brisbane and Gladstone.

Forgacs Group acquired Ullman Engineering in 1962. Following this, in 1987, it acquired the Newcastle Floating Dock.

Shipbuilder Carrington Slipways was acquired in 1997, followed by the Cairncross Dockyard facilities in Brisbane in 1999. Cairncross performed commercial ship repairs and included one of the largest graving docks in Australasia. The dockyard could accommodate ships up to the Panamax sized class.

Forgacs conducts refit and maintenance work for the Royal Australian Navy, including the repair and extensive conversion of the Kanimbla-class landing platform amphibious (LPA) ships, following their purchase from the United States Navy. Forgacs constructed hull blocks for the Anzac-class frigate and in 2009 they were contracted to build 30 hull blocks for the Hobart-class destroyer being constructed in Adelaide for the Royal Australian Navy.

In August 2014, the company's facilities at the Cairncross Dockyard closed. In the same month, aircraft component manufacturer Broens was purchased. On 17 November 2015, Civmec agreed terms to acquire Forgacs. The transaction was completed on 2 February 2016 with the business renamed Forgacs Marine and Defence.
