= Caroline Homer =

Australian medical researcher and advocate for women's health rights

Caroline Homer AO FAHMS
- Education: University of Sydney
- Alma mater: University of Technology Sydney
- Scientific career
- Workplaces: Burnet Institute; University of Technology Sydney; World Health Organization
- Thesis: Continuity of maternity care in a community setting: A randomised controlled trial using the Zelan design (2001)

Caroline Susan E. Homer is an Australian midwifery researcher and international advocate for women's health rights. She is Co-Program Director, Maternal and Child Health at the Burnet Institute in Melbourne and Visiting Distinguished Professor of Midwifery at the University of Technology Sydney.

== Academic career ==
Homer graduated from University of Technology Sydney with a masters in nursing (1997) and PhD titled Continuity of maternity care in a community setting : a randomised controlled trial using the Zelan design (2001). She completed a masters of medical science at the University of Sydney in 2008.

Homer was appointed Co-Program Director, Maternal and Child Health at the Burnet Institute in 2018. She was a member of the World Health Organization (WHO) Maternal and Perinatal Health Executive Guideline Development Group from 2017 to 2020 and was then appointed Inaugural Chair of WHO's Strategic and Technical Advisory Group of Experts for Maternal, Newborn, Child, Adolescent Health, and Nutrition from 2020 to 2022.

As of 2021 she is on the board of the Perinatal Society of Australia and New Zealand and is a former president of the Australian College of Midwives (ACM) and has been editor of their journal, Women and Birth, since July 2018.

In 2020, the WHO's international year of the nurse and the midwife, she reviewed and wrote on care by midwives in low-, middle- and high-income countries and also answered the question, "What Would Florence think of midwives and nurses in 2020?"

Homer has been a Member of the Council of National Health and Medical Research Council since 2018 and chair for the current term, July 2021 to June 2024.

== Honours and recognition ==
In 2013 Homer was made a life member of ACM (NSW) and they set up the Caroline Homer Writing Prize in the same year in her honour.

Homer was made an Officer of the Order of Australia in the 2017 Queen's Birthday Honours for "distinguished service to medicine in the field of midwifery as a clinician, researcher, author and educator, through the development of worldwide education standards, and to professional organisations". She was elected a Fellow of the Australian Academy of Health and Medical Sciences in 2019.

== Selected works ==
=== Books ===
- Homer, Caroline; Brodie, Pat; Leap, Nicky, eds. (2008), Midwifery Continuity of Care: A Practical Guide, Elsevier Health Sciences, ISBN 978-0-7295-7844-8
- Gray, Joanne; Smith, Rachel; Homer, Caroline (2008), Illustrated dictionary of midwifery, Harcourt Australia, ISBN 978-0-7295-3863-3

=== Articles ===
- Karen Hobday; Jennifer Hulme; Ndola Prata; Páscoa Zualo Wate; Suzanne Belton; Homer, Caroline (2019). "Scaling Up Misoprostol to Prevent Postpartum Hemorrhage at Home Births in Mozambique: A Case Study Applying the ExpandNet/WHO Framework". Global health, science and practice. 7 (1): 66–86. doi:10.9745/ghsp-d-18-00475. PMC 6538124. PMID 30926738. Wikidata Q92707828.
- Gianna Robbers; Vogel, Joshua; Glen Mola; John Bolgna; Homer, Caroline (2019). "Maternal and newborn health indicators in Papua New Guinea - 2008-2018". Sexual and reproductive health matters. 27 (1) 1686199. doi:10.1080/26410397.2019.1686199. PMID 31790637. Wikidata Q91606148.
- Musgrave, Loretta M.; Kizirian, Nathalie V.; Homer, Caroline; Gordon, Adrienne (2020). "Mobile Phone Apps in Australia for Improving Pregnancy Outcomes: Systematic Search on App Stores". JMIR mHealth and uHealth. 8 (11) e22340. doi:10.2196/22340. PMC 7704277. PMID 33196454. Wikidata Q102070662.
- Claudia Ravaldi; Valdo Ricca; Alyce Wilson; Homer, Caroline; Vannacci, Alfredo (2020). "Previous psychopathology predicted severe COVID-19 concern, anxiety, and PTSD symptoms in pregnant women during "lockdown" in Italy". Archives of Women's Mental Health. doi:10.1007/s00737-020-01086-0. PMID 33215247. Wikidata Q102212272.
- Euodia Mosoro; Alyce N Wilson; Homer, Caroline; Vogel, Joshua (2020). "Assessing the quality of antenatal corticosteroids in low- and middle-income countries: A systematic review". PLOS One. 15 (12) e0243034. doi:10.1371/journal.pone.0243034. PMC 7714108. PMID 33270682. Wikidata Q104059404.
- Roth, Heike; Homer, Caroline; Grace LeMarquand; Lynne M Roberts; LIsa Hanley; Mark Brown; Amanda Henry (2020). "Assessing Australian women's knowledge and knowledge preferences about long-term health after hypertensive disorders of pregnancy: a survey study". BMJ Open. 10 (12): e042920. PMC 7747529. PMID 33334841. Wikidata Q104494827.
