= Cholguahue Airport =

- IATA: none; ICAO: SCGH

Summary
- Airport type: Private
- Serves: Los Ángeles
- Elevation AMSL: 732 ft / 223 m
- Coordinates: 37°28′15″S 72°8′18″W

Map
- Location of Cholguahue Airport in Chile

Runways
Direction	Length		Surface
Direction	m	ft	Surface
17/35	600	1,969	Gravel
- Source: Landings.com Google Maps GCM

Cholguahue Airport Spanish: Aeropuerto Cholguahue, (ICAO: SCGH) is an airport 18 kilometres (11 mi) east of Los Ángeles, the capital of Bío Bío Province in the Bío Bío Region of Chile.

The runway has an additional 380 metres (1,250 ft) of unpaved overrun on the south end.

The Los Angeles VOR (Ident: MAD) is located 14.2 nautical miles (26.3 km) west-northwest of the airport.

== See also ==
- Transport in Chile
- List of airports in Chile
