= Nedlands, Western Australia =

Nedlands
- Suburb
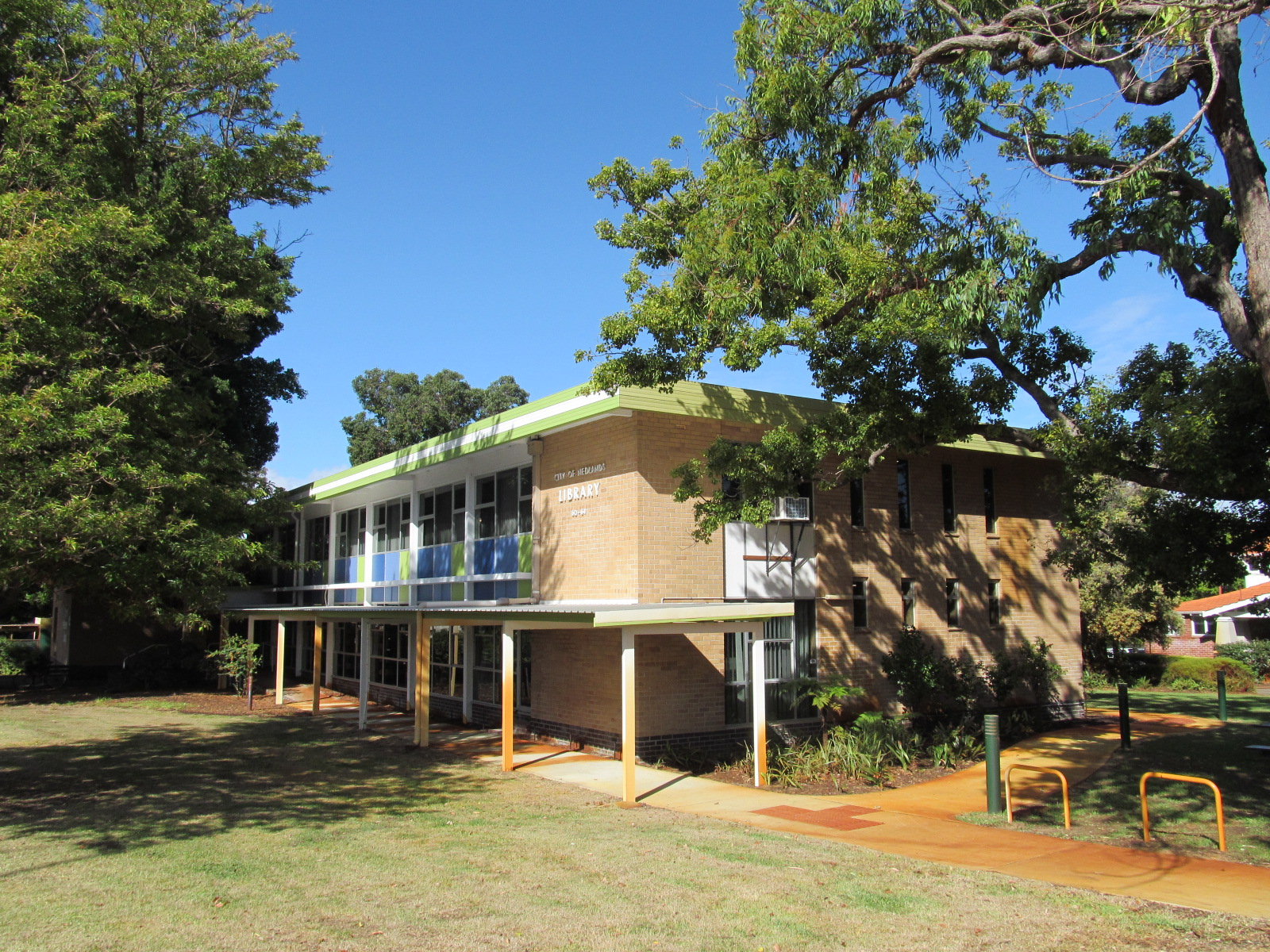
- Nedlands library
- Interactive map of Nedlands
- Coordinates: 31.982°S 115.807°E
- Country: Australia
- State: Western Australia
- City: Perth
- LGAs: City of Nedlands; City of Perth
- Location: 7 km (4.3 mi) WSW of the Perth CBD

Government
  - State electorate: Nedlands
  - Federal division: Curtin

Area
  - Total: 5.3 km^{2} (2.0 sq mi)

Population
  - Total: 10,561 (SAL 2021)
- Postcode: 6009
Suburbs around Nedlands
Karrakatta	Shenton Park	Kings Park
Claremont	Nedlands	Crawley
	Dalkeith

Nedlands is a western suburb of Perth, the capital city of Western Australia. It is a part of the local government areas of the City of Nedlands and the City of Perth. It is about 7 kilometres (4 mi) from the Perth CBD via either Thomas Street or Mounts Bay Road.

== History ==
Nedlands is believed to have been named after Edward "Ned" Bruce, the son of Colonel John Bruce who purchased 40 acres (16 ha) of land in the area in 1854. The property was originally known as "Ned's Land" which was later corrupted into "Nedlands". A number of streets in the suburb are named after members of the Bruce family.

== Features ==
Nedlands is a mixed-character suburb. It contains:

- Low-cost housing for students at the neighbouring University of Western Australia
- Wealthy homes and a golf course (Nedlands Golf Club) in the southern half of the suburb
- A commercial area (located next to the Captain Stirling Hotel), restaurants and a small cinema (Windsor Cinema) along both sides of Stirling Highway
- The Lions Eye Institute, a major centre of research into eye disease; Sir Charles Gairdner Hospital, one of Perth's major public hospitals; and Hollywood Private Hospital (the former Repatriation General Hospital) and its neighbouring aged care facilities

The hospital and Stirling Highway are well served by the CircleRoute and other bus routes. Nedlands also contains some grocery shops and a library. It also contains the Perth Children's Hospital, adjoining the Sir Charles Gairdner Hospital, as part of the Queen Elizabeth II Medical Centre complex.

== Parks ==
The Peace Memorial Rose Garden on Stirling Highway commemorates lives lost in war. It was developed by the Rose Society and the Nedlands Road Board in the 1950s. It was dedicated in 1951.

== Transport ==
Nedlands is served by the CircleRoute and other services along Stirling Highway, Hampden Road, Broadway and Princess Road. All services are operated by Swan Transit.

=== Bus ===
- 23 Claremont Station to Elizabeth Quay Bus Station – serves Bruce Street, Cooper Street and Stirling Highway
- 24 Claremont Station to Point Fraser – serves Bruce Street, Hillway, Broadway, Hampden Road, Monash Avenue and Hospital Avenue
- 25 Claremont Station to Shenton Park Station – serves Princess Road, Dalkeith Road, Carrington Street, Smyth Road, Monash Avenue, Hospital Avenue and Aberdare Road
- 103 Claremont Station to Elizabeth Quay Bus Station – serves Stirling Highway, Hampden Road, Monash Avenue and Hospital Avenue
- 950 Queen Elizabeth II Medical Centre to Galleria Bus Station (high frequency) – serves Hospital Avenue, Monash Avenue and Hampden Road
- 995 Claremont Station to Elizabeth Quay Bus Station (high frequency) – serves Stirling Highway
- 998 Fremantle Station to Fremantle Station (limited stops) – CircleRoute clockwise, serves Stirling Highway, Hospital Avenue and Aberdare Road
- 999 Fremantle Station to Fremantle Station (limited stops) – CircleRoute anti-clockwise, serves Aberdare Road, Hospital Avenue and Stirling Highway

Bus routes serving Broadway, Hampden Road, Monash Avenue and Hospital Avenue:

- Purple CAT University of Western Australia to Elizabeth Quay Bus Station (free service)
- 96 University of Western Australia South to Leederville Station
- 97 University of Western Australia South to Subiaco Station

== Politics ==
Nedlands is part of the federal division of Curtin. The federal seat has traditionally been regarded as a safe seat, being continually retained by the Liberal Party with the exception of former Liberal Party member Allan Rocher as an independent politician between 1996 and 1998, but was won by independent politician Kate Chaney at the 2022 Australian federal election. For the parliament of Western Australia, the state electoral district of Nedlands is held by Liberal member Jonathan Huston.

Its easternmost booth near the university is marginal at both levels of government, and all parts of the suburb exhibit a strong Green vote (and historically environmental concerns have also resulted in a strong primary vote for Liberals for Forests).

== Climate ==
Due to its elevation, Nedlands is slightly cooler and wetter than the Perth central business district.

Climate data for Nedlands
Month	Jan	Feb	Mar	Apr	May	Jun	Jul	Aug	Sep	Oct	Nov	Dec	Year
Mean daily maximum °C (°F)	29.6 (85.3)	29.7 (85.5)	27.6 (81.7)	23.8 (74.8)	20.7 (69.3)	18.5 (65.3)	17.5 (63.5)	18.1 (64.6)	19.4 (66.9)	21.6 (70.9)	24.4 (75.9)	27.0 (80.6)	23.2 (73.8)
Mean daily minimum °C (°F)	17.8 (64.0)	18.1 (64.6)	16.6 (61.9)	13.3 (55.9)	10.9 (51.6)	9.7 (49.5)	8.5 (47.3)	8.4 (47.1)	9.6 (49.3)	11.4 (52.5)	13.7 (56.7)	16.0 (60.8)	12.8 (55.0)
Average precipitation mm (inches)	7.7 (0.30)	12.1 (0.48)	17.4 (0.69)	50.3 (1.98)	110.8 (4.36)	186.8 (7.35)	170.3 (6.70)	114.3 (4.50)	69.9 (2.75)	49.8 (1.96)	19.4 (0.76)	12.7 (0.50)	836.5 (32.93)
Average precipitation days	2.2	2.0	3.4	7.6	12.1	17.3	17.9	17.9	12.2	9.1	4.8	4.8	106.6

== Notable people ==
- David Indermaur, clinical psychologist
