= Sir Charles Gairdner Hospital =

Hospital in Perth, Western Australia

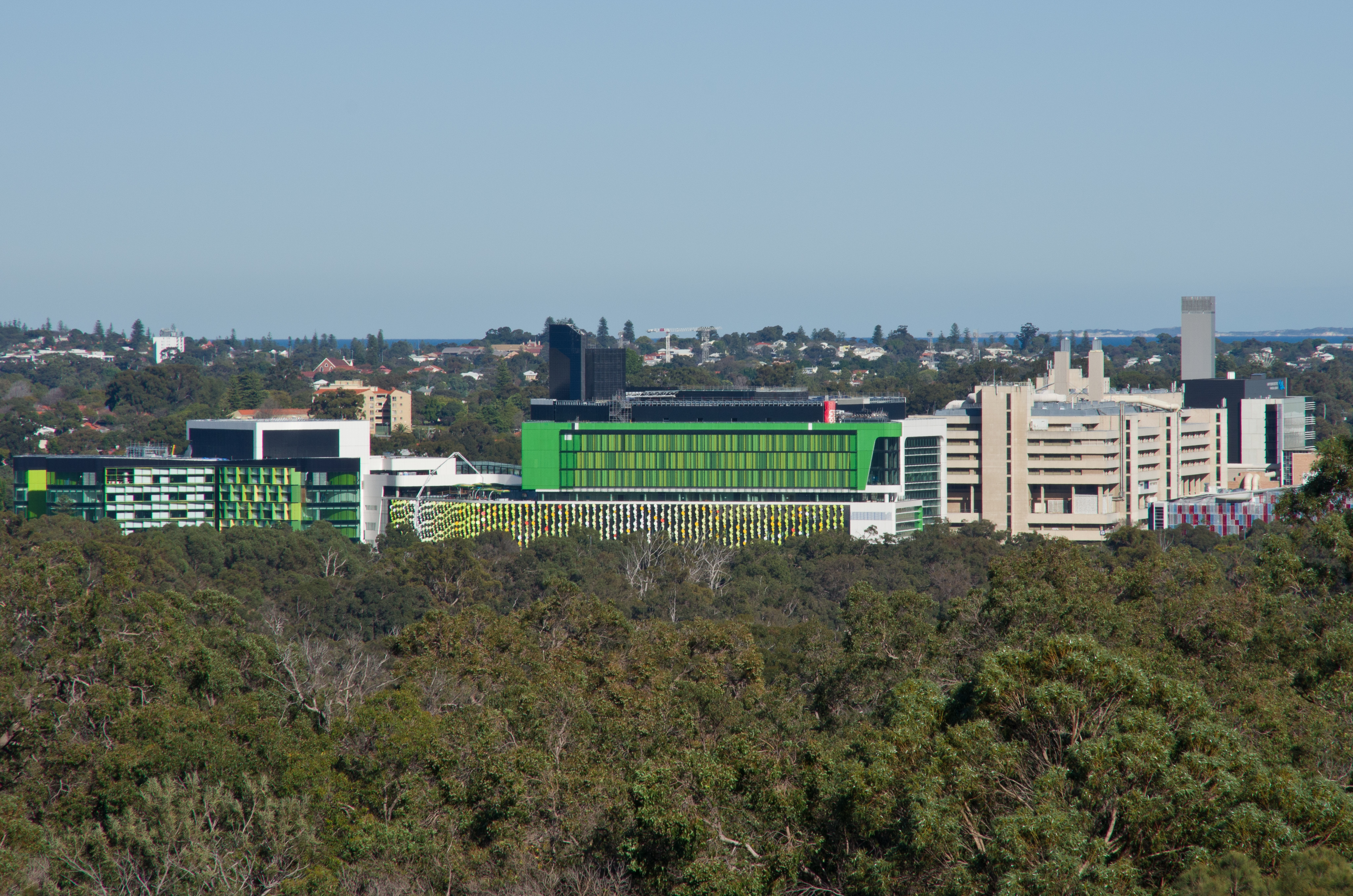
- Sir Charles Gairdner Hospital viewed from Kings Park; green buildings are the new children's hospital

Geography
- Location: Nedlands, City of Perth, Western Australia, Australia
- Coordinates: 31°58′03″S 115°48′55″E

Organisation
- Type: Teaching

Services
- Beds: 600

History
- Opened: 1958; 68 years ago

Links
- Website: www.scgh.health.wa.gov.au
- Lists: Hospitals in Australia

Sir Charles Gairdner Hospital (SCGH) is a teaching hospital in Nedlands, Western Australia.

Opened in 1958 as the Perth Chest Hospital and later named in honour of Sir Charles Gairdner, governor of Western Australia from 1951 to 1963, it is part of the Queen Elizabeth II Medical Centre (QEII MC). It is colloquially referred to as Charlie's.

All clinical specialities are provided, with the exception of complex burns, paediatrics, obstetrics, gynaecology and major trauma. It houses the state's only comprehensive cancer treatment centre, and is the state's principal hospital for neurosurgery and liver transplants. The hospital is closely associated with the nearby University of Western Australia as well as Curtin University, Notre Dame University, and Edith Cowan University.

Handling over 76,000 admissions annually, SCGH has 600 beds, and treats approximately 420,000 patients each year. As of 2012 some 5,500 staff are employed. In 2009, it was the second hospital in Australia to be awarded Magnet recognition by the American Nurses Credentialing Center.

== Development timeline and physical description ==
=== Site ===
When built as the Perth Chest Hospital, the site was initially constructed on the north by Verdun Street, with Thomas Street to the east. Thomas Street provides a route to Subiaco from Nedlands along the western border of King's Park. Original tram tracks ended along the east side of Thomas Street, however the tram service has since been closed and has been replaced by bus services. The bus services include Metro Bus Co, Parlour Cars, WA Transport and Beam Bus Co. Thomas street is now the entrance to a car park.

The development of QEII MC and SCGH can be categorised into five groups. Storey-heights are indicative of above ground height.

=== Group 1 ===
The site chosen for the construction of the new Perth Chest Hospital encompassed a largely undeveloped region of land leased to the University of Western Australia. Prior to construction in 1953, the site was named the Perth Medical Centre. The hospital building was constructed as a five-storey building laid out in a "H" shape, serving as a respiratory and teaching hospital once opened in 1958. The major wings of the building faced north and south, with an interconnecting link between the two. The function was ward accommodation but now serves other purposes. The nurses quarters (1959) was the next largest building in the medical centre, a five-storey building built in the shape of a "T". The top of the "T" faces north. The nurses quarters is now used for other purposes. The State X-Ray Building (1961) is a single-storey building located at the north western border. It now serves other purposes. Communications (1971) was built in 1971 adjacent to the former nurses quarters.

=== Group 2 ===
The School of Nursing (1968) contains FJ Clarke Lecture Theatre (1969) and Medical Library. When The School of Nursing (Q Block) was built, it was to support the hospital based nurse training program. The nurses quarters accommodated staff and trainees until the Anstey House was built were residential services were available. In 1977, to commemorate the Silver Jubilee of Elizabeth II, the hospital site was renamed to Queen Elizabeth II Medical Centre (QEII MC). The nursing program changed in the 1980s and became no longer hospital based. Accommodation for nurses was not as necessary. The last cohort of trainee nurses graduated in 1988.

=== Group 3 ===
Long Term Block (1969), Extended Care Block (1971), State Health Labs (1971), UWA Blocks (1971), Main Plant Rooms (1972), D Block – Psychiatry (1973), B Block Link Building (1975) and F Block – Radiotherapy (1975), E Block (1977).

=== Group 4 ===
The UWA medical library (1973) is a two-storey building. Anstey House (1974) is a nine-story residential building along the east–west and a single story-building extending north. St John's Ambulance Building (1985) is a single storey utility building.

=== Group 5 ===
Lion's Eye Institute (1998) is a three-storey building along the western perimeter of a courtyard around the entrance to SCGH.

=== Current development ===
As of 2020, A$40 million will be used to refurbish the emergency department at SCGH and help buy the hospital a new cyclotron machine. $19 million will contribute to the design of the emergency department to minimise overcrowding, and a behavioural assessment centre containing eight beds for behaviourally affected patients to be assessed. Construction is expected to be completed in 2023. $23.3 million is to be spent on a new cyclotron machine assisting in increasing radiopharmaceuticals for neurological conditions, cancer and other diseases.

== Establishment and history ==
SCGH resides on campus of the Queen Elizabeth II Medical Centre. The QEII MC Medical Centre Trust is an independent statutory authority that is responsible for the control, management and development of the land reserved for medical centre development.

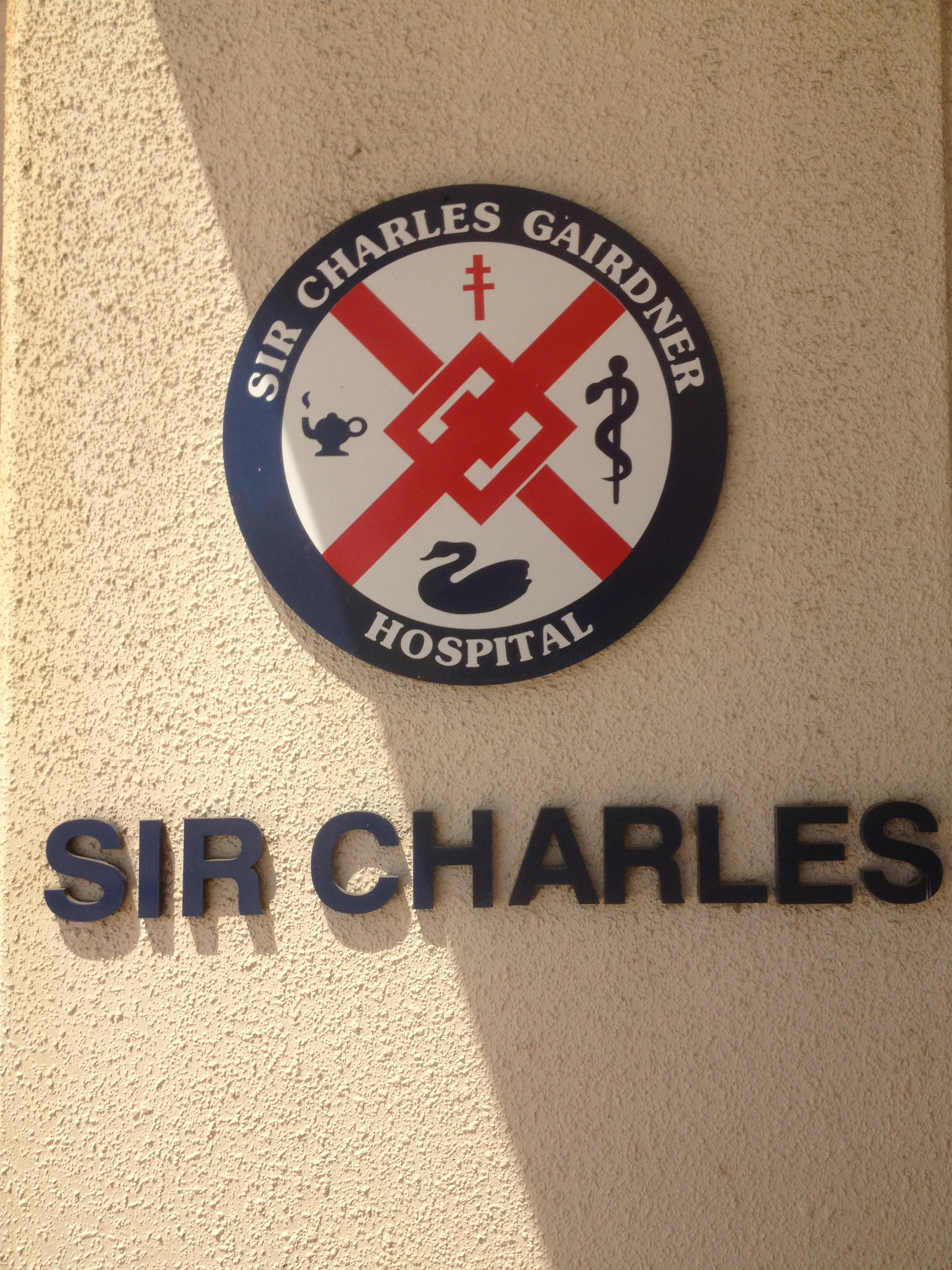
Sir Charles Gairdner Hospital crest

Sir Charles Gairdner Hospital was constructed in 1959 in the Queen Elizabeth II Medical Centre in Nedlands, and was originally named the Perth Chest Hospital. SCGH runs along the western border of Kings Park. Prior to hospital development, the site of the QEII MC belonged to George Shenton and was a grazing field for dairy cattle owned by the founder of Browne's Dairy, Edward Browne. In 1910, the State Government purchased the land, and in 1953 30 hectares (75 acres) were assigned to the development of a medical centre.

According to a report of the Commissioner for Public Health in 1953, the medical centre development was to function as a hospital and a research facility while assisting in the education of both professionals and prospective professionals of the health industry at the time. In 1961 SCGH officially became a teaching hospital. In 1963, the Perth Chest Hospital was renamed Sir Charles Gairdner Hospital in recognition of the state governor at the time. In 1968 the School of Nursing was built as the Q block, to support the nurse training program at SCGH.

The development of SCGH has integrated parts of the University of Western Australia campus. As part of the hospital's teaching core, UWA students and alumni contribute to research and clinical organisations at SCGH. Students enrolled in medicine, dentistry and biomedical sciences learn at the UWA health campus, where they have access to medical libraries. Students of dentistry and oral healthcare learn and train on the UWA health care campus at QEII MC, closely associated with SCGH.

== Research ==
Sir Charles Gairdner Hospital is the largest public sector hospital in Western Australia. The research at SCGH ranges from clinical trials to laboratory-based discovery science. Research funding comes collaboratively from Sir Charles Gairdner and Osborne Park Health Care Group and the Charlies Foundation for Research.

During the first 40 years of operation, research contributions included that of Nobel Prize winner Barry Marshall for his recognition that stomach ulcers are not caused by stress, but rather bacteria. It was the first hospital in Australia to treat rheumatoid arthritis patients using bone marrow transplantation and chemotherapy, contributing to its status as Western Australia's leading cancer centre.

In 2010 construction of a new research precinct began next to SCGH. The centre comprises research divisions, laboratories, and new facilities for PathWest, new facilities for the Telethon Institute for Child Health Research, a centre for the Western Australian Institute for Medical Research and a centre for neuroscience research.

SCGH is home to a Centre for Nursing Research. The research facility works alongside Murdoch University, Curtin University and Edith Cowan University, allowing nurses to work alongside academic researches to enhance nursing practice. The framework involves exploring issues in clinical practice and practical research programs to contribute to nursing research.

SCGH has the Australian Inherited Retinal Disease Registry and DNA Bank (AIRDR) on-site. AIRDR analyses the DNA of consenting donors from Australia to understand the cause of inherited retinal disease. The AIRDR resource is available to researchers pursuing an interest in the varying causes of inherited retinal disease.

=== Funding ===
The Charlies Research Foundation funds and supports research at SCGH and Osborne Park Hospital. The Charlies Research Foundation provides $750,000 in funding to support research projects by bringing together researchers, patients, donors, staff, sponsors and patients. When funding is allocated, preference is given to projects and clinical trials that have the highest potential to improve the outcome for patients and the future of healthcare. The Charlies Research Foundation supports young researchers by funding research projects to gather preliminary data in order to gain more funding from peak bodies. From 2015 to 2020, $7,000,000 was raised with over 125 research grants distributed. 645,000 patients have been admitted to SCGH and Osborne Park Hospital. In 2020, $750,000 has been put towards life-saving medical research; 25 major projects have been funded to save lives.

== Services ==
SCGH provides comprehensive care in all clinical specialities except for burns, paediatrics, obstetrics and gynaecology on top of social work services.

SCGH is Western Australia's only comprehensive cancer centre. It involves medical oncology, radiation oncology, haematology and a number of other services, including nutrition and dietetics, social work, the Western Australian Youth Cancer Service, oncology service pharmacists and palliative care services and a pain clinic.

=== Emergency medicine ===
In conjunction with the University of Western Australia, SCGH was the first hospital in the southern hemisphere to assign a professor in the emergency centre making it a recognised centre in emergency medicine. Comprehensive care in emergency medicine includes critical care and trauma.

=== Pathology ===
SCGH is home to many histopathology subspecialty groups that practice on-site, including dermatopathology, gastrointestinal, pancreatobiliary, hepatopathology and respiratory pathology. The histopathology department assists in medical research and clinical diagnosis of patients at SCGH.

=== Neurosurgery and liver transplant ===
SCGH is Western Australia's primary neurosurgery and liver transplant hospital. Elective neurosurgery and outpatients of neurotrauma surgery are held at SCGH. Liver transplants at SCGH are appointed under the Liver Transplant Unit, making it the treatment centre for the Western Australian Liver Transplant Service.

== Current and prospective staff ==
=== Education ===
SCGH began as a teaching hospital and assists in the education of prospective medical professionals. SCGH is home to a Centre for Nursing Education offering a number of services to the nursing staff at SCGH, focusing on career development, education and support in a clinical environment.

The Centre for Nursing Education supports nursing undergraduate programs by facilitating clinical placements within SCGH. A graduate nursing program is offered to registered and enrolled nurses by Sir Charles Gairdner Osborne Park Health Care Group to facilitate a supportive transition from undergraduate study to a clinical setting. Speciality postgraduate nursing programs for staff are available that assist in advanced nursing fields and techniques. Furthermore, a professional development calendar is available throughout the year to provide the opportunity to develop and refresh on skills, or learn new techniques and discover a new healthcare topic.

SCGH partners with the University of Western Australia, Curtin University, the University of Notre Dame and Edith Cowan University in educating health care professionals. There are a number of support systems aimed to support doctors with their workload and their transition from medical school to a clinical environment.

As a hospital recognised in emergency medicine expertise, SCGH has an intradepartmental education program run by emergency physicians who are interested in medical education. Education programs are run to educate medical staff on emergency medicine basics, including ultrasound, toxicology and simulation training.

Other areas of education are embedded within each medical field. Examples include plastic and reconstructive surgery training programs for surgical trainees, interns and resident medical officers, education in med tech services, comprehensive neurosurgery training or registrars and interns, patient treatment information in medical oncology, diabetes education and patient treatment education in medical oncology.

=== Fellowships ===
SCGH offers a range of fellowships. A range of scholarships are offered to nursing and midwifery students studying in Western Australia by the Nursing and Midwifery Office. The scholarships are awarded based on areas of high clinical need and requirements in the current work force.

In partnership with the Raine Medical Research Foundation, the Department of Health offers the Clinician Research Fellowship to encourage researchers to maintain some clinical duties while developing their research capability.

Registrar Research Fellowships are available for clinical professionals aiming to pursue a career in both research and clinical work aiming to contribute to the continuous improvements in a sustainable health system.

=== Volunteering ===
Volunteer opportunities with SCGH require a commitment of at least four hours per week. Volunteer opportunities include: buggy service, driving a buggy around QEIIMC delivering patients from the car park to hospital departments; auxiliary positions, such as operating a lolly trolley and a library trolley that goes around the wards; SolarisCare, which is open to qualified therapists; and the voluntary transport service that drives patients to and from hospital appointments.

=== Charlies Social Club ===
The Charlies Social Club serves as a community and way for staff, volunteers and students at SCGH to connect. Weekly health and fitness activities and events are available, along with member benefits including discounts at selected stores and services.

== Controversy ==
In 2014, workers at SCGH cancelled some surgeries, treatments and diagnostic tests and rescheduled after health service workers and the state government failed to reach agreement over a pay increase. Over 500 workers at SCGH stopped work contributing to industrial action after HSUWA refused to accept a 2.75 per cent increase in staff wages, while politicians were offered a 3.8 per cent pay increase and doctors and nurses were offered a 4 per cent pay increase. The strike resulted in the cancellation of 21 scheduled elective surgeries, and also affected Allied Health outpatient services.

== See also ==
- List of hospitals in Western Australia
