= Queen Elizabeth II Medical Centre =

Medical campus in Perth, Western Australia

Coordinates: 31°58′07″S 115°48′52″E

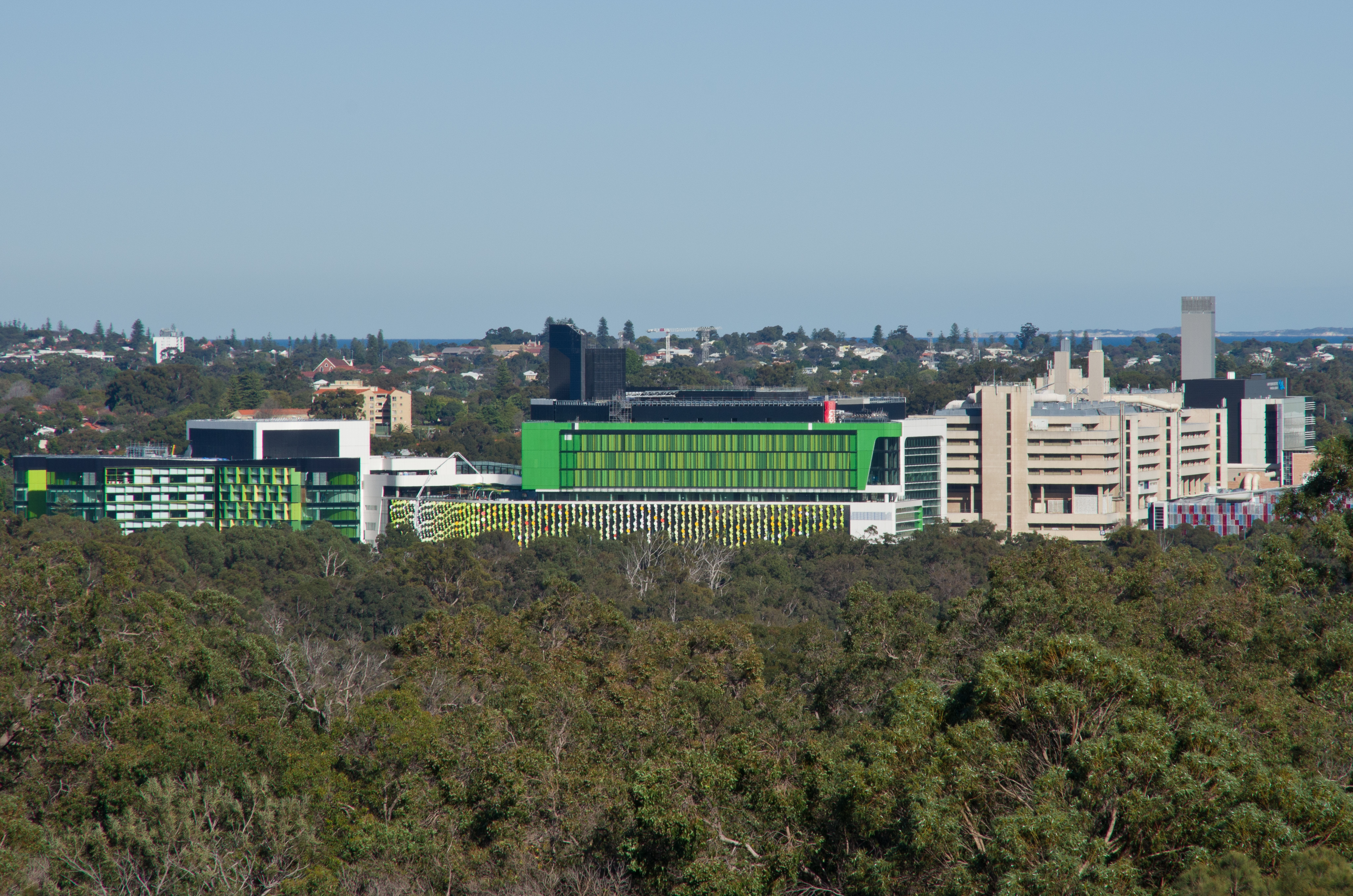
QEII Medical Centre viewed from the DNA Tower in Kings Park

The Queen Elizabeth II Medical Centre (QEIIMC), commonly known as just QEII, is a medical campus in Perth, Western Australia, situated in the suburb of Nedlands directly adjacent to Kings Park. It contains Sir Charles Gairdner Hospital, the Perth Children's Hospital, the Harry Perkins Institute of Medical Research, and various smaller facilities.

The current QEII site was bought by the state government in 1910, and in 1922 a 999-year lease (that is, until the year 2921) was granted to the University of Western Australia (UWA). The land remained largely undeveloped, so in 1953 the land was designated for the construction of a new medical centre with a teaching hospital at its core. The site was originally known as the Perth Medical Centre, but changed its name in 1977 to commemorate the Silver Jubilee of Elizabeth II. A 1966 act of parliament created a separate trust to manage the land, with UWA receiving representation on the board.
