= Kathryn Fagg =

Australian corporate director

Kathryn Fagg AC FTSE

Chair of the CSIRO
- In office 15 October 2021 – 7 March 2025
- Preceded by: David Thodey
- Succeeded by: Ming Long

Personal details
- Born: Kathryn Joy Fagg; July 1961 (age 65)
- Occupation: Engineer and corporate director

Kathryn Joy Fagg (born July 1961) is an Australian chemical engineer and board director. In October 2021, she was appointed to a five-year term as chair of the CSIRO which she concluded in March of 2025.

== Early life and education ==
Kathryn Joy Fagg was born in July 1961 in regional Queensland.

She graduated from the University of Queensland (UQ) in 1982 with a chemical engineering degree, one of six women in a class of 200.

After working for some time as a petroleum engineer, Fagg undertook postgraduate studies in organisational behaviour, earning an M.Com. in Organisation Behaviour from the University of New South Wales (UNSW).

== Career ==
After graduation, Fagg began worked as a petroleum engineer at Esso Australia in oil and gas fields in the Bass Strait, from 1983 to 1989.

After her postgraduate business studies, she moved into management consultancy. Her appointments included consulting with McKinsey & Company, banking with the ANZ Bank, where she was for some time general manager of retail banking in New Zealand, and managing director, banking products for the whole group.

She was then appointed to senior leadership roles at BHP/BlueScope Steel, including President, Australian Building and Logistics Solutions, and President Asia, based in Singapore. She then moved to Linfox (2009–11), where she was president and non-executive director of fast moving consumer goods.

After this, Fagg concentrated on non-executive director roles. She was a non-executive director on the board of the Reserve Bank of Australia from 2013 until May 2018, when she was chair of the Audit Committee. She served on the board of Boral from August 2014 to 2016. She has also been a director of Incitec Pivot and Djerriwarrh Investments.

On 16 December 2019 Fagg was appointed director of the National Australia Bank, a position still current as of April 2024.

In October 2021, she was appointed to a five-year term as chair of the CSIRO, succeeding David Thodey. This term was completed in March 2025, being succeeded by Ming Long.

== Non-corporate activities ==
As of 2014, Fagg was actively involved with Chief Executive Women (CEW), at that time chairing the Thought Leadership Committee and a member of the Scholarship Committee. She was elected president of CEW, to serve a two-year term from November 2016, succeeding Diane Smith-Gander. until 2018.

She was chair of the Melbourne Recital Centre as of 2014 until at least 2016, and chair of Breast Cancer Network Australia in 2016. She has also been a member of World Vision's Business Advisory Council, and chair of Parks Victoria.

She has chaired the Industry and Innovation Forum of the Australian Academy of Technology and Engineering.

As of April 2024 Fagg is chair of Watertrust Australia, a registered charity, at this time.

== Recognition and honours ==
- ?: One of Australia's Top 100 Most Influential Engineers
- ?: and one of Australia's 25 Most Influential Female Engineers
- ?(before 2016): Honorary Doctor of Business, UNSW
- 2013: University of Queensland's inaugural Vice-Chancellor's Alumni Excellence Award
- 2013: Fellow of the Australian Academy of Technology and Engineering
- 2017: Ada Lovelace Medal for Outstanding Woman Engineer
- 2019: Officer of the Order of Australia (AO) in the 2019 Queen's Birthday Honours for "distinguished service to business and finance, to the central banking, logistics and manufacturing sectors, and to women"
- 2025: Companion of the Order of Australia (AC) in the 2025 King's Birthday Honours for "eminent service to business governance, to the banking, finance and investment industry, to public administration, to the not-for-profit sector, and to women."

== Personal ==
Fagg is married to Kevin Altermatt, a strategy management consultant, and has at least one son, Jack. As of 2021 they were living in the Domain precinct of South Yarra, Melbourne.
