= Richard Pestell =

Australian oncologist and endocrinologist

Richard G. Pestell AO FRACP FRCP FRCPI FACP
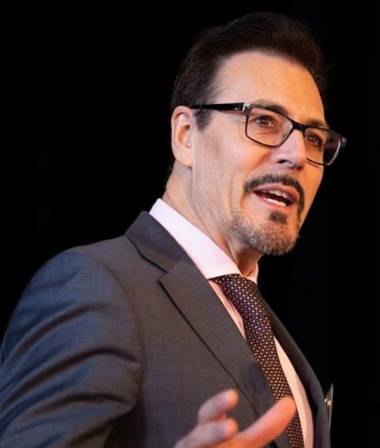
- Born: Perth, Western Australia
- Citizenship: United States, Australia
- Education: New York University; University of Melbourne; University of Western Australia
- Spouse: Anna Pestell
- Children: 3
- Awards: Eric Sussman Prize (2015); Biotechnology Award, Advance Global Australian Awards (2014); RD Wright Medallion, University of Melbourne (2010); Susan G. Komen for the Cure "Light of Life" Award (2010)
- Scientific career
- Fields: Oncology, Endocrinology
- Workplaces: Harvard Medical School; Massachusetts General Hospital; Baruch S. Blumberg Institute; Thomas Jefferson University; Georgetown University Medical Center; Albert Einstein College of Medicine; Xavier University School of Medicine, Aruba

Richard G. Pestell is an Australian American oncologist, endocrinologist and research scientist. Pestell was appointed an Officer of the Order of Australia for distinguished service to medicine and medical education in 2019 by Queen Elizabeth II. He was previously Executive Vice President of Thomas Jefferson University and Director of the Sidney Kimmel Cancer Center of Thomas Jefferson University. He founded six biotechnology companies developing cancer therapy and diagnostics. He is currently Distinguished Professor, Translational Medical Research, and the President of the Pennsylvania Cancer and Regenerative Medicine Research Center at the Baruch S. Blumberg Institute.

== Education ==
A native of Perth, Western Australia, Pestell attended Christ Church Grammar School. He attended the University of Western Australia School of Medicine, receiving his M.B.B.S. He conducted clinical training in internal medicine, oncology and endocrinology. He was awarded the Fellow of the Royal Australian College of Physicians (FRACP) in 1989. He received a Ph.D., under the supervision of Professor Richard Larkins and Professor John Coghlan, in 1991 and M.D. in 1997 from the University of Melbourne. He was the recipient of both the Neal Hamilton Fairley Fellowship, and the Winthrop Fellowship of the Royal Australian College of Physicians. He became a postdoctoral clinical and research fellow with Dr. J. Larry Jameson in medicine at the Massachusetts General Hospital and a postdoctoral research fellow in medicine at Harvard Medical School in 1991.

== Career ==
Pestell was recruited as an Assistant Professor to the Department of Molecular Medicine at Northwestern University's Feinberg School of Medicine in Chicago, Illinois. He became an Associate Professor and Professor in the Departments of Medicine and Developmental and Molecular Biology at the Albert Einstein College of Medicine in New York. Pestell served as Chair of the Division of Endocrine-Dependent Tumor Biology at the then Albert Einstein Cancer Center.

In 2002, Pestell was named Director of the Lombardi Cancer Center, the Francis L. and Charlotte Gragnani Endowed Chair, and Chairman of the Department of Oncology at the Georgetown University Medical Center. During this tenure, he also served as Associate Vice President of the Georgetown University Medical Center, at the Georgetown University School of Medicine. Pestell led the effort for renewal of the National Cancer Institute designation, and supported Dr. Mandelblatt in founding the Capital Breast Care Center with Andrea Jung of the Avon Foundation. In 2003, he was also named President of the US branch of the International Network for Cancer Treatment and Research.

From 2005-2015 Pestell served as Director of Jefferson’s Sidney Kimmel Comprehensive Cancer Center, and Chairman of the Department of Cancer Biology at Thomas Jefferson University Medical Center During this tenure, he also served as Executive Vice President, Thomas Jefferson University (TJU). Pestell led the successful effort for renewal of the National Cancer Institute designation in 2007, then as an expanded consortium Cancer Center to include the Lankenau Institute for Medical Research in 2007 and renewed again to include Drexel University in 2013.

From 2018 Pestell also served as the Dean of a New Medical School to ensure its regulatory compliance and accreditations.

Since 2017, Pestell has served as President, Pennsylvania Cancer Center and Regenerative Medicine Center, and Blumberg Distinguished Professor, Translational Medical Research, Baruch S Blumberg Institute. In January 2019, Pestell was named Vice Chairman of the Board of the CytoDyn, Inc., which acquired his prior company, ProstaGene, in November 2018. As the Chief Medical Officer, he established the company's cancer clinical trial for the use of a CCR5 inhibitor (leronlimab) and FDA fast track designation in May 2019. He exited CytoDyn in July 2019 and is currently member of the Wistar Institute Cancer Center Philadelphia and Blumberg Distinguished Professor.

Pestell was awarded the Eric Susman Prize in 2015 by the Royal Australasian College of Physicians for his contributions to medical research. The prize is awarded annually to a Fellow of the College for an outstanding contribution to knowledge in internal medicine.

Pestell was appointed an Officer of the Order of Australia for service to medicine and medical education in 2019 by Queen Elizabeth II, for “distinguished service to medicine, and to medical education, as a researcher and physician in the fields of endocrinology and oncology”.

== Research ==
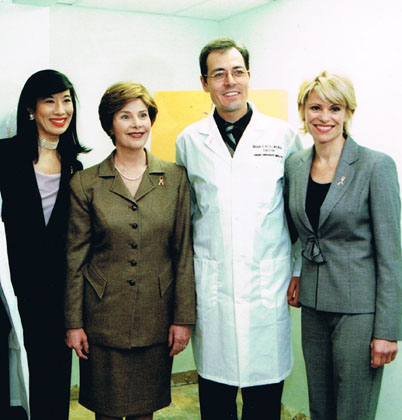
Pestell with Laura Bush, Andrea Jung, and Kathleen Walas of Avon Products, Inc.

There are more than 109,000 citations to Pestell's work. He has an H-index of 161 and an i10 index 490.

Pestell's research has included contributions to understanding of cancer onset and progression including breast and prostate cancer.

=== Cyclin D1 and nuclear receptor biology ===
Pestell’s laboratory showed that nuclear receptors (e.g. estrogen, androgen, PPARγ) can be acetylated, a modification that influences their transcriptional activity and growth control—introducing a new regulatory mechanism in hormone signaling.

=== Cancer stem cell regulation ===
He has identified key genes and pathways (e.g. p21^Cip1, c-Jun, NF-κB, DACH1, CCR5) that govern cancer stem cell expansion in breast cancer, and studied how dysregulation of these contributes to metastasis.

=== CCR5 in cancer metastasis ===
Pestell’s group provided evidence that CCR5 (a chemokine receptor) plays a role in metastasis in breast and prostate cancer, proposing CCR5 inhibitors as potential therapeutic agents. This work helped inform clinical trials of CCR5-targeting agents such as leronlimab in oncology contexts. Beyond discovery science, Pestell has co-founded multiple biotechnology ventures (e.g. LightSeed, ProstaGene, Shenandoah, ioROC, StromaGenesis, EcoGenome) aimed at translating molecular insights into diagnostics and treatments. He served on editorial boards and as a reviewer across many journals and funding bodies globally.

=== CytoDyn / Leronlimab research ===
In 2025, Pestell delivered poster and oral presentations at the AACR Special Conference on Cancer Immunity, reporting results on leronlimab’s potential to convert immunologically “cold” tumors to “hot” ones, in the context of metastatic triple-negative breast cancer and checkpoint inhibitor responsiveness.

=== Institutions and honors ===
Under Pestell’s leadership, the Pennsylvania Cancer and Regenerative Medicine Center aims to integrate cancer biology, regenerative medicine, and translational innovation. In 2019, he was conferred Doctor of Medical Science (honoris causa) by the University of Melbourne and awarded the Order of Australia for his services to medicine and education.

== Professional career ==
In addition to his academic career, Pestell has founded six biotechnology companies focused on cancer therapy and diagnostics.

He founded LightSeed LLC, which develops light-activated gene control technologies for targeted cancer treatment, and EcoGenome LLC, which designs genomic-based diagnostics to identify tumor-specific vulnerabilities.

Pestell also established StromaGenesis, a company developing therapeutics targeting the tumor microenvironment, and ProstaGene, which specialized in prostate cancer diagnostics and treatment. ProstaGene was acquired by CytoDyn in 2018.

In addition, he founded Shenandoah Pharmaceuticals LLC and ioROC LLC, both contributing to the development of novel cancer therapeutics and diagnostic systems.

== Awards and honors ==
- 1975-1981 University Commonwealth Scholarship
- 1976 St George’s College Prize for first place overall Medical School, University of Western Australia
- 1988-1991 National Health and Medical Research Council of Australia (NHMRC), Postgraduate Scholarship
- 1988-1991 Higher Education Contribution Scheme (HECS), Postgraduate Scholarship
- 1990 The Royal Australian College of Physicians, Winthrop Fellowship (1 award given in Australia)
- 1991-1994 Neil Hamilton Fairley NHMRC, Postdoctoral Fellowship
- 1997 NIH Shannon Award
- 1998 - 2002 Irma T. Hirschl Weil Caulier Career Scientist Award
- 2000 Elected Member, American Society for Clinical Investigation
- 2002 Diane Belfer Faculty Scholar in Cancer Research
- 2002 Francis L. and Charlotte Gragnani Endowed Chair, professor with tenure, Georgetown University, Washington, DC
- 2005 Australia Endocrine Society, Keith Harrison Memorial Lecture Prize
- 2007 Elected Fellow, Royal Society of Medicine
- 2008 Doctor Honoris Causa, University of Western Australia
- 2009 Elected Fellow, College of Physicians of Philadelphia
- 2009 Elected Honorary Fellow, American College of Physicians
- 2010 RD Wright Medallion, University of Melbourne
- 2010 Susan G. Komen for the Cure "Light of Life" Award
- 2010 Raine Distinguished Professor
- 2011 Elected Fellow, American Association for the Advancement of Science
- 2014 Biotechnology Award, 2014 Advance Global Australian Awards
- 2015 The Eric Susman Prize Awarded by The Royal Australasian College of Physicians
- 2016 Doctor of Medical Sciences, Honoris Causa, University of Melbourne Australia
- 2016 Member, National Academy of Inventors, Thomas Jefferson University Chapter
- 2016 Jamie Brooke Lieberman Remembrance Award, Susan G. Komen
- 2019 Order of Australia (AO)
- 2022 Elected to Fellowship of Royal College of Physicians of Ireland (FRCPI)
- 2022 Elected to Fellowship of Royal College of Physicians of England (FRCP, London)
- 2024 Elected Member of the Academia Europaea
- 2025 Elected Honorary Member of Hungarian Academy of Science

== Personal life ==
Pestell is married to Anna Pestell and has three children. He is the great-grandson of Albert Green, Minister for Defence under the Scullin Government. son of George Pestell and related to other assorted ancestors.

== Selected publications ==
- Fan, S.; Wang, J.; Yuan, R.; Ma, Y.; Meng, Q.; Erdos, M.R.; Pestell, R.G.; Yuan, F.; Auborn, K.J.; Goldberg, I.D.; Rosen, E.M. (1999). "BRCA1 inhibition of estrogen receptor signaling in transfected cells". Science. 284 (5418): 1354–6. Bibcode:1999Sci...284.1354F. doi:10.1126/science.284.5418.1354. PMID 10334989.
- Bromberg, J.F.; Wrzeszczynska, M.H.; Devgan, G.; Zhao, Y.; Pestell, R.G.; Albanese, C.; Darnell, J.E. Jr. (1999). "Stat3 as an oncogene". Cell. 98 (3): 295–303. doi:10.1016/s0092-8674(00)81959-5. PMID 10458605. S2CID 16304496.
- Tazebay, U.H.; Wapnir, I.L.; Levy, O.; Dohan, O.; Zuckier, L.S.; Zhao, Q.H.; Deng, H.F.; Amenta, P.S.; Fineberg, S.; Pestell, R.G.; Carrasco, N. (2000). "The mammary gland iodide transporter is expressed during lactation and in breast cancer". Nat Med. 6 (8): 871–8. doi:10.1038/78630. PMID 10932223. S2CID 1002246.
- Tanaka, H.; Matsumura, I.; Ezoe, S.; Satoh, Y.; Sakamaki, T.; Albanese, C.; Machii, T.; Pestell, R.G.; Kanakura, Y. (2002). "E2F1 and c-Myc potentiate apoptosis through inhibition of NF-κB activity that facilitates MnSOD-mediated ROS elimination". Mol Cell. 9 (5): 1017–29. doi:10.1016/s1097-2765(02)00522-1. PMID 12049738.
- Huang, E.; Ishida, S.; Pittman, J.; Dressman, H.; Bild, A.; Kloos, M.; D'Amico, M.; Pestell, R.G.; West, M.; Nevins, J.R. (2003). "Gene expression phenotypic models that predict the activity of oncogenic pathways". Nat Genet. 34 (2): 226–30. doi:10.1038/ng1167. PMID 12754511. S2CID 85013774.
- Genander, M.; Halford, M.M.; Xu, N.J.; Eriksson, M.; Yu, Z.; Qiu, Z.; Martling, A.; Greicius, G.; Thakar, S.; Catchpole, T.; Chumley, M.J.; Zdunek, S.; Wang, C.; Holm, T.; Goff, S.P.; Pettersson, S.; Pestell, R.G.; Henkemeyer, M.; Frisen, J. (2009). "Dissociation of EphB2 signaling pathways mediating progenitor cell proliferation and tumor suppression". Cell. 139 (4): 679–92. doi:10.1016/j.cell.2009.08.048. PMC 2786256. PMID 19914164.
