= Sol Trujillo =

American businessman

- Trujillo in 2008
- Born: Solomon Dennis Trujillo; November 17, 1951 (age 74); Cheyenne, Wyoming, U.S.
- Education: University of Wyoming (BBA, MBA)
- Website: Official website

Solomon Dennis "Sol" Trujillo (born November 17, 1951) is an American businessman, global media-communications and technology executive. He was the CEO of Telstra, US West, and Orange S.A., and has held executive positions in United States Federal government and state governments.

Trujillo was a trade policy advisor to both the Clinton and George W. Bush administrations.

== Personal life ==
Trujillo was born in Cheyenne, Wyoming to Solomon and Theresa (née Lujan) Trujillo. Trujillo attended Cheyenne's East High School and the University of Wyoming, where he earned his Bachelor of Business degree (BBus) and an MBA.

In 1973, Trujillo married Corine (née Fresquez) Trujillo. He currently lives with his wife in Dana Point, California, which is between San Diego and Los Angeles, and he has three adult daughters.

Trujillo was awarded an honorary doctorate from the University of Melbourne in 2000.

Trujillo is on several corporate boards in the US, Europe and China, including WPP, Target, Promerica Bank and Silk Road Technologies.

== Career ==
=== AT&T/Mountain Bell/US West ===
Trujillo began his business career in 1974 as an economic forecaster in the Mountain Bell division of AT&T. At 32, Trujillo was selected State Vice-president, and chief executive of Mountain Bell's operations in New Mexico, making him the youngest officer in the history of AT&T.

In 1996, Trujillo was named president of US West. He advanced to president and CEO in 1998, becoming America's first native-born Latino CEO of a Fortune 200 company.

Trujillo stepped down as CEO of US West in 2002, following the company's merger with Qwest Communications CEO Joe Nacchio, citing differences in vision between the two. During his time at the company, Trujillo was credited with shifting US West's reputation as the "smallest local phone network" into one focused on high-speed Internet and other technology, such as Voice over IP.

=== Graviton ===
In November 2000, Trujillo became chairman and CEO of Graviton, a La Jolla-based startup that produced wirelessly-connected sensor technology for public and private applications. He was recruited by director Brook Byers, of Kleiner Perkins Caufield & Byers. In addition to Kleiner Perkins, other investors in the startup, which raised more than $60 million, included Qualcomm, Siemens, Royal Dutch/Shell GroupIn-Q-Tel, and Sun Microsystems.

Trujillo left the company shortly before its sale to Xsilogy, another wireless sensor and monitoring company, for an undisclosed sum.

=== Orange S.A. ===
After two years as a member of the Orange S.A. board of directors, Trujillo was tapped to be CEO of the company in 2003. He was the first American to lead a CAC 40 company.

At Orange, Trujillo pursued, "an aggressive growth strategy," to combat the large debt load that he inherited. This clashed with the business direction of state-owned France Telecom, Orange's parent, which eventually bought out minority shareholders and absorbed the company.

Trujillo stepped down as CEO of Orange in March 2004, having "accomplished his mandate," and returning to the US. Under his leadership, Orange added five million new customers and grew its revenue profit margins by 10 and 7 percent, respectively.

=== Telstra ===
Trujillo was appointed chief executive officer of Telstra Communications, Australia's largest telecommunications and media company, on July 1, 2005. Amid news of his appointment, The Economist named the position "Australia's toughest corporate job," as Trujillo's mandate was to prepare the firm for Australia's largest public offering in history. The firm, formerly Telecom Australia, was originally state-owned, but saw a minority stake sold off between 1997 and 1999, raising about A$30 billion. At the time of Trujillo's appointment, approximately 51.8 percent of the company remained government owned, the sale of which was successfully concluded for A$15.5 billion in 2006.

Telstra's share price had underperformed due to poorly-calculated bids during the tenure of the firm's previous CEO, Ziggy Switkowski, including the purchase of Hong Kong mobile communications operator CSL and the attempted purchase of John Fairfax Holdings, a large Australian newspaper. The state-run telecom business was described as "lumbering," and falling behind its competition prior to its complete privatization, as its fixed-line business was undercut by its rivals internet and mobile services.

Following his appointment, Trujillo announced a five-year turnaround plan based on "principles" to make the company more responsive to shareholder concerns. In addition to trying to streamlining the company's systems and paring down staff, Trujillo sought to upgrade aging networks and systems. This led to the deployment of a nationwide 3G, 850 MHz mobile Internet to replace the then-current CDMA mobile network. The network, built between November 2005 and September 2006, launched in October 2006. The largest and fastest network in the world, the network doubled the volume of total data traffic carried on all of Telstra's wireless networks. After three years on the job, Trujillo was named "CEO of the Year" by Australian Telecom Magazine in recognition of his achievements in the privatization and transformation of Telstra.

Despite its successes, Telstra repeatedly ran into regulatory issues as it tried to grow. In August 2006, a regulatory dispute forced Telstra to abandon a project to build a high-speed fiber-optic network in the country's five largest following a disagreement over how much the company could charge its competitors access to the network. Conscious of his duty to shareholders, Trujillo threatened not to build the network: "My duty is to our shareholders—including 1.6m ordinary Australians. I will only invest where I can earn an economic return."

After a high-profile bid, the company was removed from the bidding process to build a national high-speed broadband network by the Rudd Government. In February 2009, Trujillo announced he would stand down as Telstra's CEO and return to the United States. He was replaced as CEO by David Thodey, formerly head of the government affairs for the company, who insisted that he planned to see out the end of Trujillo's five-year plan.

Trujillo is recognized as a combative CEO who frequently locked horns with Australia's government, but was pivotal in shifting Telstra's position from a government-run monopoly to a more nimble, competitive company.

=== Unlockd ===
Trujillo joined a team of directors at Australian mobile phone startup Unlockd in July 2016. The startup, which raised $12 million in Series A funding, partners with telecommunications companies to display advertisements on consumers' devices in exchange for a discount on their monthly bill.

== Awards and recognition ==
- Honorary Doctorate, Whittier College (2017).
- "National Hero of the Year" award by United States Hispanic Leadership Institute (USHLI) for accomplishments in business and the private sector and contributions as a positive influence and role model for the Latino community (2013).
- NACD Top-100 Directors from the National Association of Corporate Directors (2012)
- "CEO of the Year" by Australian Telecom Magazine, in recognition of his achievements in the privatization and transformation of Telstra (2008).
- Honorary Doctorate, University of Colorado (2002).
- Corporate Recognition Award from A Better Chance, in recognition of his commitment to supporting and advancing educational opportunities for students of color (2000).
- Honorary Doctorate, University of Wyoming (2000).
- "Ronald H. Brown Corporate Bridge Builder Award" by President Clinton for creating opportunities for women and minorities (1999).
