= Australian National Business Schools =

The Australian National Business School consortium is a group of six Australian business schools sharing a common curriculum. They include:

- University of Western Australia
- University of Wollongong
- University of Tasmania
- Griffith University
- Deakin University
- University of Canberra
