= Diane Smith-Gander =

Australian business executive (born 1957)

Diane Lee Smith-Gander AO (born November 1957) is an Australian business executive. She holds and has held a number of governance positions on various boards, and is known for her championing of gender equity. She was appointed chancellor of the University of Western Australia (UWA) for a three-year term beginning in 2025, where she is also an adjunct professor of corporate governance and previously chaired the advisory board of the university's Business School. Other roles include as chair of the inaugural Nominations Committee for the World Anti-Doping Agency.

== Early life and education ==
Diane Lee Smith-Gander was born in November 1957 and grew up in Alfred Cove, a suburb of Perth, Western Australia. She attended Melville Senior High School. Her mother, Betty, was a teacher and taught accounting.

She began studying science at UWA, but after her second year changed to economics. She also holds an MBA from the University of Sydney.

She played basketball for Western Australia as a junior and senior, and played in the leagues that preceded the Women's National Basketball League. She was first involved in her local basketball association, and later as a member of the WA Basketball Association tribunal.

Smith-Gander left Perth around 1994.

== Career ==
She started her career in banking, working in banking operations, technology solutions, and change management roles for Westpac. She also worked in the United States and Hong Kong for the international management company McKinsey & Co, becoming a partner in that firm.

She has held a range of governance positions, including the role of commissioner of Tourism Western Australia, non-executive director of CBH Group, and deputy chair of NBN Co. In 2007 she became a full-time company director.

Since September 2019 she has chaired the inaugural Nominations Committee for the World Anti-Doping Agency, which was created in order to ensure that the right people are recruited to serve in senior governance roles within the organisation.

As of 2024 Smith-Gander is on the advisory board of Whiteoak, as well as chair of Zip Co Limited (non-executive, since 2021), DDH1, HBF Health and national chair of CEDA (Committee for Economic Development of Australia) since 2020. In 2023 she became a non-executive director of Perenti, becoming chair in 2024. The CEDA and UWA Business School roles are served pro bono.

As of 2024 she is also a professor of corporate governance at UWA, and on her appointment in 2019, became the first woman to chair the advisory board of the university's Business School. In June 2024, Smith-Gander was selected to succeed Robert French as chancellor of UWA, beginning her term at the start of 2025. In October 2024, the UWA Student Guild voted to express no confidence in Smith-Gander “for her personal links to apartheid Israel and her opposition to the anti-genocide Palestine solidarity movement.” She was sworn into the role in February 2025, making her the first female chancellor in the university's history.

== Other roles and activities ==
Smith-Gander is an advocate for gender equity and has written several articles in the Australian Financial Review.

She chaired the Australian Sports Drug Agency in the lead-up to the Sydney Olympics in 2000, and was then on the steering committee aiming at the unification of basketball during turbulent times in 2008. She became a member of the board of Basketball Australia, and was later appointed chair.

She was elected president of Chief Executive Women in November 2014, effective 1 January 2015.

She also serves pro bono as deputy chair of the council for Methodist Ladies' College (MLC).

In November 2023, during the Gaza war, she wrote an opinion piece explaining why she signed a petition, along with 600 other business and community leaders, "Say no to antisemitism". In it, she says that "There is no place for hatred in Australia" And 'Condemning antisemitism doesn't make me a cheerleader or apologist for everything that happens in Israel. There are things that should be changed. I see Israel as wonderful, challenging, confronting and inspiring in equal measure'.

She additionally compared the 'open door policy' of Israel creating a 'vibrant start-up nation' with Australia's reduction in international students. Commending 'the role that the Israeli Defense Forces play in talent identification and by the way they nurture lifelong networks'.

== Recognition and awards ==
- Fellow, Australian Institute of Company Directors
- Fellow, Governance Institute of Australia (GIA)
- 2015: Honorary doctorate of economics from UWA
- 2017: GIA President's Award for exceptional service
- 2018: Business Award in the West Australian of the Year Awards, "in recognition of her contribution to business in the state and her advocacy for gender equity"
- 2019: Officer of the Order of Australia (AO) in recognition of her "distinguished service to business, to women's engagement in executive roles, to gender equality, and to the community", in the 2019 Queen's Birthday Honours
