= Chief Executive Women =

Australian advocacy organisation

Chief Executive Women (CEW) is an Australian organisation that supports women entrepreneurs and those in leadership positions and those aspiring to be senior executives. It provides a network of women in these positions, as well as funding leadership scholarships. It also lobbies government on issues affecting such issues as the gender pay gap.

== History ==
The organisation began in Victoria in 1985 as an offshoot of Women Chiefs of Enterprises International (WCEI), or (Les Femmes Chefs D'Enterprises Mondiales, or FCEM), which was founded in Paris, France, in 1945. The formation of both groups was inspired by the need to mentor and support women entrepreneurs and in senior roles in organisations, and those to aspire to either. The CEW wanted to get a fairer deal for women in Australia, and to provide a network for sharing experiences with each other.

WCEI asked Barbara Cail AO, then the publisher of Portfolio Magazine, to set up a branch in New South Wales, which she did by selecting a group of 18 women. Cail became founding president, and widened the scope of the FCEM objectives, suggesting awareness-raising of women's business capabilities, which at that point were barely acknowledged, partly by organising lunches with male business leaders. Wendy McCarthy AO and Bonnie Boezeman AO were founding members.

By 1991 the group was active and energetic and felt the need to expand. During the first ten years, one of the most impactful objectives and achievements was to provide an annual scholarship to aspiring women leaders, usually to undertake a Master of Business Administration. Lunches were held with captains of industry such as Bob Joss.

In the mid-1990s CEW made a submission to the Karpin Inquiry (Industry Taskforce on Leadership and Management Skills, Enterprising Nation: Renewing Australia's Managers to Meet the Challenge of the Asia-Pacific Century, Canberra: AGPS, 1995) on women and diversity in management and leadership in the next century.

In 2023, the independent creative agency Now We Collide began a partnership with CEW. Now We Collide is engaged to rebrand the annual CEW leadership summit, with the 2023 event called "Agenda 2033", to signal what must be done to hasten the current slow pace of change to fast-track the movement towards equality for women. Speakers at the 2023 summit included Taryn Brumfitt (2023 Australian of the Year), along with other influential leaders such as Macquarie Group CEO Shemara Wikramanayake, Coles CEO Leah Weckert, and Aboriginal engagement leader Kaylee Anderson, Victorian director of the National Aboriginal and Torres Strait Islander Women's Alliance as of 2024.

== Description ==
CEW supports women entrepreneurs and those in leadership positions and those aspiring to be senior executives. It provides a network of women in these positions, as well as funding leadership scholarships. CEW encompasses all sectors of employment, including corporate, public service, academic, and not-for-profit. It is "an exclusive organisation by choice", in which members are bound to contribute to the overall advancement of women leaders. As of 2024 there are more than 1000 members.

=== People and governance ===
The organisation has six full-time employees and eight part-time employees. It has been registered as a charity by the ACNC since 2015. Lisa Annese has been CEO of CEW since January 2025.

Helen Conway was appointed 20th president of CEW in July 2025, and remains president as of September 2025.

Past presidents include:

- Barbara Cail AO (1985–1989)
- Imelda Roche AO
- Ita Buttrose AC OBE
- Wendy McCarthy AO
- Helen Lynch AM
- Sandra Yates AO
- The Hon. Annabelle Bennett AC SC
- Karen Wilson
- Diane Grady AO
- Jillian Broadbent AC
- Catherine Livingstone AO
- Naseema Sparks AM
- Belinda Hutchinson AC
- Christine Christian AO
- Diane Smith-Gander AO
- Kathryn Fagg AO
- Sue Morphet
- Sam Mostyn AO (Governor-General of Australia from 1 July 2024)
- Susan Lloyd-Hurwitz

== Programs and functions ==
The main functions and operations are focused on the CEW Scholarships and CEW Leaders Programs.

In 2021, the ARA CEW Women Leaders in Retail Scholarship Program was established, in collaboration with the Australian Retailers Association (ARA). The program was announced at the annual ARA International Women's Day lunch by ARA CEO Paul Zahra. This provides the opportunity for women working in a mid to senior executive role in the retail sector to study at the Harvard Business School in Boston, Massachusetts, in the US. The inaugural winner of the scholarship in 2022 was Wesfarmers finance general manager Virginia Lead, with Coles GM of non-food business unit Debra Galle winning it in 2023.

In 2022 CEW partnered with Jane Hansen AO to create two new scholarships for women who lead in the arts community: the Hansen Executive Leader CEW Scholarship and the Hansen CEW Leaders Program for the Arts Scholarships. The former is for one recipient, to study a leadership course of their choice anywhere in the world, while the latter offers five recipients to participate in the CEW Leaders Program.

CEW also analyses data created by the federal government's Workplace Gender Equality Agency (WGEA) each year, and makes submissions to parliament on the gender pay gap and related issues.

In recent years it has put the spotlight on the untapped resources in migrant women, calling on leaders to examine their organisations' cultural and racial diversity and stressing the value of having diverse teams. It also committed to increasing its own data-gathering within its membership, and setting meaningful targets.

== Publications ==
In July 2023 CEW published a report called Unlocking Leadership: Conversations on Gender and Race in Corporate Australia 2023.

== See also ==
- C-suite
