= Susan Lloyd-Hurwitz =

Australian businesswoman

Susan Lloyd-Hurwitz AM
- Education: University of Sydney; INSEAD
- Occupation: Chief executive
- Known for: New South Wales Business Woman of the Year (2014)

Susan Lloyd-Hurwitz is an Australian businesswoman and chief executive working in real estate funds management and property development.

== Early life and education ==
Susan Lloyd-Hurwitz holds a Bachelor of Arts (Hons) from the University of Sydney and completed an MBA (Distinction) from INSEAD, France, in 1994.

== Career ==
Lloyd-Hurwitz has held the position of managing director at LaSalle Investment Management as well as senior positions at MGPA, Macquarie Group and Lend Lease Corporation, and worked in Australia, the US and Europe. In 2012 she was appointed chief executive officer and managing director of the real estate company Mirvac. In February 2021 she joined the board of the Business Council of Australia.

She began a four-year term as Fellow of the Senate of the University of Sydney in June 2025, also serving as chair of the Building and Estates Committee.

=== Other roles ===
Lloyd-Hurwitz was appointed 19th president of Chief Executive Women at the AGM in November 2022, and remaining in that role until June 2025.

== Recognition ==
In 2014 Lloyd-Hurwitz was named New South Wales Business Woman of the Year as well as Telstra Business Woman of the Year for the private and corporate sector. She was appointed a Member of the Order of Australia in the 2025 King's Birthday Honours for "significant service to the property sector through executive roles".
