= Belinda Hutchinson =

Australian businessperson, accountant and philanthropist (born 1953)

Belinda Hutchinson AC FRSN

18th Chancellor of the University of Sydney
- In office 4 February 2013 – 2024
- Preceded by: Dame Marie Bashir
- Succeeded by: David Thodey

Personal details
- Born: August 1953 (age 73)
- Education: University of Sydney
- Profession: University chancellor
- Website: www.sydney.edu.au/about-us/governance-and-structure/governance/chancellor.html

Belinda Jane Hutchinson (born August 1953) is an Australian businessperson, accountant, and philanthropist.

== Early life and education ==
Belinda Jane Hutchinson was born in August 1953.

Hutchinson graduated from the University of Sydney with a Bachelor of Economics degree in 1976.

Hutchinson trained as a chartered accountant in Sydney, while working.

== Career ==
Hutchinson worked as an accountant for seven years at Arthur Andersen, which included three years in the United States. She then took up a post in the project finance division of Citibank in Sydney. She stayed at Citibank for 11 years, also working in corporate finance. Macquarie Group, a client of Citibank invited her to join its advisory business, and she later created its Equity Capital Markets division.

During the 1990s she worked part-time to accommodate her family duties, and did consulting work at Macquarie. During this period she was invited to serve as non-executive director on the boards of renewable energy supplier Snowy Hydro Trading, Crane Group, and EnergyAustralia. Later, she became a member of the boards of Telstra and Coles Myer.

She then took up a more challenging position, becoming chair of QBE Insurance around 2011, when the insurance industry was experiencing a turbulent time. She remained at QBE until 2014.

Hutchinson was appointed chancellor of the University of Sydney in 2013. In August 2015 she was made chair of Thales Australia, the local branch of a French arms manufacturer. In July 2017 the University of Sydney created a memorandum of understanding with Thales "to work closely together over the next five years to develop new technologies and capabilities". The university says that Hutchinson had no part in the memorandum of understanding. In June 2023, she became a non-executive director of the board.

In December 2016, the university senate reappointed Hutchinson for a second term as chancellor. In May 2020, the university senate reappointed Hutchinson for a third term as chancellor. On 11 March 2024, it was announced that Hutchinson would be stepping down from the role, having reached 12-year limit of the University Senate, which elected David Thodey as her replacement.

On 12 April 2018 Hutchinson was appointed as a non-executive director to the Qantas board (still active as of April 2024).

== Other roles ==
Hutchinson has served as president of the council of the State Library of New South Wales since (board member since 1996, still active as of April 2024).

She was president of Chief Executive Women, from 2011 to 2012. of which she remains a member.

She has served as chair of Future Generation Global (until 2021) and QBE Insurance Group, and as director on the boards of AGL Energy (until 2018), St Vincent's Health Australia, TAB, and Sydney Water.

She has been a board member of the Centre for Independent Studies since 2010 (still active as of April 2024).

== Philanthropy ==
Hutchinson strives to develop a culture of philanthropy. As of 2024 she is a non-executive member of the Australian Philanthropic Services, and is a trustee of the St Vincent's Curran Foundation. Her family has a foundation that supports a number of community-based projects, such as work done by the Hunger Project in Malawi.

== Honours ==
- ?: Fellow of the Institute of Chartered Accountants
- ?: Fellow of the Australian Institute of Company Directors
- 2012: University of Sydney Alumni Award for professional achievement
- 2019: Fellow of the Royal Society of New South Wales
- 2007: Member of the Order of Australia in the 2007 Queen's Birthday Honours
- 2020: Companion of the Order of Australia in the 2020 Queen's Birthday Honours, for "eminent service to business, to tertiary education and scientific research, and through philanthropic endeavours to address social disadvantage"

== Personal life ==
Hutchinson had children in the 1990s.

Academic offices
Preceded by Marie Bashir	Chancellor of the University of Sydney; 2013–2024	Succeeded by David Thodey
