= David Thodey =

Australian businessman (born 1954)

David Thodey AO FTSE
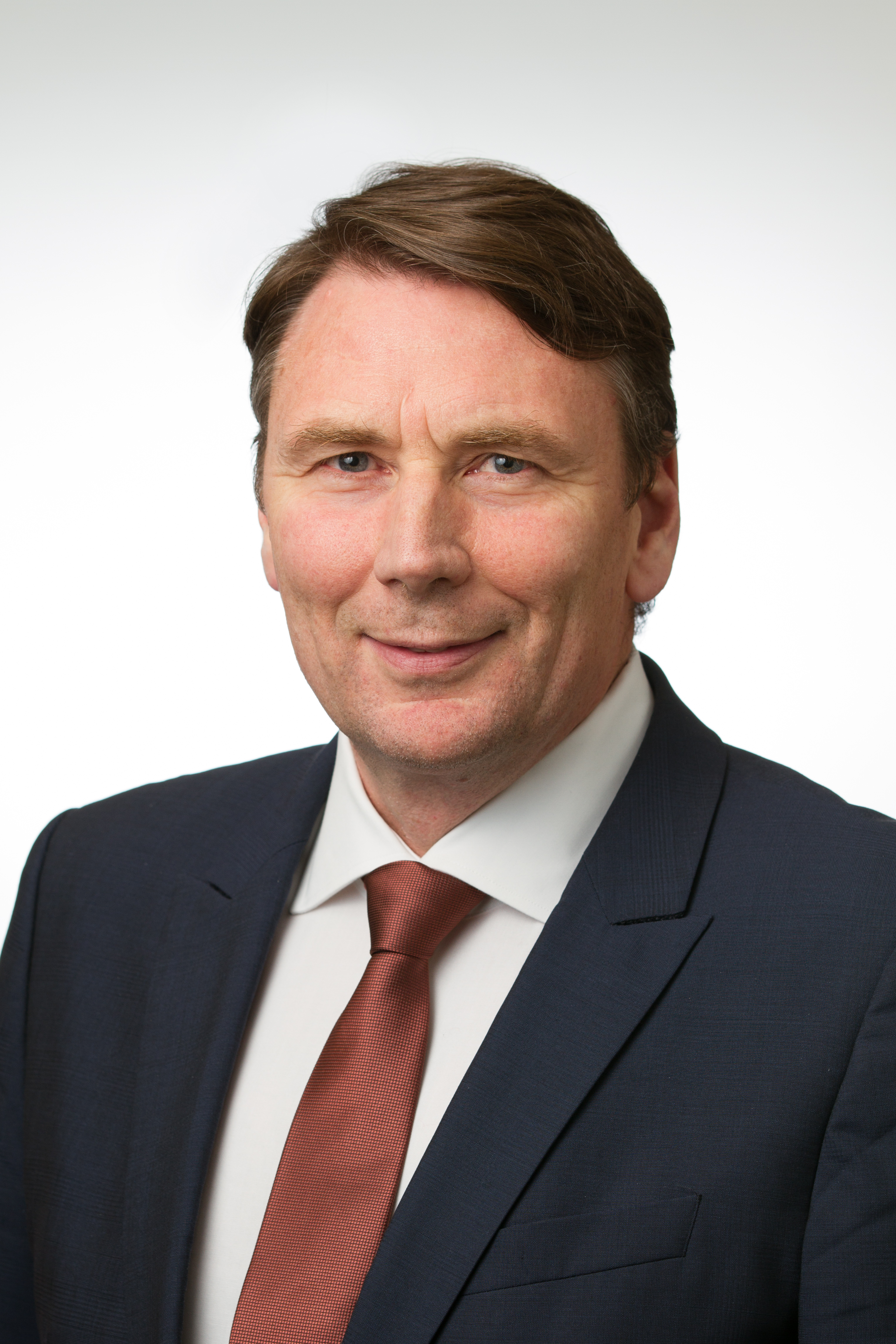
- Thodey in February 2012

19th Chancellor of the University of Sydney
- Incumbent
- Assumed office 7 February 2024
- Preceded by: Belinda Hutchinson

Chairman of the CSIRO
- In office 15 October 2015 – 14 October 2021
- Preceded by: Simon McKeon
- Succeeded by: Kathryn Fagg

Chief Executive of Telstra
- In office 15 May 2009 – April 2015
- Preceded by: Solomon Trujillo
- Succeeded by: Andy Penn

Personal details
- Born: David Ingle Thodey; 14 May 1954 (age 72) Perth, Western Australia
- Education: Victoria University of Wellington; Northwestern University

David Ingle Thodey (born 14 May 1954) is an Australian businessman who is a former chief executive officer of Telstra and current chairman of accounting software company Xero. He became chancellor of the University of Sydney in July 2024.

== Early life and education ==
Thodey was born in Perth, Western Australia. He was educated at Nelson College in New Zealand from 1967 to 1971 and holds a Bachelor of Arts in Anthropology and English from Victoria University of Wellington. Thodey attended the Kellogg School of Management postgraduate general management program at Northwestern University in Chicago.

== Career ==
Thodey held several senior executive positions in marketing and sales within IBM Australia/New Zealand and across IBM Asia Pacific, including holding the position of managing director for Australia between 1999 and 2000.

Thodey joined Telstra in April 2001. He became chief executive officer of Telstra in May 2009. Thodey retired from his position at Telstra in April 2015.

Thodey was appointed chair of the CSIRO Board, with effect from November 2015. He also became the chairman of Xero in 2020, and Ramsay Health Care.

In May 2018, the then Prime Minister Malcolm Turnbull announced an independent review of the Australian Public Service as a whole, to be chaired by Thodey. The review is to produce “an ambitious program of transformational reforms to ensure the APS is fit-for-purpose for the coming decades, and to guide and accelerate future reform activities”. The review was completed in 2019. It included 40 recommendations. In its response, the government fully agreed to 15 of the recommendations, agreed in part to 20, noted two and rejected three.

In March 2024, the University of Sydney named Thodey as its new chancellor, effective from July that year. He will succeed Belinda Hutchinson, who held that position for more than 11 years.

== Recognition ==
In 2017 Australia Day Honours, Thodey was appointed an Officer of the Order of Australia (AO) "for distinguished service to business, notably to the telecommunications and information technology sectors, to the promotion of ethical leadership and workplace diversity, and to basketball".

He has been presented with three honorary doctoral degrees: an Honorary Doctor of Science from Deakin University in 2015 "for distinguished service in the science and technological community", an Honorary Doctorate in Business from the University of Technology Sydney and a Doctor of Business (honoris causa) from the University of Sydney in 2023 "for his contributions to business, telecommunications and public service".

Academic offices
Preceded by Belinda Hutchinson	Chancellor of the University of Sydney; 2024–present	Incumbent
