= University of Western Australia Business School =

University faculty

Coordinates: 31.985973°S 115.820916°E

The University of Western Australia Business School
- Type: Public
- Established: 1911
- Dean: Professor Peter Robertson
- Academic staff: 160
- Students: 4,929
- Location: Perth, Western Australia, Australia
- Website: business.uwa.edu.au

The University of Western Australia Business School is a business school at The University of Western Australia (UWA). UWA first began teaching Economics in 1912, and the Business School is now home to over 4,929 students. The school has four disciplines: Accounting and Finance; Economics; Management and Organisations; and Marketing.

The School delivers undergraduate, postgraduate, and higher degrees by research and coursework programs and remains active in business research. The School is the only university in Western Australia to hold both the European Quality Improvement System (EQUIS) accreditation, and Association to Advance Collegiate Schools of Business (AACSB) accreditation.

== Profile ==
The Business School's faculty comprises approximately 160 academic and professional staff, with 85 per cent of academics holding a PhD or equivalent degree.

There are over 5,700 students enrolled in the School; of these, 80 per cent are undergraduates, 18 per cent are completing a postgraduate degree by coursework, and 2 per cent are pursuing a higher degree by research.

A number of corporate companies provide research chairs and fellows, visiting professor programs, scholarships and prizes to the Business School.

The Business School's "Tomorrow Starts Here" fundraising campaign raised $25 million, and was named a state winner in the Fundraising Institute Australia's 2011 National Awards for Excellence in Fundraising raising.

== Campus ==
The Business School is situated on UWA's main Crawley campus in Perth, Western Australia. The UWA Business School was recently named one of the 50 most beautiful business school campuses in the world by MBA Programs.org.

Located next to the Matilda Bay Reserve on the Swan River and at the south end of the University campus, the $50 million Business School building was opened in May 2009. The building was designed by Woods Bagot.

== Accreditations ==
The Business School received accreditation from the European Quality Improvement System (EQUIS) in 2008 and Association to Advance Collegiate Schools of Business (AACSB) in 2011.

== Courses ==
Undergraduate

Majors in Accounting, Business Law, Business Economics, Finance, Human Resource Management, Management, Marketing, and Work and Employment Relations are taught predominantly through the Business School.

Honours

Students who achieve a required standard can continue to focus on their chosen major while developing research skills through the Honours program, which consists of one more year of study.

Postgraduate

The School's postgraduate courses include the Master of Business Administration, Master of Commerce, and Master of Professional Accounting and specialised degrees in marketing, human resource management and employment relations, economics, business information management, and social impact.

MBA

Established in 1973, the UWA's MBA is the oldest in Western Australia. It has produced over 3,000 management graduates. According to the 2011 Good Universities Guide, the Business School's MBA program has a five-star rating for graduate salaries, getting a job, corporate links, and management faculty size, and in 2009 was ranked seventh in Australia in the Australian Financial Review BOSS MBA rankings.

Higher degrees by research

The Business School offers higher degrees by research, either through the master's degree by research programs or professional doctorate programs such as the Doctor of Philosophy (PhD). Research students work closely with a supervisor on a specific topic to produce a dissertation of significant academic originality.

== Business School Board ==
The Business School Board is tasked with providing leadership to the School. It comprises the Dean, Deputy Dean, and six to ten persons actively engaged in industries, professions, community, or government activities relevant to the work of the Faculty. These members are appointed by the Vice-Chancellor on the recommendation of the Dean and the Chair. The Chair is elected annually by and from the external members of the Board and meetings are held at least twice a year.

== Notable graduates ==
Notable alumni of the UWA Business School include:

- Mark Barnaba, co-founder, Azure Capital, Chair of Macquarie Group Western Australia, Western Power and Edge Employment Solutions, Non-Executive Director, Fortescue Metals Group Ltd
- Colin Barnett, Premier of Western Australia
- Boediono, Vice-President, Indonesia
- Michael Chaney AO, UWA Chancellor, Chairman of National Australia Bank, Woodside Petroleum and Gresham Partners
- Richard Court AC, former Premier, Western Australia
- Andrew Forrest, Billionaire founder of West Australian iron ore miner Fortescue Metals Group
- Darren Glass, MBA class of 2015 and former captain of the West Coast Eagles
- Richard Goyder, Managing Director and CEO, Wesfarmers
- John Willinge, CEO Alverstoke Group LLC

== See also ==
- University of Western Australia
- List of University of Western Australia people
- Official Openings by the Monarch in Australia

== Notes ==
- "What is EQUIS?"
- "TISCOnline"
- "WESTERN AUSTRALIAN RHODES SCHOLARS" (Archived)
- "Students"
- "Benchmarking & Stats"
- "University of western australia | Top Universities"
