= University of Western Australia =

Public university in Crawley, Western Australia, Australia

- Coat of arms
- Motto: Seek Wisdom
- Type: Public research university
- Established: 16 February 1911; 115 years ago
- Accreditation: TEQSA
- Affiliations: Group of Eight (Go8)
- Academic affiliations: ACU; UA
- Budget: A$1.04B (2023)
- Visitor: Governor of Western Australia (ex officio)
- Chancellor: Diane Smith-Gander
- Vice-Chancellor: Amit Chakma
- Faculty: 1,702 (2023)
- Administrative staff: 2,093 (2023)
- Total staff: 3,795 (2023)
- Students: 29,426 (2023)
- Undergraduates: 18,792 (2023)
- Postgraduates: 8,740 coursework (2023); 1,894 research (2023)
- Location: 35 Stirling Highway, Crawley, Western Australia, 6009, Australia; 31°58′49″S 115°49′07″E
- Campus: 300 ha (741.3 acres); Suburban and regional with multiple sites
- Colours: Blue Gold
- Sporting affiliations: UniSport; EAEN; UBL
- Mascot: Laurence the Peacock
- Website: www.uwa.edu.au

The University of Western Australia (UWA) is a public research university in Crawley, Western Australia, Australia. UWA was established in 1911 by an act of the Parliament of Western Australia.

The university is classed as one of the "sandstone universities", an informal designation given to the oldest university in each state. It is a member of the Group of Eight.

== History ==
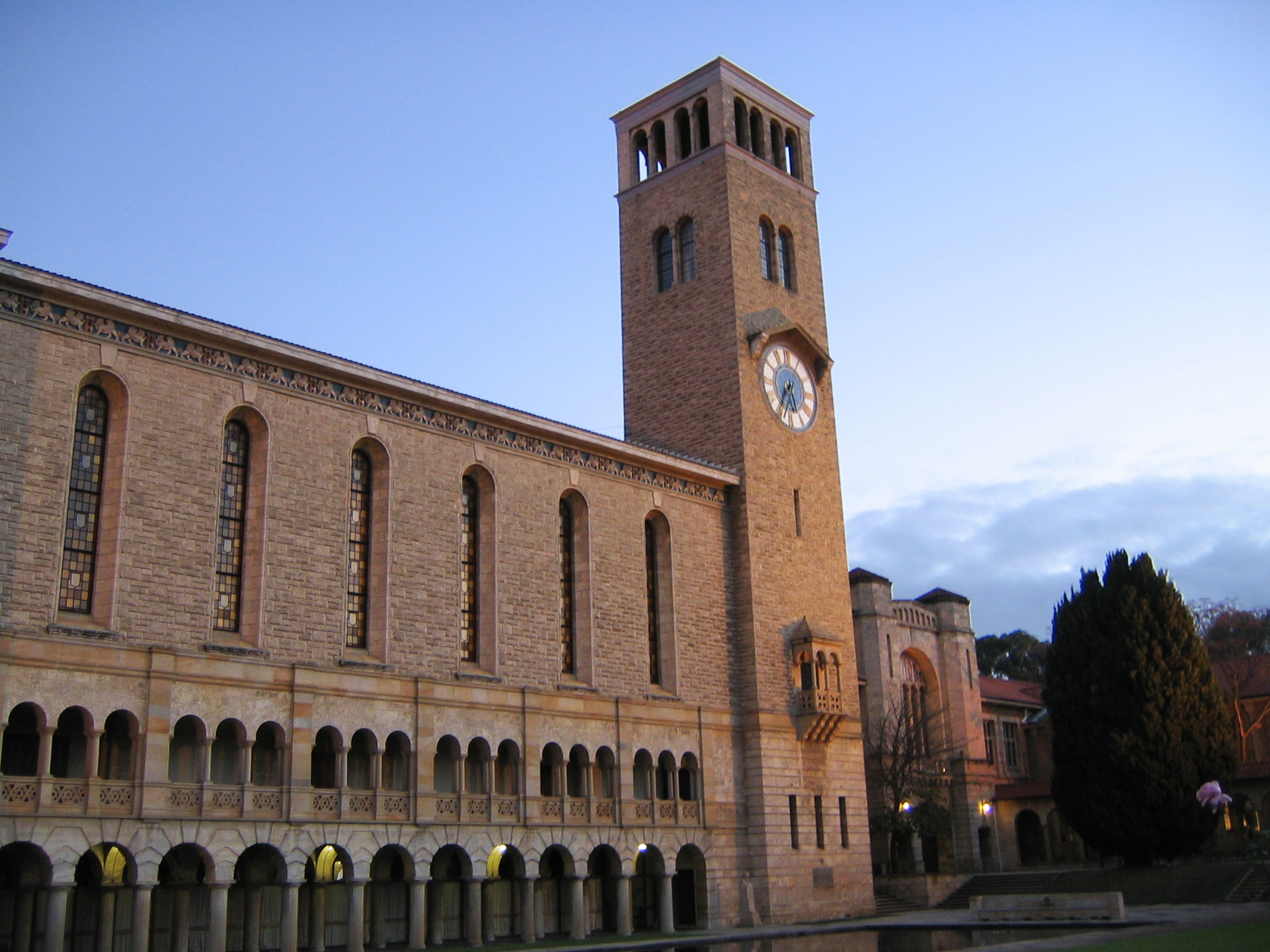
Winthrop Hall, a prominent landmark on the main campus

The university was established by the University of Western Australia Act 1911 following the tabling of proposals by a royal commission in September 1910. The original campus, which received its first students in March 1913, was on Irwin Street in the centre of Perth, and consisted of several buildings between Hay Street and St Georges Terrace. Irwin Street was also known as Tin Pan Alley, as many buildings had corrugated iron roofs. These buildings served as the university campus until 1932, when the campus relocated to its present-day site in Crawley.

The founding chancellor, John Winthrop Hackett, died in 1916, and bequeathed property which, after being carefully managed for ten years, yielded £425,000, equivalent to A$38.2 million in 2022, to the university, a far larger sum than expected. This allowed the construction of the main buildings. Many university buildings and landmarks bear his name, including Winthrop Hall and Hackett Hall. In addition, his bequest funded many scholarships, because he did not wish eager students to be deterred from studying because they could not afford to do so.

During UWA's first decade there was controversy about whether the policy of free education was compatible with high expenditure on professorial chairs and faculties. An "old student" publicised his concern in 1921 that there were 13 faculties serving only 280 students.

A remnant of the original buildings survives to this day in the form of the Irwin Street Building, so called after its former location. In the 1930s it was transported to the new campus and served a number of uses until its 1987 restoration funded by convocation, after which it was moved across campus to James Oval. Since then, the northern end of the building has accommodated the convocation council meeting room while the remainder is used for change rooms and meeting rooms as part of the cricket pavilion. The building has been heritage-listed by both the National Trust and the Australian Heritage Council.

Architect Rodney Alsop won the 1932 bronze medal by the Royal Institute of British Architects for Winthrop Hall. Those who knew him before his death, which occurred later that year, reported that Alsop had thought of little else but the Hackett Memorial buildings, including Winthrop Hall, for six years, and considered the buildings his life's greatest achievement.

The university introduced the Doctorate of Philosophy degree in 1946 and made its first award in October 1950 to Warwick Bottomley for his research of the chemistry of native plants in Western Australia. The university introduced a Bachelor of Philosophy program in 2013.

In October 2026 the Cook Government announced it was developing a business case to merge the Uinversity of Western Australia with Curtin University and Murdoch University.

== Campus ==
Designations

Western Australia Heritage Register
- Official name: Hackett Memorial Buildings
- Type: State Registered Place
- Designated: 4 April 1996
- Reference no.: 3519

Western Australia Heritage Register
- Official name: Park Avenue Building
- Type: State Registered Place
- Designated: 28 June 1996
- Reference no.: 3545

Western Australia Heritage Register
- Official name: Sunken Garden
- Type: State Registered Place
- Designated: 28 June 1996
- Reference no.: 19952

UWA is one of the largest landowners in Perth as a result of government and private bequests, and is constantly expanding its infrastructure. Developments in the last two decades include the $22 million University Club, opened in June 2005, and the UWA Watersports Complex, opened in August 2005. In September 2005 UWA opened its $64 million Molecular and Chemical Sciences building. In 2008, a $31 million Business School building opened. In 2014, a $9 million new CO_{2} research facility was completed, providing modern facilities for carbon research. The Indian Ocean Marine Research Centre, a $62 million research facility on campus, was completed in 2016. The Centre for Integrative Bee Research (CIBER) is located on the Crawley campus in Perth. CIBER conducts basic scientific research into honeybee reproduction, immunity and ecology and aligns its work with the needs of industrial and governmental partners.

Centre for Integrative Bee Research

=== Arts and cultural facilities ===
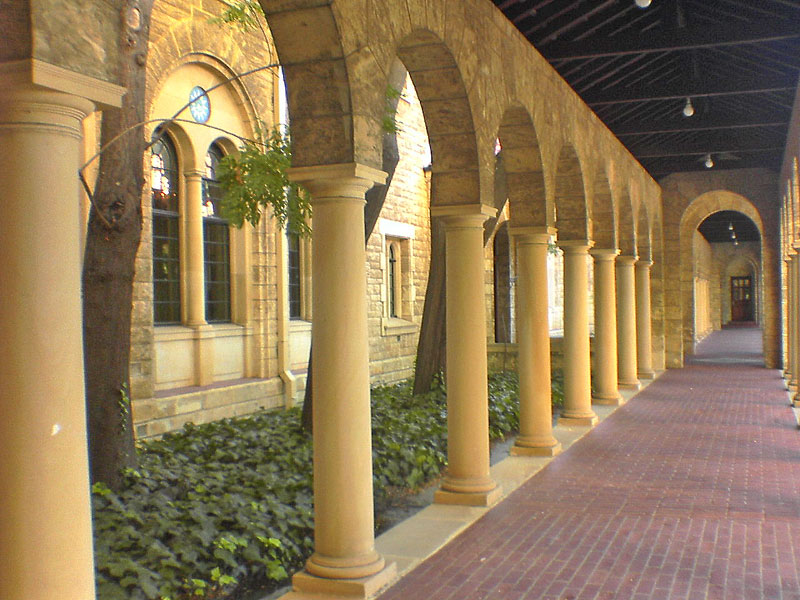
Limestone arches are a prominent feature along the older undercover walkways.

The 65-hectare (160-acre) Crawley campus sits at the Swan River, about 5 kilometres (3.1 mi) west of the Perth central business district. Many of the buildings are coastal limestone and Donnybrook sandstone, including the large, iconic Winthrop Hall, with its Romanesque Revival architecture.

The Arts Faculty building (first occupied in 1964) encompasses the New Fortune Theatre. This open-air venue was built to celebrate Shakespeare's 400th anniversary, at the time the only replica in the world of the original Elizabethan Fortune Theatre, and used for 1964 Perth Festival performances. Since then it has hosted regular performances of Shakespeare's plays co-produced by the Graduate Dramatic Society. and the University Dramatic Society. The venue is also home to a family of peafowl donated to the university by the Perth Zoo in 1975 after a gift by Laurence Brodie-Hall.

The university's cultural precinct is in the northern part of the Crawley campus. Other performance venues include the Octagon and Dolphin Theatres and Somerville Auditorium, the Winthrop Hall, Sunken Garden, Undercroft and Tropical Grove, which play host to a range of theatre and musical performances, including during the Perth Festival.

The UWA Conservatorium of Music hosts many concerts each year by students and visiting artists, including series of free lunchtime concerts.

The Berndt Museum of Anthropology, in the Lawrence Wilson Art Gallery (formerly on the ground floor of the Social Sciences Building), contains one of the most significant collections of Aboriginal and Torres Strait Islander cultural material in the world. Its Asian and Melanesian collections are also of strong interest. It was established in 1976 by Ronald and Catherine Berndt.

=== Libraries ===
Reid Library

The University of Western Australia has five libraries on campus, including the architecturally recognised Reid Library building, the largest of the five. The other libraries are the Barry J Marshall Library (Biological and Physical Sciences, Mathematics, Psychology and Geography); the J Robin Warren Library (Medical and Dental); the Beasley Law Library; and the Education, Fine Arts and Architecture Library.

=== Offsite locations ===
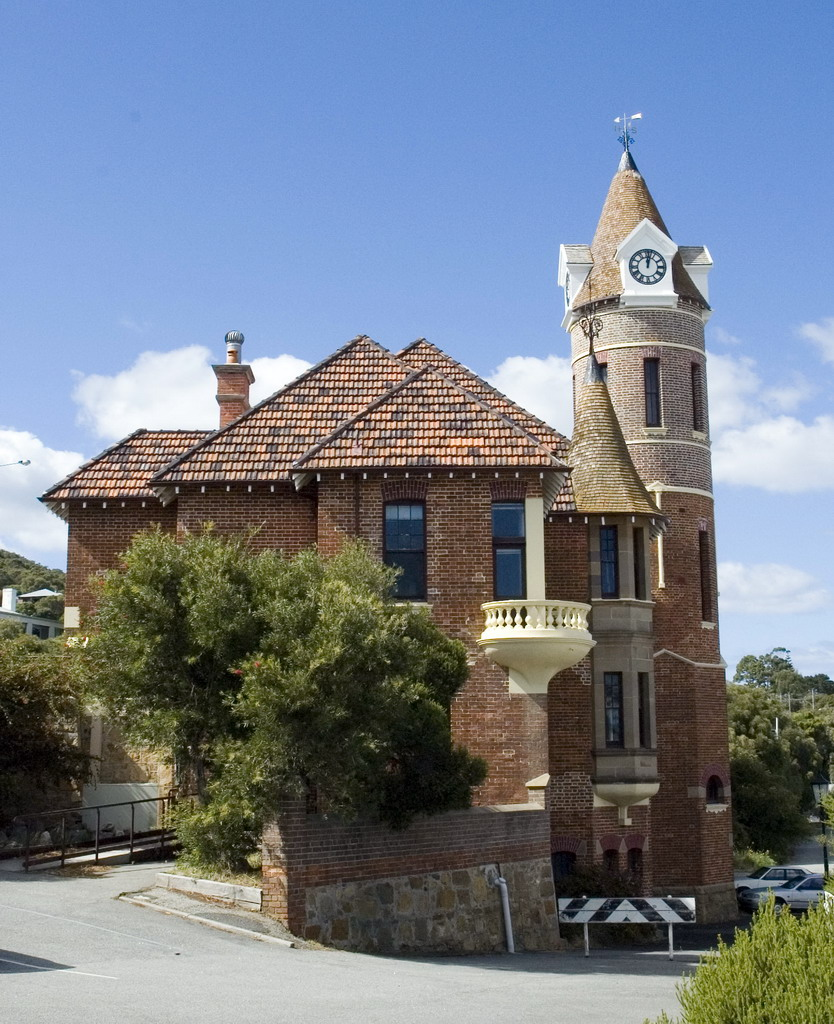
UWA Centre Albany

The university established a UWA Albany Centre in 1999 to meet rural education needs. UWA Albany offers postgraduate coursework and research programs through the Institute for Regional Development and the Centre of Excellence in Natural Resource Management. The UWA Rural Clinical School provides year-long rural placements for third-year medical students in Albany, Derby, Broome, Port Hedland, Karratha, Geraldton, Bunbury, Narrogin, Esperance, and Kalgoorlie; Western Australia. Additionally, the university is involved in the Combined Universities Centre for Rural Health in Geraldton.

The university has further facilities across Stirling Highway in Nedlands, linked by pedestrian underpasses beneath the highway, and paths in front of the residential colleges. Although not directly contiguous with the main Crawley site, the university owns almost every parcel of land between them and has long-term plans to expand the two sites towards each other. The university also has facilities in Claremont, purchased in 2005 from Edith Cowan University. The university prefers to call these facilities UWA Claremont rather than a campus because it wants to remain a single campus institution that is located on the main Crawley campus. UWA Claremont is about 5 kilometres (3.1 mi) west of the main Crawley campus. Further west, the university has staff in central Claremont.

Overseas, the university has strategic partnerships with institutions in Malaysia and Singapore, where students study for UWA qualifications, but does not operate these foreign institutions directly. UWA plans to establish two campuses in India following approval by the country's University Grants Commission in June 2025. The campuses will be located in Mumbai and Chennai.

The university has also developed a relationship with Australian Doctors for Africa with whom it sends academic staff to conduct medical student teaching in Somalia, Madagascar, and Ethiopia. There are two to four visits to each location per year.

== Academia ==
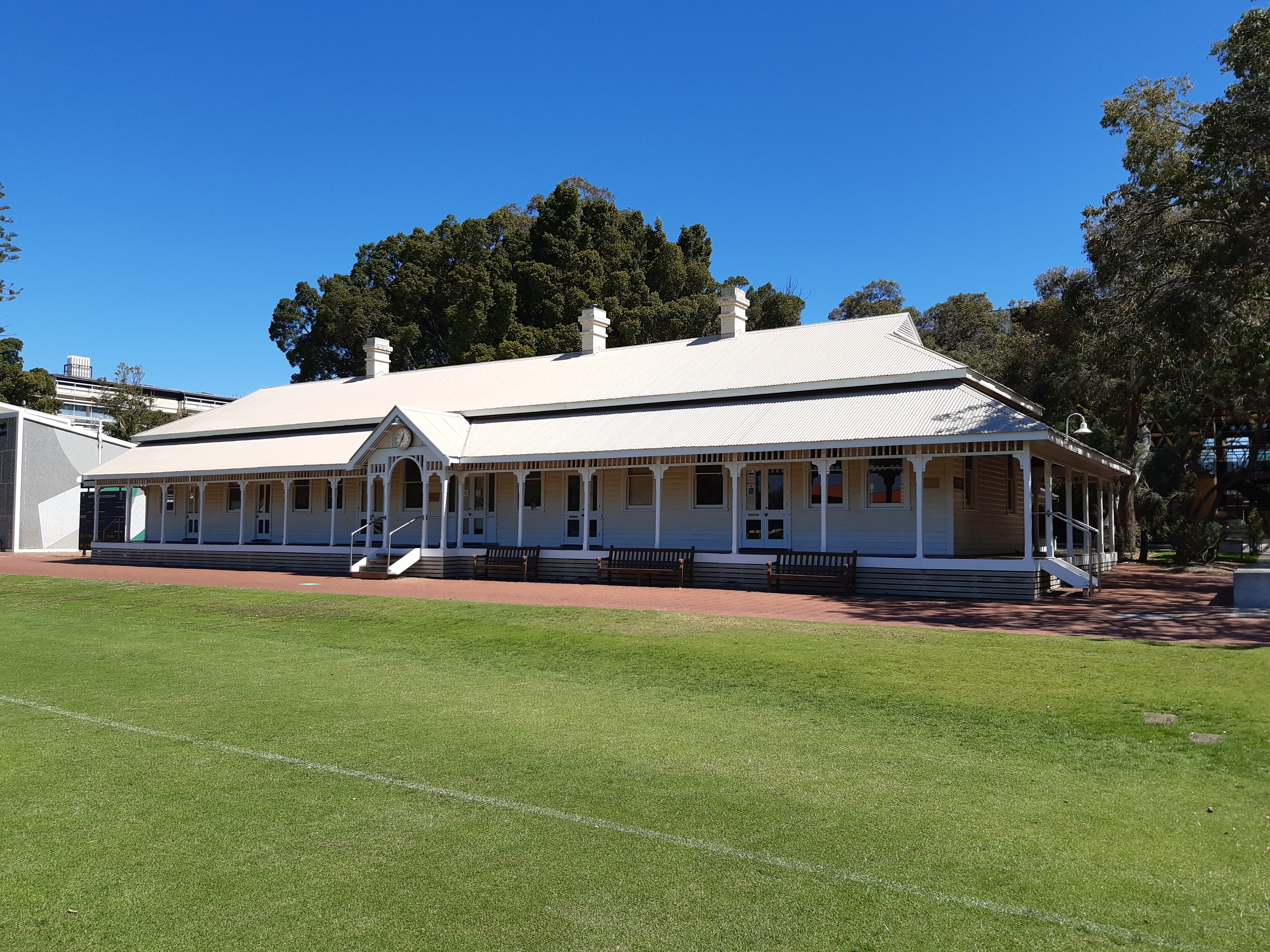
Irwin Street building

The university's degree structure changed in 2012 to bring together the undergraduate and postgraduate degrees available. Justification for this new system is due to its simplicity and effectiveness in outsiders understanding the system. It is the first university in Western Australia to have this new system. Students entering the university at an undergraduate level must choose a three-year bachelor's degree. The university offers a Bachelor of Science (BSc), Bachelor of Commerce (BCom), Bachelor of Arts (BA) and Bachelor of Biomedical Science (BBiomedSc). As of 2017, Bachelor of Design (BDes) is no longer offered to non-first-year students.

=== Bachelor of Philosophy (Honours) ===
The university also offers the Bachelor of Philosophy (Hons) (BPhil) course for high-achieving new students. This is a research intensive degree which takes four years because the honours year is an integral part of the degree (most other degrees last three years with the honours year as a separate degree). Students studying the course choose disciplines from any of the four bachelor's degrees. Places are very limited as students need to achieve an ATAR of 98 for entry into this degree.

=== Assured entry pathways ===
High school graduates with high academic achievement are able to apply for "assured pathways". This means they are assured a place in the postgraduate degree for their chosen discipline while they complete their undergraduate degree. Assured pathways are offered for studies in fields such as medicine, law, and dentistry. Prospective students may apply for an assured pathway through the Bachelor of Philosophy, for all postgraduate degrees apart from Dentistry, Medicine and Podiatry.

== Students ==
UWA's student body is generally dominated by school-leavers from within Western Australia, mostly from the Perth metropolitan area. There are comparatively smaller numbers of mature-age students. In recent years, numbers of full-fee-paying foreign students, predominantly from south-east Asia, have grown as a proportion of the student population. In 2020, the university had 4,373 international student enrolments in a total student body of 18,717.

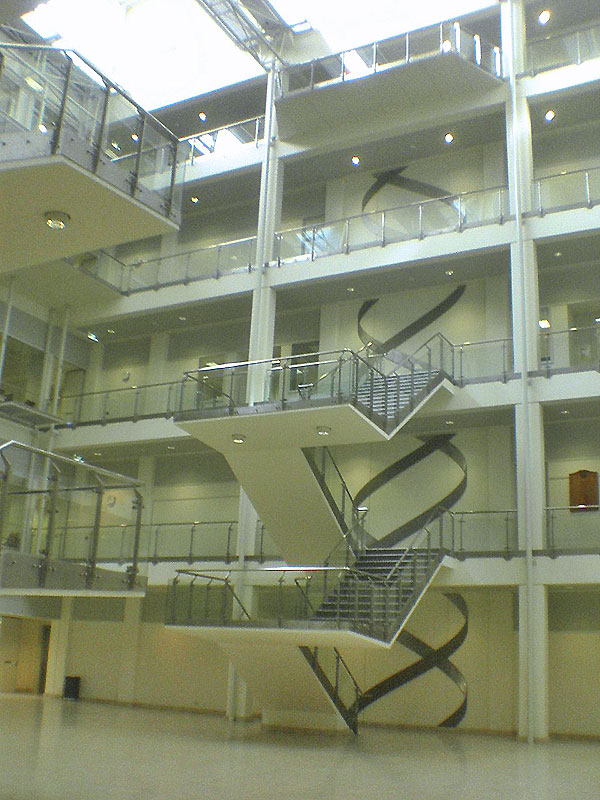
The foyer of the Bayliss Building, featuring the "double helix staircase"

== Academic profile ==
The university recently attracted more competitive research funding than any other Western Australian university. Annually the university receives in excess of $71 million of external research income, expends over $117 million on research and graduates over 300 higher degree by research students, mostly doctorates.

In 2013, during the University of Western Australia's centenary year, Chancellor Michael Chaney AO announced a long-term objective for the university to be ranked among the top 50 research universities globally by 2050. As part of a related fundraising campaign, Andrew and Nicola Forrest made a $65 million donation to the university, one of the largest philanthropic contributions to Australian higher education at the time.

=== Research ===
The university's research priorities include sustainability, health, emerging technologies, environmental resilience, cultural studies, and Indigenous research. In the 2024 Academic Ranking of World Universities by subject, UWA was ranked 9th globally in agricultural sciences and placed within the global top 50 in biological sciences, water resources engineering, and marine/ocean engineering.

The Performance Ranking of Scientific Papers for World Universities, published by National Taiwan University (NTU Ranking), placed the University of Western Australia 138th globally in 2024. The ranking evaluates universities based on the quality and quantity of their scientific research publications. In subject-specific rankings, UWA was ranked 19th globally in agriculture and 12th in plant and animal science, environment and ecology ranked 45th.

The Center for World University Rankings (CWUR), which ranks institutions based on indicators including research output and citations, placed the University of Western Australia at 129th globally in 2024, up from 121st in 2018/19. In the same ranking, UWA was ranked 7th nationally.

The university has over 80 research institutes and centres, including the Oceans Institute, Institute of Agriculture, the Energy and Minerals Institute and the Centre for Software Practice. In 2008, it collaborated with two other universities in forming The Centre for Social Impact.

In 2009, the university received funding from the Government of Western Australia for the International Centre for Radio Astronomy Research, this funding was extended again in 2013 and 2024, the total investment from the WA Government across this period nears $100 million. The centre is a multi-disciplinary research centre for science, engineering and data intensive astronomy. UWA drove Australia's bid to be the site of the Square Kilometre Array, a very large internationally funded radio astronomy installation capable of seeing the early stages of the formation of galaxies, stars and planets. The UWA ranks 61st globally for Space Science according to NTU rankings.

The university is one of the partners in the Western Australian Pregnancy Cohort (Raine) Study, one of the largest cohorts of pregnancy, childhood, adolescence and early adulthood to be carried out anywhere in the world.

=== Academic reputation ===
University rankings

Global – Overall
- ARWU World: 101–150 (2025)
- CWTS World: 211 (Note: The CWTS Leiden Ranking is based on P (top 10%).) (2024)
- QS World: 77 (2026)
- QS Employability: 111–120 (2022)
- THE World: 153 (2026)
- THE Reputation: 151–200 (2025)
- USNWR Global: 98 (25/26)

National – Overall
- ARWU National: 6–7 (2025)
- CWTS National: 8 (2024)
- ERA National: 7 (2018)
- QS National: 7 (2026)
- THE National: 9 (2026)
- USNWR National: 8 (25/26)
- AFR National: 12 (2025)

In the 2024 Aggregate Ranking of Top Universities, which measures aggregate performance across the QS, THE and ARWU rankings, the university attained a position of No. 91 (7th nationally).

National publications

In the Australian Financial Review Best Universities Ranking 2025, the university was ranked No. 12 amongst Australian universities.

Global publications

In the 2026 Quacquarelli Symonds World University Rankings (published 2025), the university attained a position of No. 77 (7th nationally).

In the Times Higher Education World University Rankings 2026 (published 2025), the university attained a position of No. 153 (9th nationally).

In the 2025 Academic Ranking of World Universities, the university attained a position of #101–150 (tied 6–7th nationally).

In the 2025–2026 U.S. News & World Report Best Global Universities, the university attained a position of No. 98 (8th nationally).

In the CWTS Leiden Ranking 2024, the university attained a position of No. 211 (8th nationally).

=== Student outcomes ===
The Australian Government's QILT (Note: Abbreviation for Quality Indicators for Learning and Teaching.) conducts national surveys documenting the student life cycle from enrolment through to employment. These surveys place more emphasis on criteria such as student experience, graduate outcomes and employer satisfaction than perceived reputation, research output and citation counts.

In the 2023 Employer Satisfaction Survey, graduates of the university had an overall employer satisfaction rate of 84.3%.

In the 2023 Graduate Outcomes Survey, graduates of the university had a full-time employment rate of 69.6% for undergraduates and 89.2% for postgraduates. The initial full-time salary was A$67,300 for undergraduates and A$86,900 for postgraduates.

In the 2023 Student Experience Survey, undergraduates at the university rated the quality of their entire educational experience at 75.4% meanwhile postgraduates rated their overall education experience at 74.3%.

== Student life ==
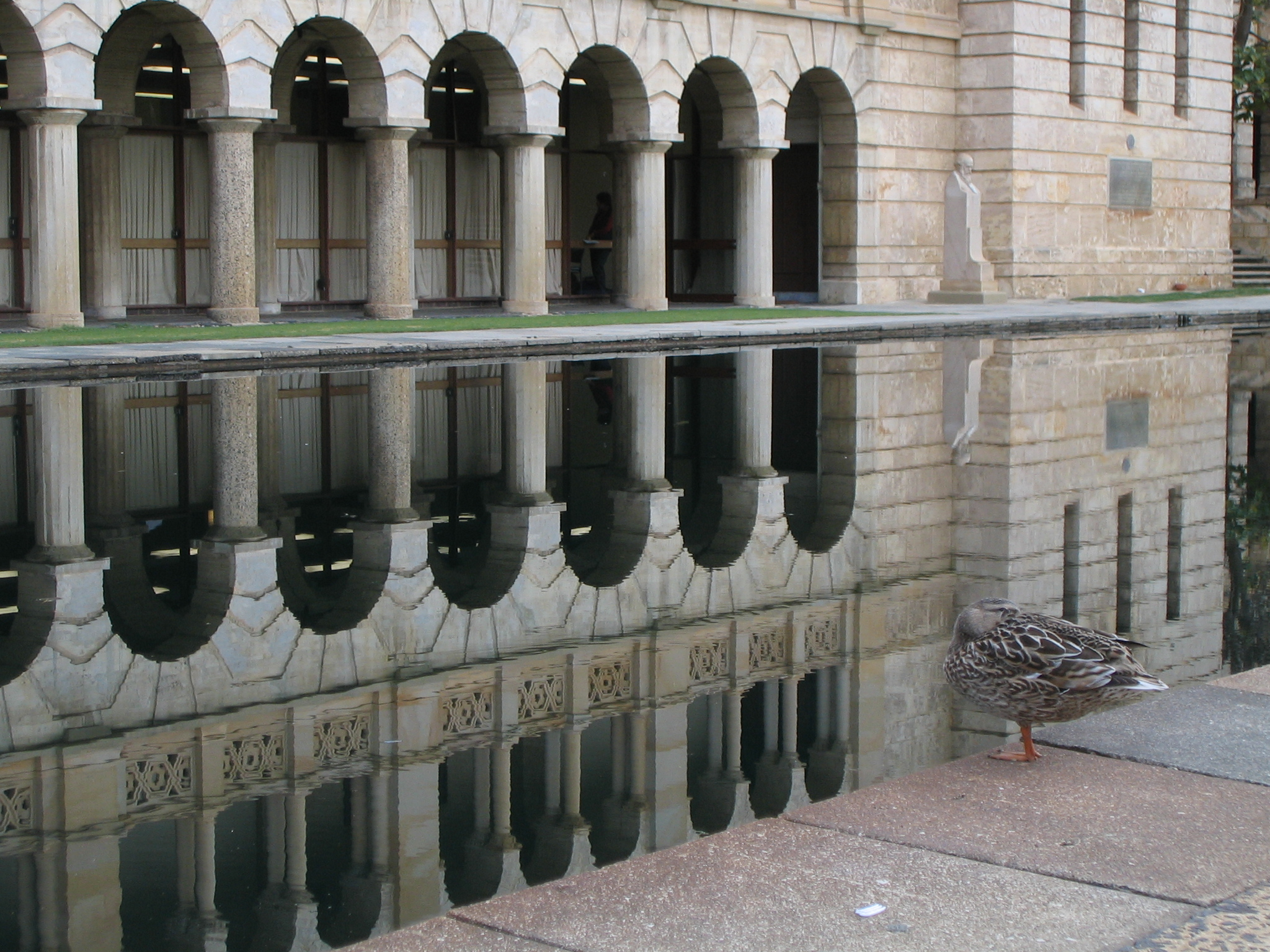
The Reflection Pool was largely built by student volunteers.

The University of Western Australia Student Guild is the premier student representative body on campus. It is affiliated with the National Union of Students. The Guild provides a variety of services from catering to financial counselling. There are also over 100 clubs and societies funded by and affiliated with the Guild. The Guild publishes the student newspaper, Pelican, as well as several other publications and is home to the Prosh charity event newspaper.

The Postgraduate Students' Association is the representative body for postgraduate students at UWA and is a department of the UWA Guild.

=== Residential colleges ===
Residential colleges and additional student residential buildings close to the campus include University Hall (formerly known as Currie Hall), St George's College, St Catherine's College, Trinity Residential College and St Thomas More College. St Catherine's College also offers short stays for non-student visitors.

The colleges border each other and run along the main campus. Students of UWA refer to the location of the colleges, which run along a common road, as "college row". All the colleges are co-ed and host several inter-college events throughout the year, in which residents of the various hostels compete against one another in a selection of events. Notable inter-college events include lip dub, in which the colleges compete against one another in a series of lip dub videos, and battle of the bands.

Some of the residential colleges have their own mascots. St Catherine's mascot is a cat, St George's a dragon and St Thomas More's a rooster.

Students along college row tend to have short names for each of the colleges, and nicknames for the hostels have become a part of the resident culture. St Catherine's College is known as St Cat's, St Thomas More College nicknamed Tommy More, St George's College George's, University Hall Uni Hall and Trinity Residential College Trin.

== Sport ==
The WAIS Warriors basketball team played their home games at UWA during their brief stint in the State Basketball League between 1989 and 1991.

== Publishing ==
UWA has had a publishing arm since 1935, when the university was the sole tertiary campus in Western Australia. In 2009 it was renamed as UWA Publishing.

=== Outskirts ===
The journal Outskirts: feminisms along the edge is a feminist cultural studies journal which was published biannually, in May and November, from 1997 to 2020. Formerly published by the Centre for Women's Studies, it has most recently through the School of Humanities.

It is a double-blind, peer-reviewed academic journal. It was supported by editorial consultants and independent academic referees from a number of other Australasian universities, including Flinders University, the University of Adelaide, the University of Auckland, Monash University and the University of Queensland. Outskirts began as a printed magazine in 1996, and went online in 1998 as an Open Access Journal. The last edition published was Volume 14, in May 2019.

Its stated aim was "to provide a space in which new and challenging critical material from a range of disciplinary perspectives and addressing a range of feminist topics and issues is brought together to discuss and contest contemporary and historical issues involving women and feminisms".

== Notable people ==
Many notable UWA graduates have excelled in various professions, in particular in politics and government. Premiers of Western Australia have included graduates Alan Carpenter, Colin Barnett, Geoff Gallop, Richard Court and Carmen Lawrence. Former federal ministers include Kim Edward Beazley, his son, former deputy prime minister Kim Beazley, and Australia's 23rd prime minister, Bob Hawke. Troy Pickard, local government politician. The former Chief Justice of the Australian High Court, Robert French is also a graduate of the UWA Law School. Scientific and medical graduates include Nobel Prize laureate Barry Marshall, the Australian of the Year for 2003 Fiona Stanley and the Australian of the Year for 2005 Fiona Wood. The former CEO of Ansett Airlines and British Airways, Rod Eddington, is a graduate of the UWA School of Engineering. Professor Ross Day was appointed Foundation Chair of the Department of Psychology at Monash University in 1965 and contributed to the standing of the discipline amongst the sciences. Graduates with outstanding sporting achievements include former Kookaburras (hockey) captain and Hockeyroos coach Ric Charlesworth. British-born Australian comedian Tim Minchin also attended UWA. Parwinder Kaur, inducted into the WA Women's Hall of fame and WA Parliamentarian, is a graduate of UWA. Mining magnate Andrew Forrest and businessman and sport administrator Richard Goyder are graduates of UWA.

Current staff of note include clinical psychologist David Indermaur (also a graduate of the university), 2009 Western Australian Scientist of the year Cheryl Praeger, former Western Australian Premier Colin Barnett and former Labor federal minister Stephen Smith.

== Gallery ==
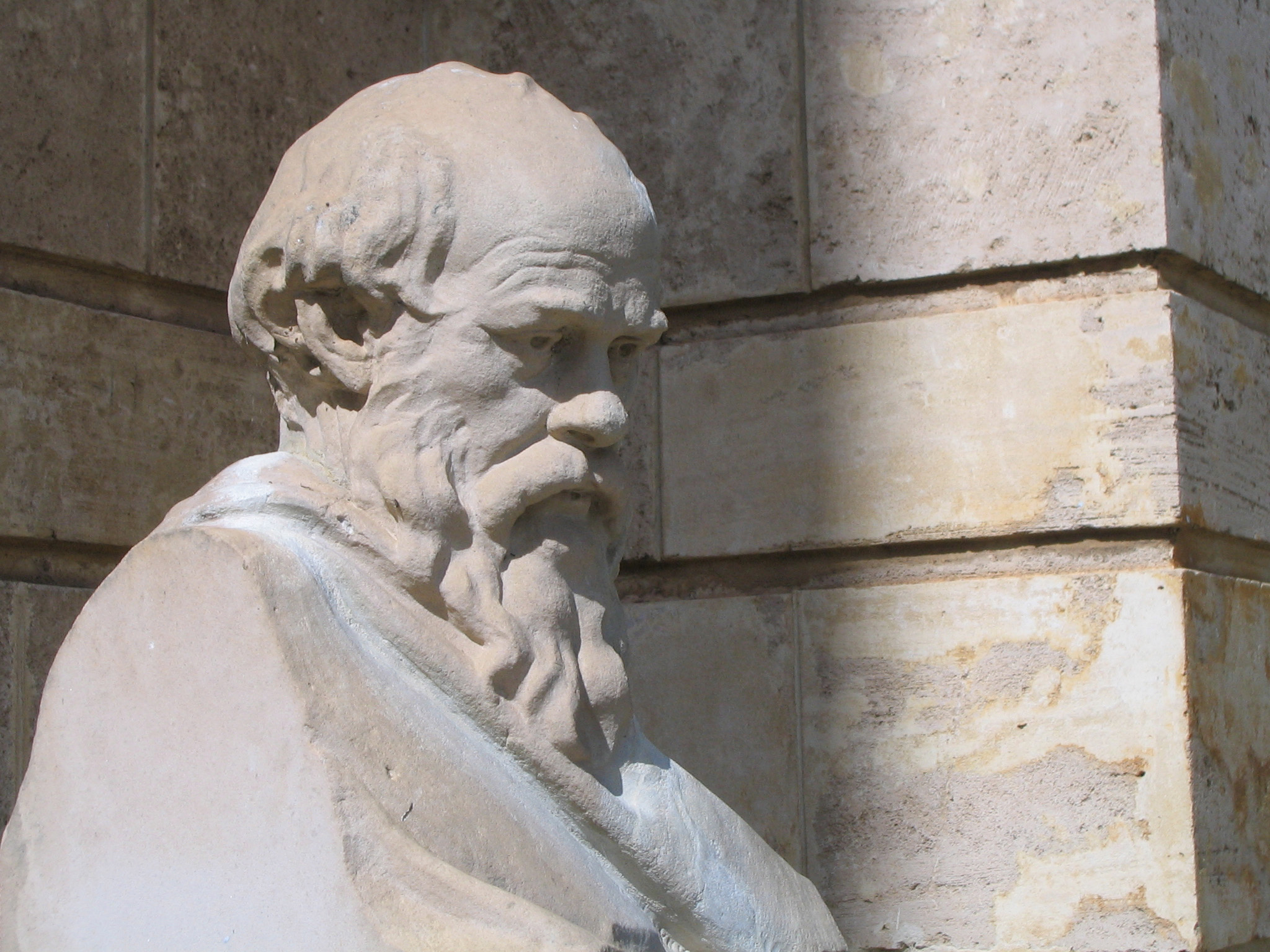
Socrates bust

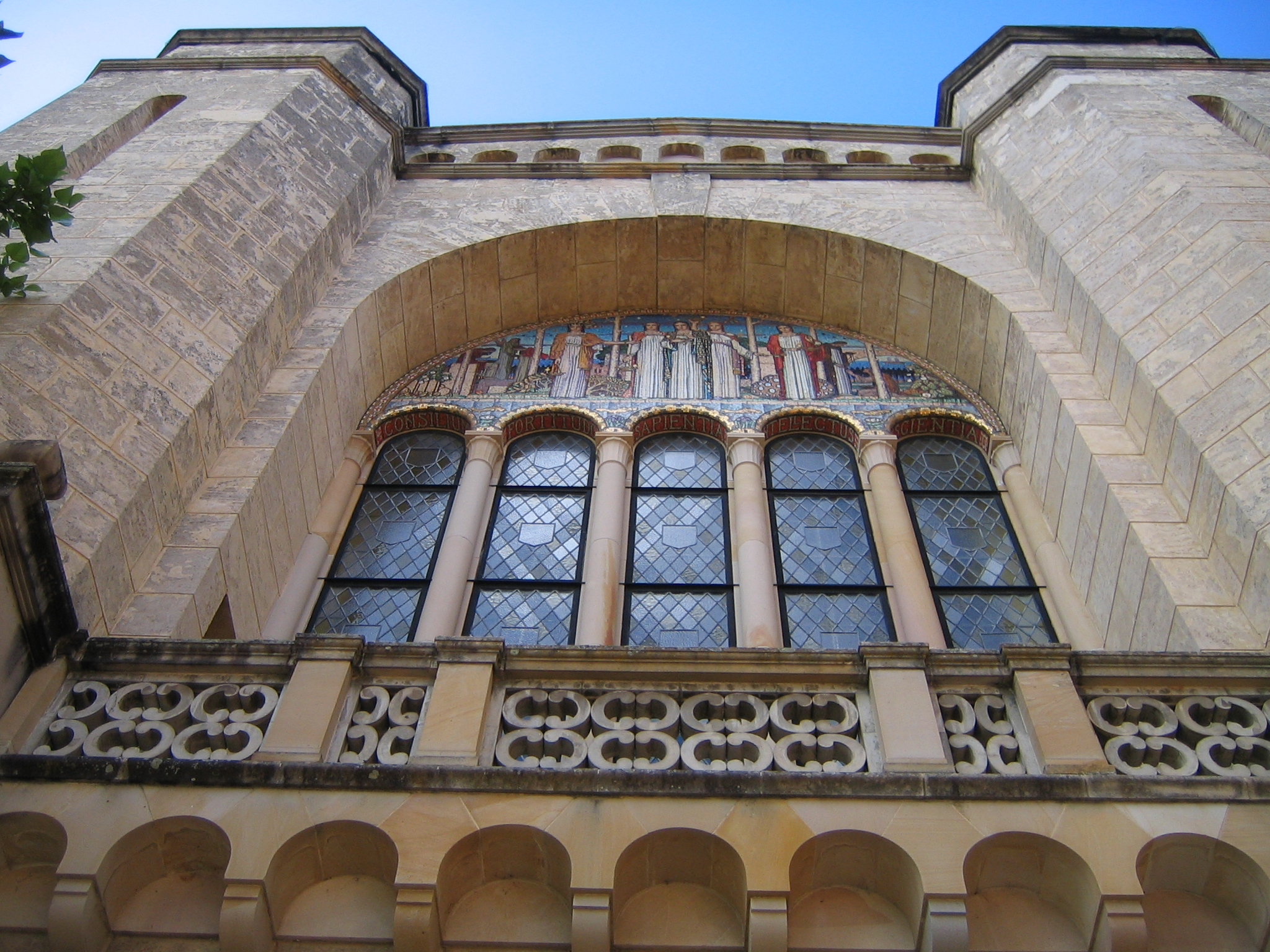
Great gate mosaic

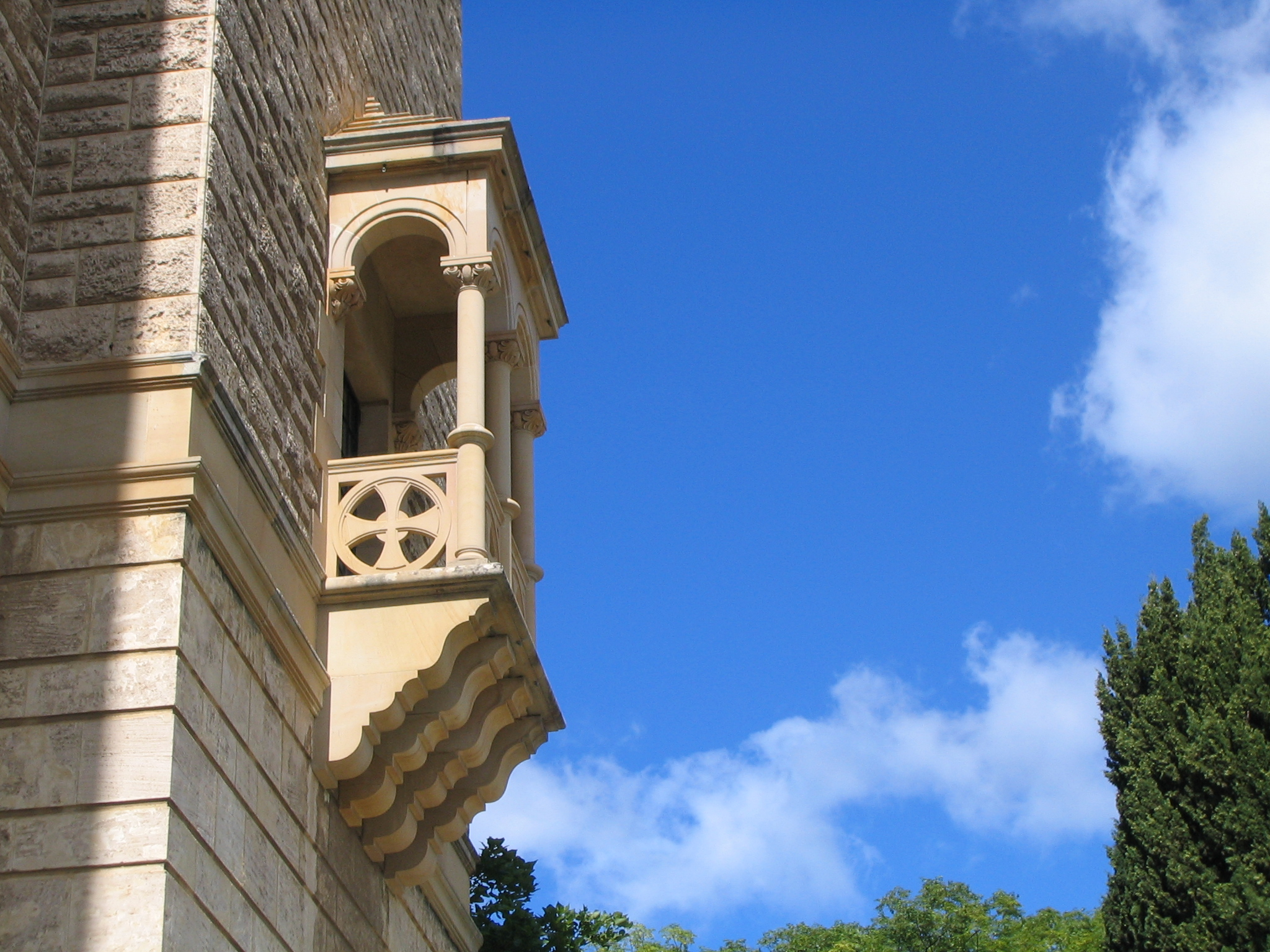
Clock tower balcony

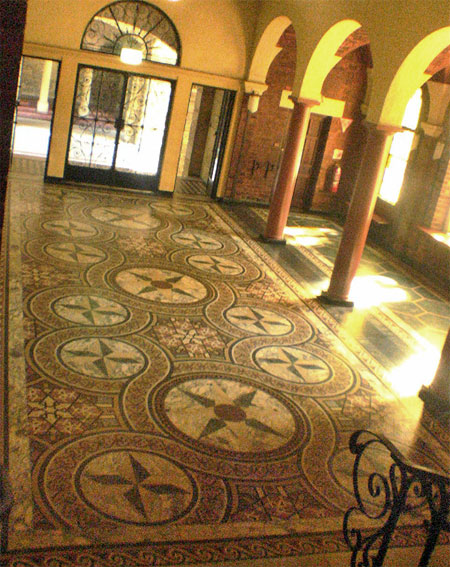
Winthrop Hall foyer

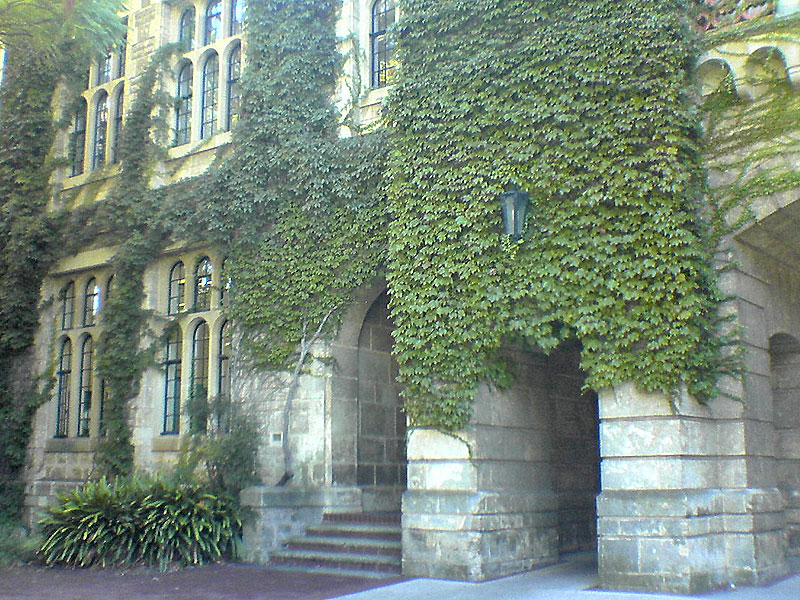
Administration building

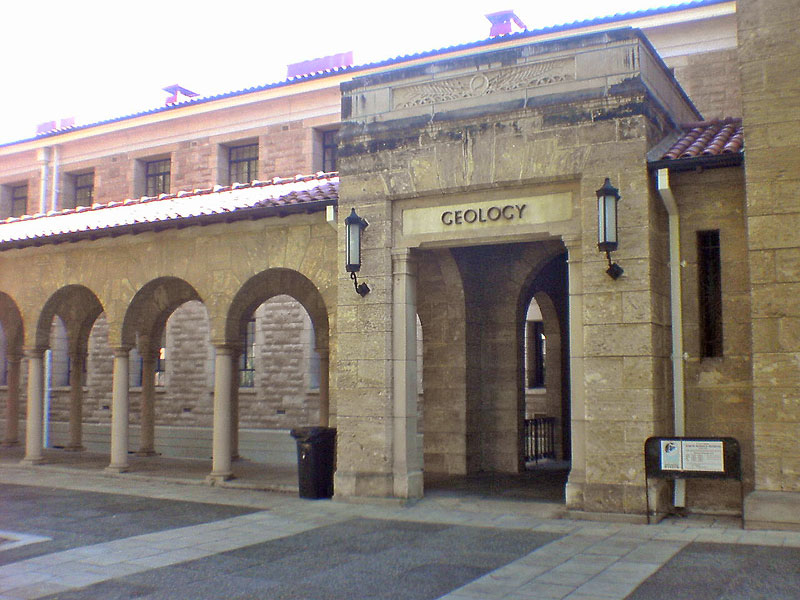
North entrance to geology building

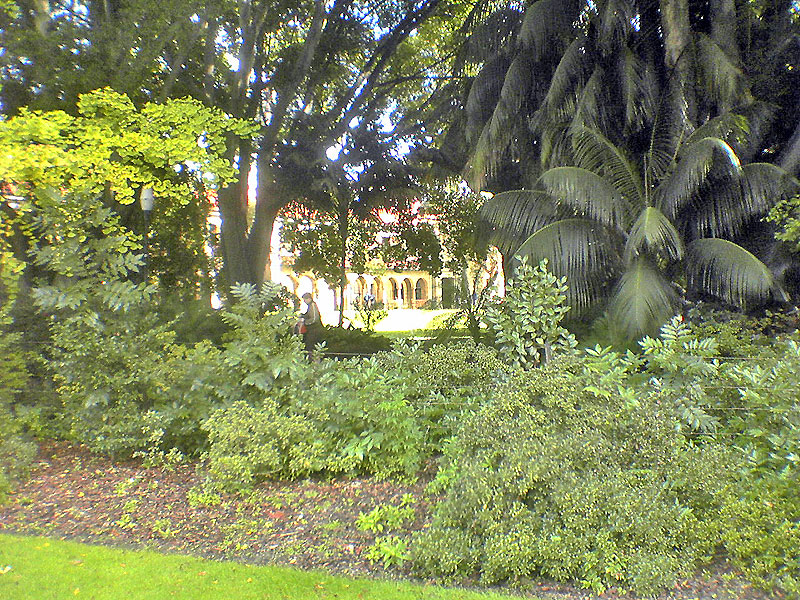
The Geology building seen through the Grove

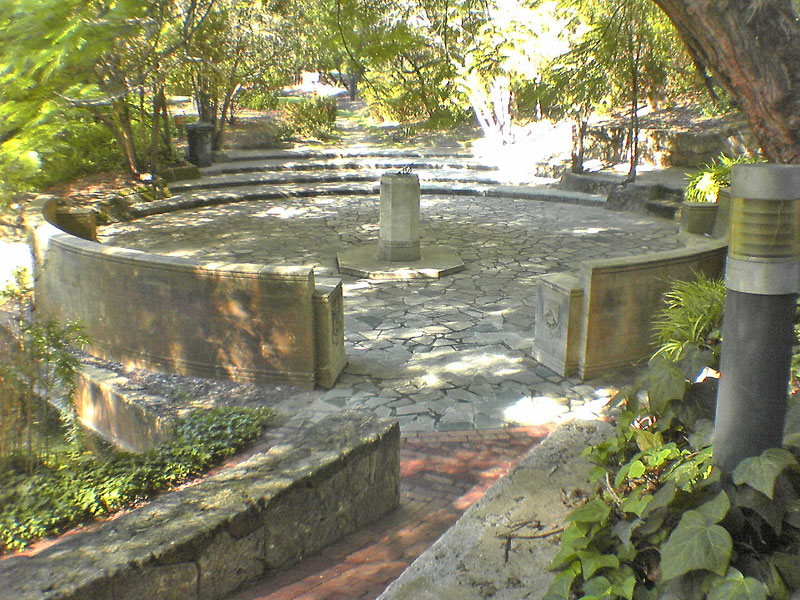
Sundial near the Sunken Garden

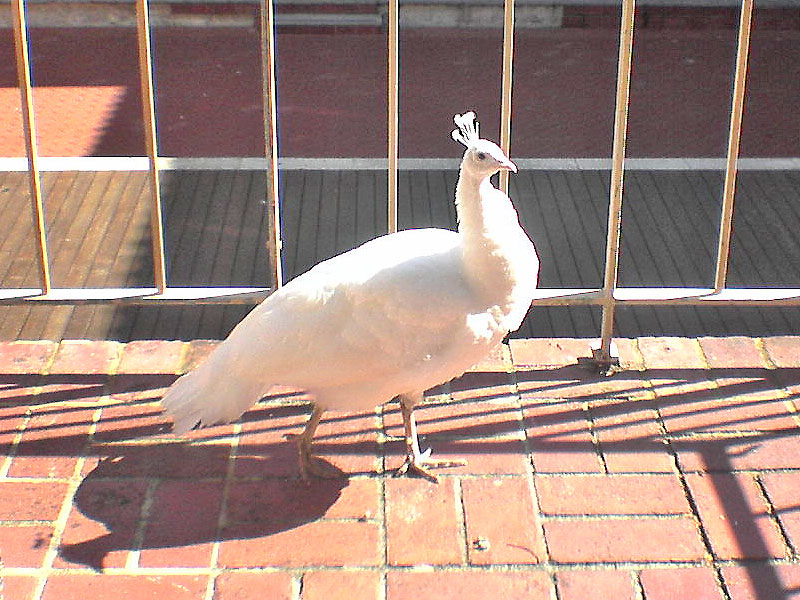
Adult white peacock (Puck), New Fortune Theatre

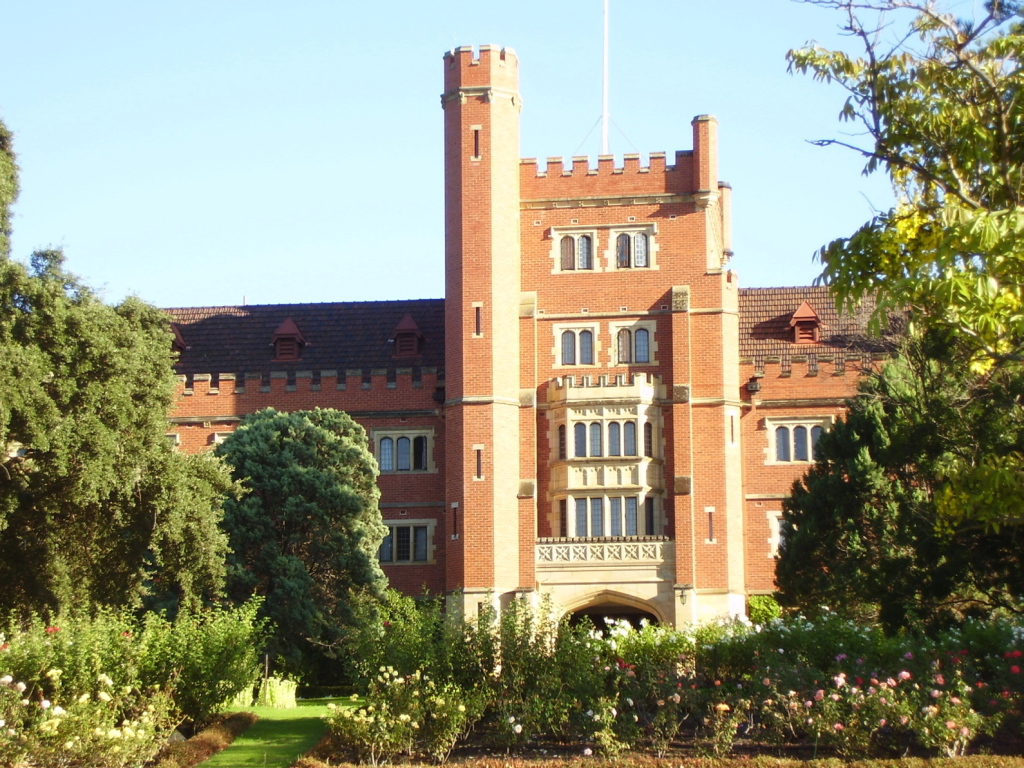
St George's College

== See also ==
- Australian National Business Schools
- List of universities in Australia
- List of official openings by Elizabeth II in Australia
- Rural Clinical School of Western Australia
- UWA Telerobot
- UWA School of Medicine
- UWA Business School
