= Rural Clinical School of Western Australia =

Location
- Western Australia; Australia
- Coordinates: 33.652646°S 115.338652°E

Information
- Established: 2002

The Rural Clinical School of Western Australia (RCSWA) is a Commonwealth-funded program intended to increase the number of medical graduates interested in rural careers. The school is part of the network of rural clinical schools across Australia funded by the same federal Department of Health and Ageing workforce program. It places medical students in their penultimate clinical year for an entire academic year in rural towns throughout Western Australia. Certain Rural Clinical Schools also allow students to continue on to complete their final year.

In 2007, it became the first of Australian RCSs to enter a public-private university partnership. It is a collaboration between its founder, the University of Western Australia, and the University of Notre Dame Australia.

The students represent 25% of third year UWA and third year UNDA medical undergraduates.

== Locations ==
The Rural Clinical School operates in most of the large country towns in Western Australia. It has its head office in Kalgoorlie, and students in Kalgoorlie, Esperance, Albany, Bunbury, Busselton, Carnarvon, Narrogin, Geraldton, Karratha, Port Hedland, Broome and Derby. These towns range in population from 5,000 to 50,000.

The students' clinical placements occur in general practices, local hospitals, community and remote clinics, Aboriginal medical services and other health facilities.

== Achievements ==
In 2007 the RCSWA programme was awarded a Carrick Award predominantly for curriculum innovation. The content of the curriculum is identical to the urban curriculum but is delivered in a significantly different way. The students are taught and assessed (examined) to the same standard as the urban students and the results are entirely comparable to the urban programme.

The number of students at each RCSWA site by year.
| Year | Kalgoorlie | Albany | Broome | Bunbury | Derby | Esperance | Geraldton | Karratha | Narrogin | Port Hedland | Total |
|---|---|---|---|---|---|---|---|---|---|---|---|
| 2006 | 10 | 6 | 7 | - | - | 3 | 4 | 3 | - | 3 | 36 |
| 2007 | 10 (6 UWA, 4 ND) | 9 (3 UWA, 5 ND) | 8 (6 UWA, 2 ND) | 10 (6 UWA, 4 ND) | 3 (3 UWA) | 3 (3 UWA) | 9 (6 UWA, 3 ND) | 3 (3 UWA) | 4 (1 UWA, 3 ND) | 3 (3 UWA) | 62 |
| 2008 | 10 | 10 | 8 | 10 | 3 | 4 | 10 | 3 | 4 | 5 | 67 |
