= Edith Cowan University =

University in Perth, Western Australia

Coordinates: 31°45′00″S 115°46′15″E

- This image is the coat of arms of Edith Cowan University.
- Former names: List: Claremont Teachers College (1902–1981); Western Australian College of Advanced Education (1982–1990)
- Motto: Freedom Through Knowledge
- Type: Public research university
- Established: 1902 (antecedent); 1982 (as college); 1991 (as university)
- Accreditation: TEQSA
- Academic affiliations: Utrecht Network (AEN); AMC; CILECT; OUA
- Budget: A$486.23 million (2023)
- Visitor: Governor of Western Australia (ex officio)
- Chancellor: Gaye McMath
- Vice-Chancellor: Clare Pollock
- Academic staff: 822 (FTE, 2023)
- Administrative staff: 1,187 (FTE, 2023)
- Total staff: 2,009 (FTE, 2023)
- Students: 30,135 (2023)
- Undergraduates: 18,048 (2023)
- Postgraduates: 9,573 (2023)
- Doctoral students: 654 (2023)
- Other students: 1,860 (2023)
- Location: Perth and Bunbury, Western Australia, Australia
- Campus: 120.7 ha (298.3 acres); Urban and regional
- Named after: Edith Dircksey Cowan
- Colours: Black Teal
- Nickname: Various
- Sporting affiliations: UniSport; EAEN
- Mascot: Ernie the Emu
- Website: www.ecu.edu.au

Edith Cowan University (ECU) is a public research university in Western Australia. It is named in honour of Edith Cowan, the first woman to be elected to an Australian parliament. It is the second-largest university in the state with over 30,000 students in 2023. Gaining university status in 1991, it was formed from an amalgamation of tertiary colleges with a history dating back to 1902 when the Claremont Teachers College was established.

It offers study programs in environmental science, healthcare, biomedicine, computer science, education, engineering, psychology, sports science, law, business, humanities, social sciences, aeronautics and the performing arts. It also offers a Doctor of Philosophy (PhD) research program and various majors of study in commerce, the arts and sciences. The university has a partnership with the University of Portsmouth in the United Kingdom, with which it offers dual-enrolled programs with integrated overseas study, and the University of Tasmania for naval engineering. ECU also has a notable cybersecurity research program being one of two universities operating federal Academic Centres of Cyber Security Excellence (ACCSE) and the only Australian member university in the InterNational Cyber Security Center of Excellence (INCS-CoE).

It has two metropolitan campuses in Perth (Joondalup and in the Perth CBD) and a regional campus in Bunbury. The main Joondalup campus forms the flagship institution of the Joondalup Learning Precinct. The Perth CBD campus, known as ECU City, is home to its Western Australian Academy of Performing Arts, and is located west of Yagan Square. The Bunbury campus is located adjacent to the St John of God Bunbury Hospital.

The university has produced some of Australia's most prominent figures in the performing arts, operates a large nursing school, has a long history of teacher education and has a significant presence in cybersecurity research.

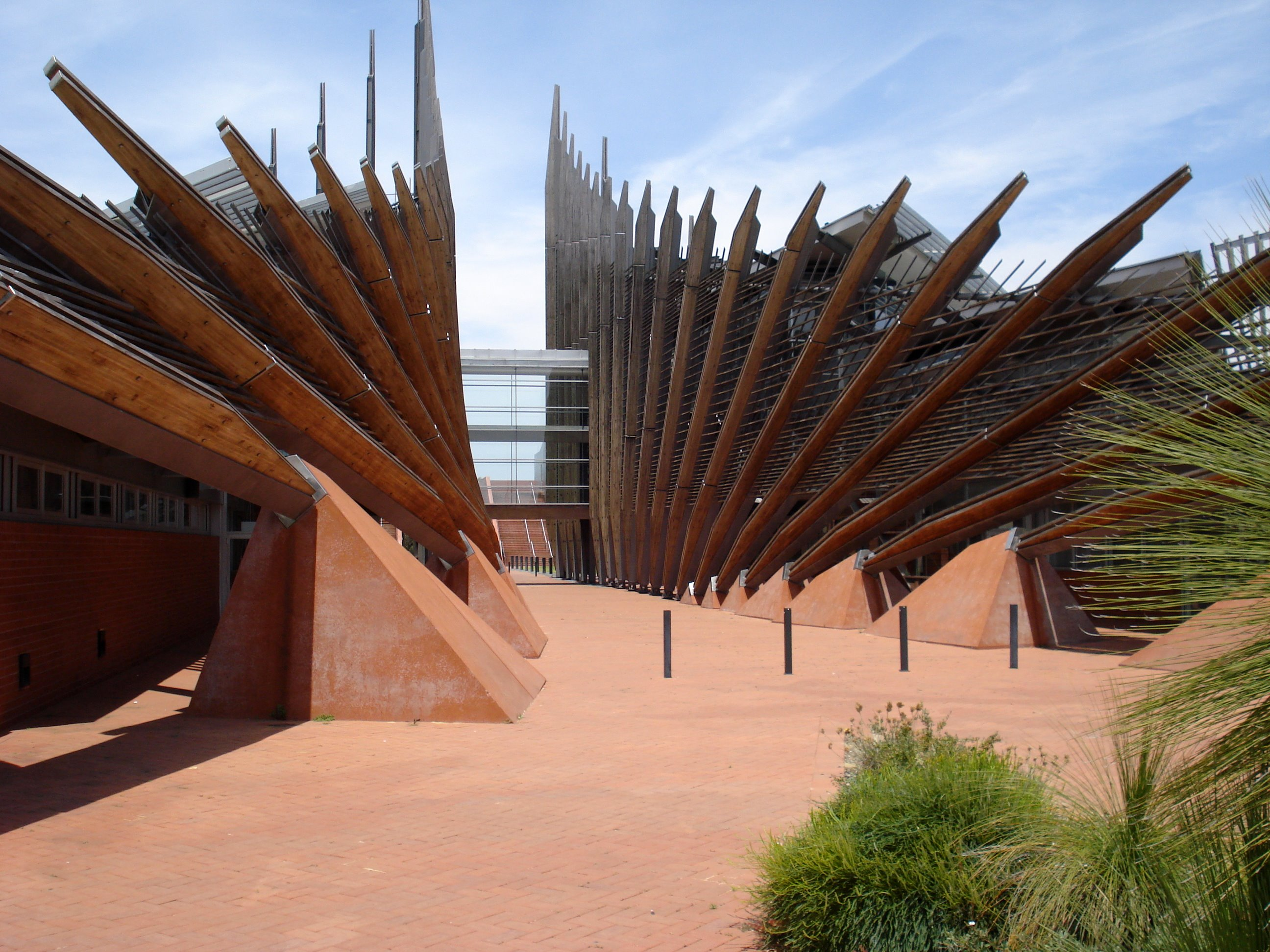
Entrance to the Joondalup campus

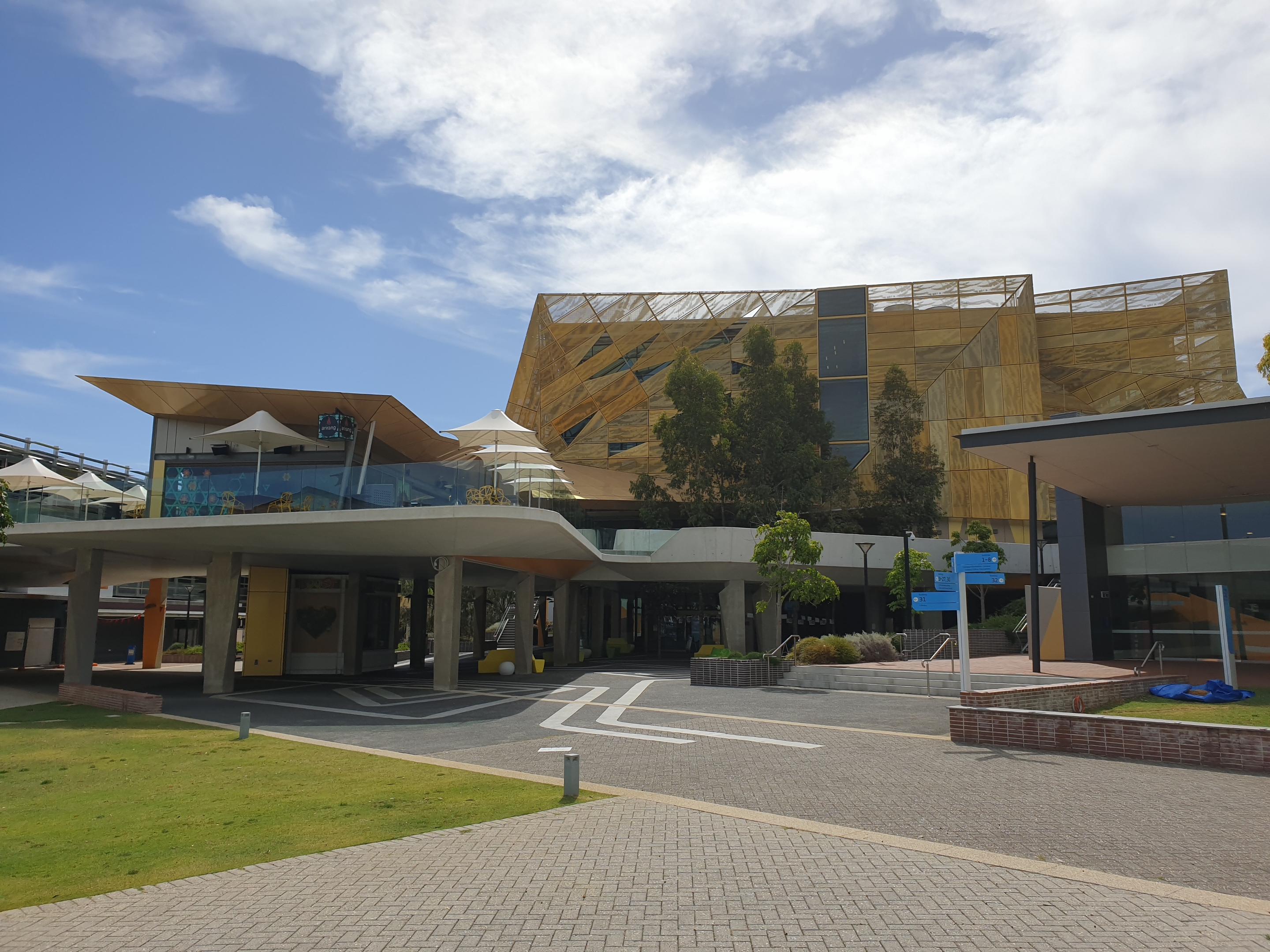
The central student services hub

== History ==
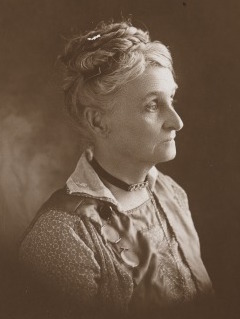
Edith Cowan in 1921, the year she was elected to parliament

In 1847, the General Board of Education was established to oversee school development in the Swan River Colony. After becoming the Central Board of Education, it was superseded by the then-called Education Department in 1893, which classified schools, graded teachers, defined teachers' positions, implemented a salary scale for teachers, abolished school fees, provided for co-educational schools and made attendance compulsory for children between the ages of six and 14. At this time, the Education Department had "external study" for student teachers, where they taught in the classroom while studying for examinations set by the Department.

The origins of Edith Cowan University date back to 1902 with the establishment of the Claremont Teachers College. Students could gain qualifications through studying at the College, which remained the only place one could do this until the 1950s when the Churchlands and Graylands colleges opened. The function of teacher education did not pass into the university sector until the 1980s. The former Claremont campus is on land between Goldsworthy, Princess and Bay Roads in the western Perth suburb of Claremont. It is a large two storey limestone building set in extensive grounds, with a distinctive square crenellated tower, and was entered in the Register of the National Estate in 1987.

Over time, other teacher training colleges were formed, including Graylands Teachers College (GTC) in 1955, the Western Australian Secondary Teachers College (WASTC) in 1967 that was renamed Nedlands College of Advanced Education (NCAE) on 1 January 1979, Mount Lawley Teachers College (MLTC) in 1970 and Churchlands Teachers College in 1972. The Graylands Teachers College in 1977 was recommended by the Commonwealth Government for closure at the end of 1979, to be merged into Churchlands, Mount Lawley and Claremont.

On 11 December 1981, the Claremont Teachers College, Nedlands College of Advanced Education, Mount Lawley College of Advanced Education and Churchlands College of Advanced Education amalgamated to form the Western Australian College of Advanced Education (WACAE, or colloquially wacky), with campuses in Churchlands, Claremont, Mount Lawley and Nedlands. A new Bunbury campus started taking in students in 1986, and a new Joondalup campus in 1987. During the 1980s, Western Australia's first nursing education program was also established.

The Claremont Teachers College's last Director was Thomas Ryan (1924–2002), who completed his teacher training at the College and graduated in 1947. He was appointed Vice-Principal of the College in 1972, a position he held until his appointment as Director of the College in 1980.

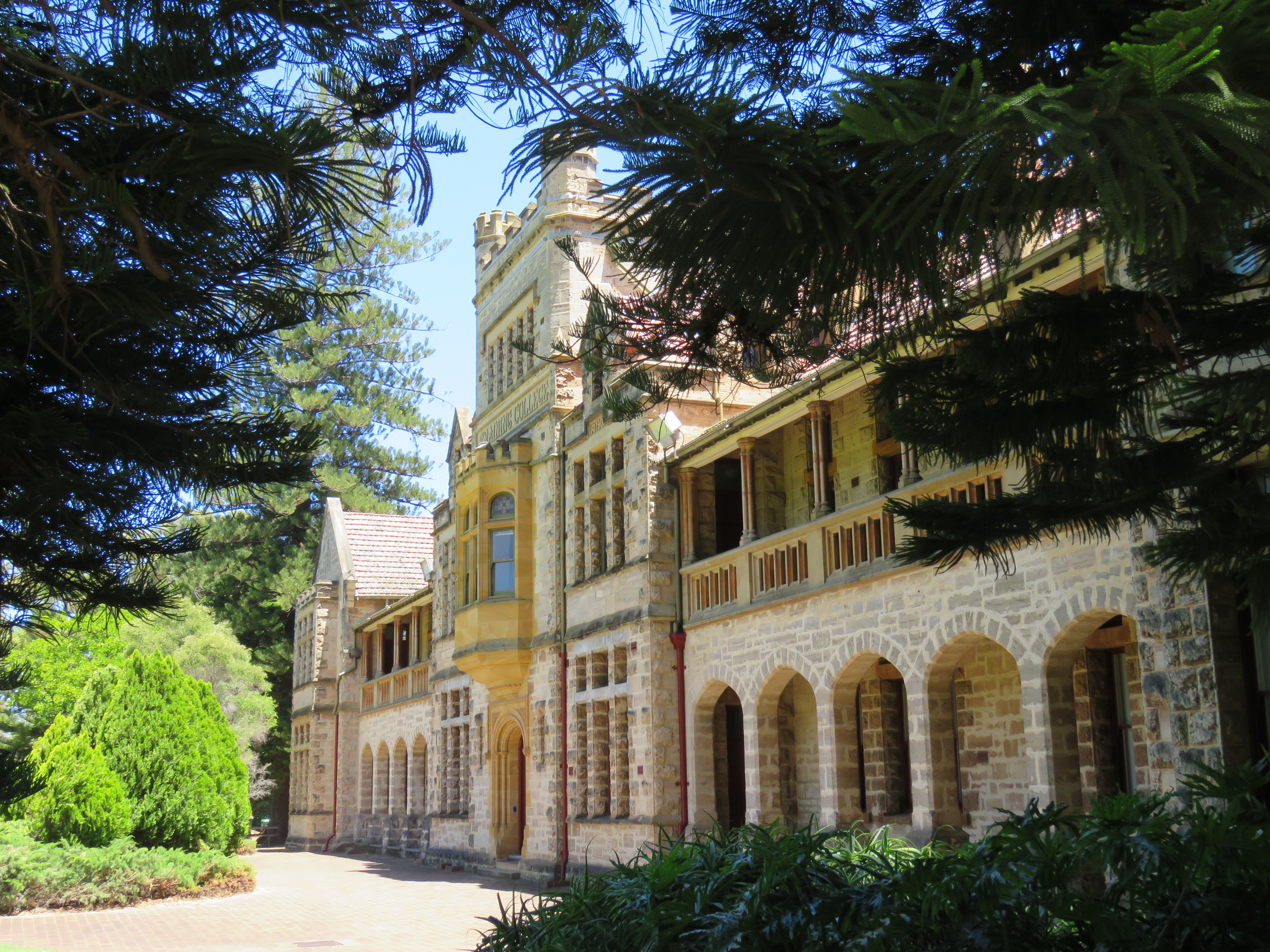
The original Claremont campus was sold to the University of Western Australia in 2004.

In 1989, WACAE underwent an independent review led by the former University of Melbourne vice chancellor David Caro in the form of the Caro Committee, which included Roy Lourens who later became vice chancellor of Edith Cowan University. One of the earlier proposals in the late 1980s for the name of the institution was Perth University. WACAE was granted university status on 1 January 1991 and changed its name to Edith Cowan University after Edith Dircksey Cowan, the first woman to be elected to an Australian Parliament. As of 2025, Edith Cowan University is the only Australian university named after a woman.

Cowan worked to raise funds for students to attend universities in other states, prior to a university being built in Western Australia, obtaining government support for her scheme. Her work in this area was acknowledged by naming Western Australia's oldest tertiary education institution and newest university after her, as well as her image being added to the 1995 and 2018 designs (the polymer designs) of the Australian $50 note. Cowan believed that education was the key to growth, change and improvement and her contribution to the development of Western Australian education was significant. She strove to achieve social justice and campaigned for the rights of women, children and families, for the poor, the poorly educated and the elderly. She promoted sex education in schools, migrant welfare, and the formation of infant health centres, and was instrumental in obtaining votes for women in Western Australia.

In 1991, the university purchased the house that Cowan, her husband and family had resided in for approximately 20 years. The house was reconstructed on the university's Joondalup campus with the assistance of the West Coast College of TAFE, and re-opened in 1997. Edith Cowan House, Building 20 on the university's Joondalup campus, currently plays host to the Peter Cowan Writers Centre.

The original Claremont building continued serving for 16 years as a campus of Edith Cowan University following that institution's formation in 1989. The campus was then acquired by the University of Western Australia and became home to the Confucius Institute, University of Western Australia Press and, until 2021, Taylors College.

In 2020, as part of the $1.5-billion "Perth City Deal" between the federal government and state government of Western Australia, it was proposed to relocate the Mount Lawley campus to a new site immediately west of Yagan Square, with the proposed new campus to be called "ECU City". On 17 December 2021, the city campus project was approved by DevelopmentWA. It was initially announced to open in 2025 at a cost of $695 million, but the cost later increased to $853 million. Construction on the site was expected to begin in the second quarter of 2022; construction ultimately kicked off in February 2023 and ended in late 2025 for an intended 2026 commencement of classes. Consequently, the existing campus at Mount Lawley ceased classes in late 2025 and will be vacated by the end of 2027.

== Organisation ==
=== Teaching schools ===
The university has eight teaching schools, each with their own school colours.

School of Arts and Humanities

Broad disciplines: Communication, Arts, Humanities, Psychology, Social Sciences, Social Work, Criminology and Justice

School of Business and Law

The School of Business and Law was established during 1975 in Churchlands as the School of Business Studies and originally offered majors in accounting and administrative studies before expanding to other fields and campuses. The inaugural Head of School was Dr Valentine M Pervan, who assumed the role on 1 July 1975, and courses started the following year with an initial enrolment of 224 students. The school provided the college's first courses in computing studies, which used PDP 11 and IBM 4331 computers. The school received a donation of one IBM System/82 from International Business Machines (IBM) in November 1982/1983, which was installed at the Mount Lawley campus. The school later became centralised at the newly built Joondalup campus but continued offering programs at other campuses.

The school provides education and research programs in various fields of commerce and law. These include double degree undergraduate programs with each other, engineering, psychology, criminology and various fields in the arts. The school is accredited by Association to Advance Collegiate Schools of Business (ACCSB), an accrediting body for business schools.

The School moved from the Joondalup to the City campus in early 2026.

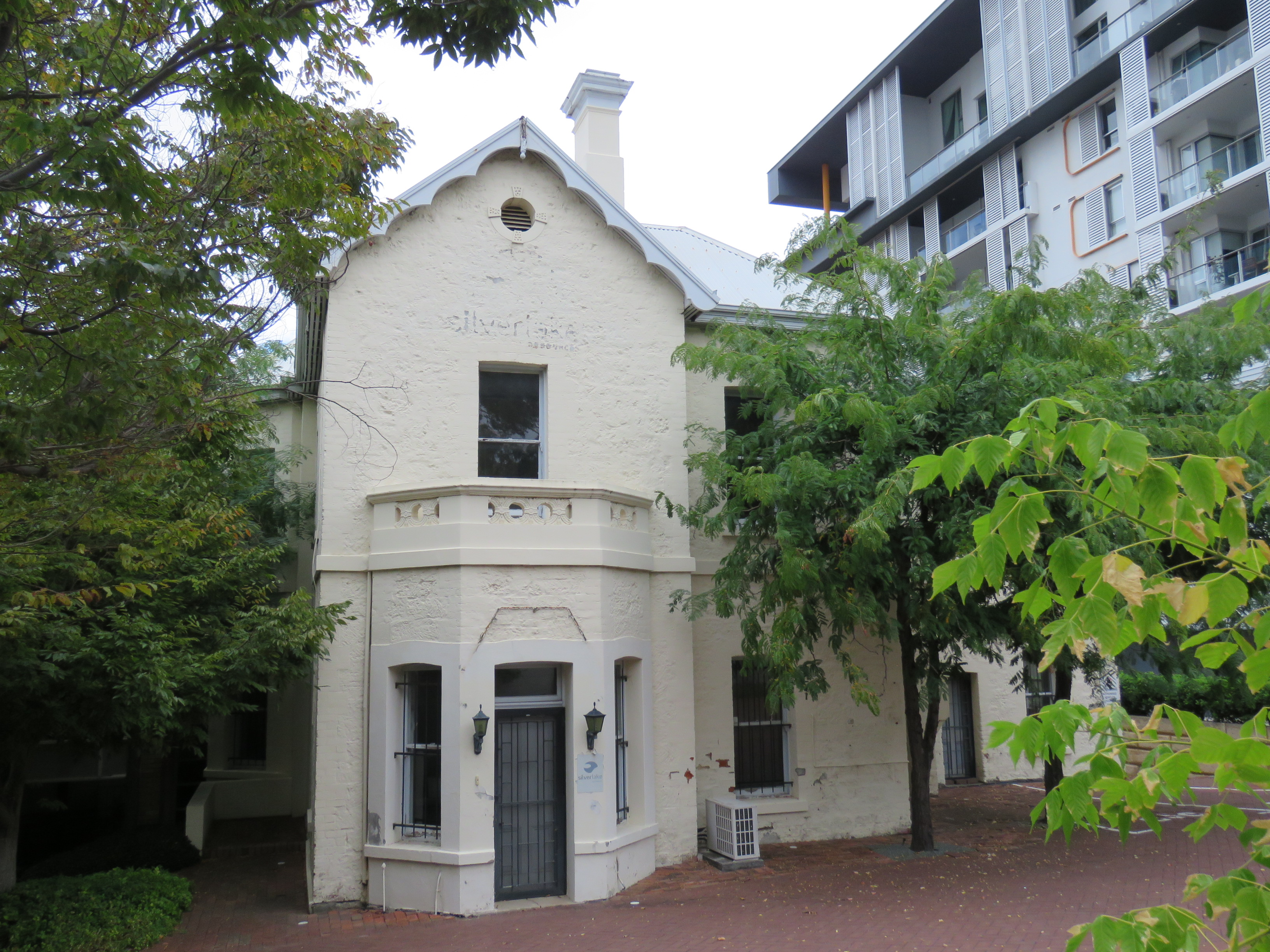
Edith Cowan's home, which was transported to the Joondalup campus, forms the Peter Cowan Writers Centre.

School of Education Broad disciplines: Teacher education for Early Childhood, Primary and Secondary schools.

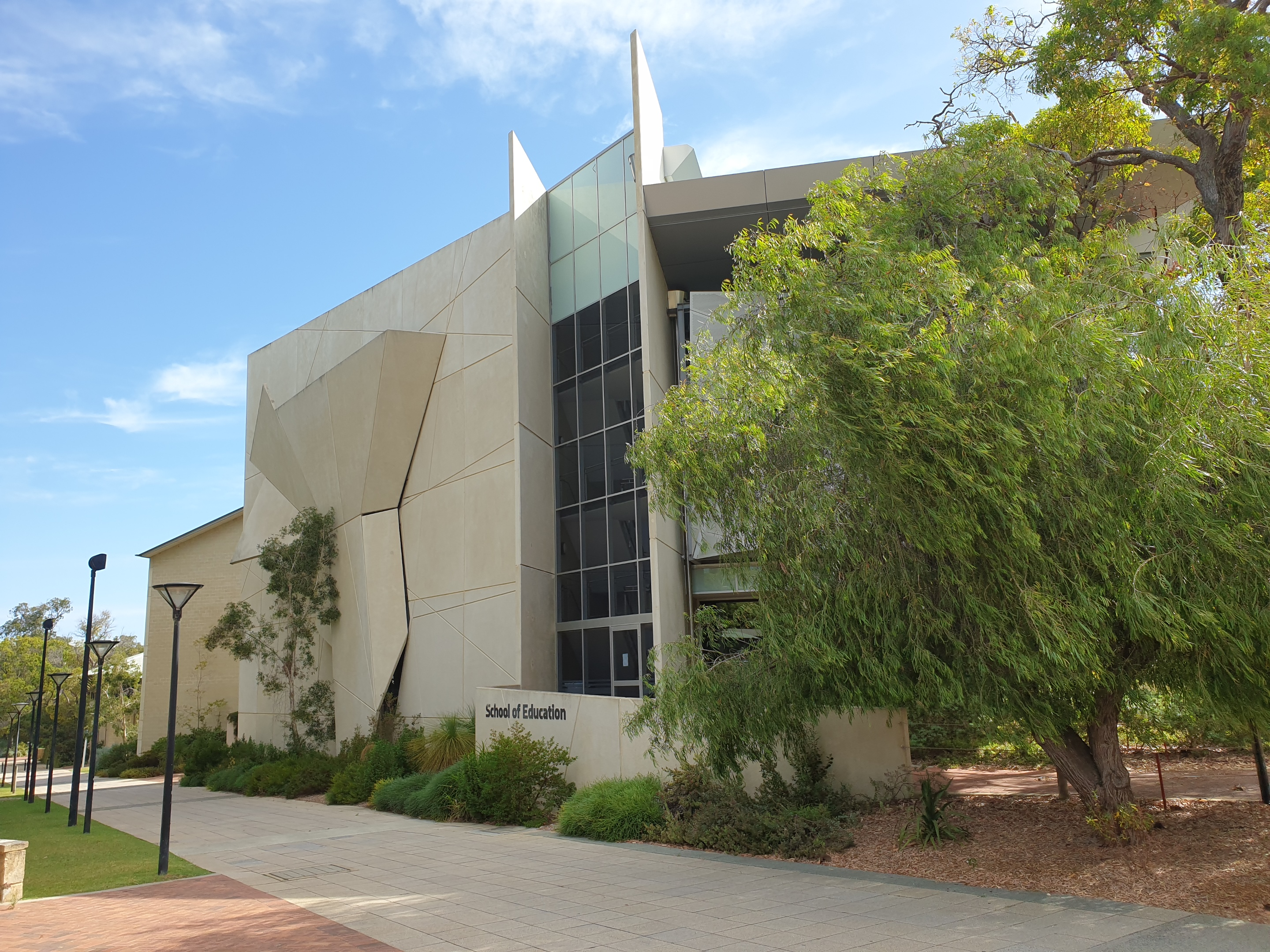
The School of Education. Teaching is one of its oldest specialisations.

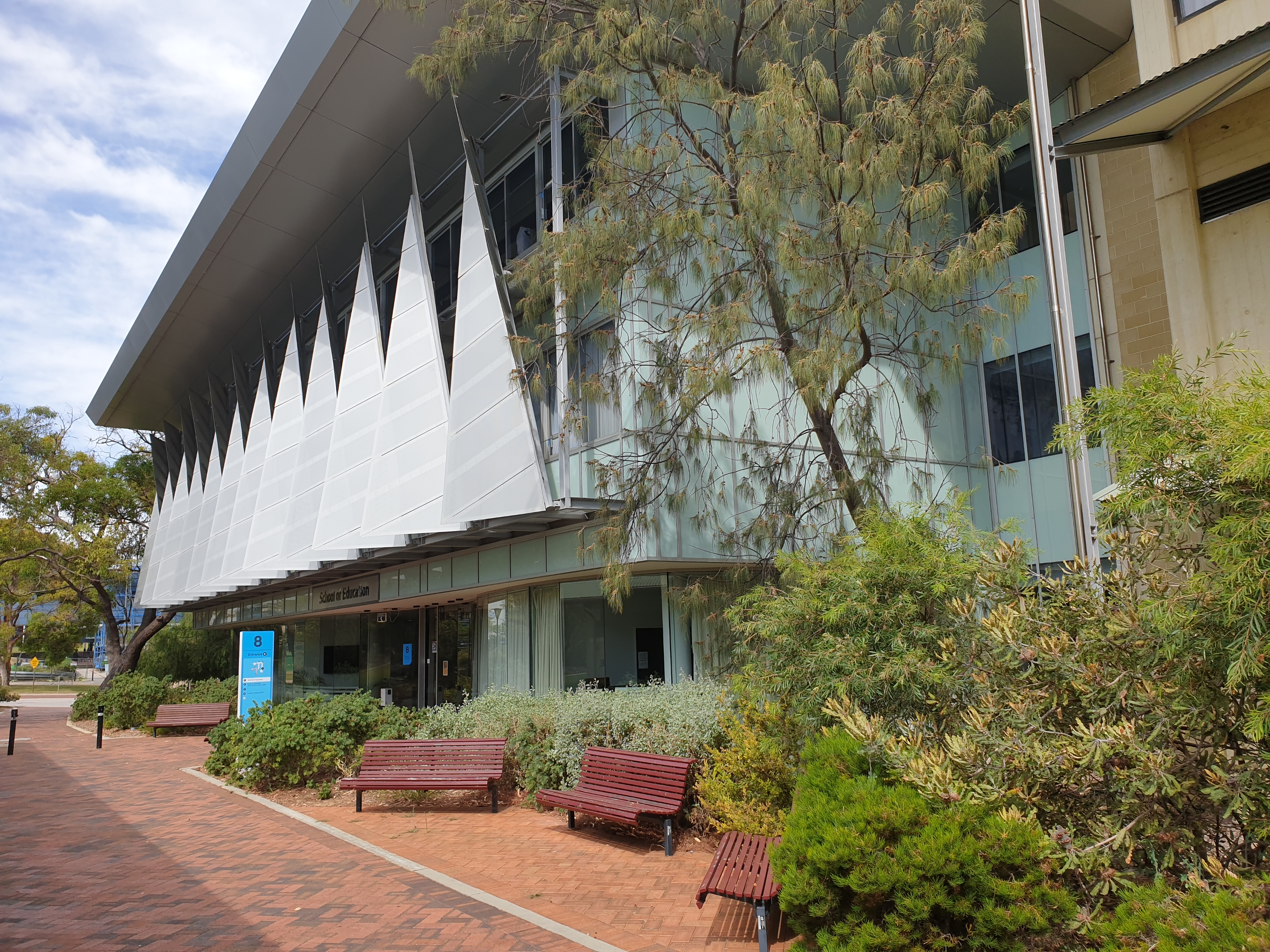
A School of Education building

School of Engineering

Broad disciplines: Full range of Engineering specialisations.

School of Medical and Health Sciences

Broad disciplines: Exercise and Health Sciences, Medical Science, Biomedical Science, Speech Pathology and Paramedicine.

School of Nursing and Midwifery

The School of Nursing and Midwifery was established in 1985 on the Nedlands campus of the Western Australian College of Advanced Education (WACAE), before the institution was renamed to Edith Cowan University. A majority of the practical placements for the nursing program was based at the nearby Sir Charles Gairdner Hospital. It expanded to the Bunbury campus in 1985 and fully moved to the Churchlands campus by October 1988 before becoming centralised at the newly built Joondalup campus. The ECU Churchlands campus continued graduating approximately 300 nursing students annually until December 2007, after which the campus was closed, but the Bunbury campus continued offering nursing and midwifery programs.

The inaugural Head of School is Margaret Baird, who served from September 1984 to December 1991, and was a former state president of the Australian Nurses Federation (ANF) and member of the Nurses Board. As of 2022, the ECU School of Nursing and Midwifery has the largest nursing cohort in Western Australia with 2,422 students and the only one with a double-degree program in both nursing and midwifery. It also offers postgraduate entry, education and research programs in nursing as well as the state's only nurse practitioner study program.

School of Science

The School of Science is based mainly at the Joondalup and Bunbury campuses and delivers undergraduate and postgraduate programs across science, mathematics, computing, and cyber security. Broad disciplines include environmental science, conservation biology, chemistry, data science, information technology, and cyber security. It is recognised for its strong emphasis on practical, industry-connected learning through Work Integrated Learning (WIL) placements in student's final semester.

The School of Science also delivers a range of STEM outreach programs for school students (including holiday programs) and the broader community that encourage participation in science and increase awareness of STEM study and career pathways. Some notable programs include

- LabRats,
- Summer of STEM,
- RACI's Australian National Titration Competition,
- PECAN+ Capture The Flag (CTF) Competition, and
- Events during Australia's National Science Week.

Western Australian Academy of Performing Arts

The Western Australian Academy of Performing Arts (or simply WAAPA) is notable for being the most comprehensive performing arts school in Australia by disciplines of study. It offers study and research programs in acting, screen performance, arts and cultural management, dance (classical ballet and contemporary dance), music (in various fields of instrumental and voice performance, composition and school teacher education), theatre (including directing and musical theatre), production (including production design, costume design, lighting, props and scenery, sound and stage management) and other fields of performing arts. It also offers a vocational program in Aboriginal performance and a Doctor of Philosophy (PhD) research program with an integrated "performance, exhibition, event or an embodiment of some form".

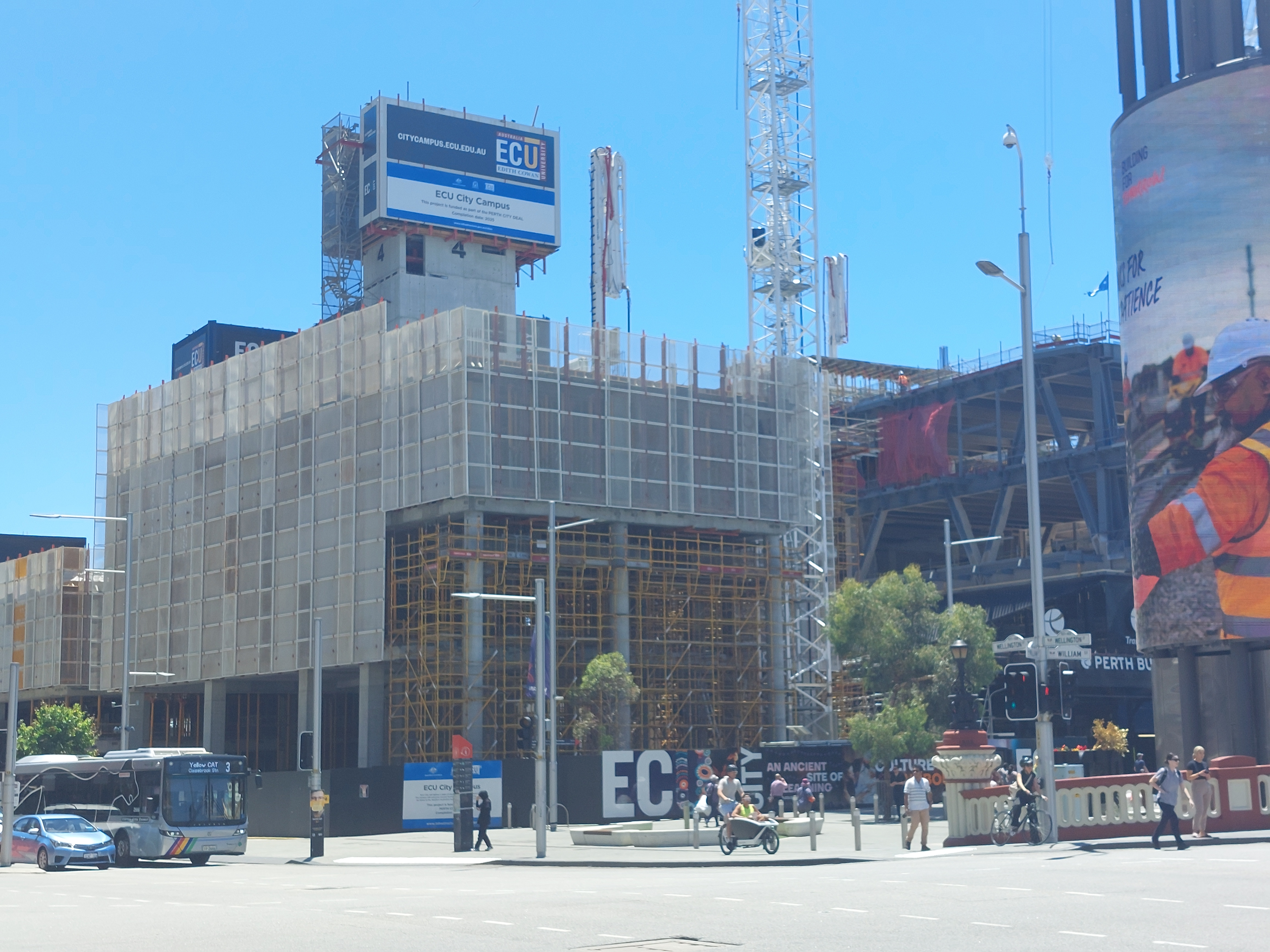
Construction on the ECU City campus as of late 2023, the future home of WAAPA among other schools

The performing arts school, which has produced some of Australia's most prominent figures in the performing arts, relocated to the City campus in early 2026. The ECU City campus, which is designed by Lyons and located west of Yagan Square, has six performance venues which host over 300 performances annually. The campus will be accessible by public transport, being built on top of the underground Perth Busport opposite the Perth railway station.

As of 2019, the executive dean of the school is David Shirley. Prior to being assigned, he was the director of the Manchester School of Theatre and chair of the Federation of Drama Schools in the United Kingdom.

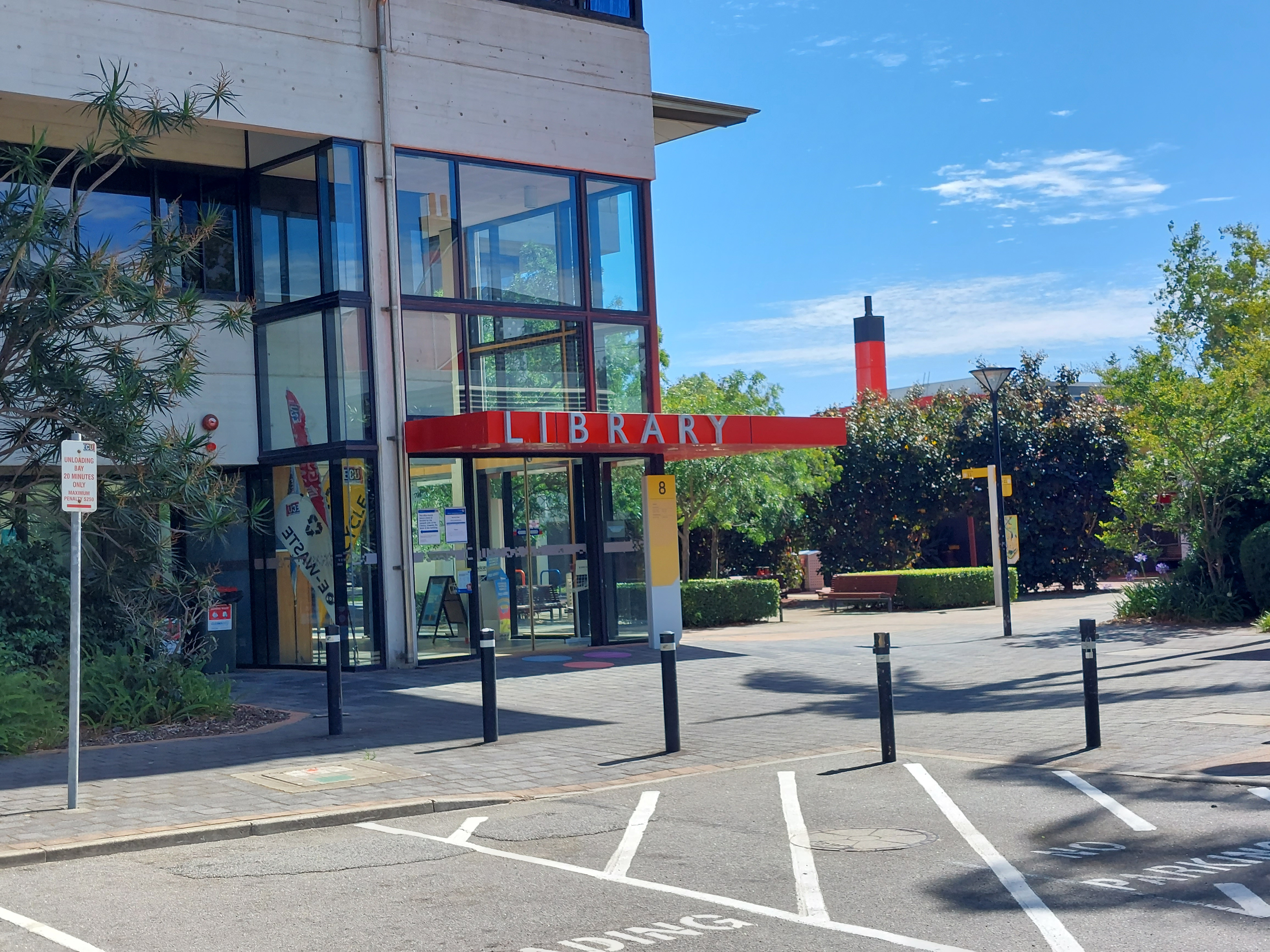
Entrance to the Mount Lawley campus library

=== Research centres ===
The university has a number of research centres within its areas of research strength: Health and Wellness; Education; Environment and Sustainability; Electronic Engineering and ICT; Social and Community; Business and Society; Communications and Creative Arts; and Security, Law and Justice. Several of these research centres are categorised as Major National Research Facilities and WA Centres of Excellence in Science and Innovation.

==== Business and society ====
- Centre for Innovative Practice
- Marketing and Services Research Centre

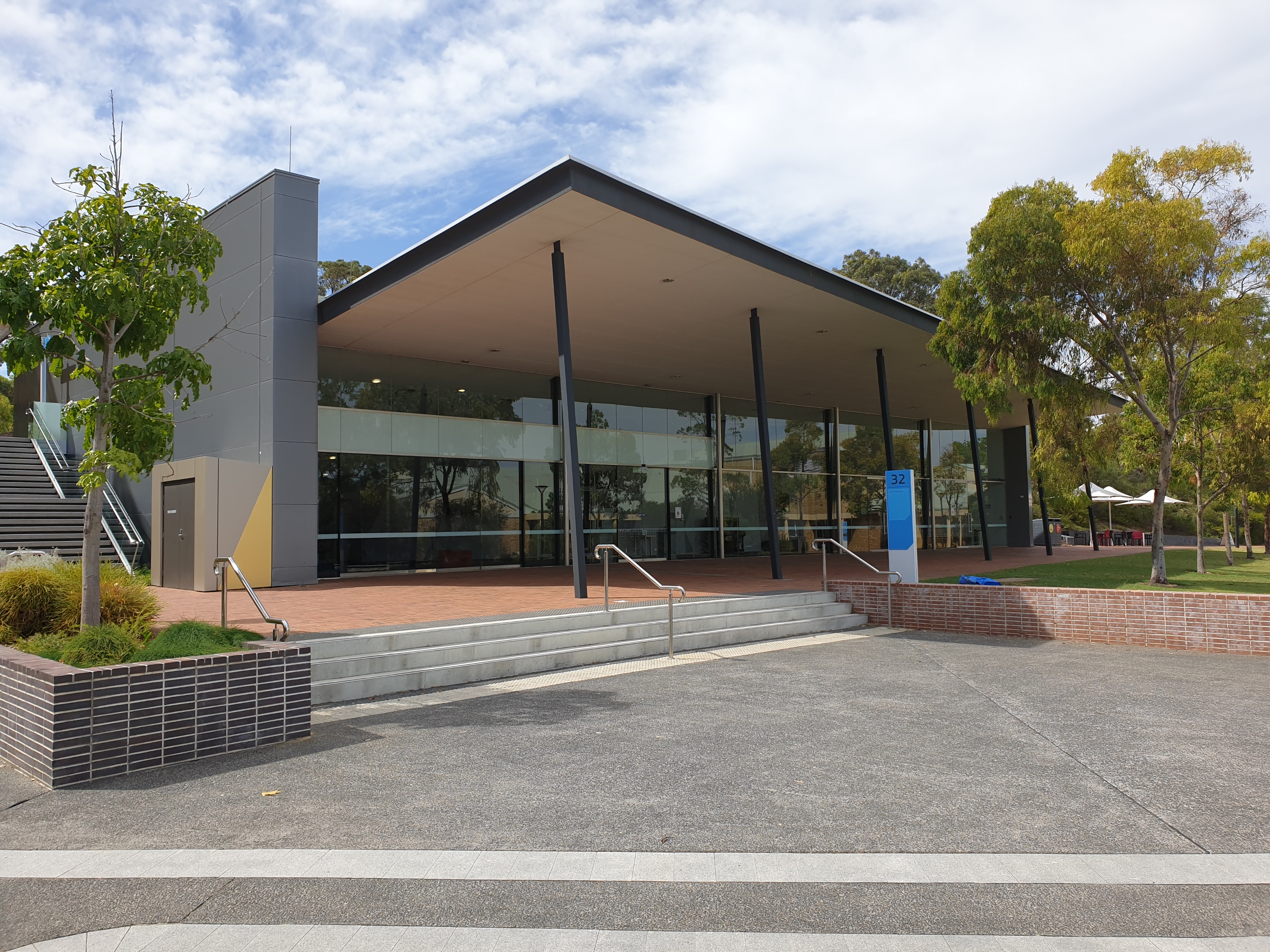
Building 32 on the Joondalup campus, home to a number of lecture theatres

==== Communications and creative arts ====
- Centre for Research in Entertainment, Arts, Technology, Education and Communications
- Dance Research Centre – Western Australian Academy of Performing Arts

==== Education ====
- Centre for Schooling and Learning Technologies
- Edith Cowan Institute for Education Research
- Fogarty Learning Centre

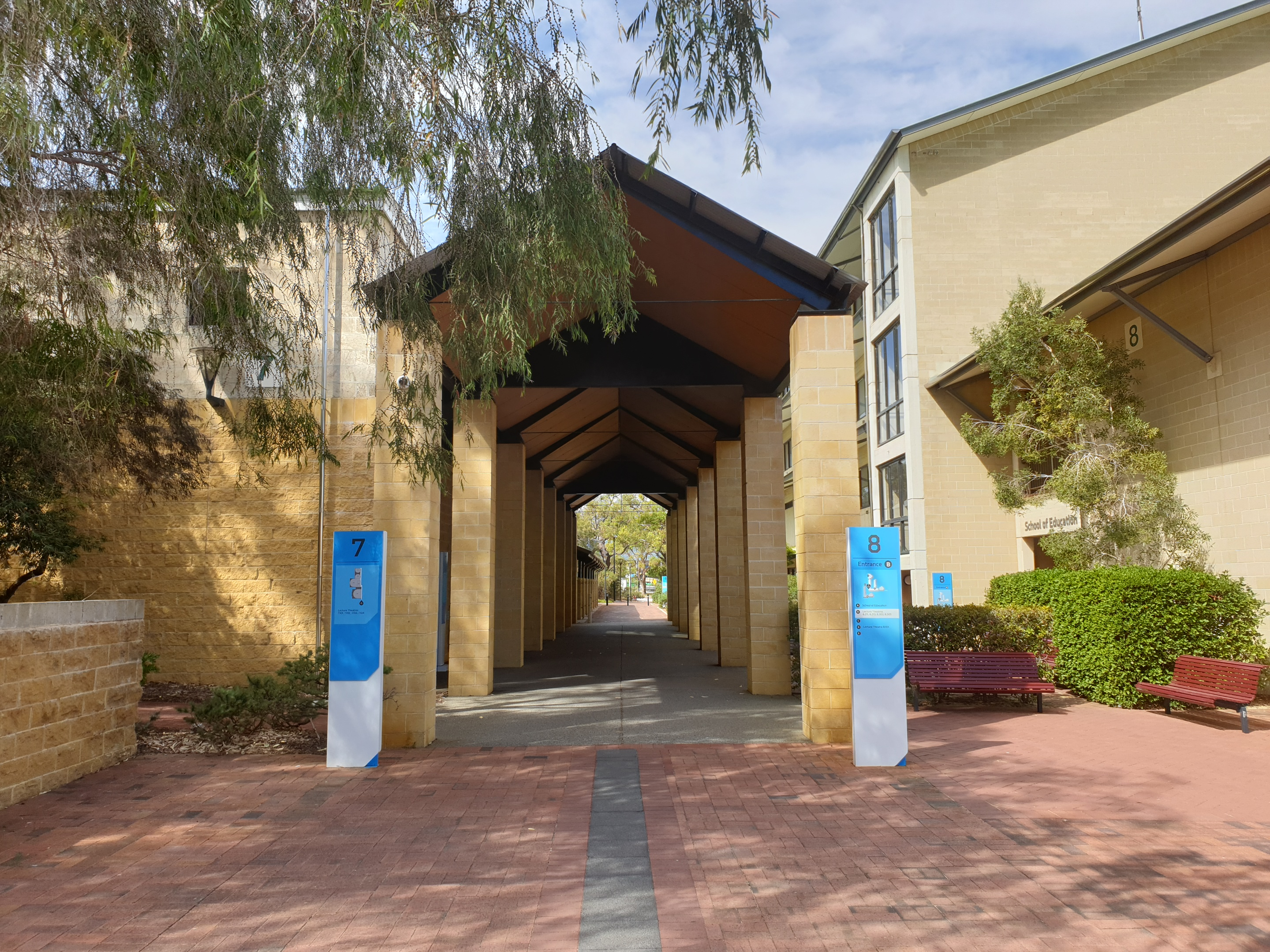
A covered pathway leading to lecture theatres and the School of Education

==== Engineering and ICT ====
- Australian Institute of Nuclear Science and Engineering (AINSE)
- Centre for Communications Engineering Research
- Electron Science Research Institute
- National Networked Tele-Test Facility for Integrated Systems
- The Western Australian Centres for Microscopy/Nanoscale Characterisation
- Centre for Artificial Intelligence and Machine Learning (CAIML)

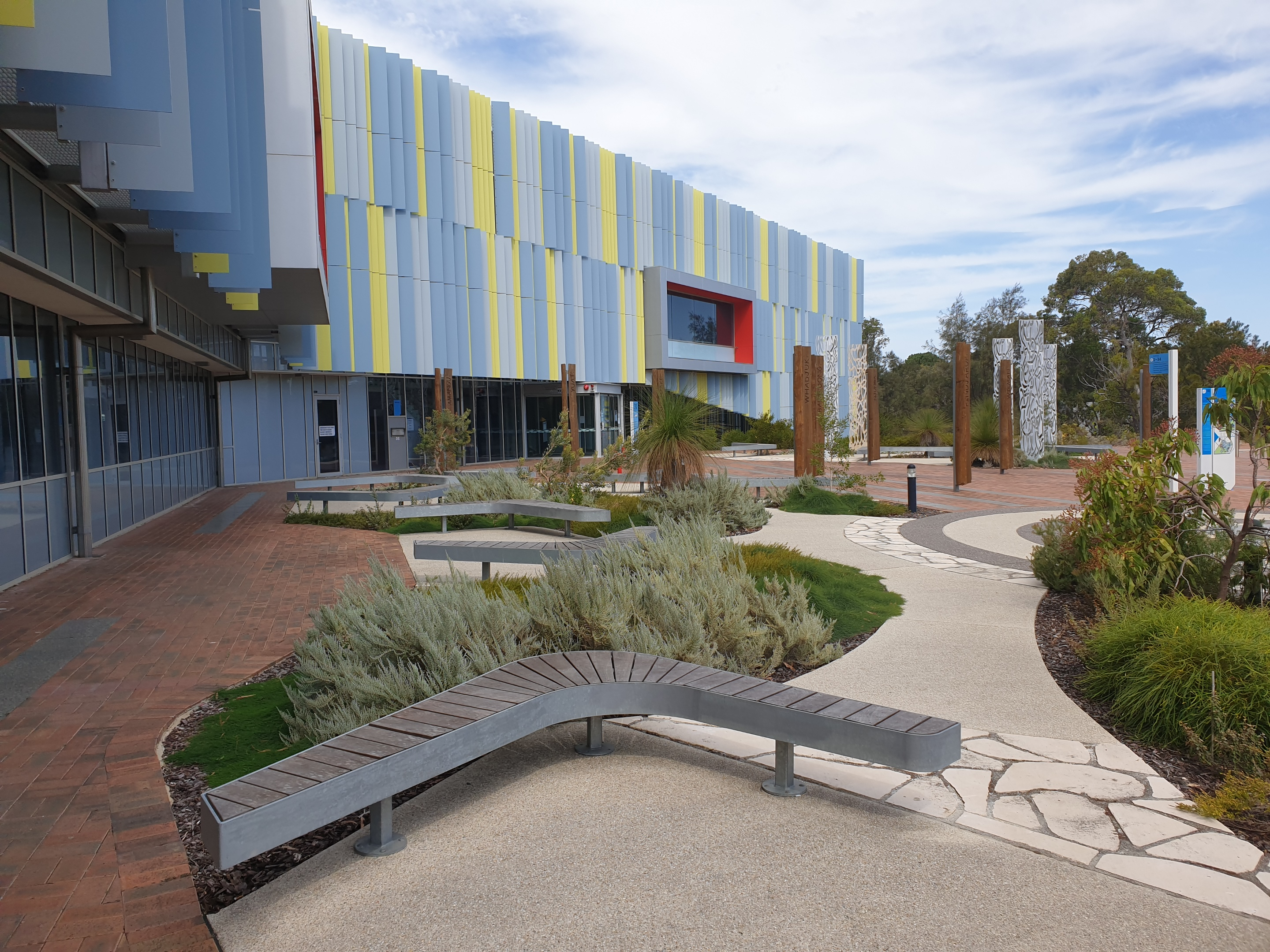
Library on the Joondalup Campus

==== Environment and sustainability ====
- Conservation and Biodiversity Research Centre (CBRC)
- Centre for Marine Ecosystems Research (CMER)
- Centre for People, Place and Planet (CPPP)

==== Health and wellness ====
- Australian Indigenous HealthInfoNet
- Centre of Excellence for Alzheimer's Disease Research and Care
- Exercise and Sports Science Research Group
- Melanoma Research
- The Systems and Intervention Research Centre for Health
- Exercise Medicine Research Institute (EMRI)
- Western Australian Centre of Excellence for Comparative Genomics

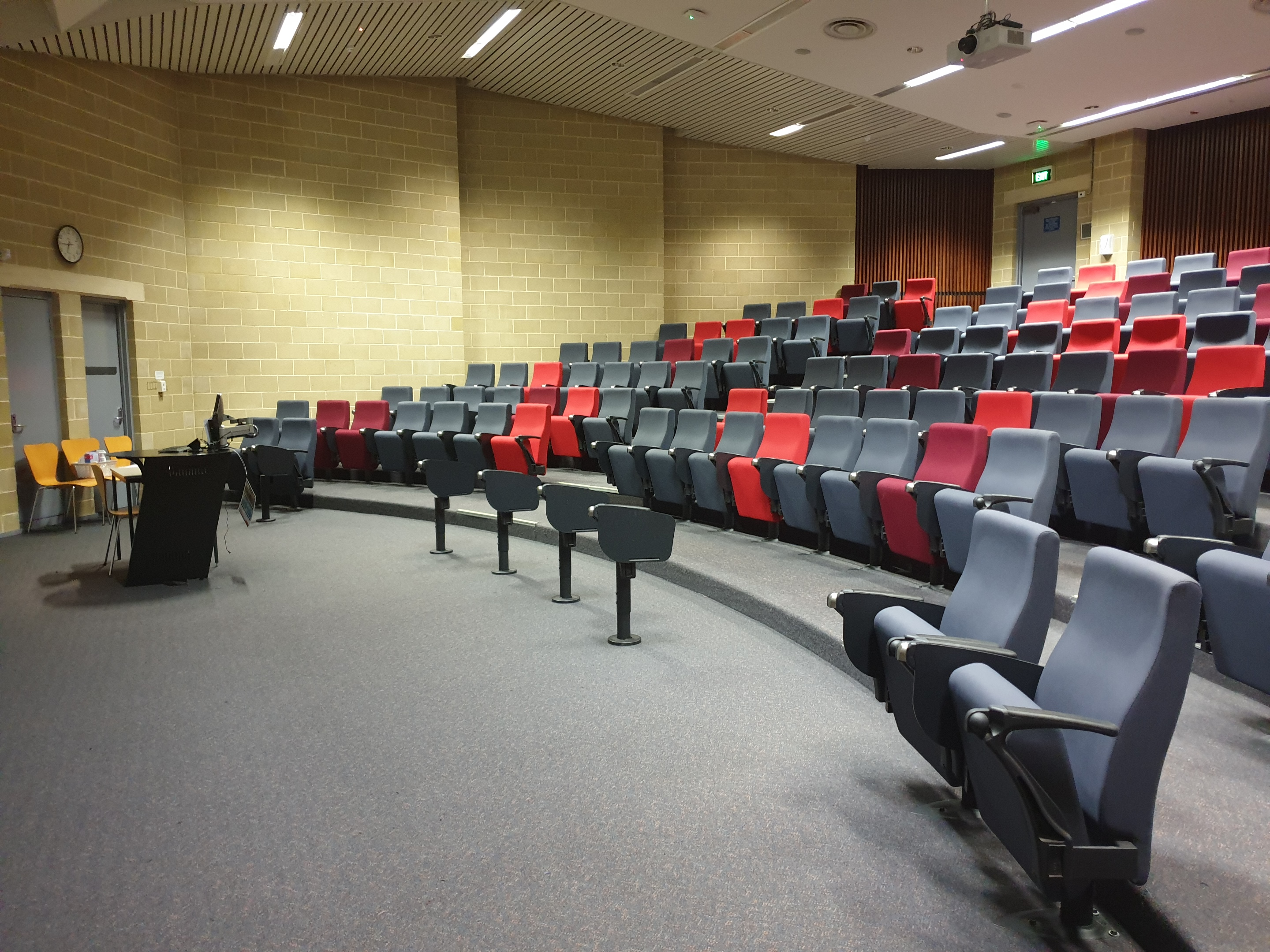
One of several lecture theatres in Building 7 on campus

==== Security, law and justice ====
- ECU Security Research Institute
- Sellenger Centre for Research in Law, Justice and Social Change

=== Vice-chancellors and chancellors ===
Clare Pollock commenced as vice-chancellor in September 2024. Previous vice-chancellors include Steve Chapman (2015–2024), Kerry Cox (2006–2014), Millicent Poole (1997–2005) and Roy Lourens (1991–1997).

Robert French was the inaugural chancellor (1991–1997). In August 2024, Gaye McMath was elected the sixth chancellor. Previous chancellors include Robert Nicholson (1997–2004), Hendy Cowan (2004–2018), Kerry Sanderson (2019–2021) and Denise Goldsworthy (2022–2024).

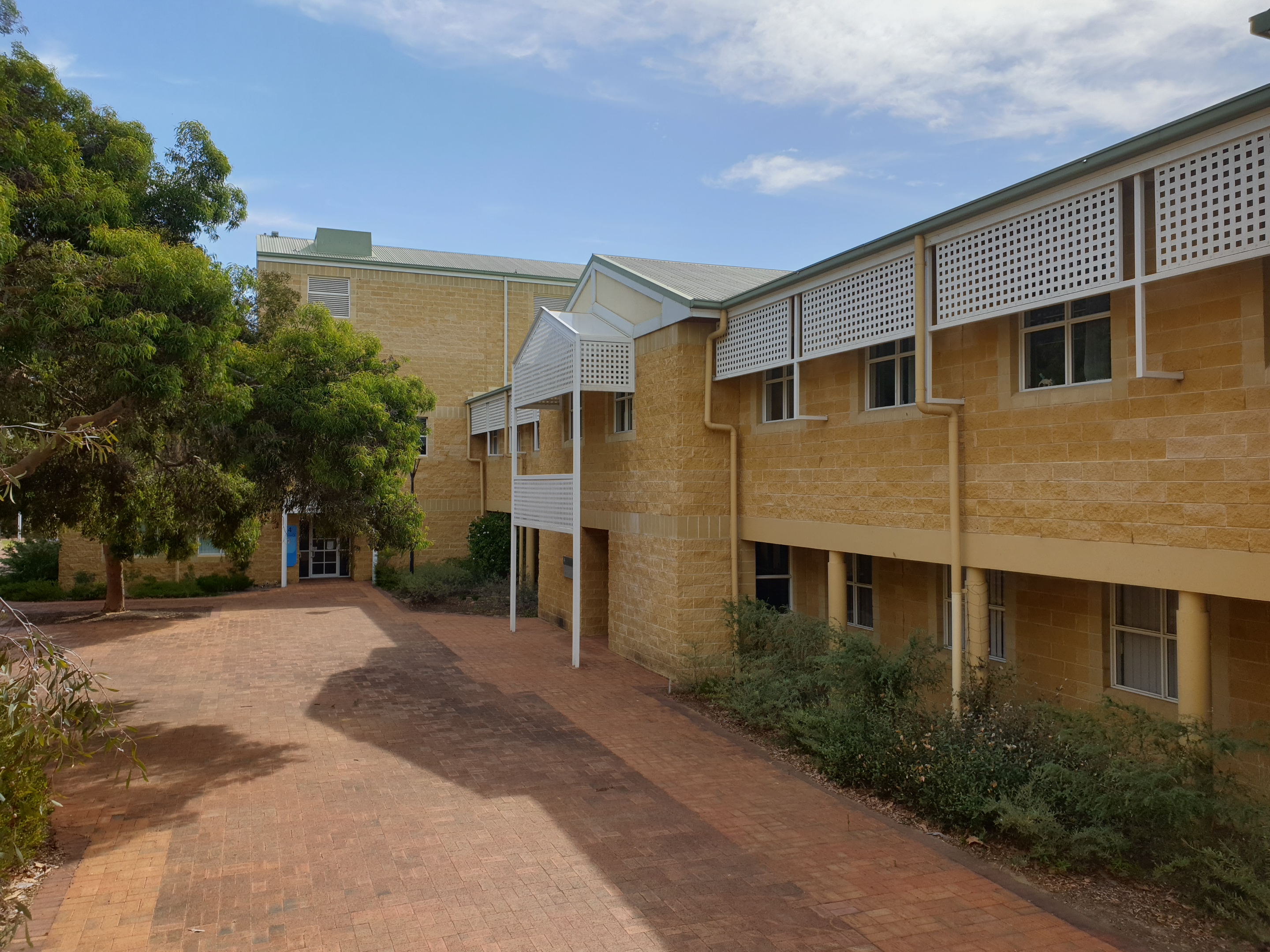
A pathway surrounded by limestone buildings on the Joondalup campus

=== Governing council ===
The University Council is the governing body of the organisation which controls and manages the operation, affairs, concerns and property of the university, in accordance with its Corporate Governance Statement.

The membership of the council is composed of people across various disciplines and groups as mandated under Part III, Sect. 9 of the Edith Cowan University Act 1984. Its membership includes persons appointed by the Governor of Western Australia, co-opted members, members of the academic and general staff of the university as elected by the members of these groups, and alumni and student guild representatives. With the exception of the Chancellor and students, members of council are elected for three-year terms, or in the case of a by-election for the balance of the current term. An elected member of the council may serve for up to three consecutive terms, after which they are subject to a twelve-month break before they may be reconsidered for council. Students elected to the University Council hold office for a term of one year from the date their election takes effect, and are not eligible for re-election more than once.

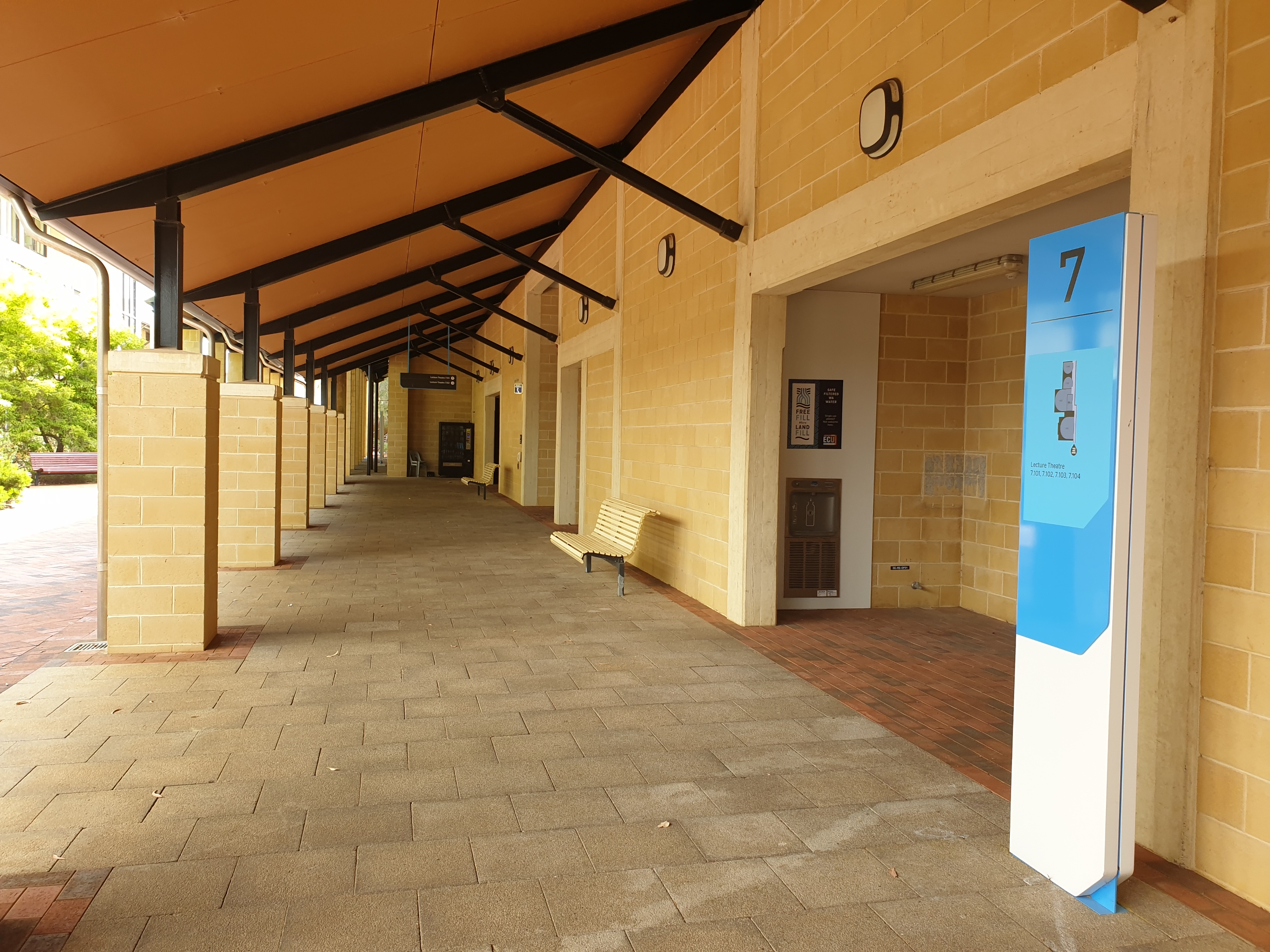
Lecture theatres along Building 7

== Campuses ==
ECU currently has three campuses, consisting of two metropolitan campuses at Joondalup and in the Perth CBD (ECU City), and one at Bunbury, in Western Australia's South West region. Programs are also offered at regional centres throughout Western Australia. A fourth campus at Mount Lawley ceased classes in late 2025 and will be vacated by the end of 2027.

=== Current ===
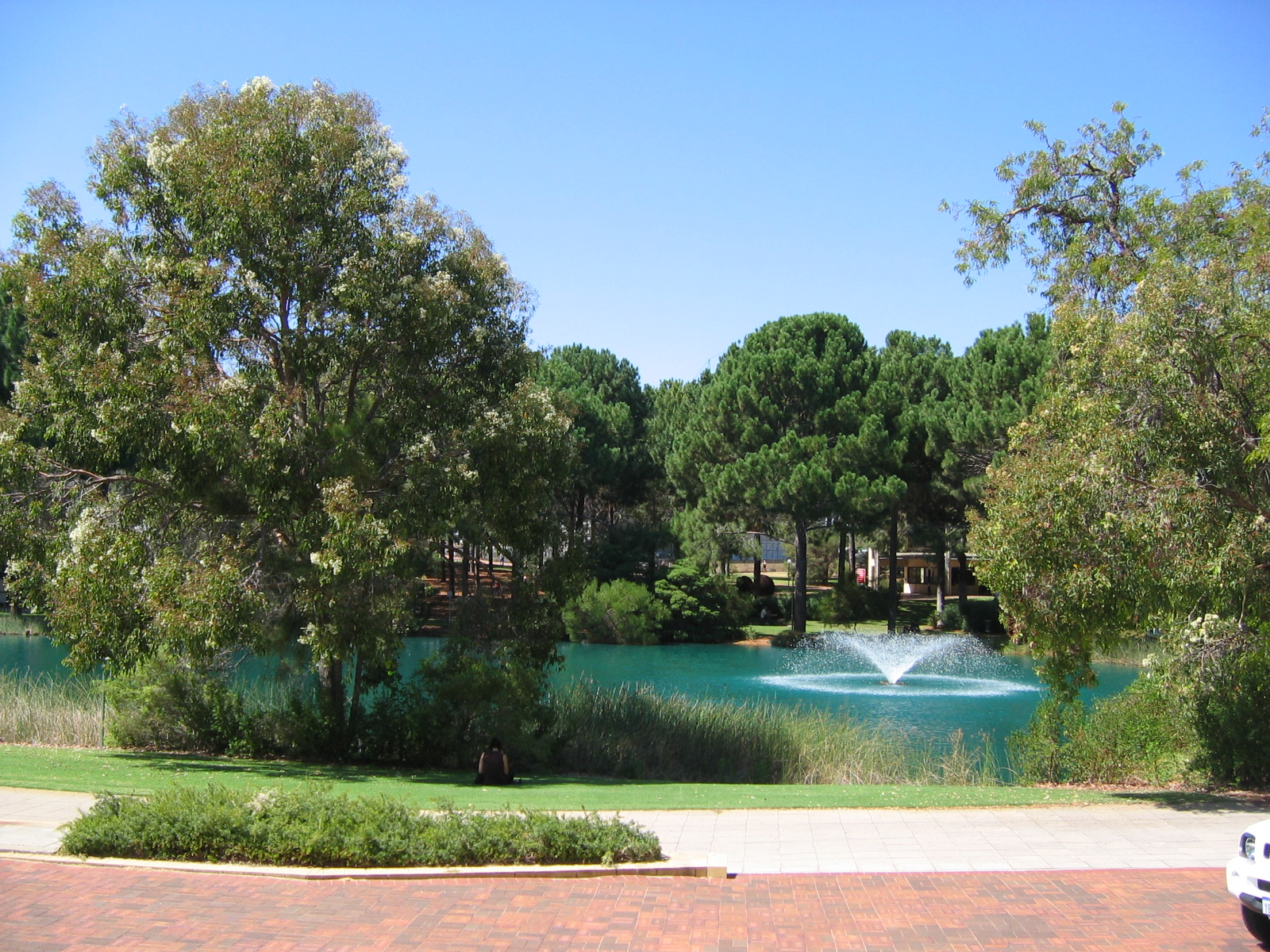
Joondalup Pines park and lake forms part of the university quadrangle

The Joondalup Campus is the University's headquarters. Facilities on the campus includes a Health and Wellness Building, a multimillion-dollar sport and fitness centre, an award-winning library and student hub, an outdoor cinema screening Telethon Community Cinemas at the Joondalup Pines during the summer months and on-campus accommodation. The campus also forms part of the Joondalup Learning Precinct, which includes the West Coast College of TAFE to the north and the Western Australian Police Academy to the northeast. It is serviced by the Joondalup CAT and is close to the Mitchell Freeway.

ECU City is situated immediately west of Yagan Square, above the Perth Busport and near Perth railway station, located in the CBD. The campus commenced classes in February 2026.

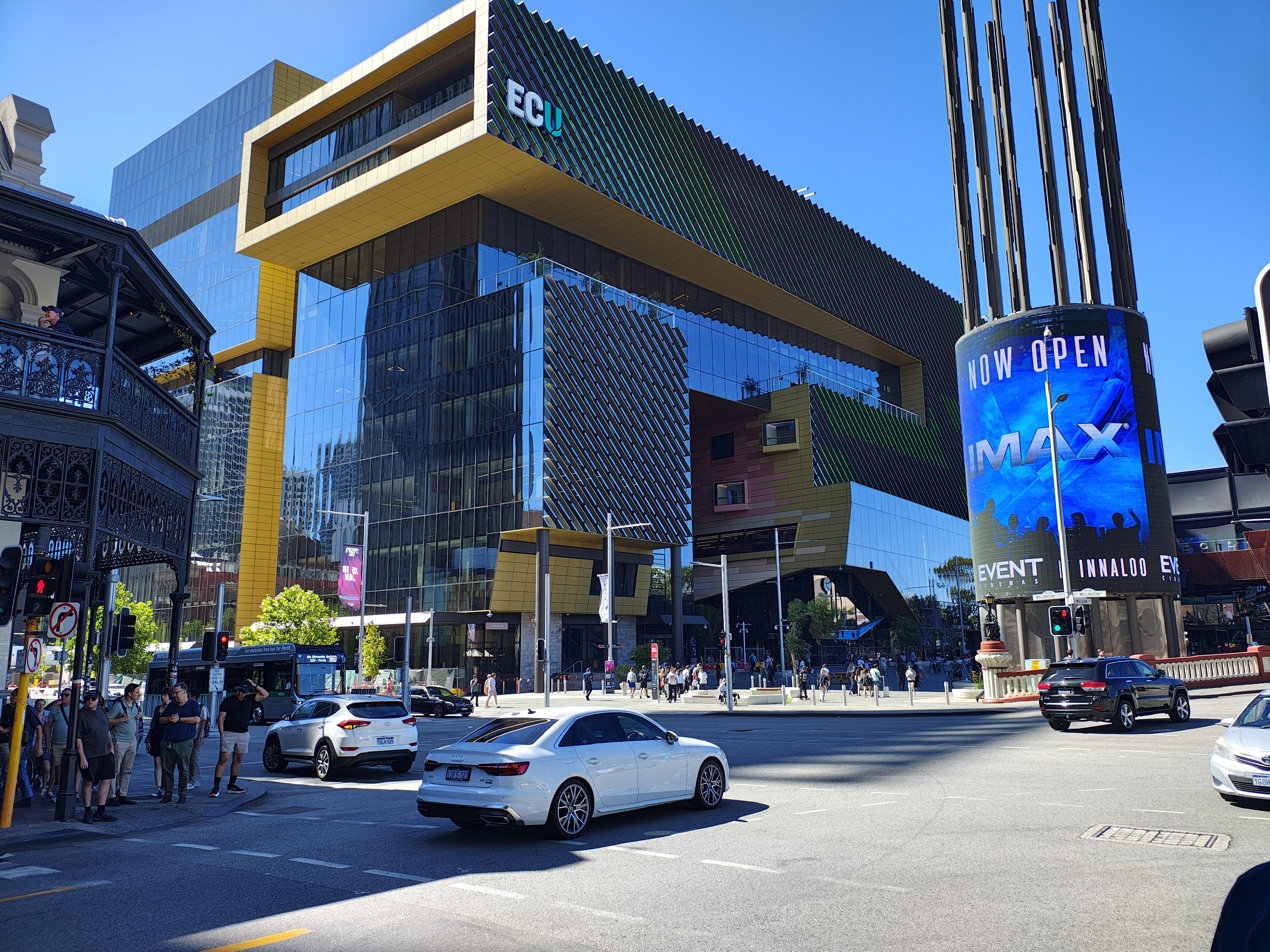
ECU City Campus

The South West Campus is located in Bunbury, two hours drive south of Perth. The South West Campus (Bunbury) is the largest university campus outside the metropolitan area and is part of an educational precinct comprising South West Institute of Technology and the Bunbury Health Campus which includes St John of God Hospital and South West Area Health Services. The campus has modern facilities, small class sizes, a cafe, and a common room. In addition, a comprehensive range of courses and on-campus accommodation is available.

Many classes have recently been shifted to online to cater to overseas students.

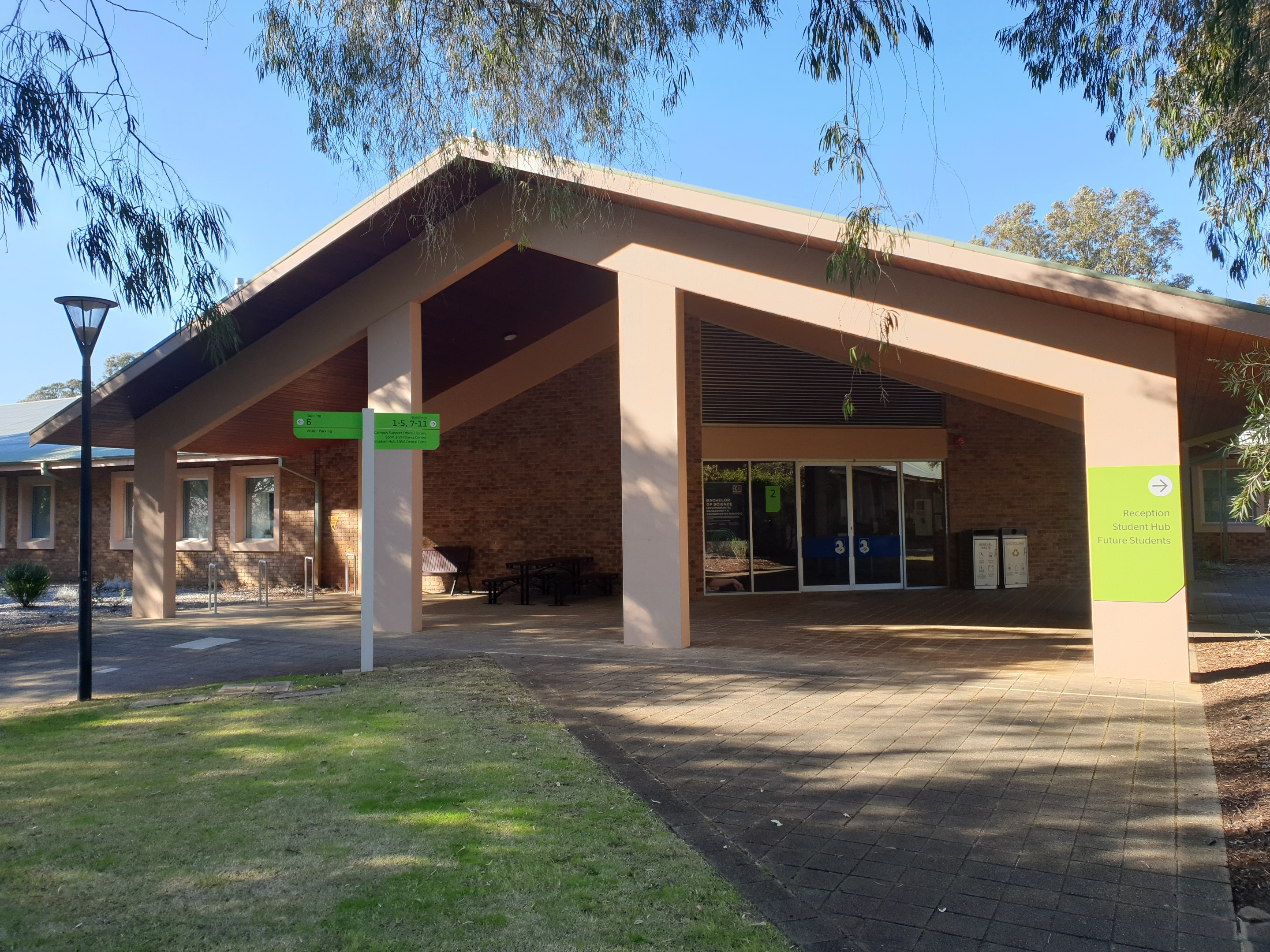
A building on the Bunbury campus

=== Former ===
The Mount Lawley Campus formed part of the Mount Lawley education precinct with Mount Lawley Senior High School. Along with being the former home of WAAPA, Mount Lawley Campus also included a sport and fitness centre and on-campus accommodation. As a result of the opening of ECU City, teaching at the Mount Lawley campus concluded after semester 2, 2025. The site will then be vacated and handed back to the state government for redevelopment by late 2027. The redevelopment would see the establishment of a creative industries hub using the former WAAPA facilities as well as the university's former library and administration building. In addition the student housing would be retained while the rest of the campus will be demolished and redeveloped to make way for residential housing and a primary school. The site, which was partially constructed on a former landfill, will require remediation. It is expected to ultimately accommodate approximately 1,000 homes, with the first intended to be completed in 2030.

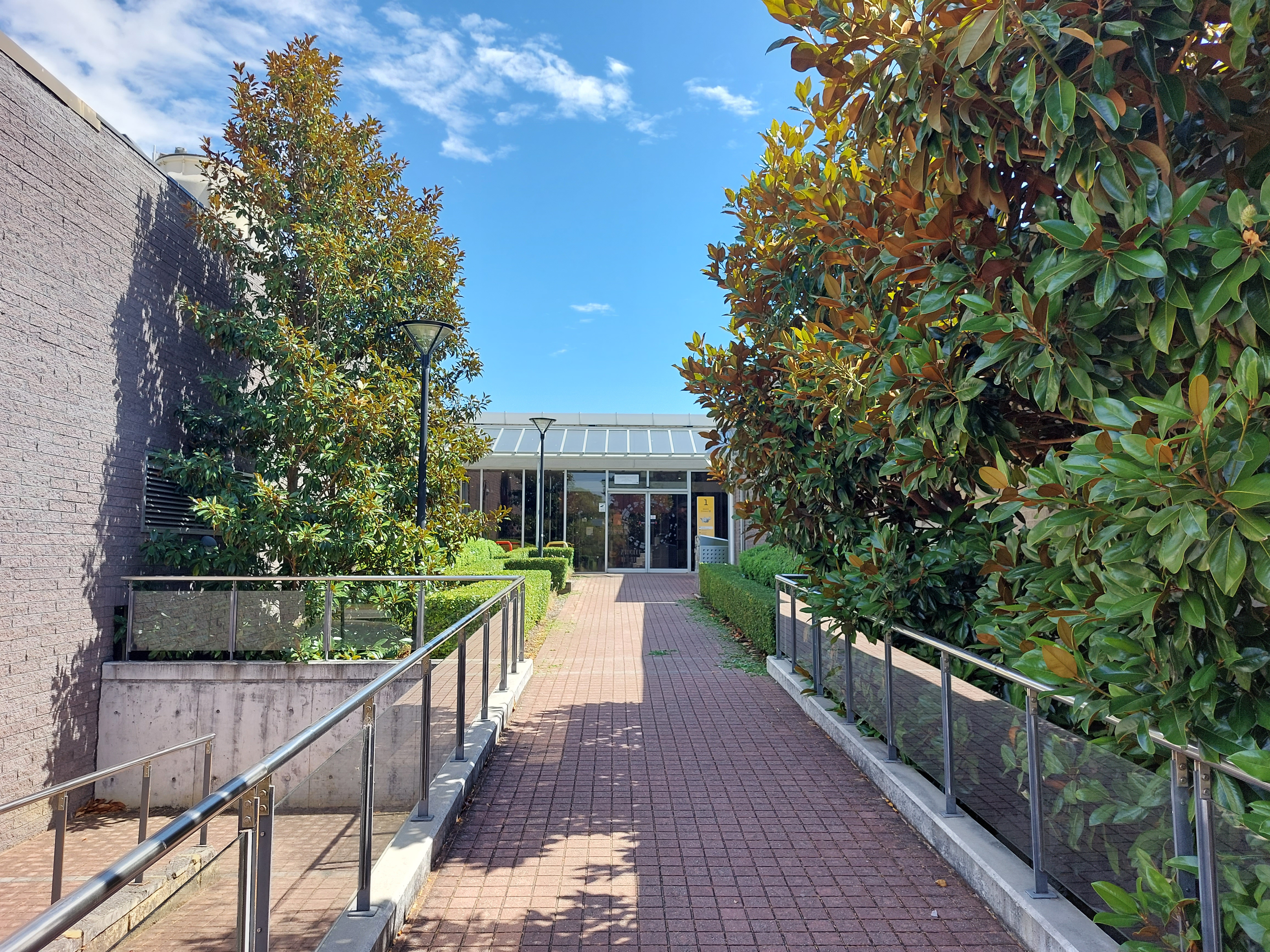
An entrance to the Mount Lawley campus, former home to WAAPA

The university formerly also had three campuses in Perth's western suburbs – Churchlands, Claremont and Nedlands. These campuses were closed down with the Churchlands Campus becoming a residential estate in 2006, and the Nedlands and Claremont campuses being acquired by the University of Western Australia in 1990 and 2004 respectively. Previously, a Graylands campus was merged into Claremont, Churchlands and Mount Lawley in 1979 before the formation of WACAE.

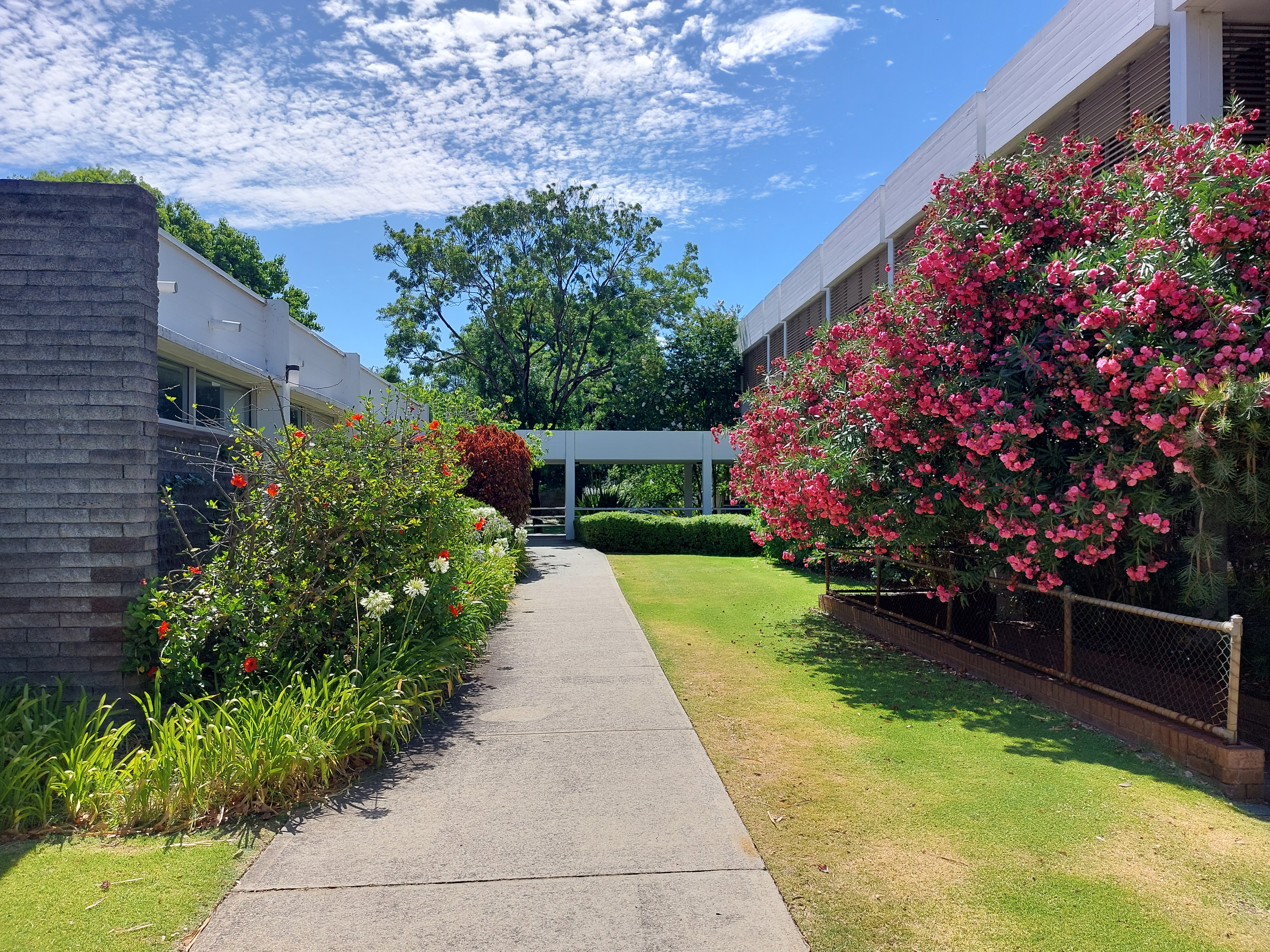
A pathway between buildings on the Mount Lawley campus

=== Other facilities ===
In 2014 the university opened the ECU Health Centre on Dundebar Road in Wanneroo. The Centre includes the Wanneroo GP Super Clinic, ECU Psychological Services Centre, pharmacy, and allied health practitioners.

In 2020, the university opened their SuperLabs, a five-level science building featuring the largest permanent periodic table in the world. The periodic table is 662 square meters, spanning the entire side of the building, and can be seen from inside through the windows. Each lab in the building can fit 96 students, each with their own spot on a bench and a detachable touchscreen computer to complete their lab work digitally.

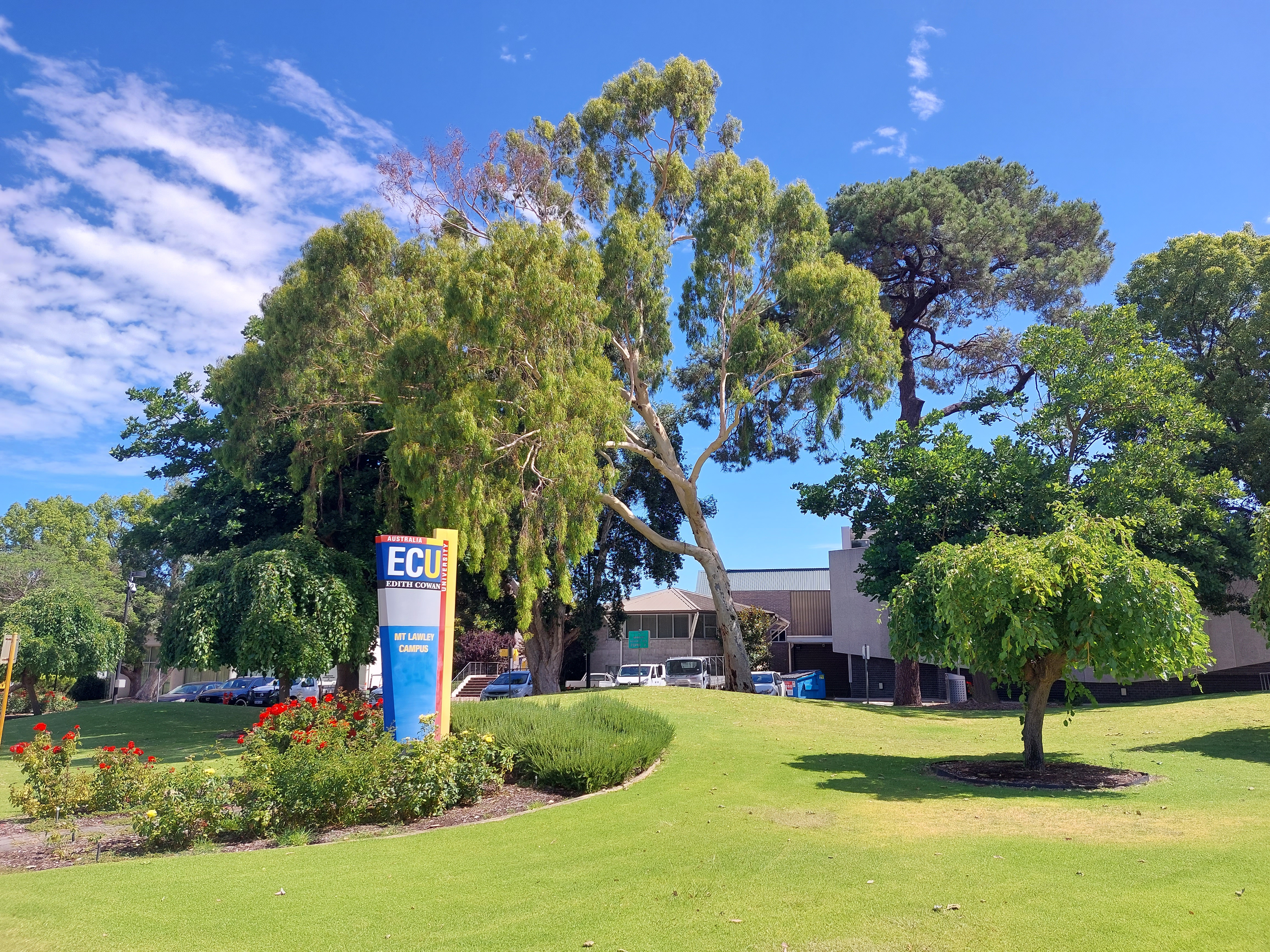
Facade of the Mount Lawley campus with surrounding gardens

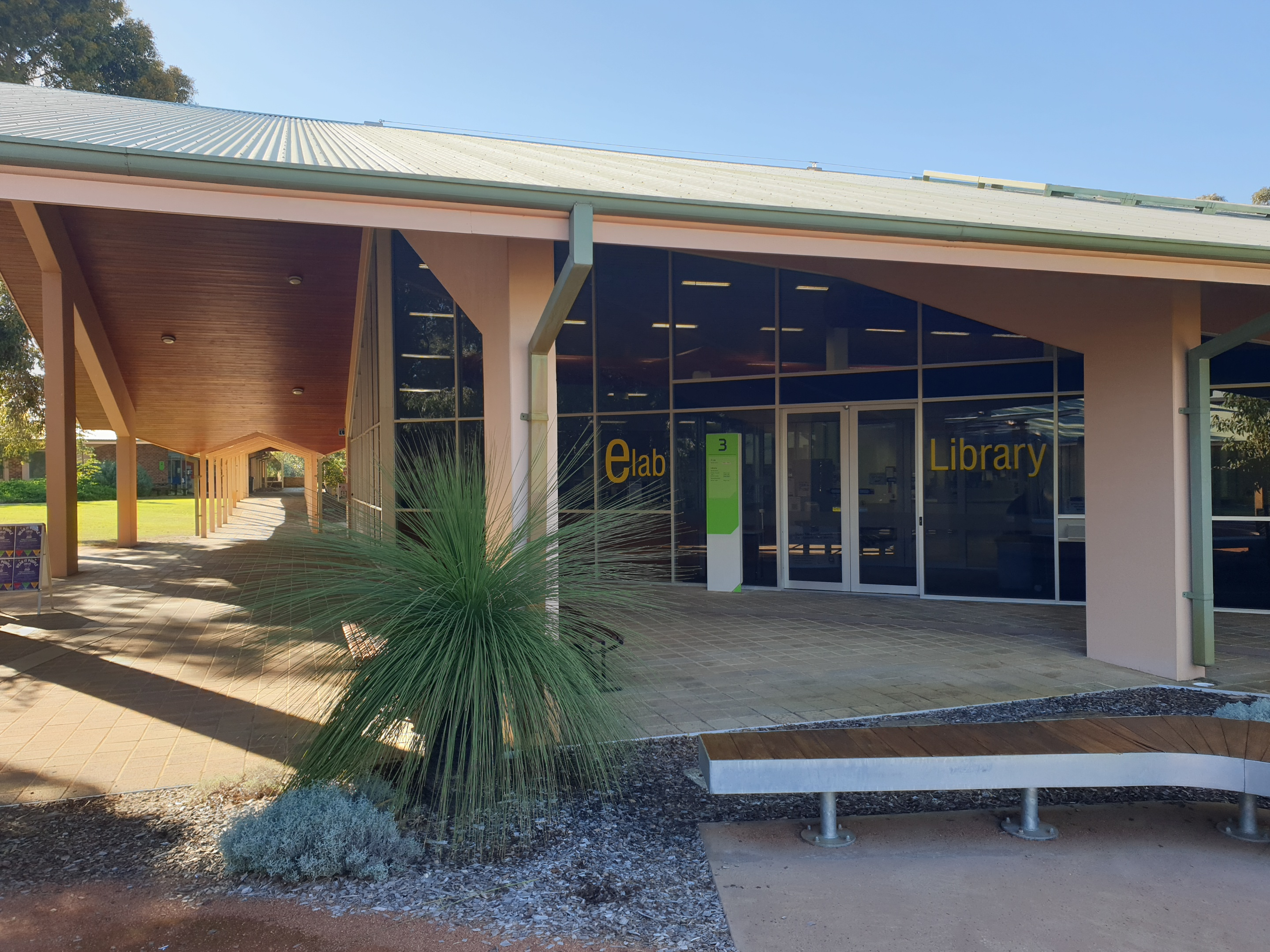
Entrance to the Bunbury campus library

== Academic profile ==
Study programs are offered at undergraduate and postgraduate levels in numerous subject areas, including a number of vocational education courses offered by the Western Australian Academy of Performing Arts. The university also offers a number of University Preparation Courses which prepare students for undergraduate study, including a summer program following WACE graduations, and a Doctor of Philosophy (PhD) program among other higher degrees by research. A number of courses offered are not available in other universities in Western Australia. This includes undergraduate paramedical studies, a double degree program in nursing and midwifery, various major subjects in secondary education and the performing arts, nurse practitioner and paramedic practitioner study programs, aeronautics and naval engineering.

The university also has a close working relationship with the University of Portsmouth, with whom it offers dual degree programs with integrated overseas study where students are enrolled in and graduate from both institutions. These include programs in biomedical science, environmental science, security studies, psychological sciences, media and communication studies, sports science and management. The university also has partnerships with several education institutions to conduct courses and programs offshore in countries such as China (including Hong Kong), Singapore, Sri Lanka and Vietnam. The university also has student exchange partnerships with approximately 90 universities overseas, including the Utrecht Network, and a joint environmental studies program with the Tokyo City University.

=== Academic reputation ===
University rankings

Global – Overall
- ARWU World: 801–900 (2025)
- CWTS World: 1024 (Note: The CWTS Leiden Ranking is based on P (top 10%).) (2024)
- QS World: =487 (2026)
- THE World: 351–400 (2026)
- USNWR Global: =457 (25/26)

National – Overall
- ARWU National: 28–29 (2025)
- CWTS National: 25 (2024)
- ERA National: 32 (2018)
- QS National: 26 (2026)
- THE National: 23–25 (2026)
- USNWR National: 26 (25/26)
- AFR National: 13 (2025)

In the 2024 Aggregate Ranking of Top Universities, which measures aggregate performance across the QS, THE and ARWU rankings, the university attained a position of #398 (27th nationally).

National publications

In the Australian Financial Review Best Universities Ranking 2025, the university was ranked #13 amongst Australian universities.

Global publications

In the 2026 Quacquarelli Symonds World University Rankings (published 2025), the university attained a tied position of #487 (26th nationally).

In the Times Higher Education World University Rankings 2026 (published 2025), the university attained a position of #351–400 (tied 23–25th nationally).

In the 2025 Academic Ranking of World Universities, the university attained a position of #801–900 (tied 28–29th nationally).

In the 2025–2026 U.S. News & World Report Best Global Universities, the university attained a tied position of #457 (26th nationally).

In the CWTS Leiden Ranking 2024, the university attained a position of #1024 (25th nationally).

=== Student outcomes ===
The Australian Government's QILT (Note: Abbreviation for Quality Indicators for Learning and Teaching.) conducts national surveys documenting the student life cycle from enrolment through to employment. These surveys place more emphasis on criteria such as student experience, graduate outcomes and employer satisfaction than perceived reputation, research output and citation counts.

In the 2023 Employer Satisfaction Survey, graduates of the university had an overall employer satisfaction rate of 83.2%.

In the 2023 Graduate Outcomes Survey, graduates of the university had a full-time employment rate of 77.1% for undergraduates and 91.1% for postgraduates. The initial full-time salary was A$72,000 for undergraduates and A$97,000 for postgraduates.

In the 2023 Student Experience Survey, undergraduates at the university rated the quality of their entire educational experience at 81.7% meanwhile postgraduates rated their overall education experience at 83.1%.

== Student life ==
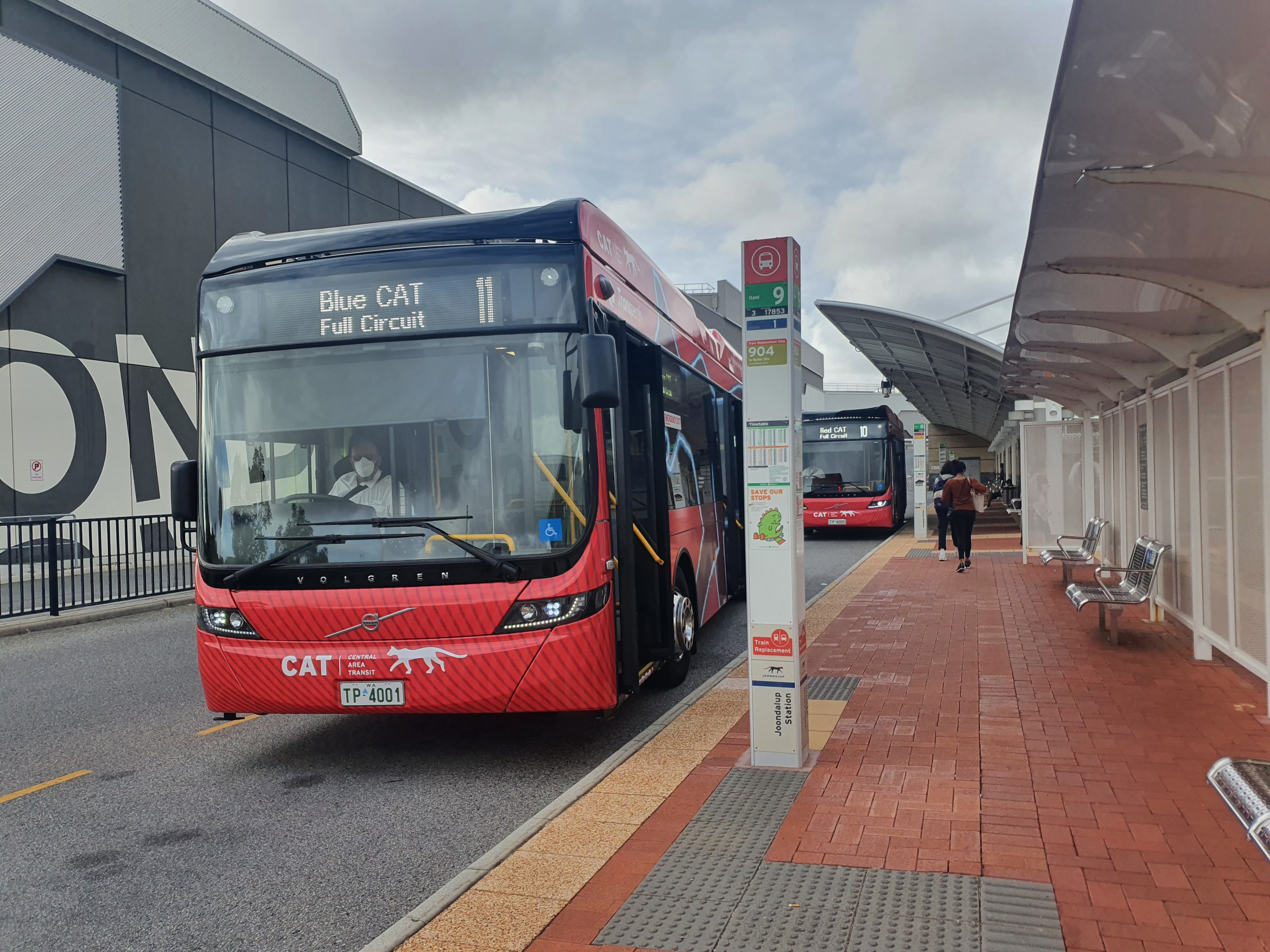
Joondalup CAT buses, departing to or arriving from the university

=== Enrollment ===
ECU has more than 31,000 students at both undergraduate and postgraduate levels. More than 6,000 international students originating from more than 100 countries study with ECU each year. This includes the offshore delivery of a variety of courses in a number of countries, student and staff exchange programs with other universities, joint research activities, international consultancies and individual academic links.

=== Guilds and student associations ===
All students are represented by the ECU Student Guild. This includes postgraduate students, under the Postgraduate Studies Department, and International students under the International Students' Council.

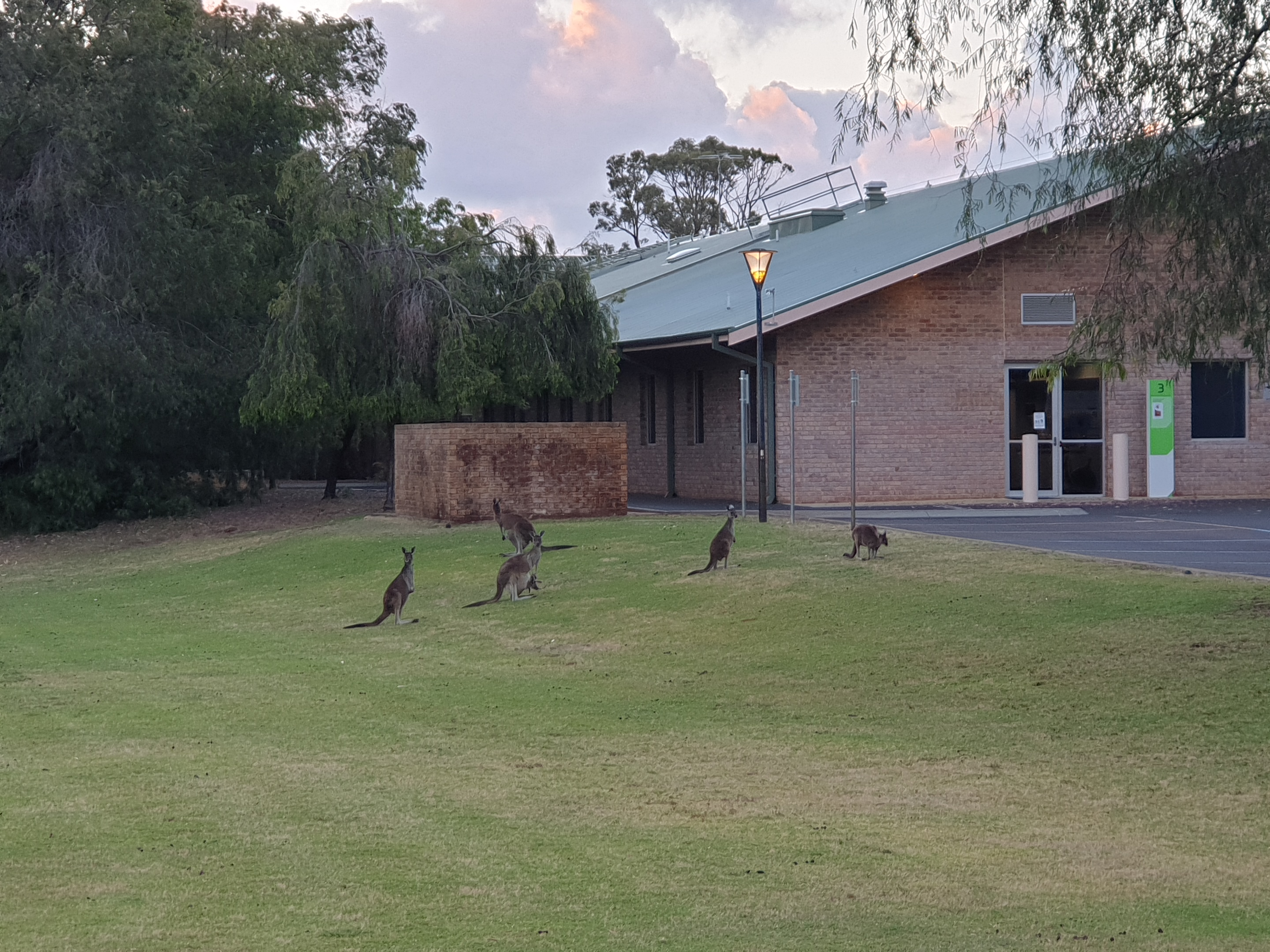
Kangaroos on the university's regional Bunbury campus

There are a range of academic groups and associations for undergraduate students of particular disciplines, including: Boomerang@ECU (Advertising); Dead Pilot's Society Superseded by Edith Cowan Aviators (ECA) as found on the social networking site Facebook; ECU Engineers (EEC); ECU Society of Psychology and Social Science (ECUSPSS); Sports Science @ ECU; Town Planning Student Association; ECU Nurses; Society Of Security Science (SOSS); NorthLaw Society (NLS); ECU Public Relations Chapter; Computer and Security Science Association (CASSA); ML Education (Primary Education); Early Childhood Collective and Arts Management Student Organisation (AMSO); Western Australian Student Paramedics (WASP) and more.

Along with the student associations, there are various social and sporting clubs that are affiliated with ECU Sport or the Guild. Some of these include: ECU Cars & Cruises, ECU Badminton Club, Tennis Club, ECU Liberal Club, Jack of Arts, Enactus, Buddhist Youth Club, ECU Parties and Events, Humans vs Zombies, Nerd Space, ECU Cheerleading Club, ECU Quidditch Club, The Sound, Touch Football, Mixed Netball, and more.

== Notable people ==
Edith Cowan University has alumni notable in their field, and notable staff and faculty both past and present, including its constituent schools and former campuses.

=== Alumni ===
As of 2024, Edith Cowan University has alumni notable in their field from six of its eight teaching schools.

Arts and Humanities
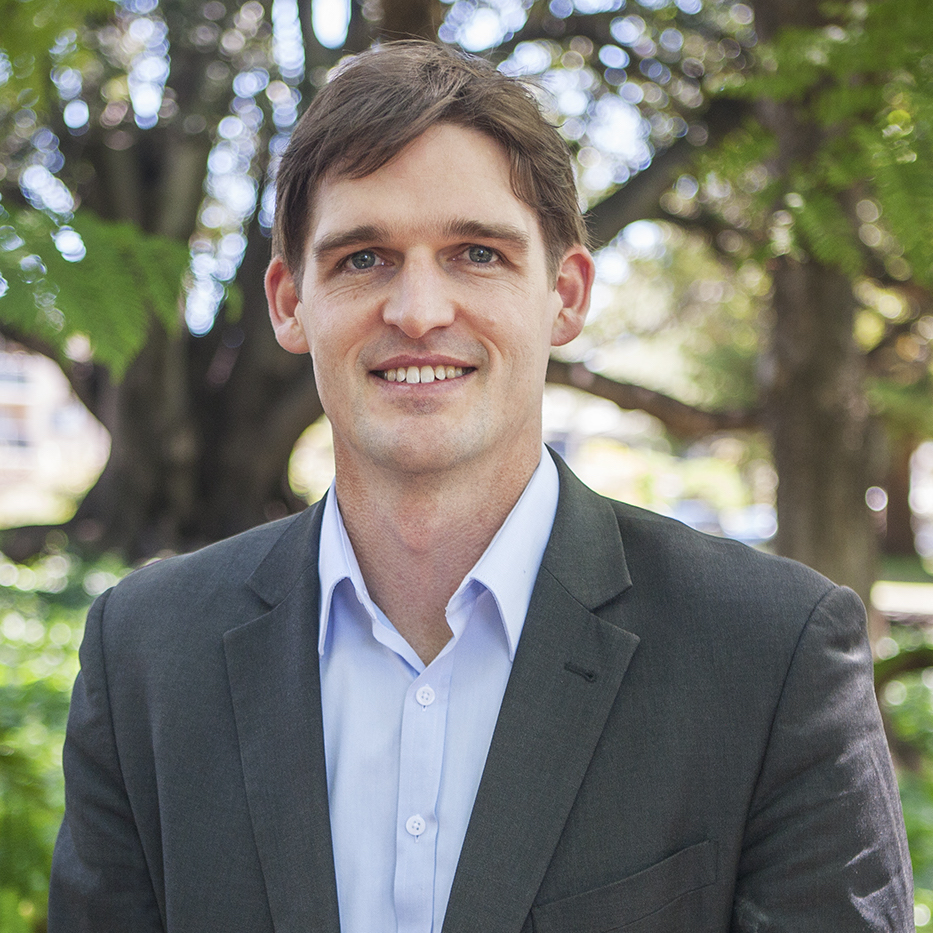
Tim Clifford
Australian politician
Business and Law
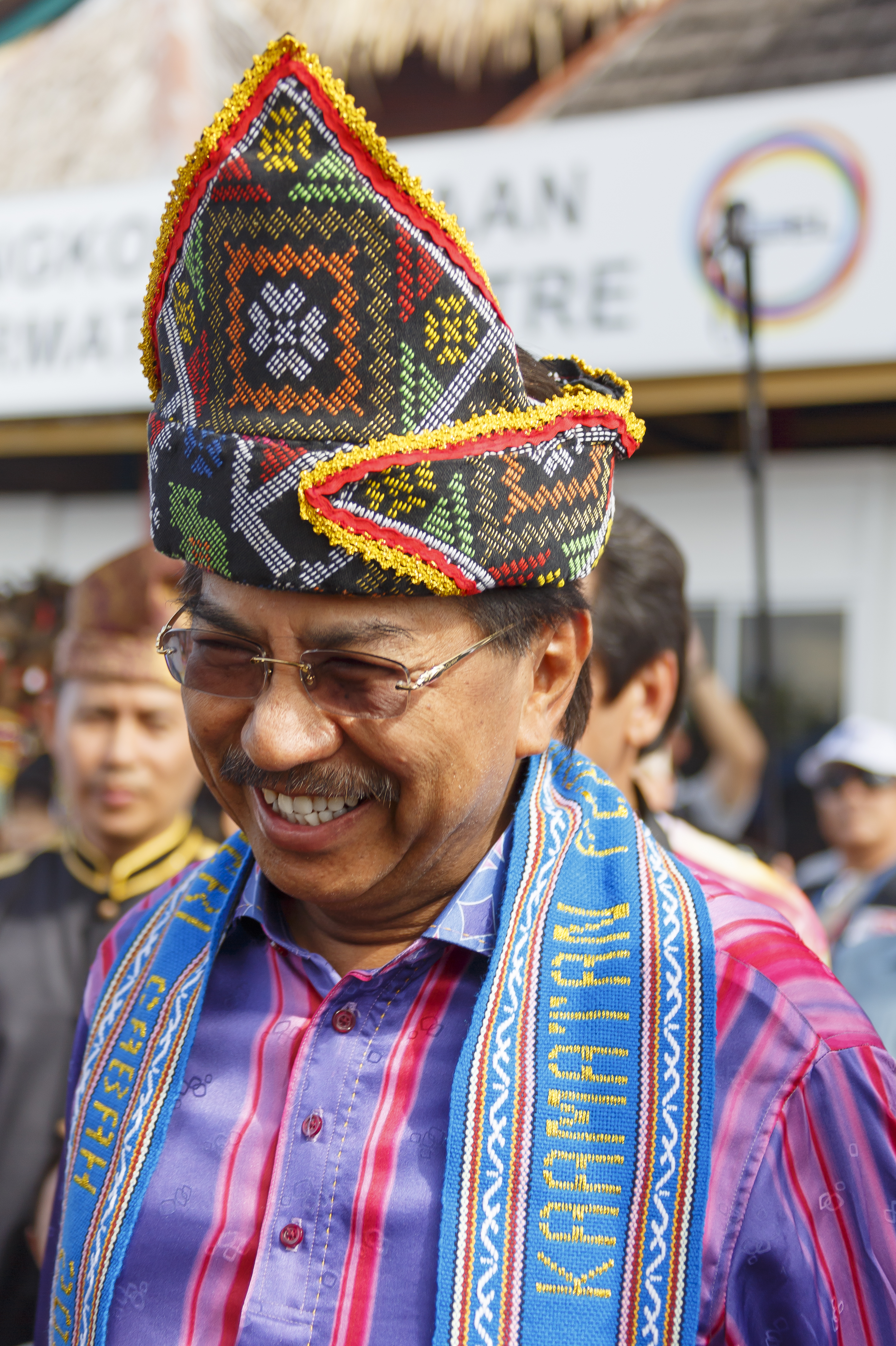
Musa Aman
Malaysian politician

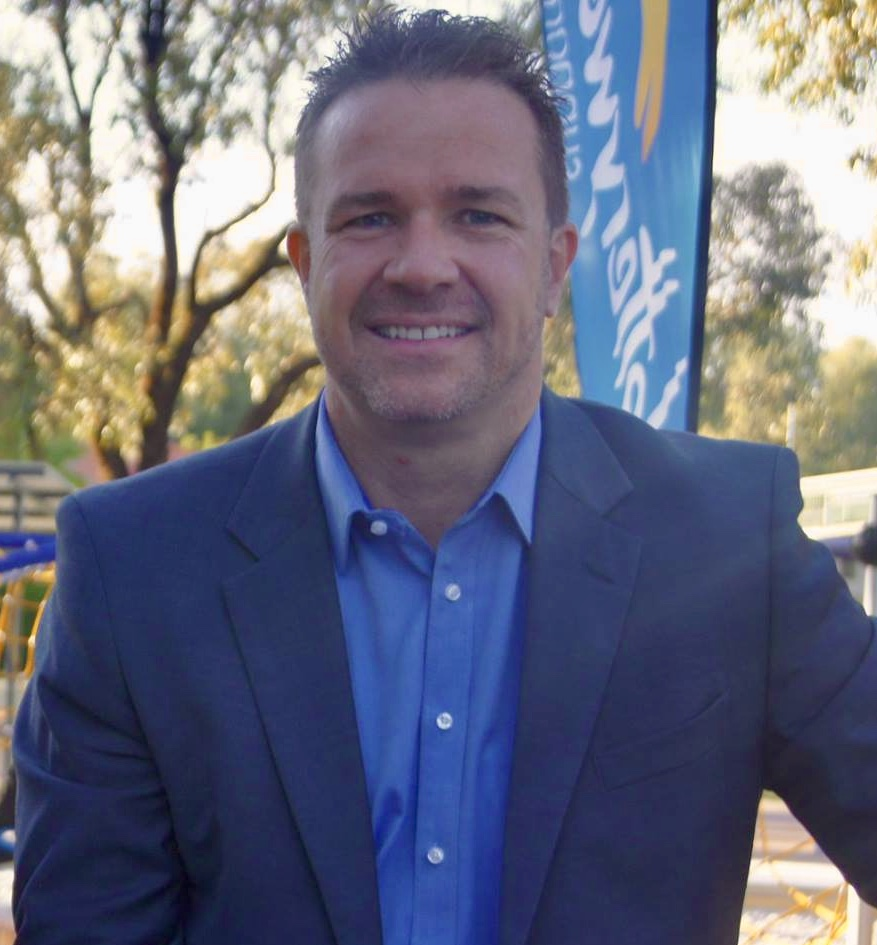
Troy Pickard
Politician and businessman
Education
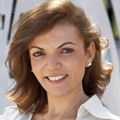
Anne Aly
Australian politician

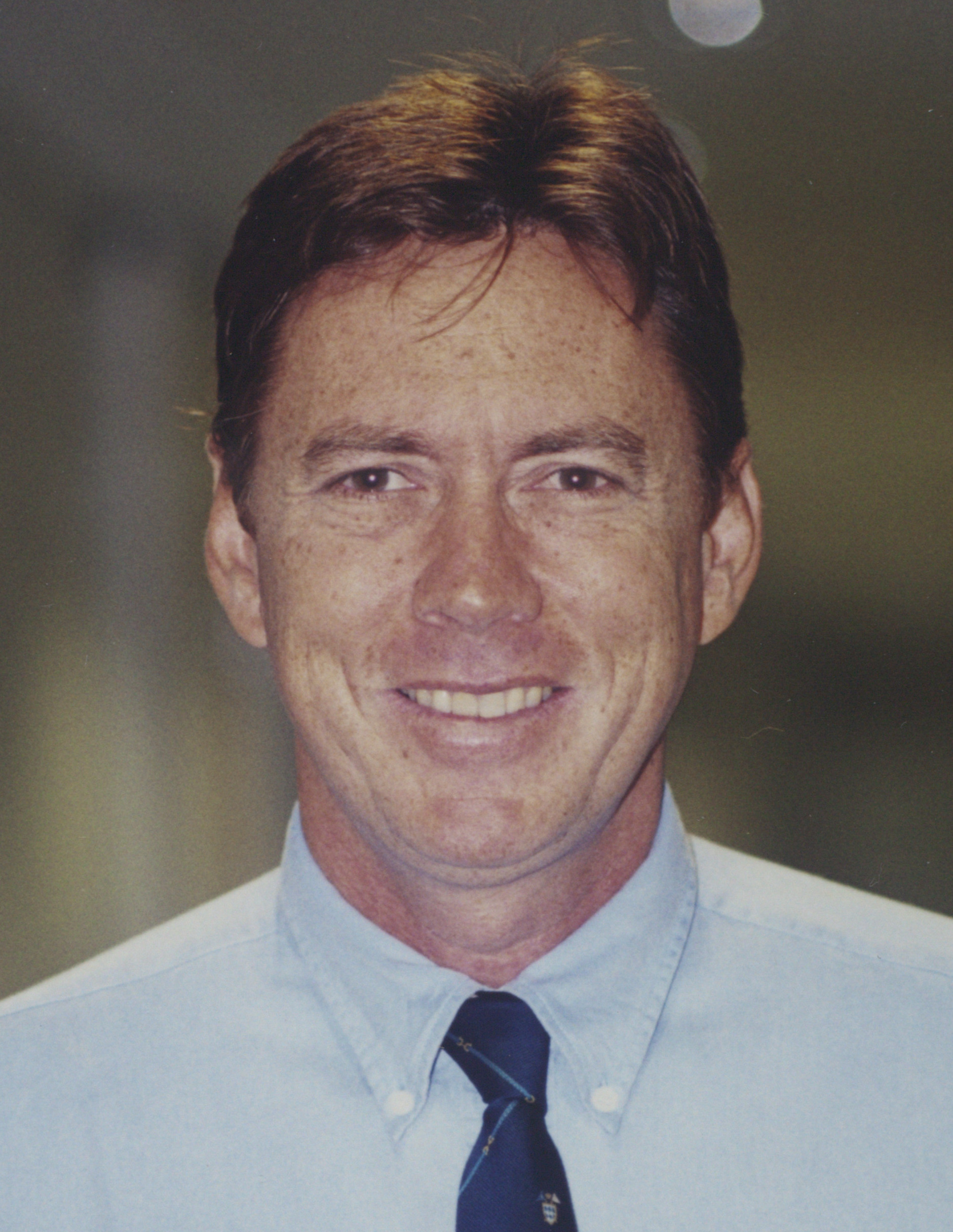
Terry Mills
Australian politician

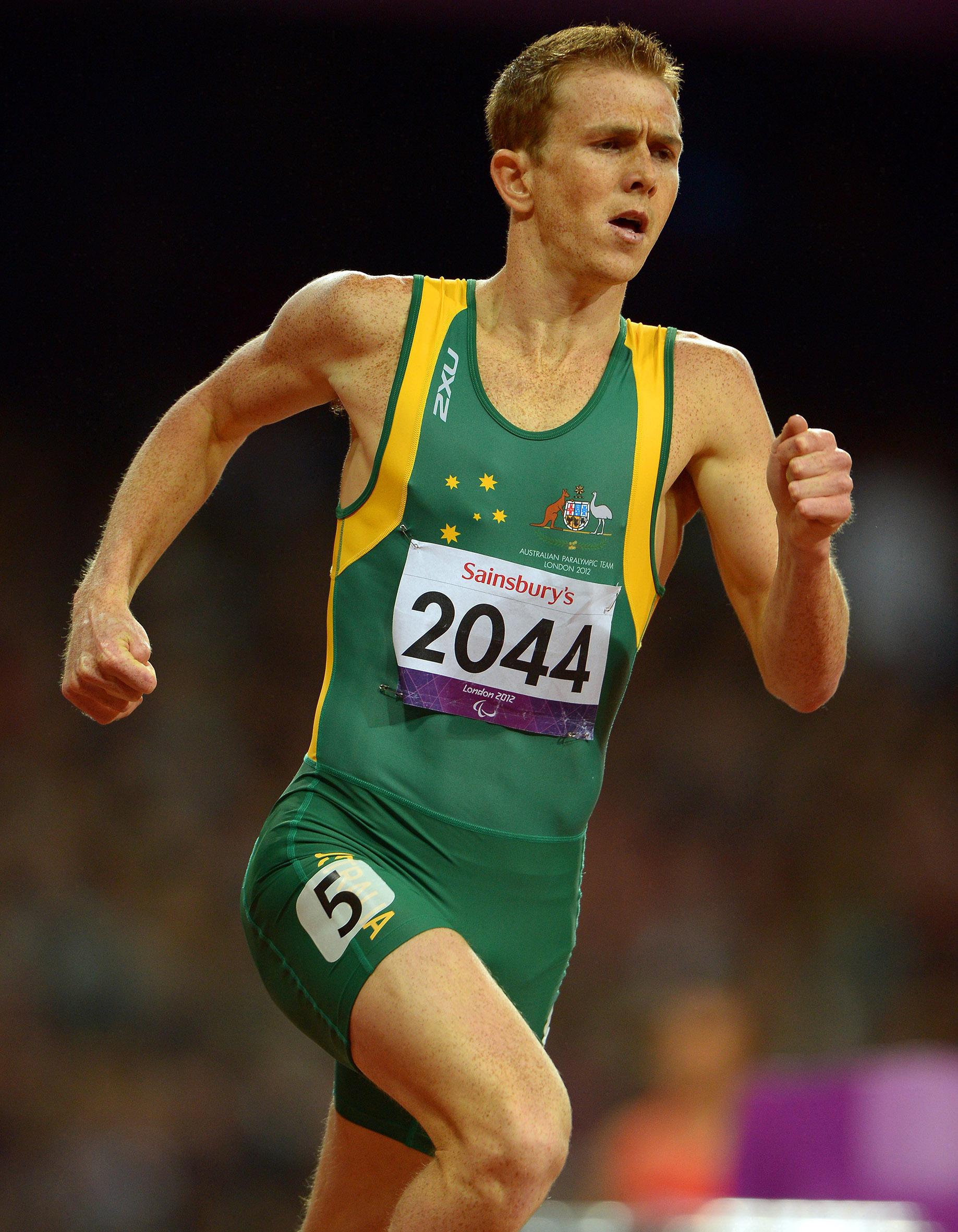
Brad Scott
Australian runner

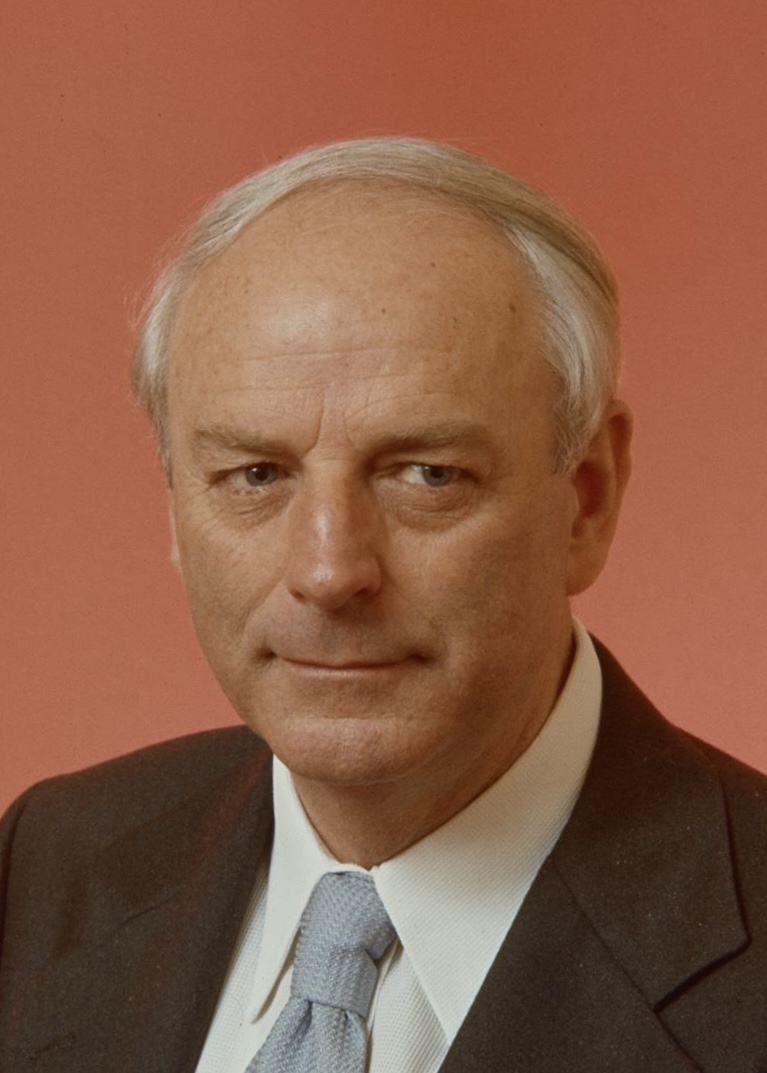
Kim Beazley Sr.
Australian politician

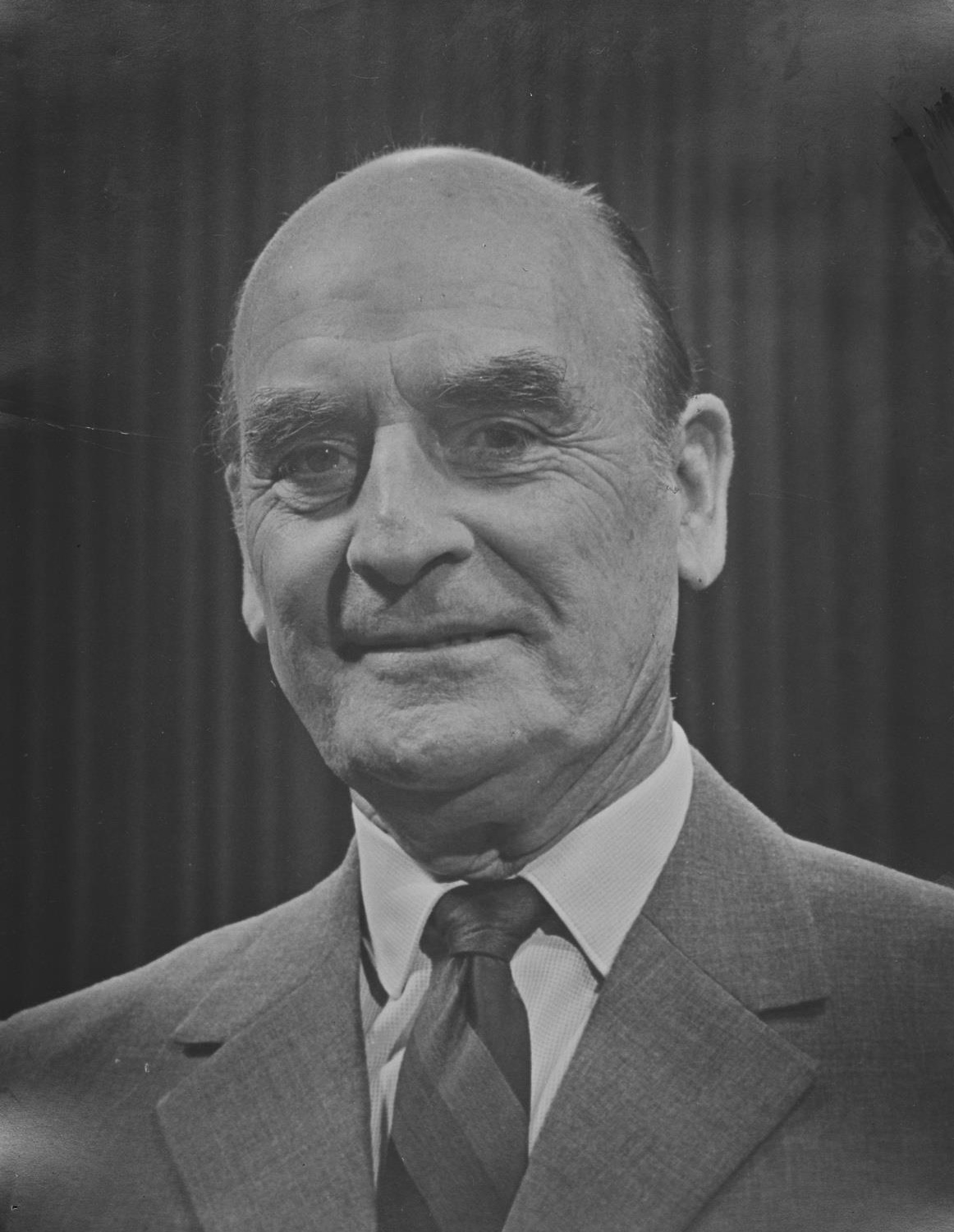
John Tonkin
Australian politician

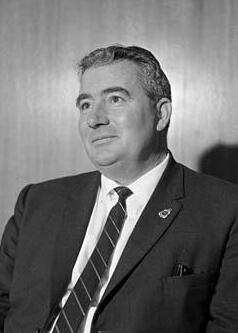
Des O'Neil
Australian politician

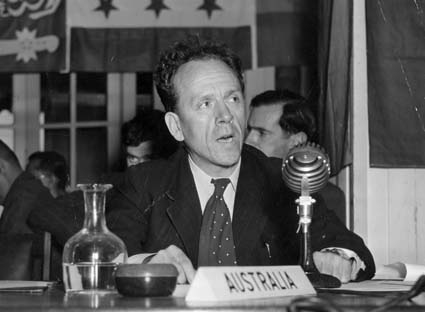
H. C. Coombs
Economist

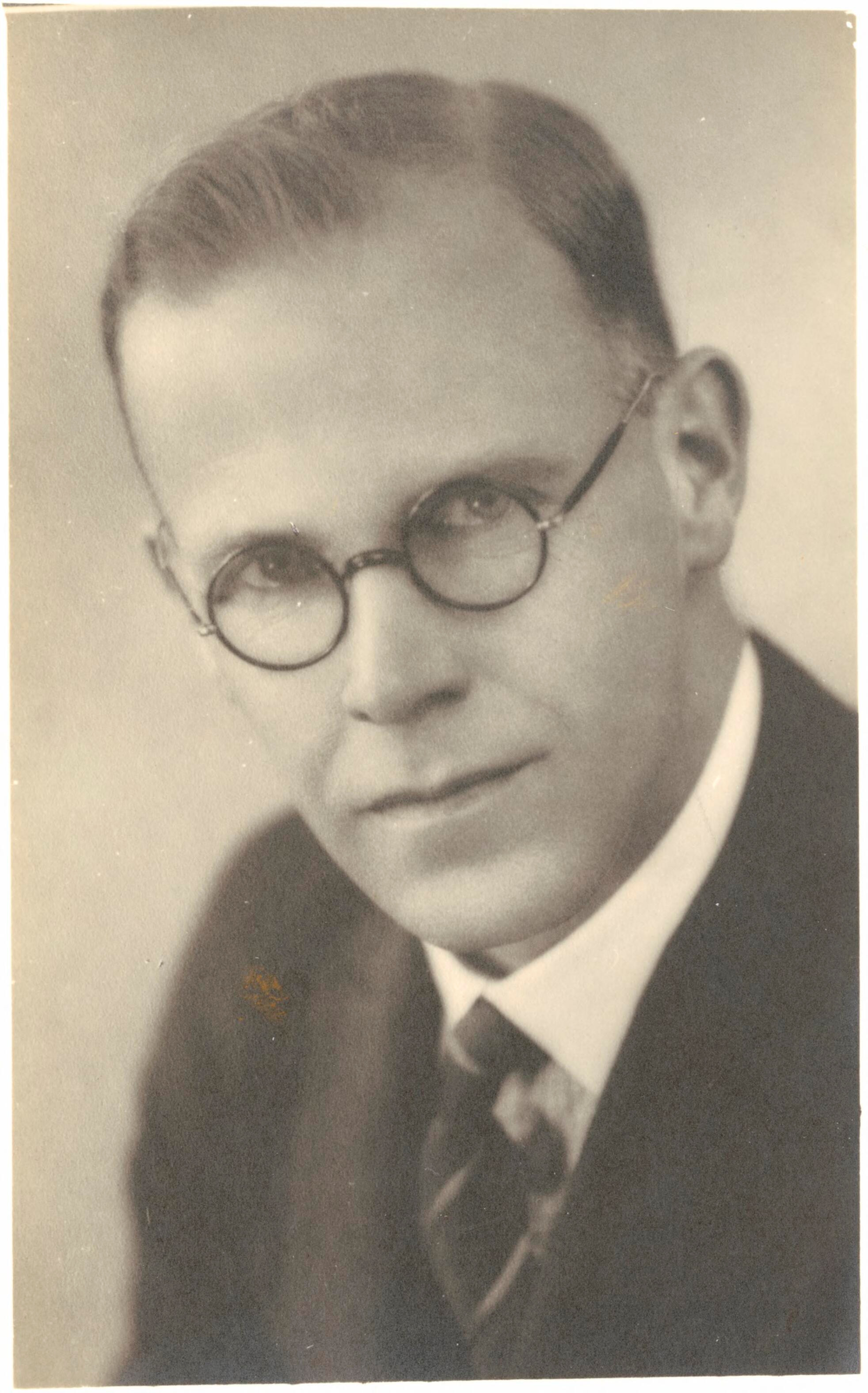
John K. Ewers
Author and poet

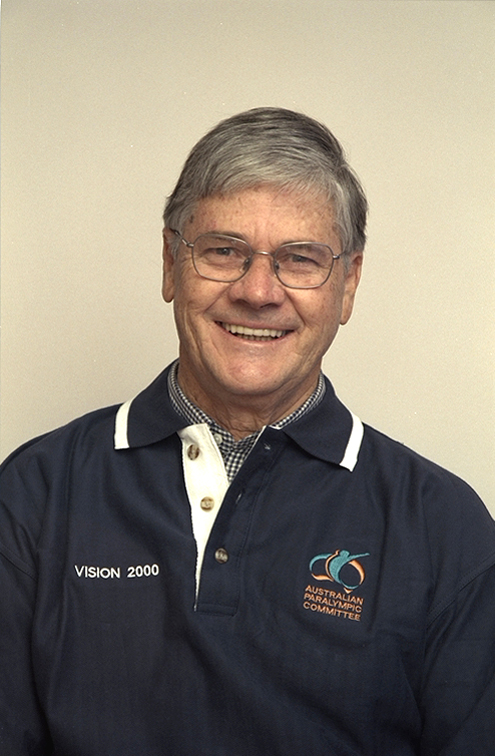
Noel Robins
Australian sailor

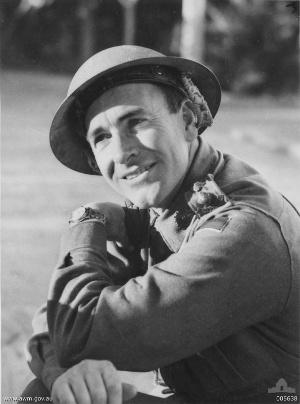
Ralph Honner
Australian soldier
Medical and Health Sciences
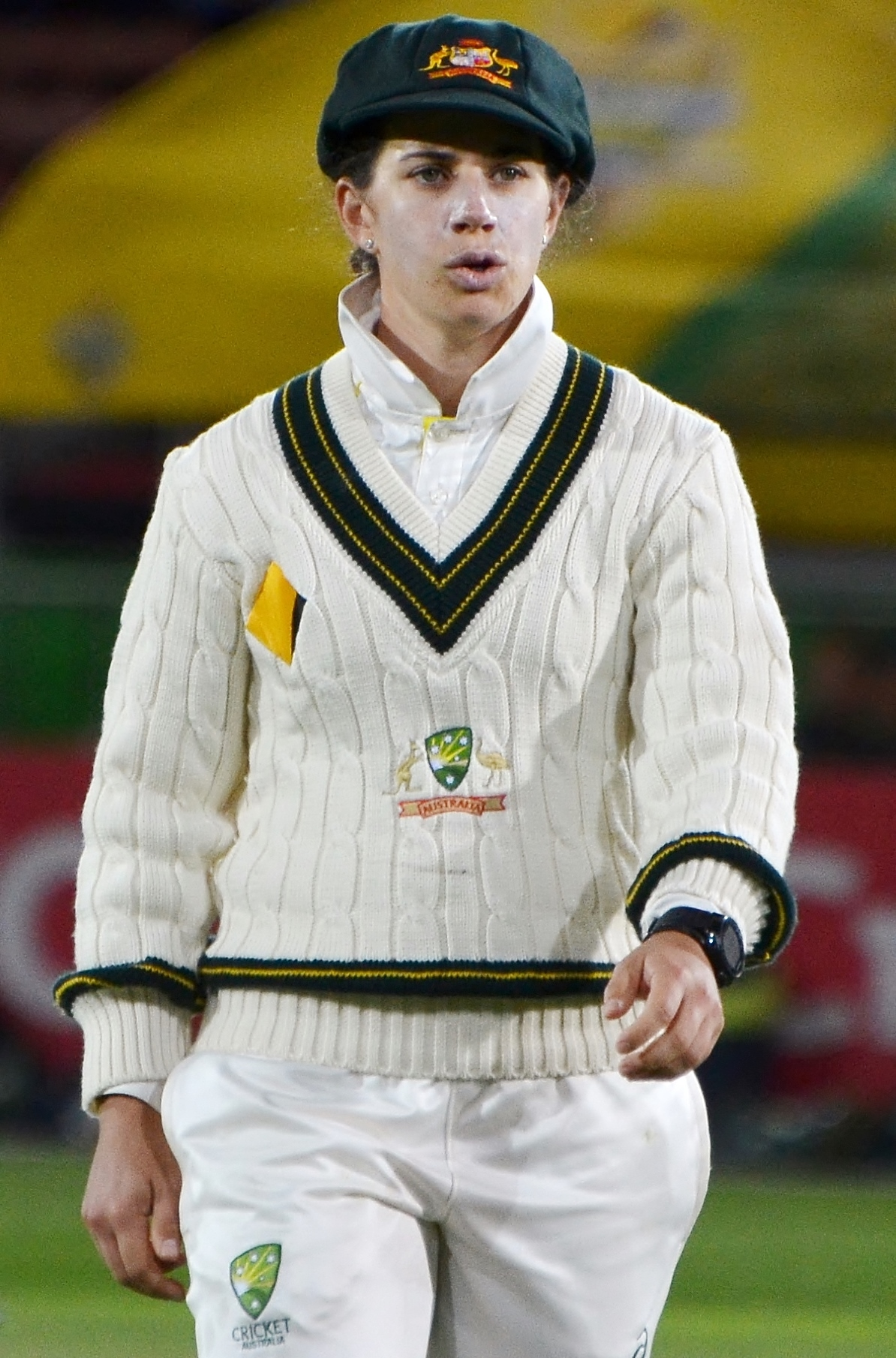
Nicole Bolton
Australian cricketer

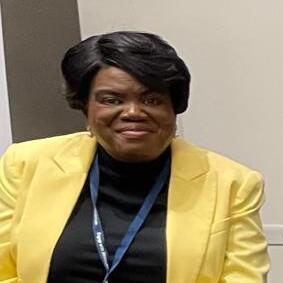
Address Mauakowa Malata
Malawian nurse, midwife and educator
Performing Arts
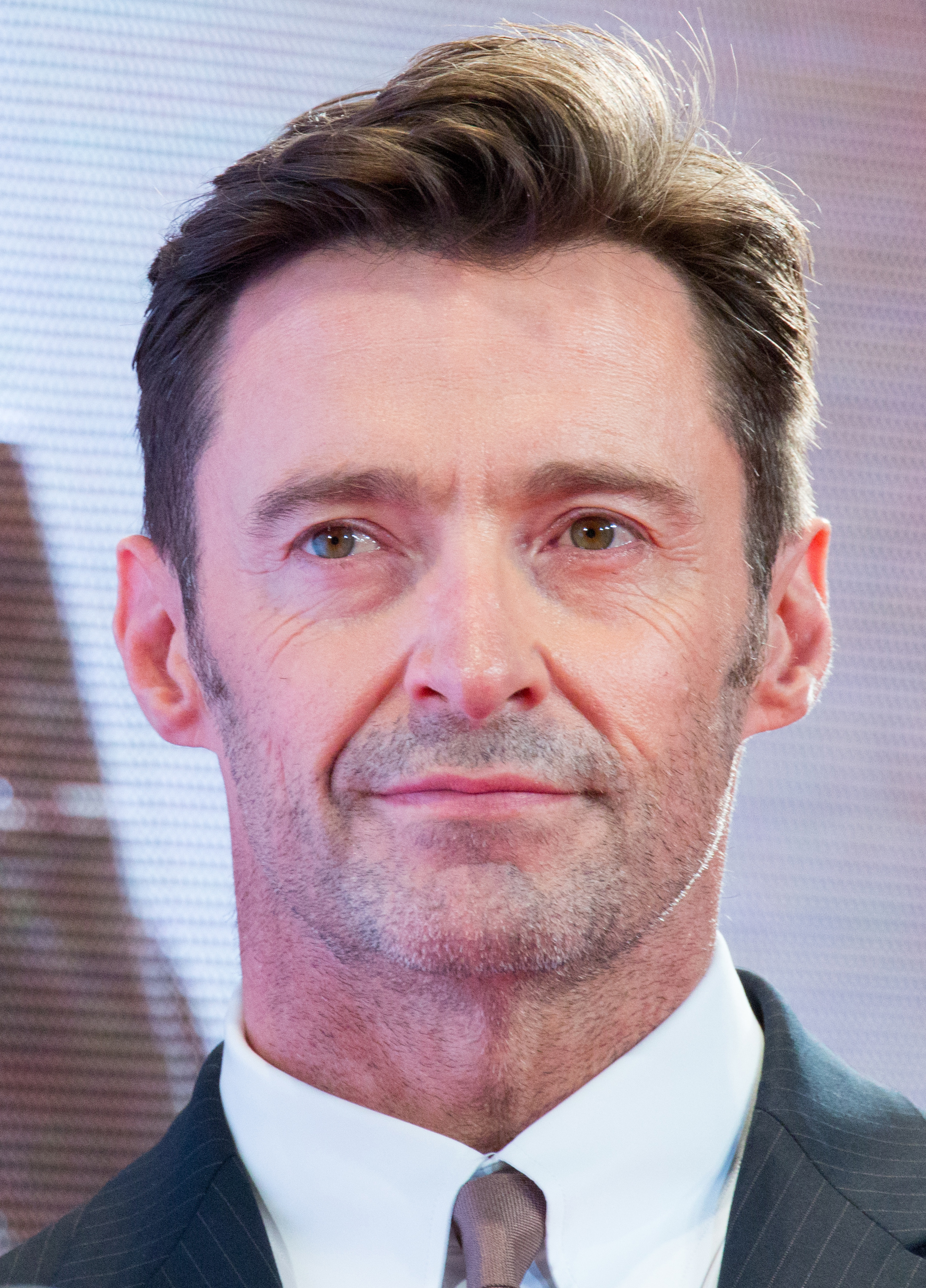
Hugh Jackman
Australian actor

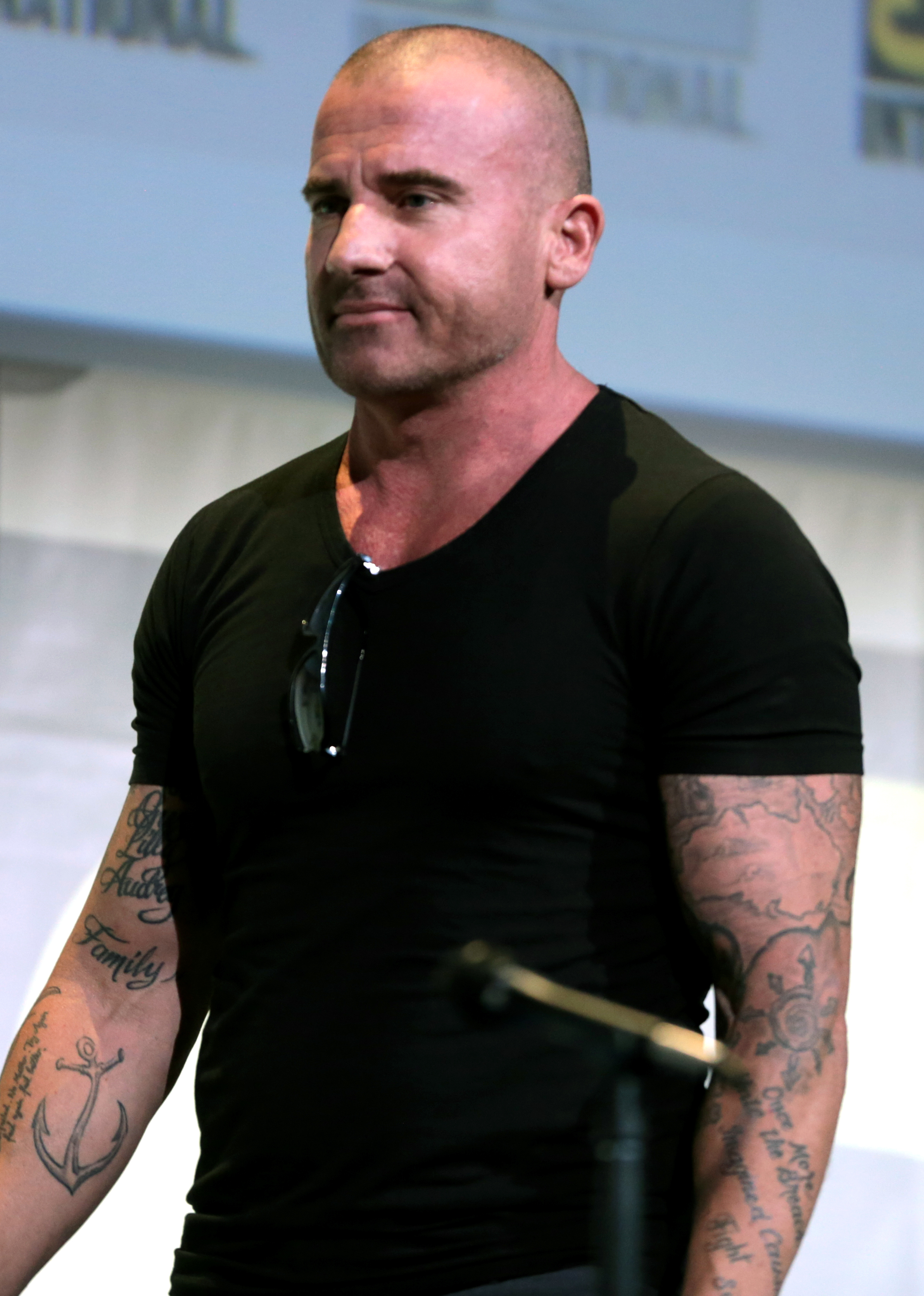
Dominic Purcell
Australian actor

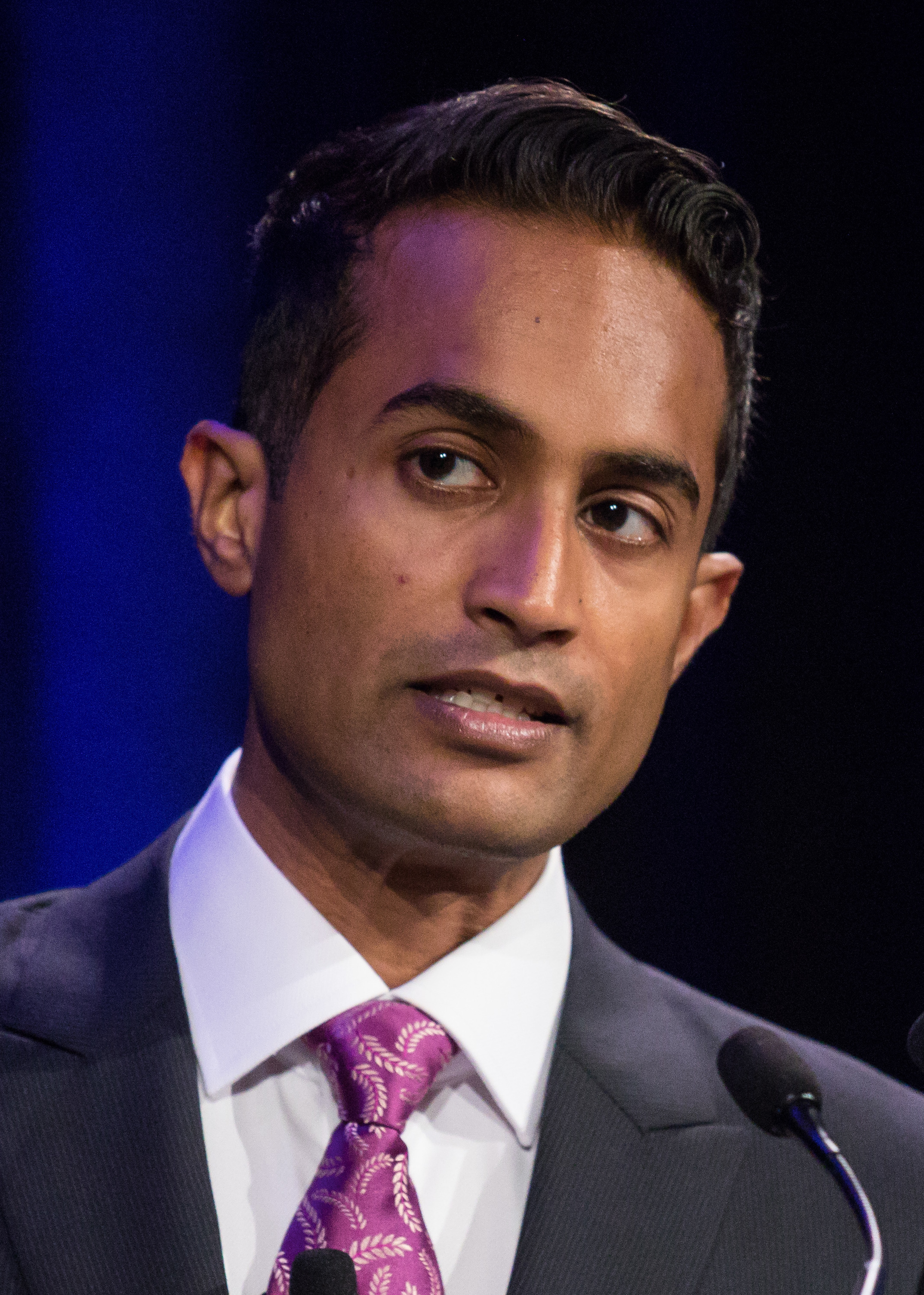
Jeremy Fernandez
Australian journalist

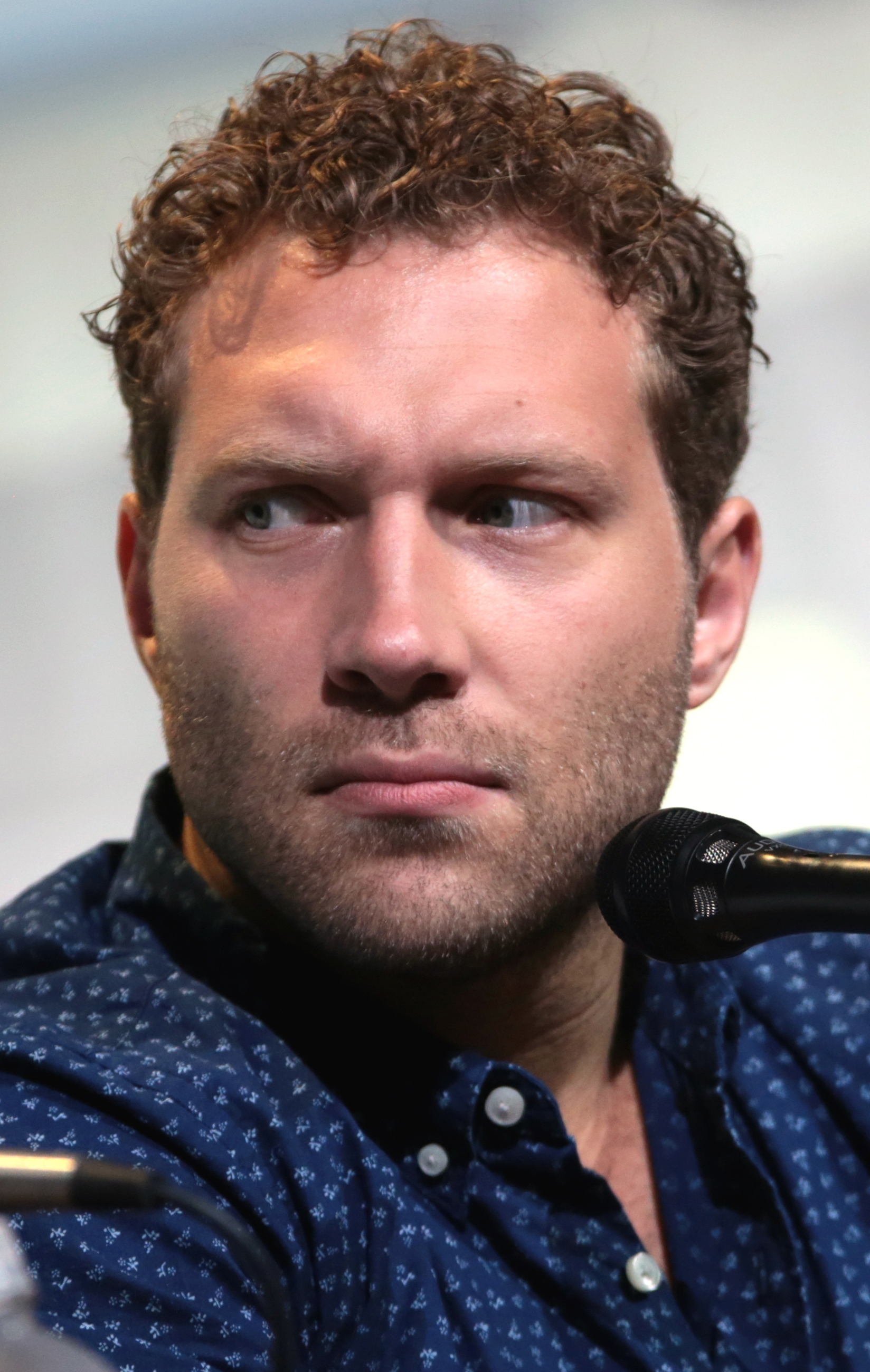
Jai Courtney
Australian actor

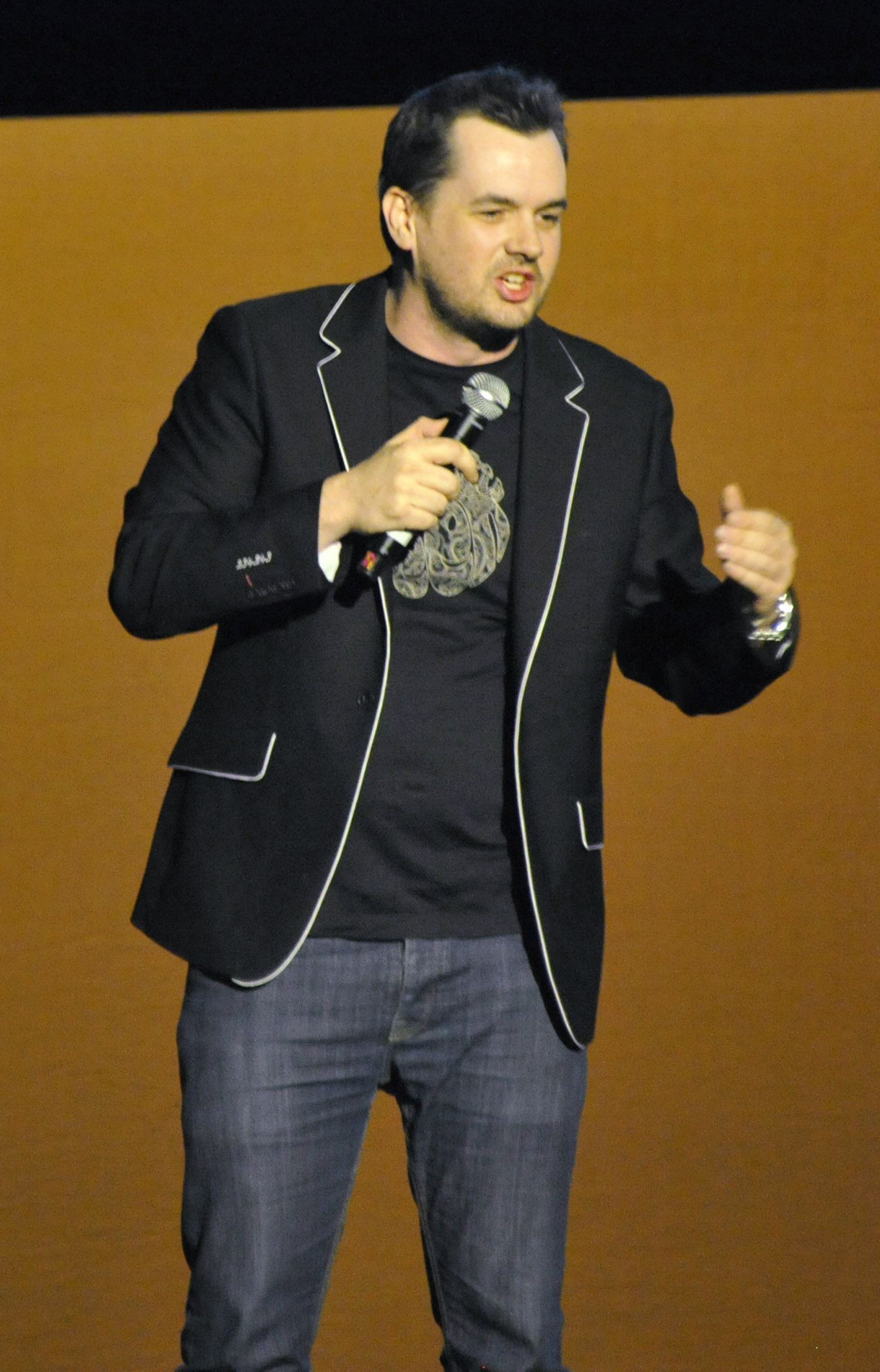
Jim Jefferies
Comedian

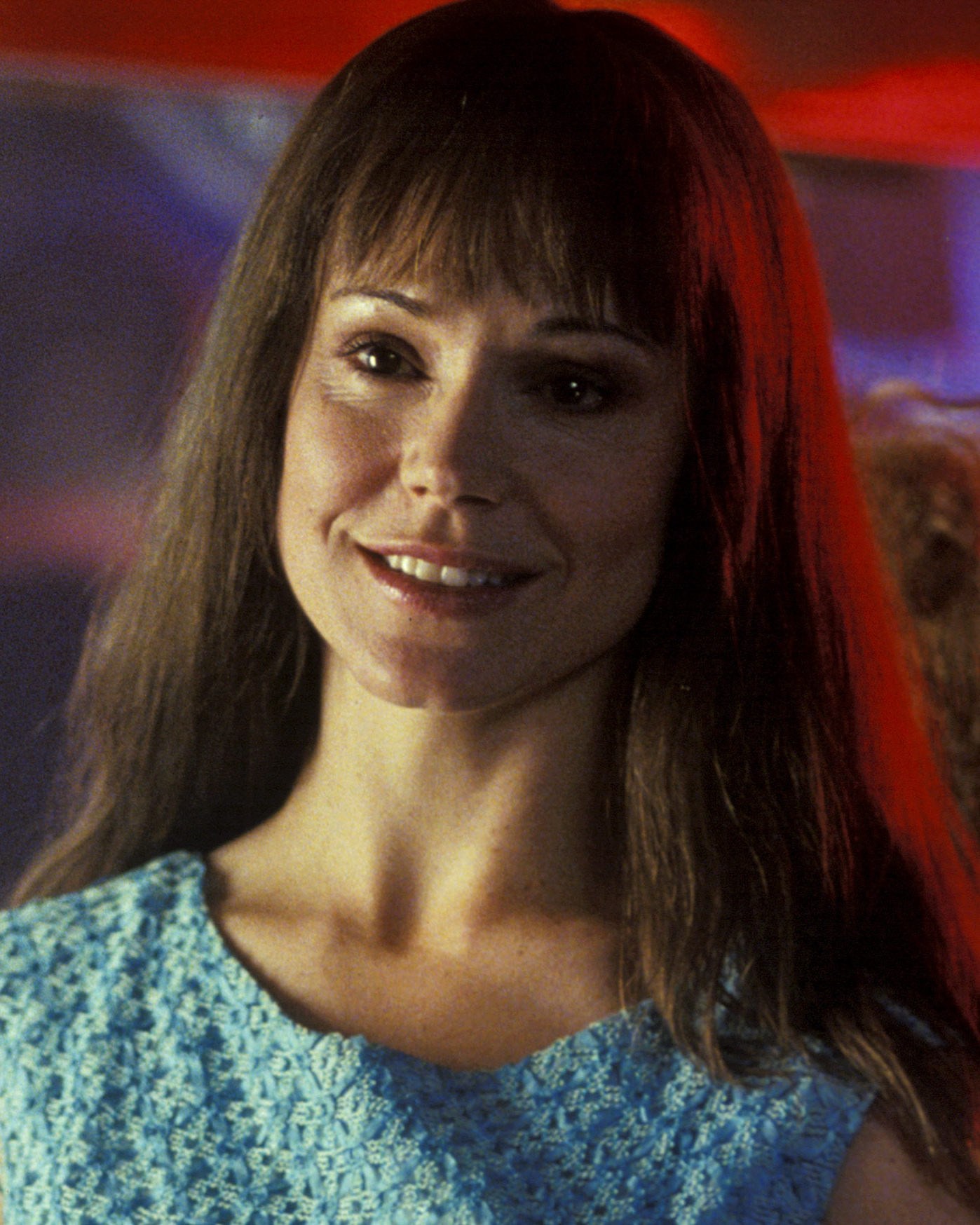
Frances O'Connor
Actor and director

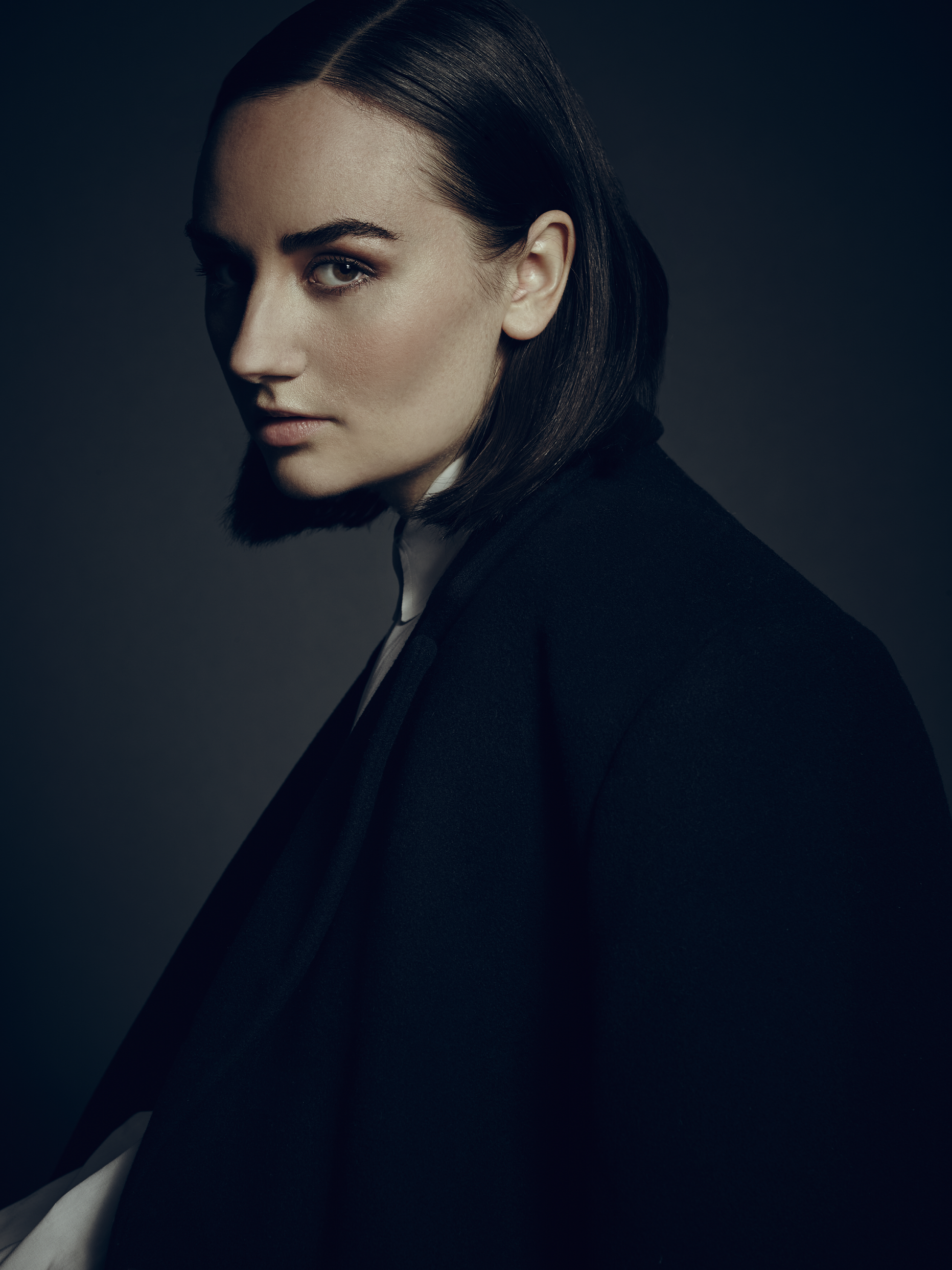
Meg Mac
Singer-songwriter

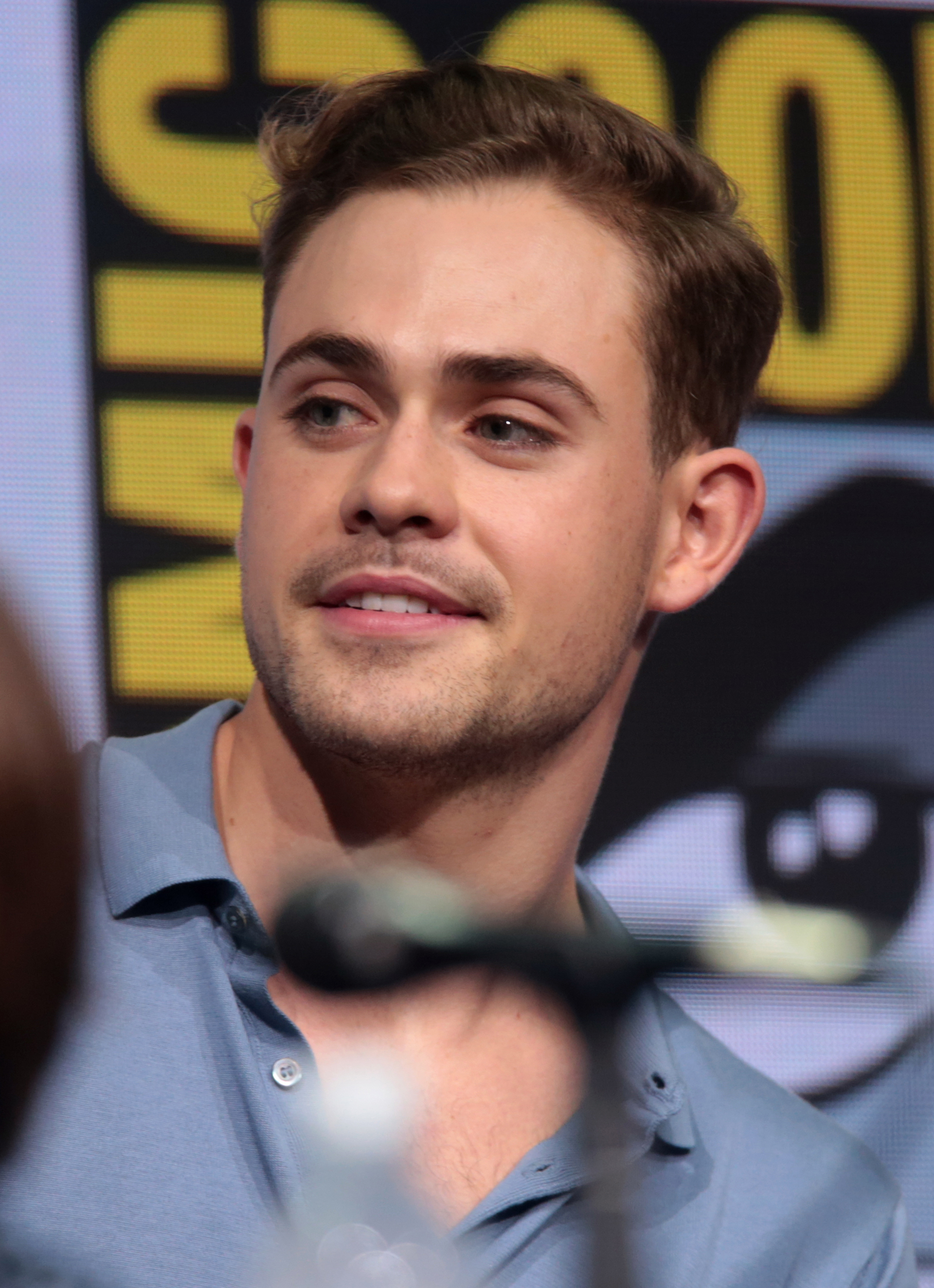
Dacre Montgomery
Australian actor

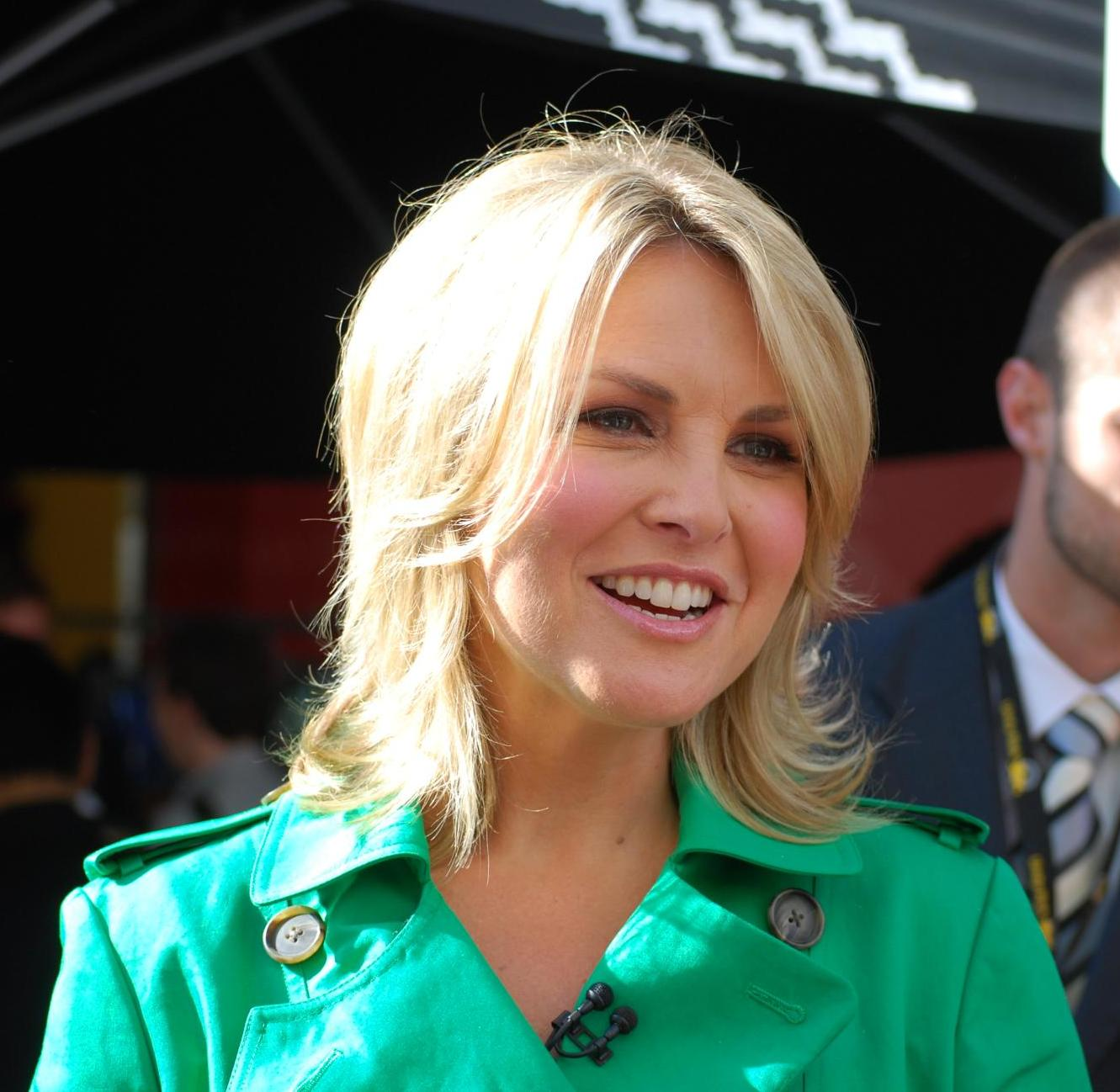
Georgie Gardner
Journalist

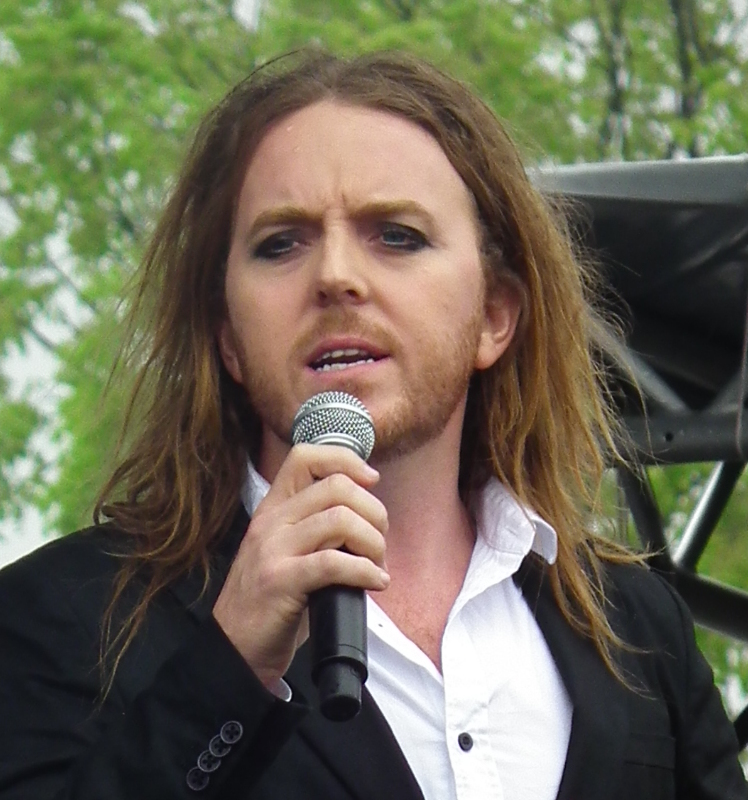
Tim Minchin
Entertainer

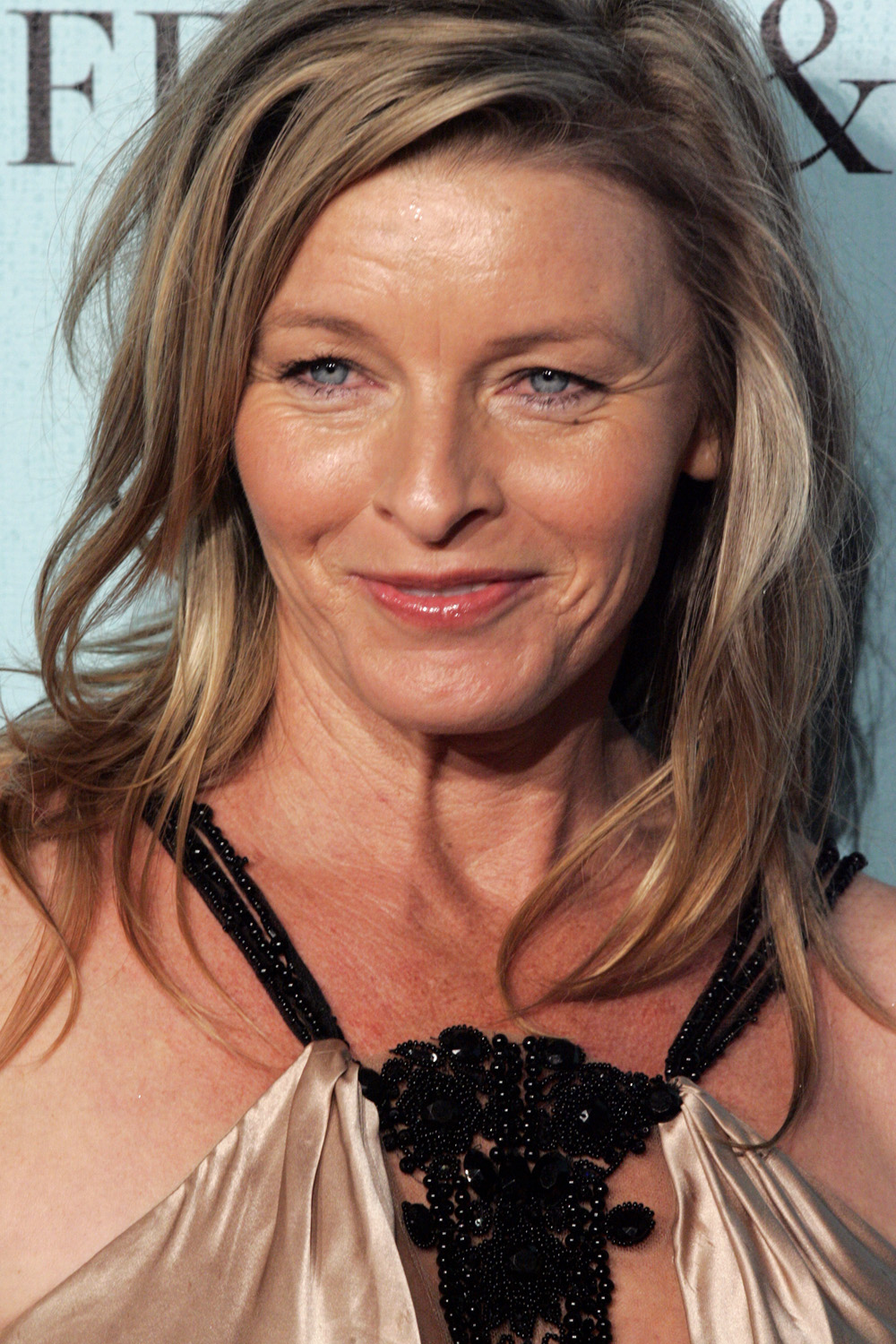
Tammy Macintosh
Australian actor

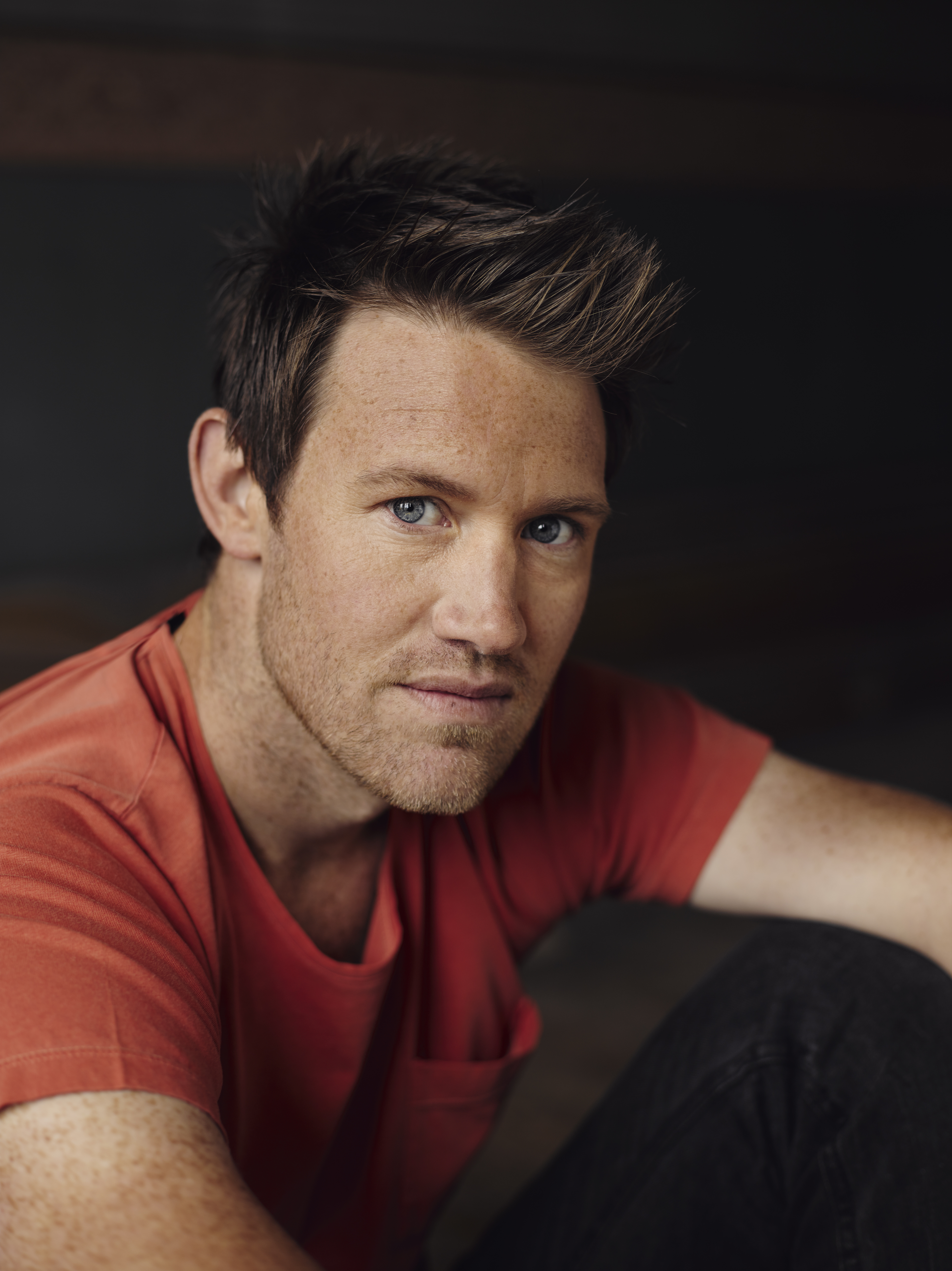
Eddie Perfect
Singer-songwriter

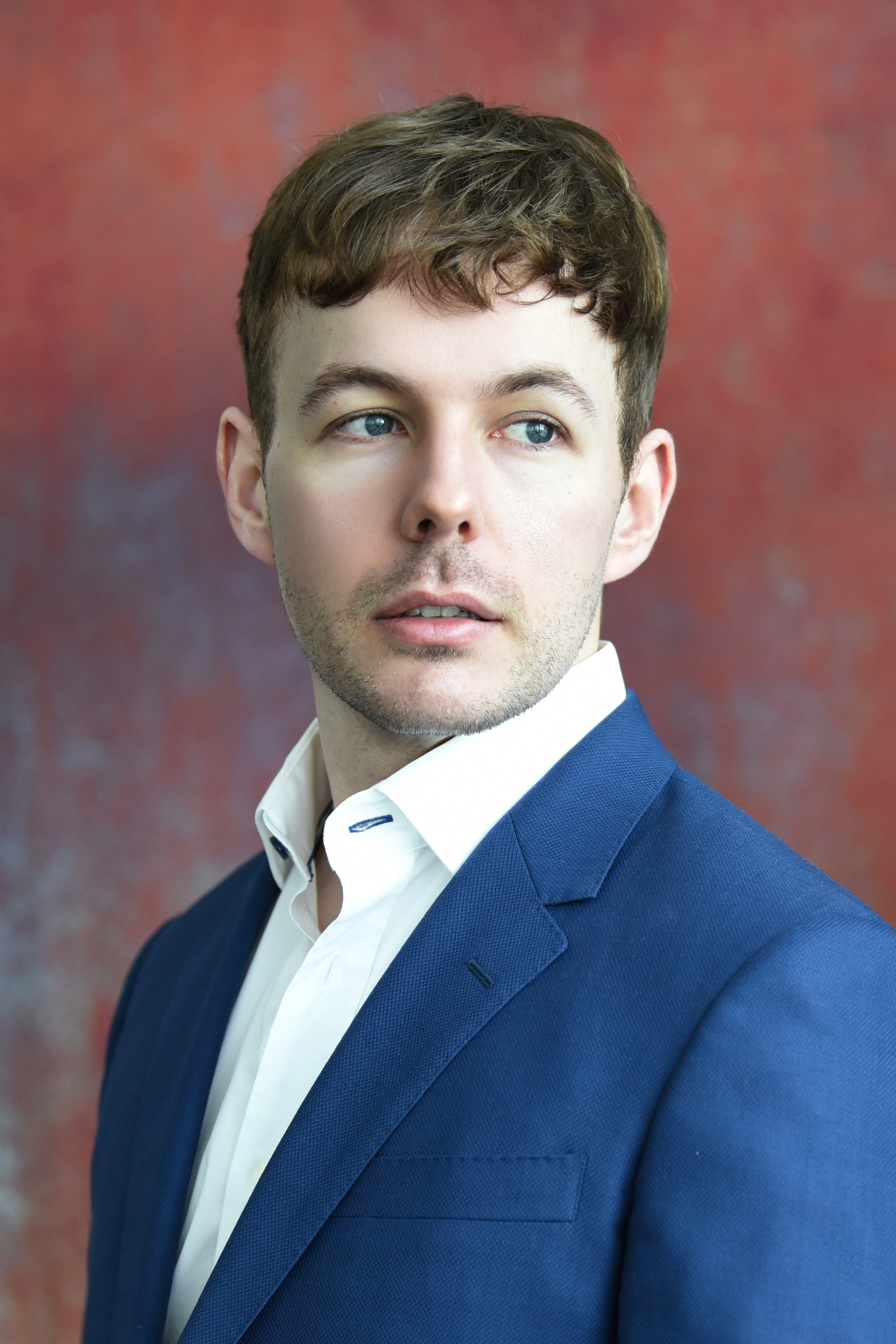
Alasdair Kent
Operatic tenor

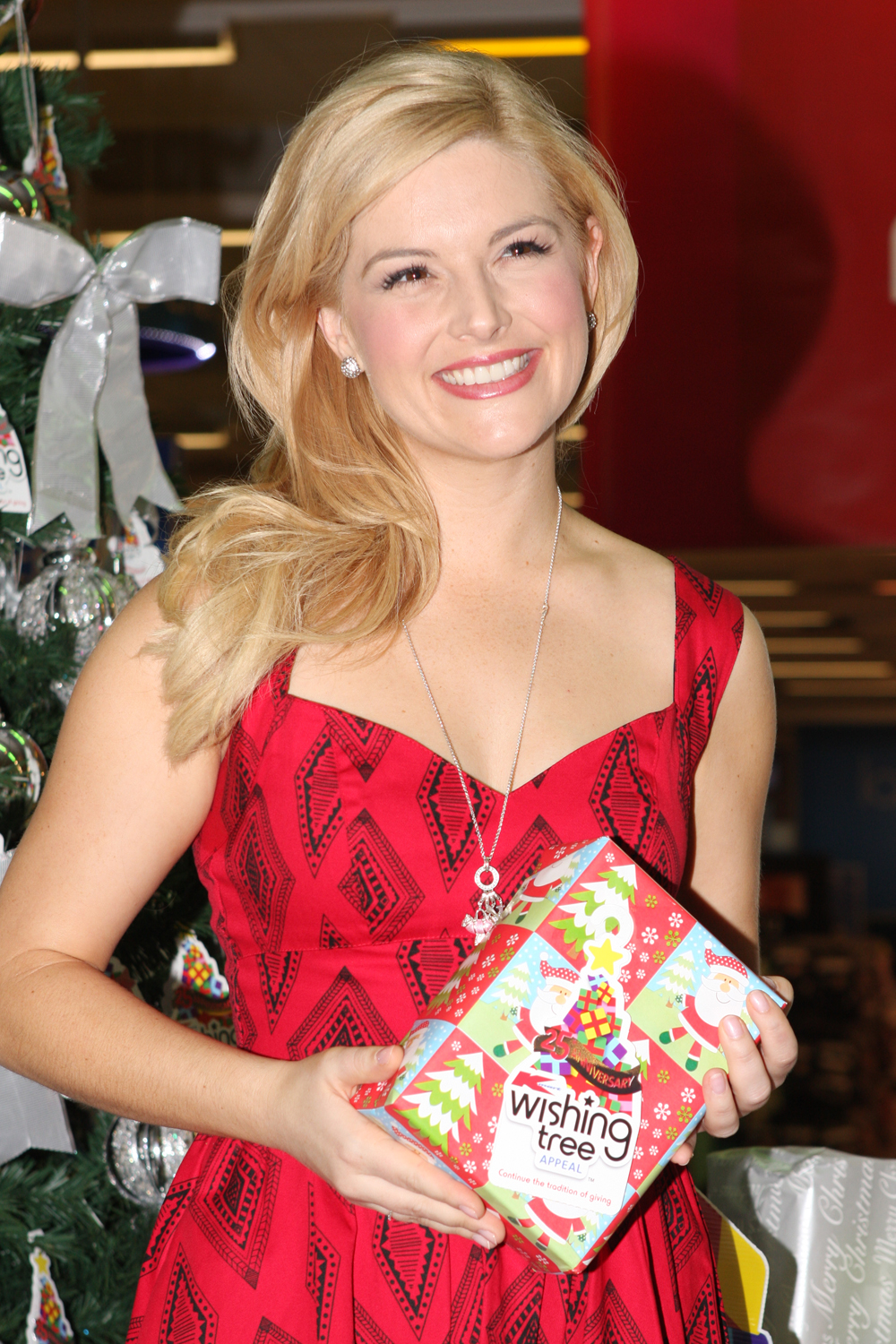
Lucy Durack
Actor and singer

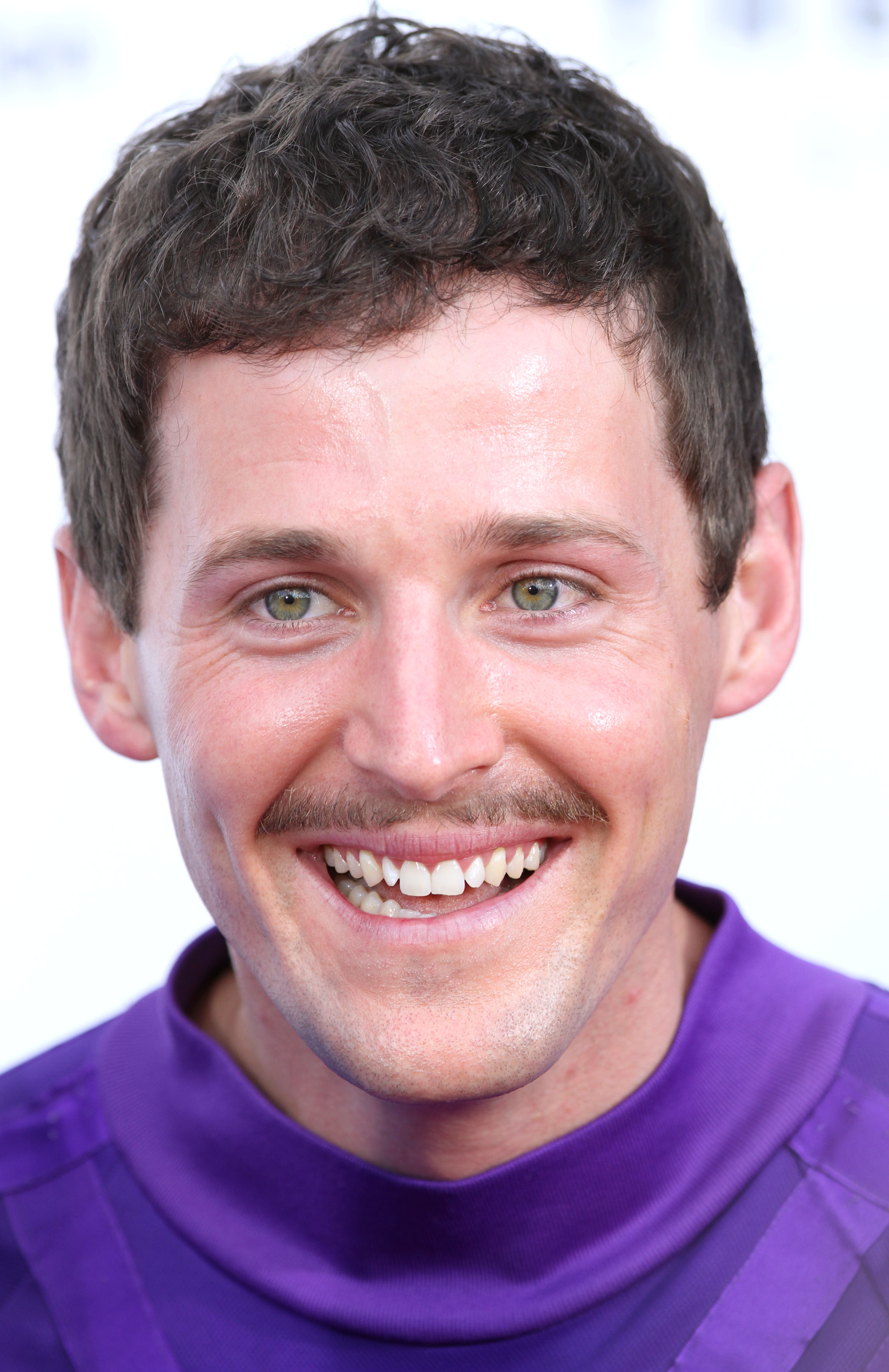
Lachlan Gillespie
Entertainer

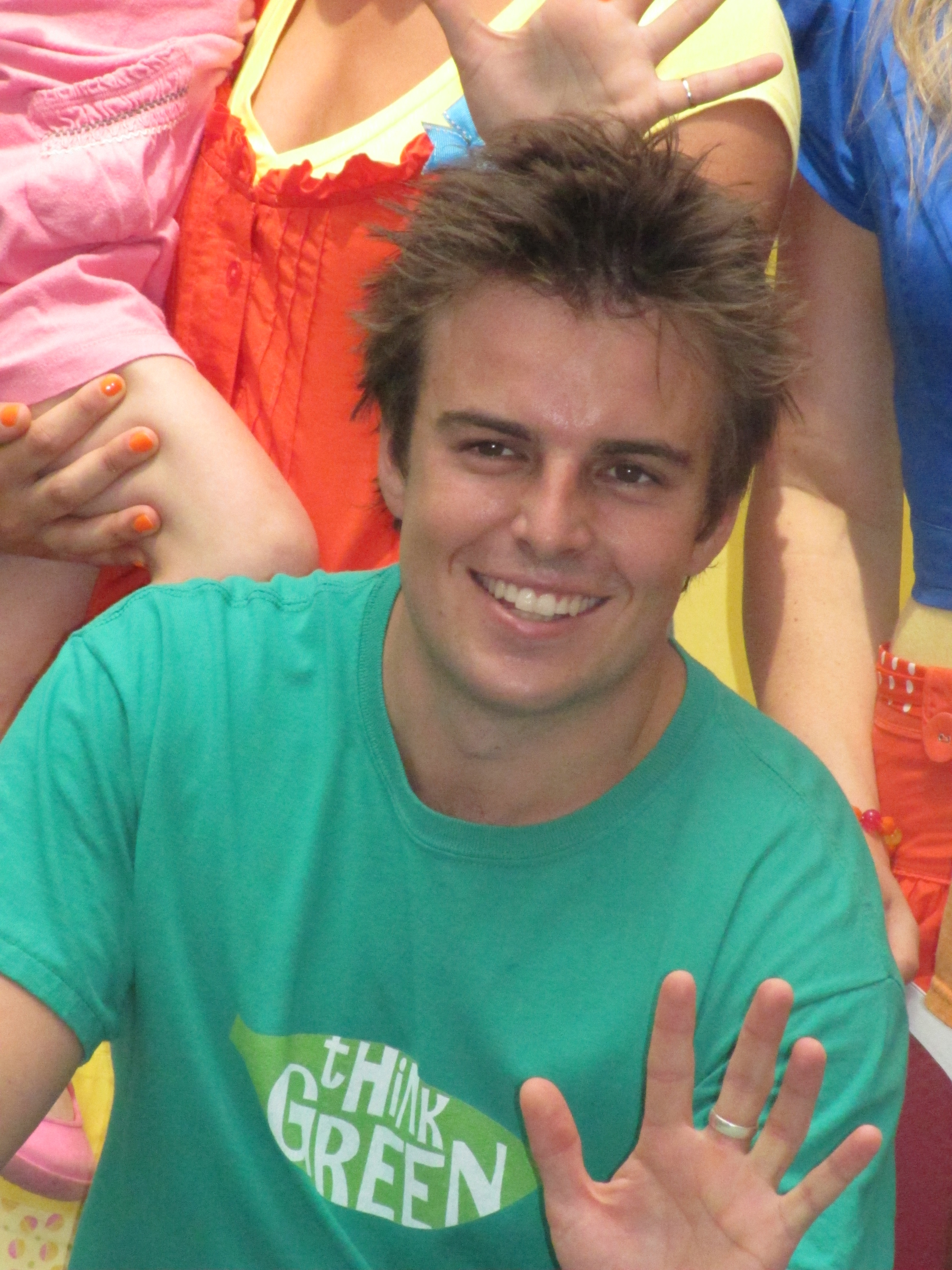
Tim Maddren
Entertainer

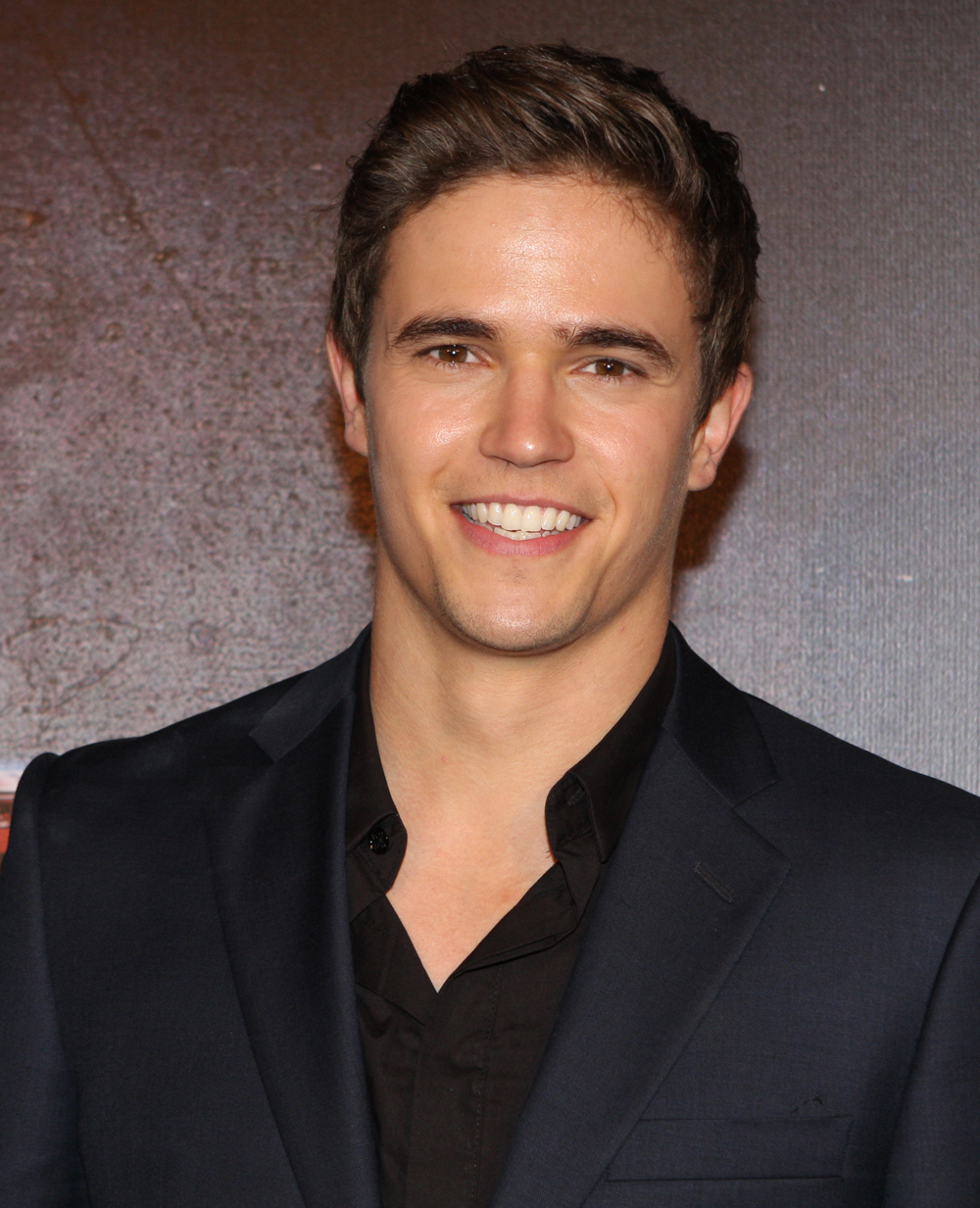
Nic Westaway
Actor and singer

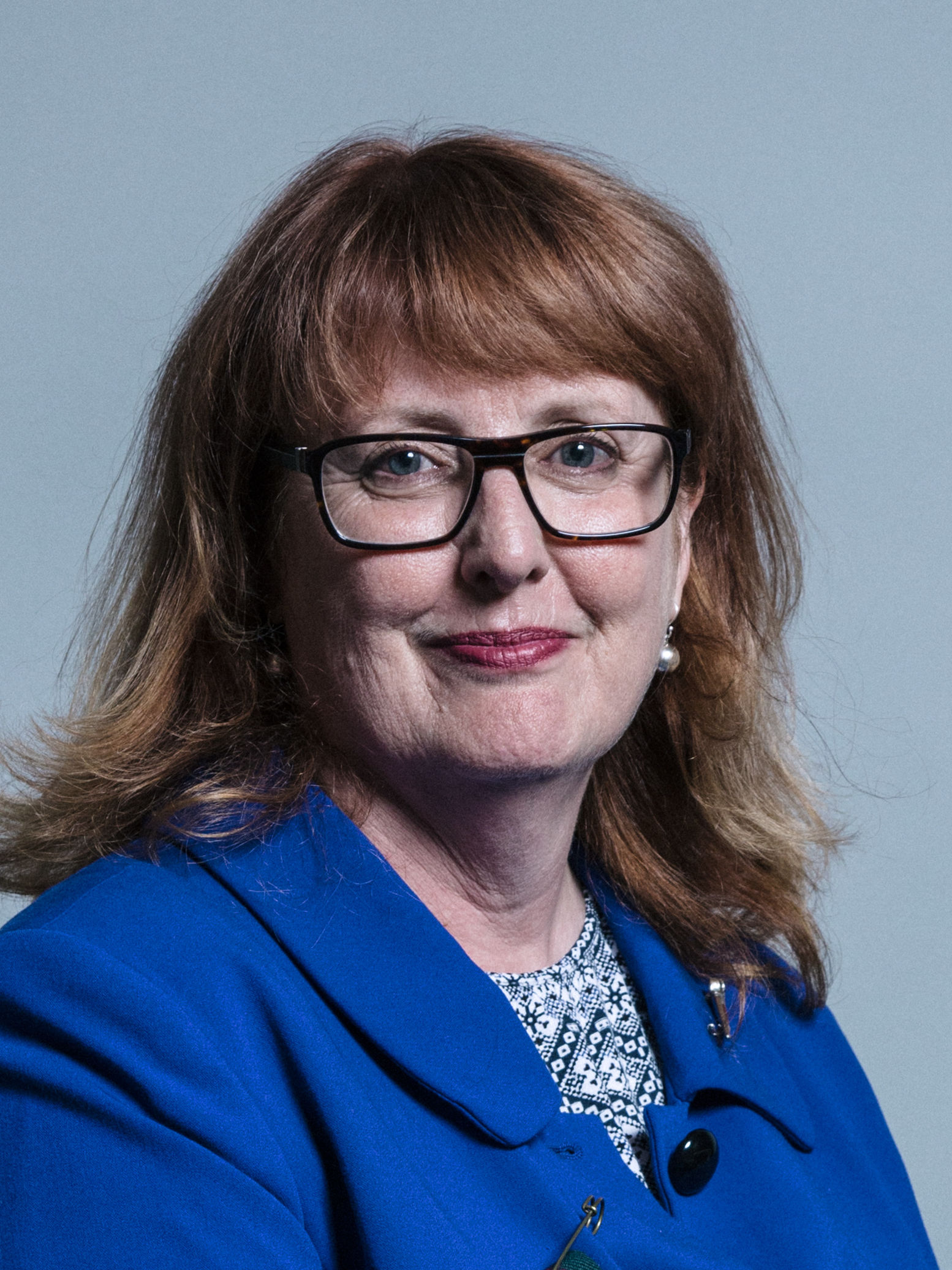
Diedre Brock
Scottish politician

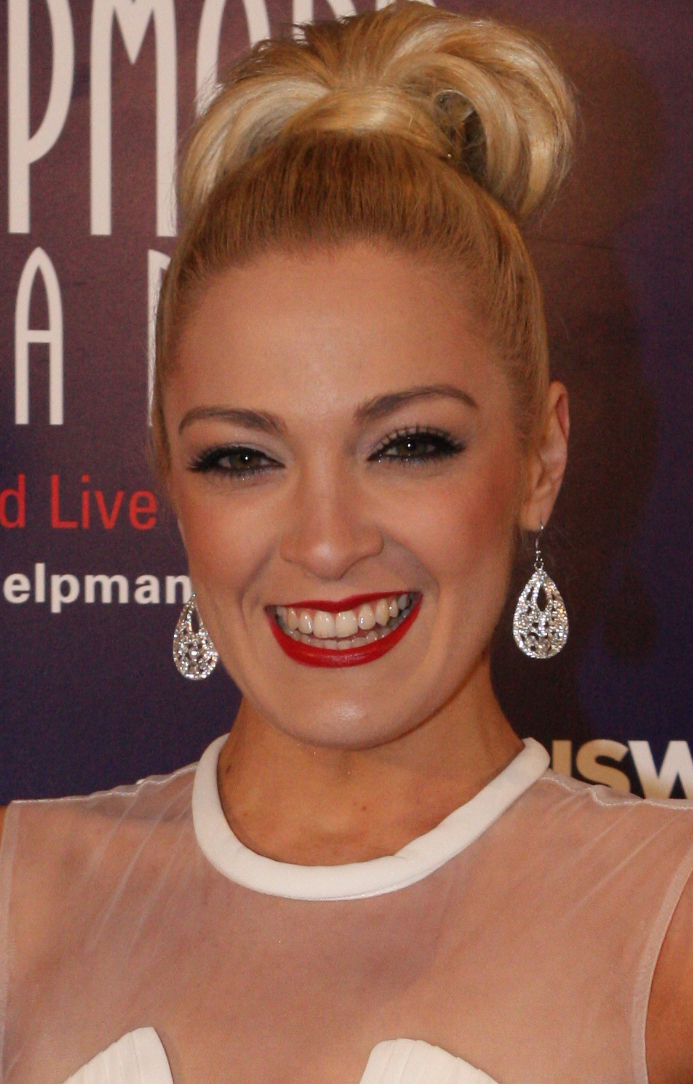
Gretel Scarlett
Australian actor

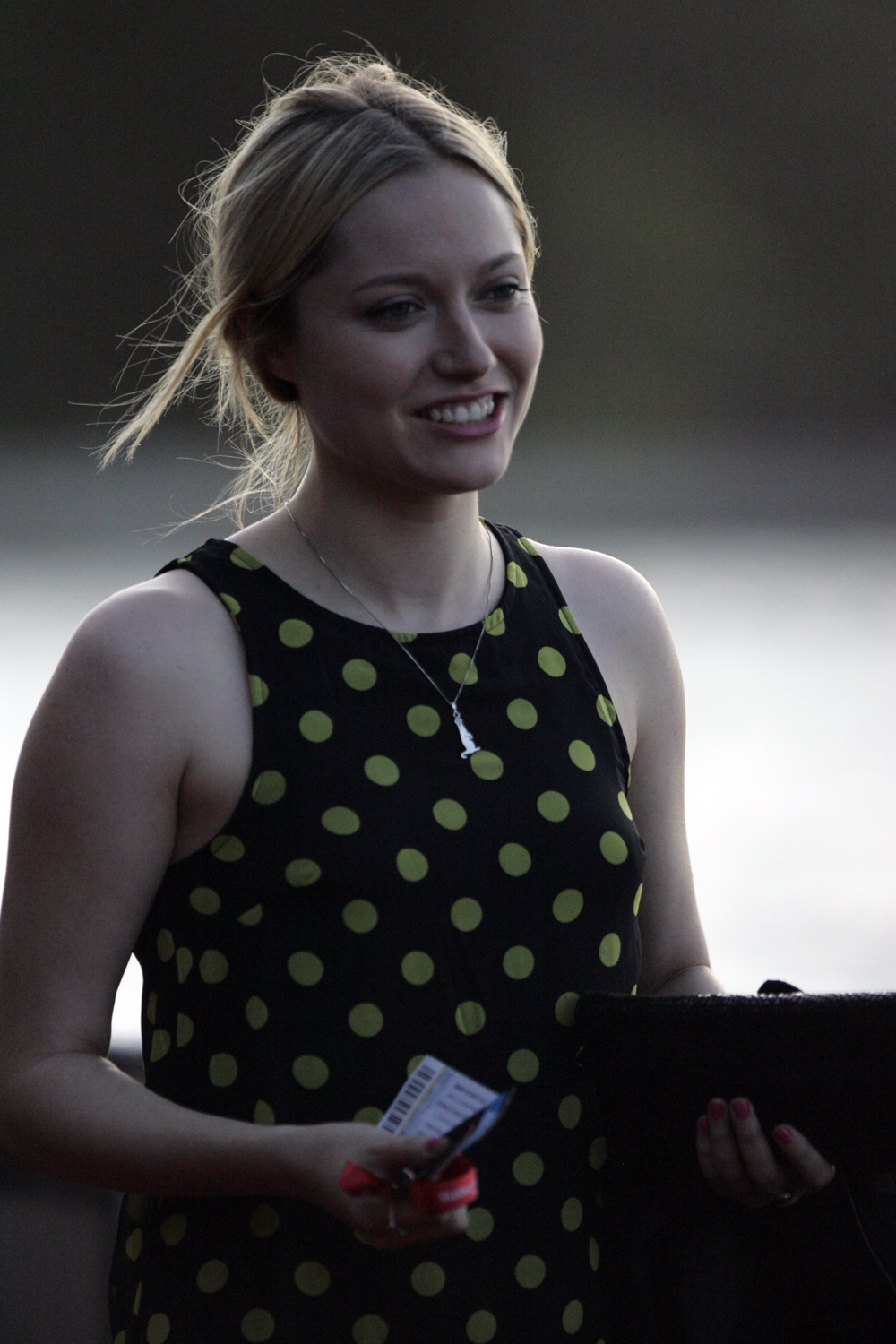
Georgina Haig
Australian actor

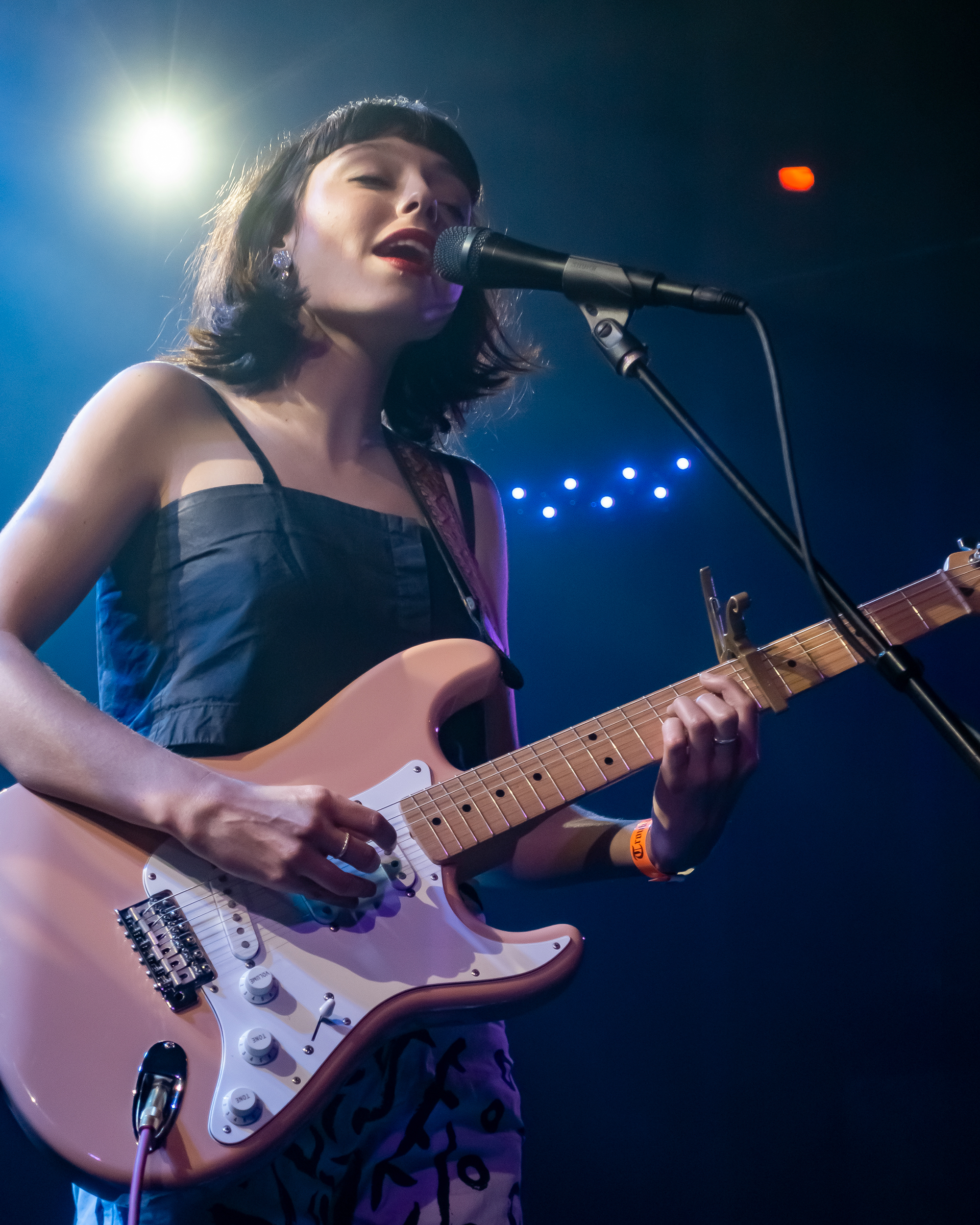
Stella Donnelly
Singer-songwriter

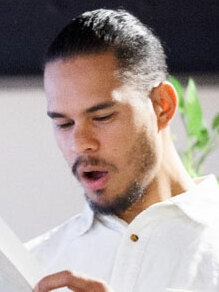
Mark Coles Smith
Actor and musician

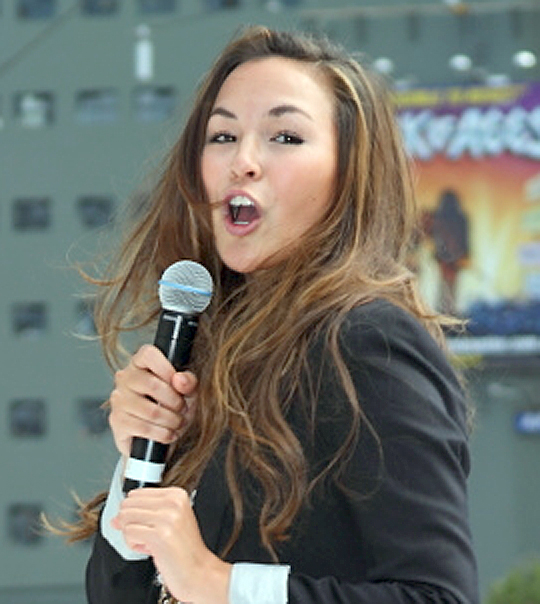
Gemma Pranita
Australian actor

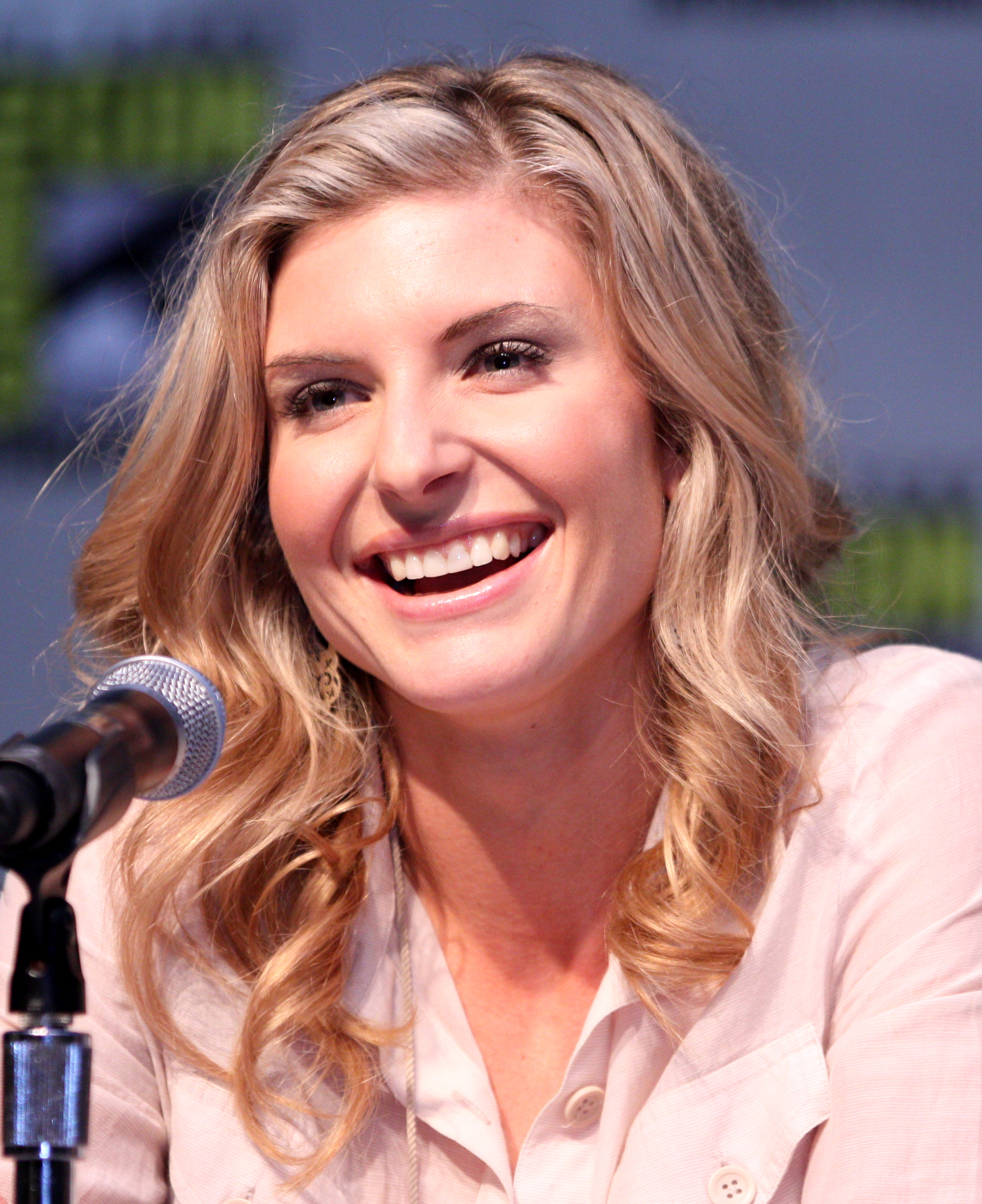
Viva Bianca
Australian actor
Science
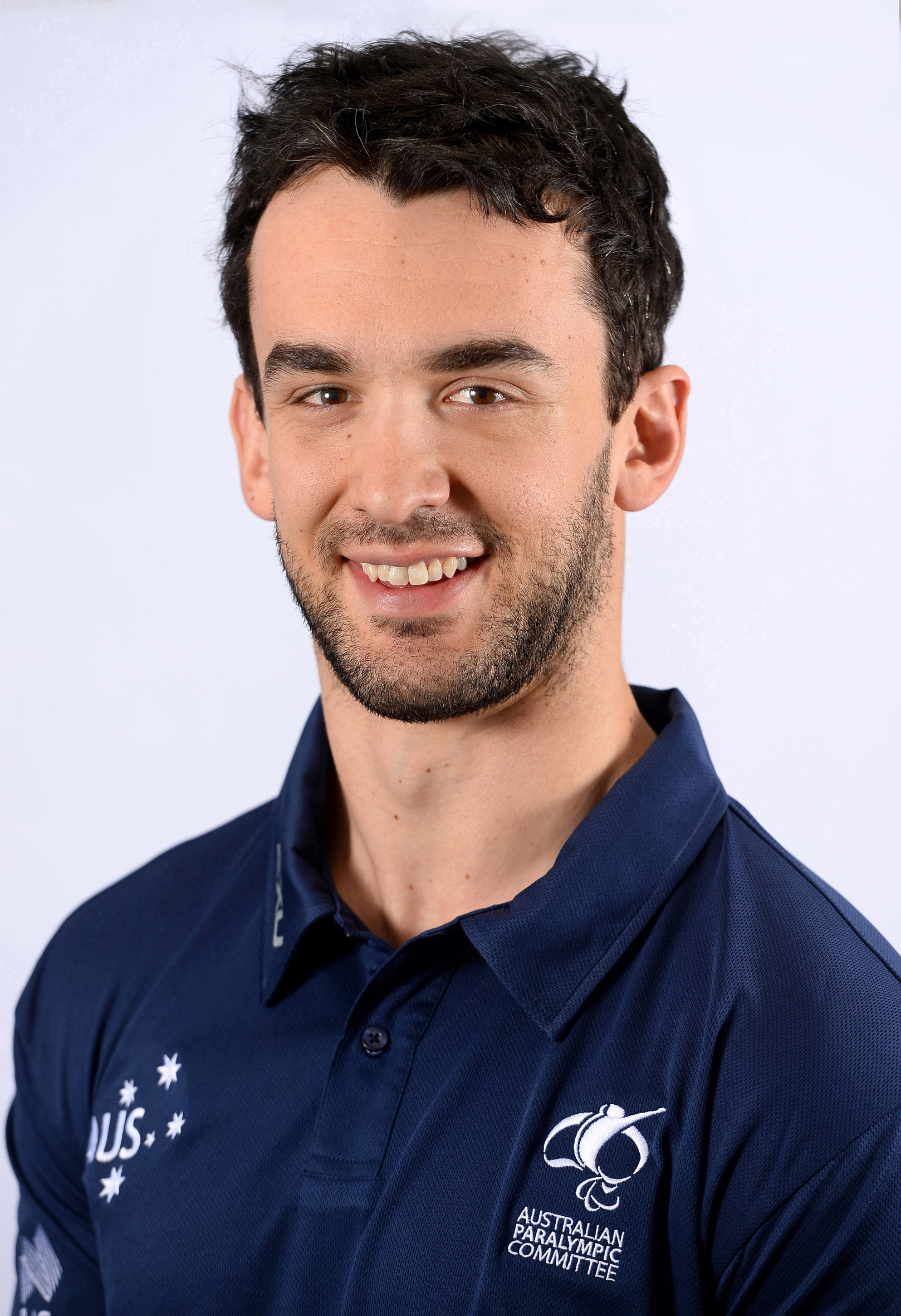
Adam Deans
Paralympian

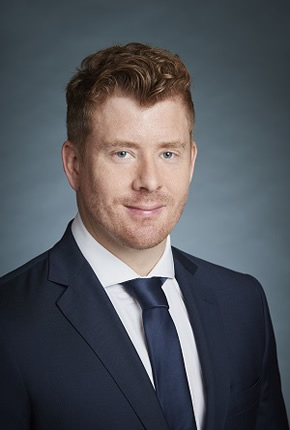
Wilson Tucker
Australian politician

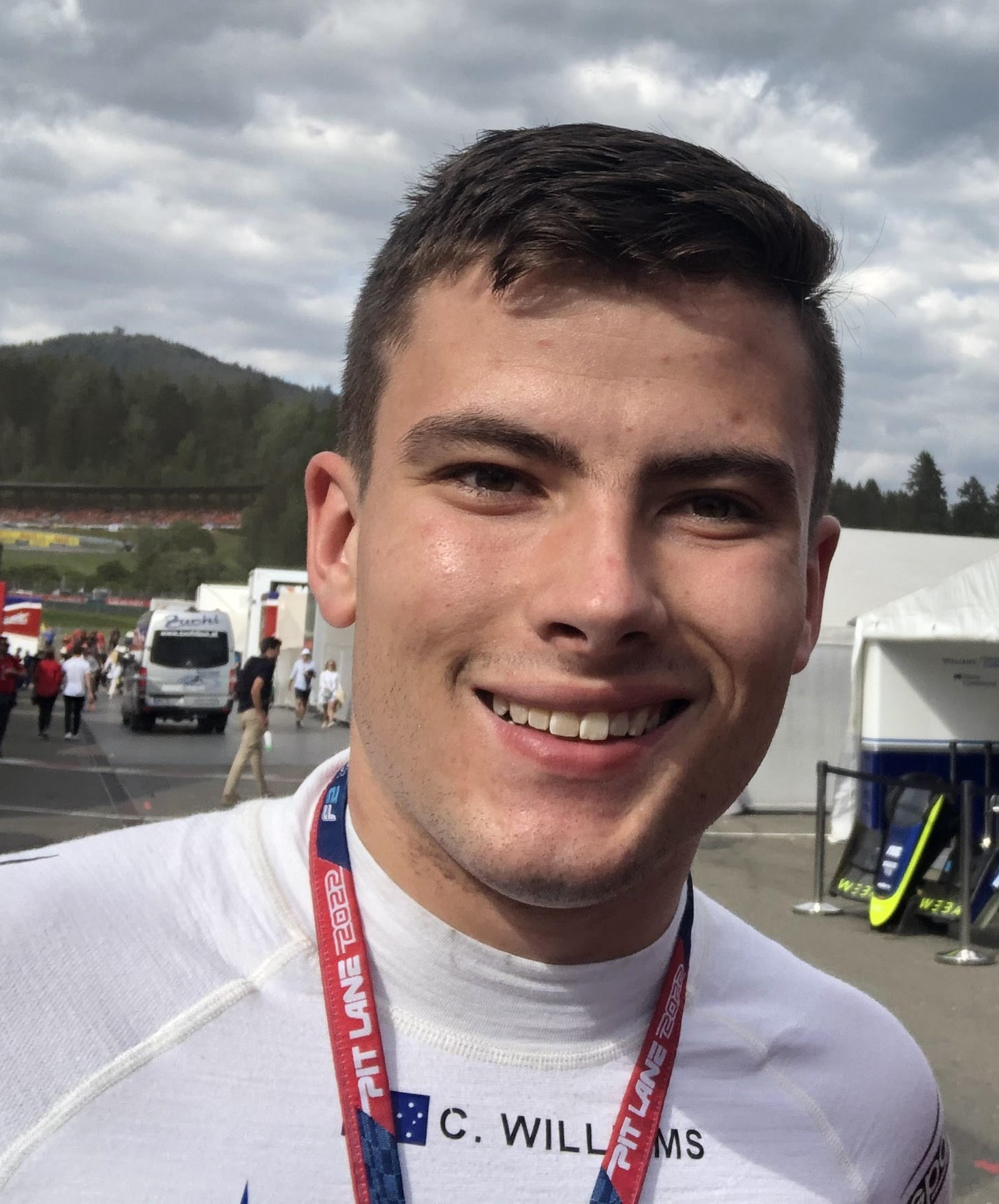
Calan Williams
Racing driver

=== Staff and faculty ===
As of 2024, Edith Cowan University has staff and faculty, both past and present, notable in their field in two of its eight teaching schools, as well as Chancellors and Vice-Chancellors.

Chancellors and Vice-Chancellors
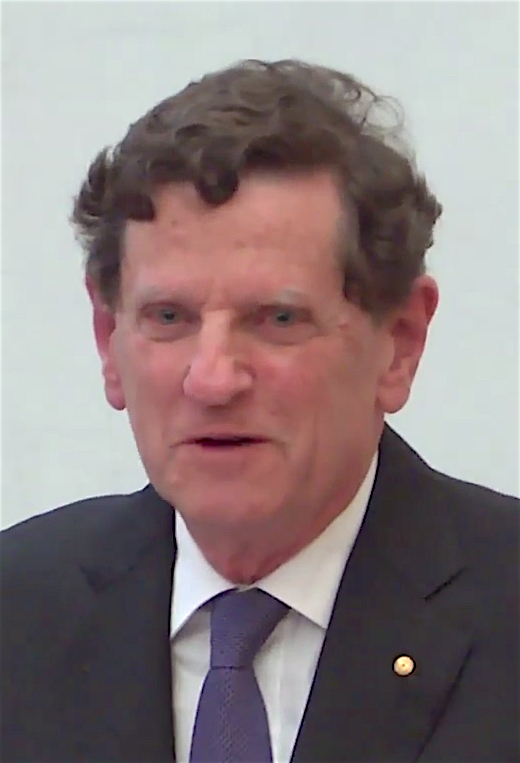
Robert French
Lawyer and judge

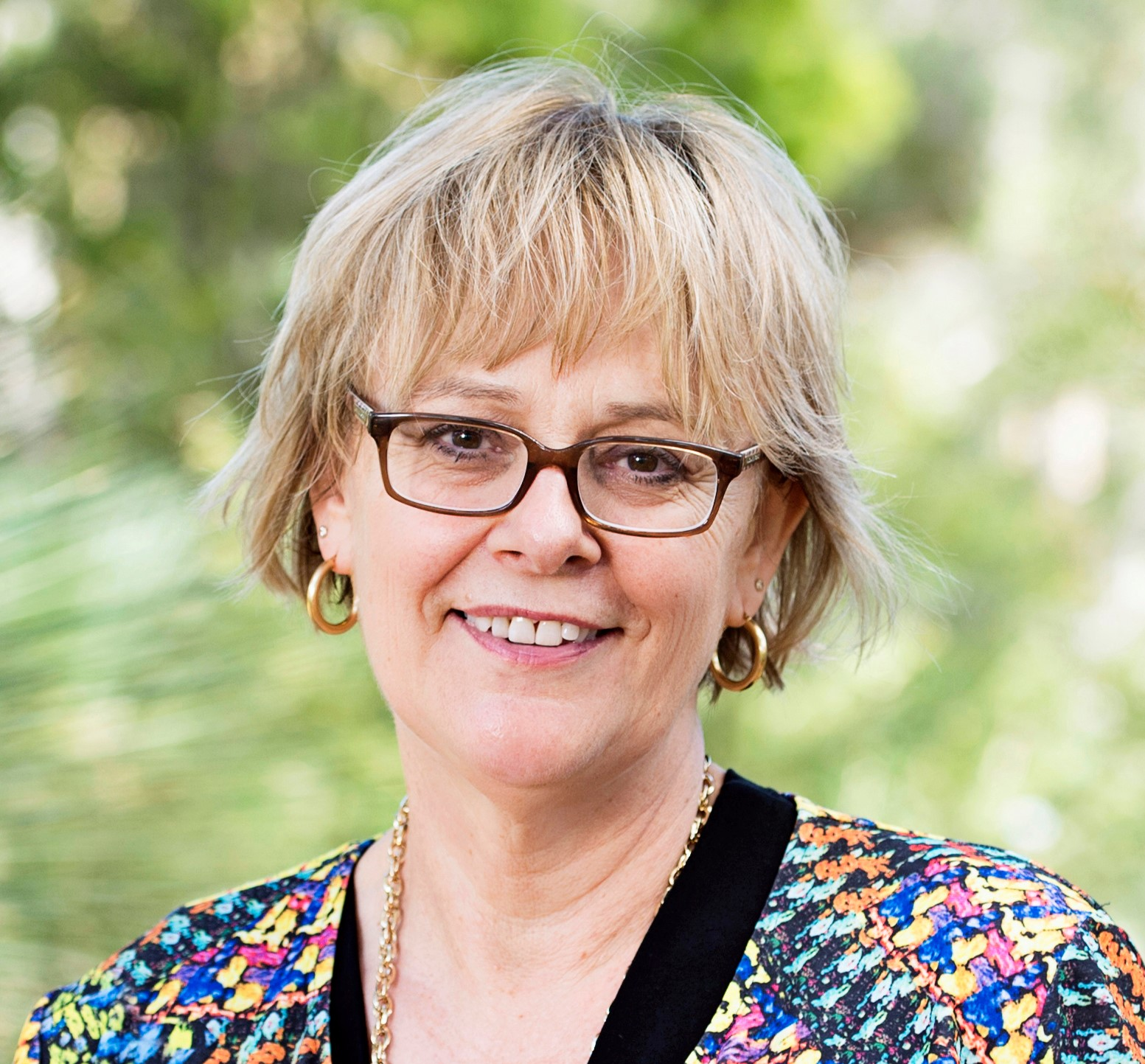
Caroline Finch
Epidemiologist

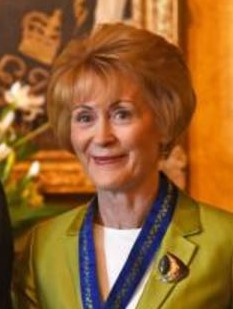
Kerry Sanderson
Public servant
Performing Arts
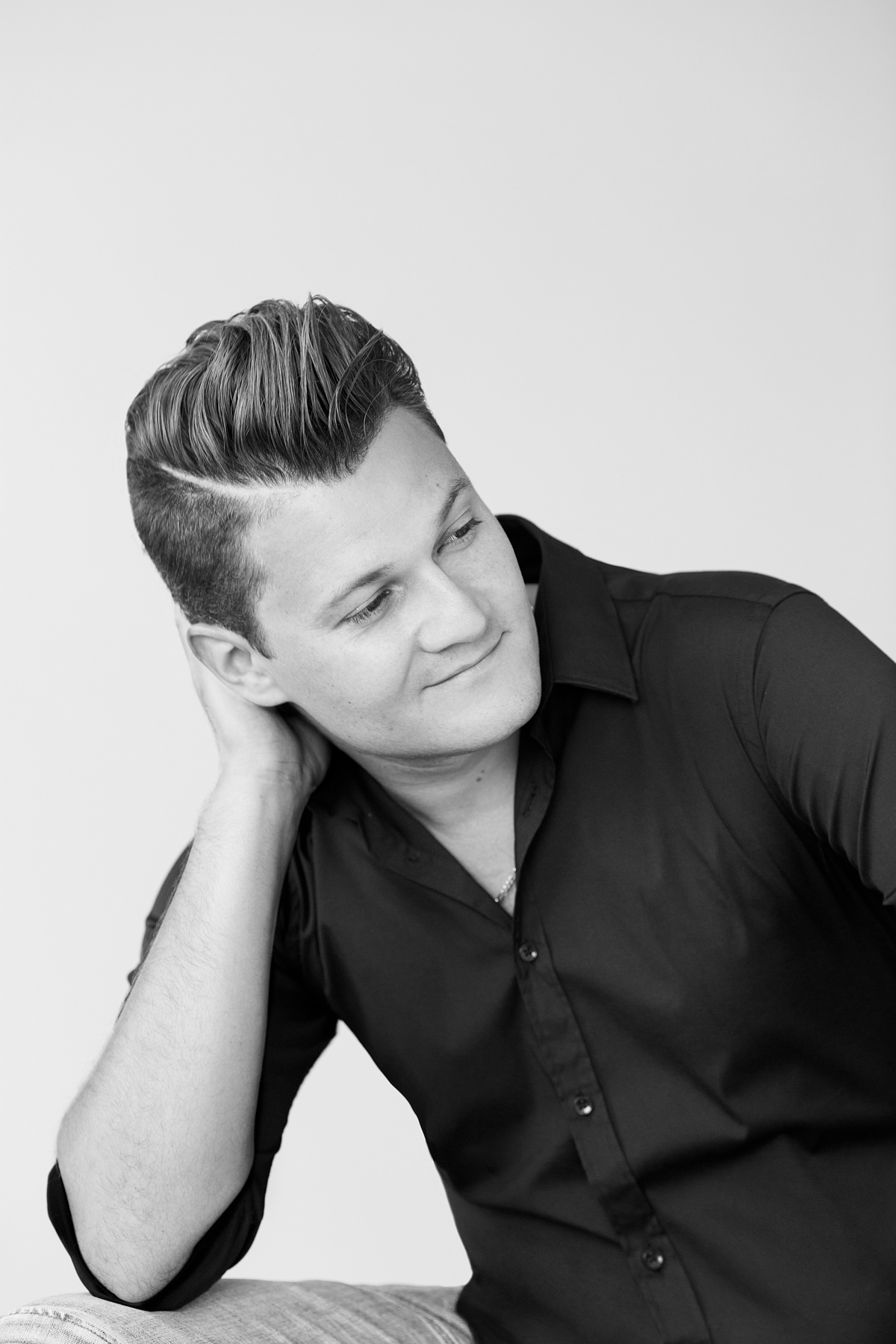
Alexandre Da Costa
Music conductor

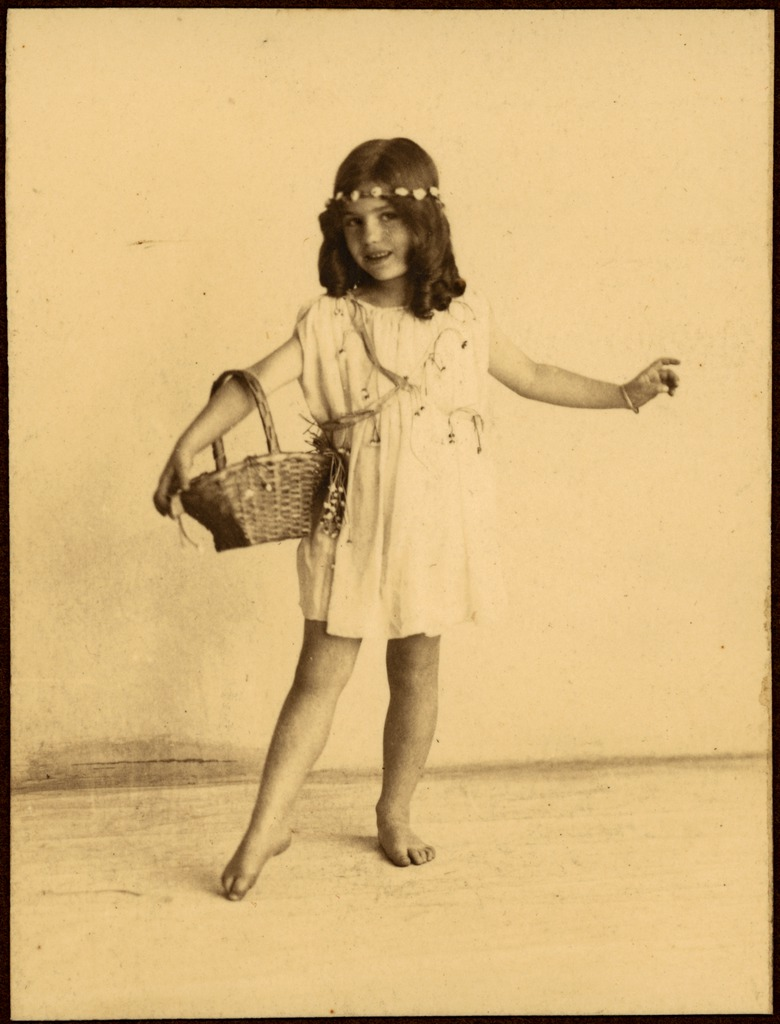
Peggy van Praagh
Ballet educator

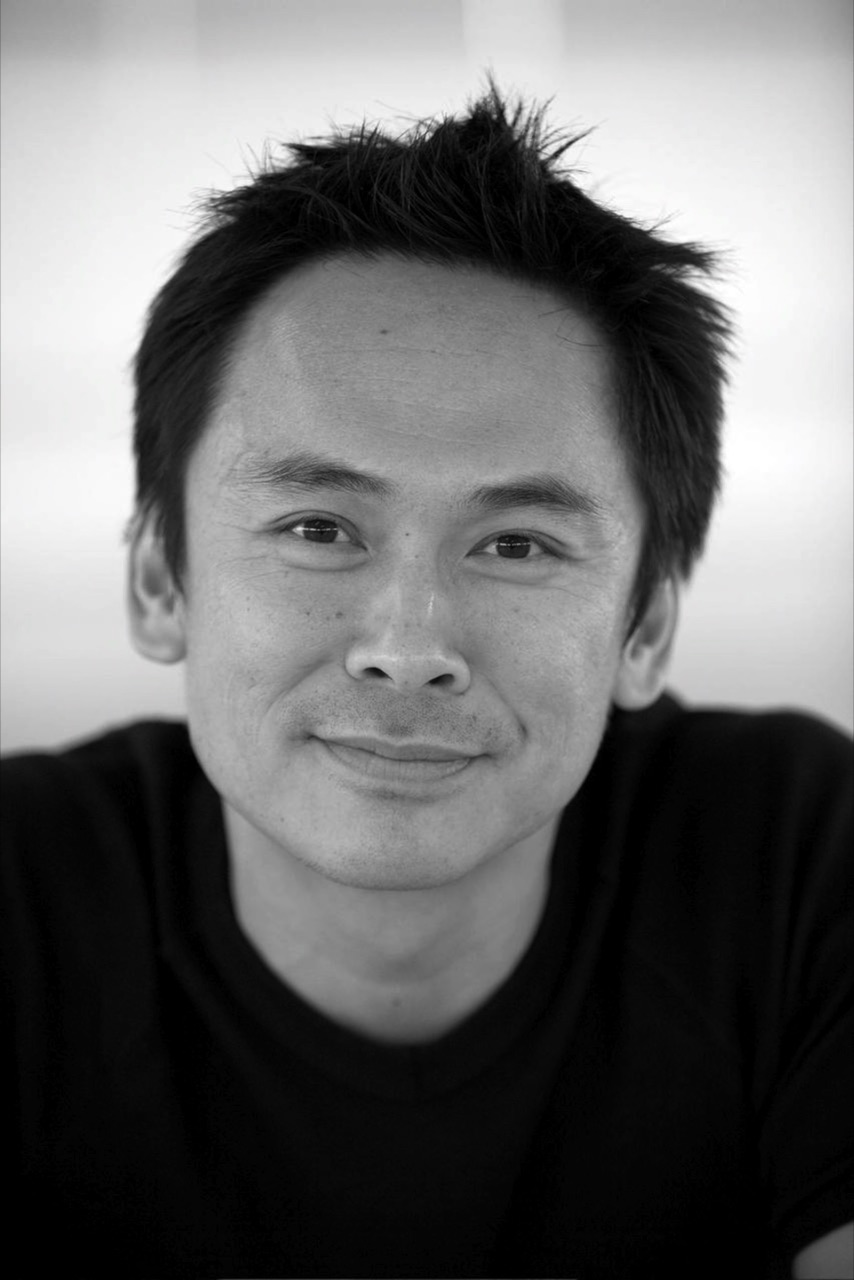
Darren Yap
Actor-director

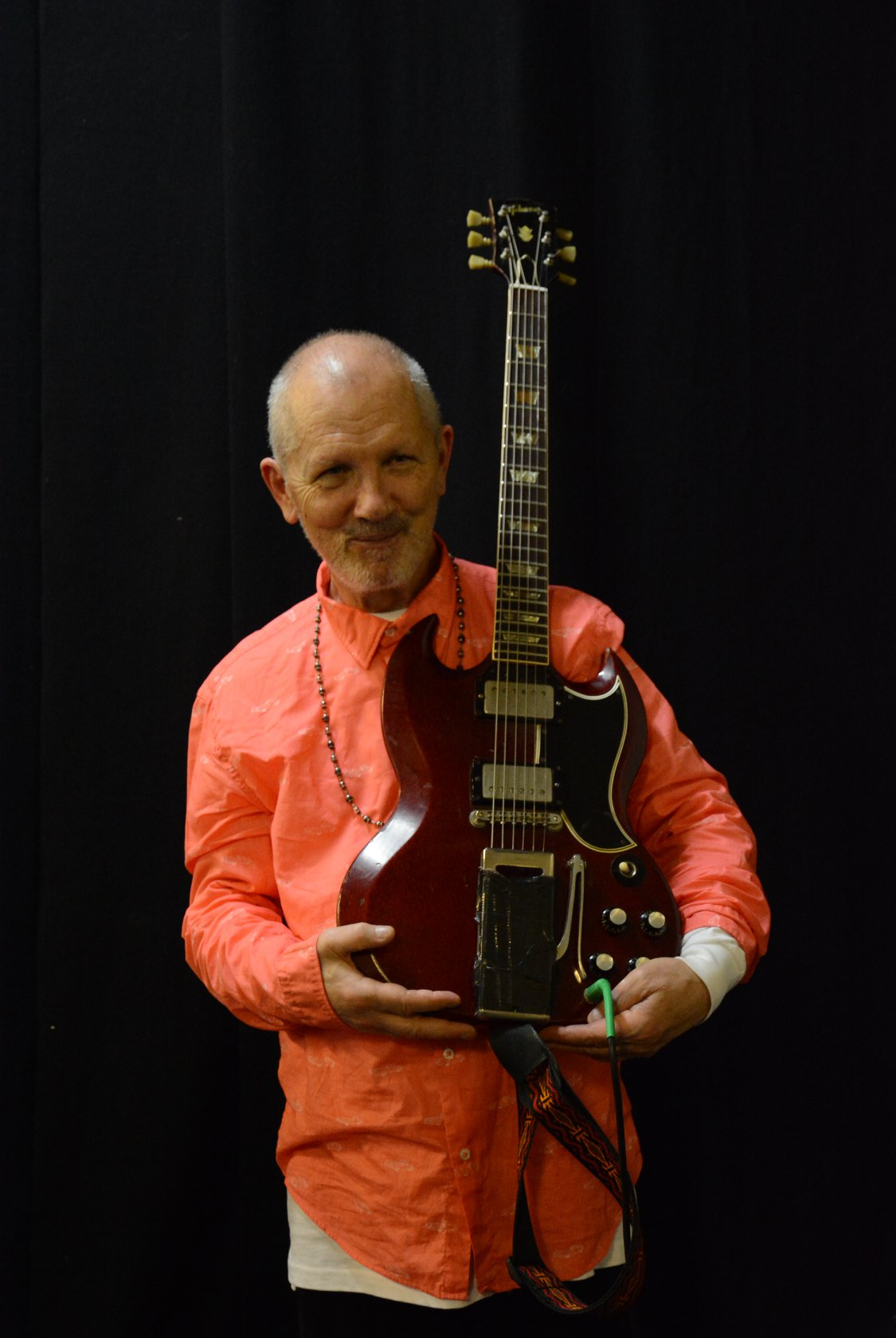
Steve Tallis
Singer-songwriter

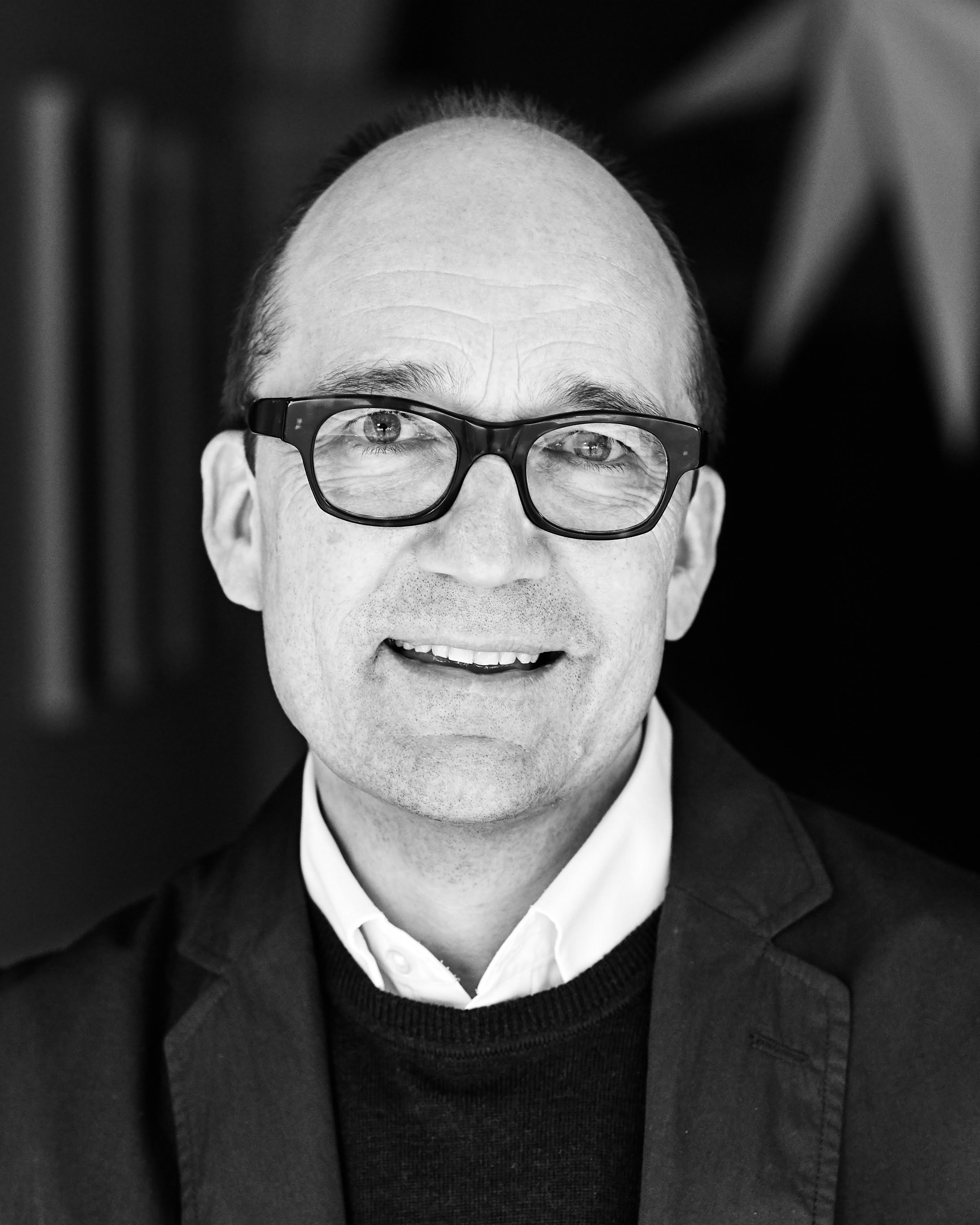
Thomas de Mallet Burgess
Opera director

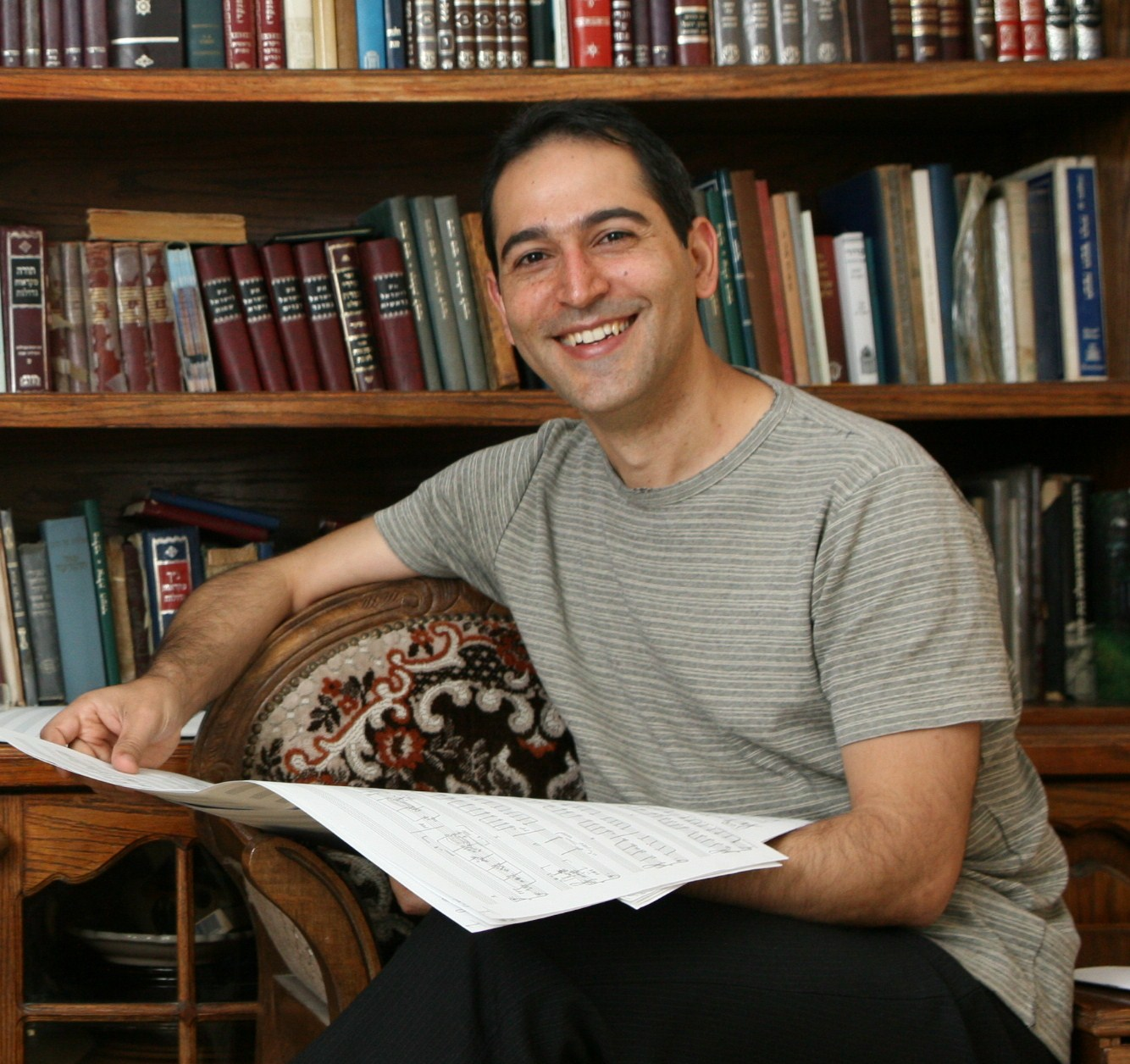
Yitzhak Yedid
Classical composer

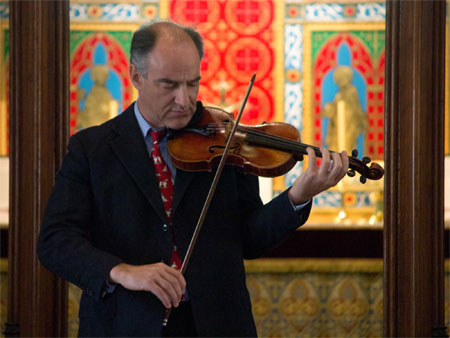
Peter Tanfield
British violinist

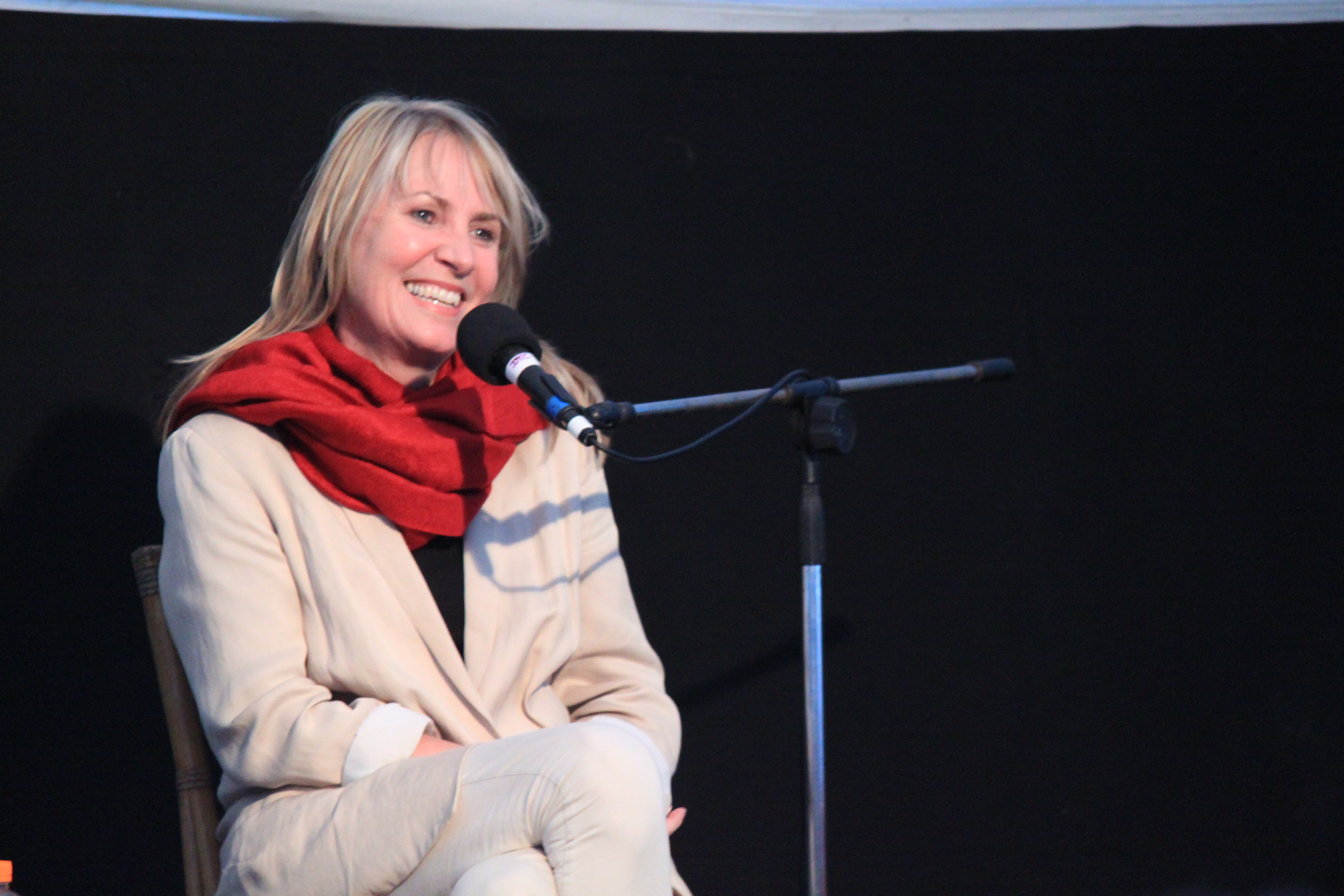
Ailsa Piper
Writer and director

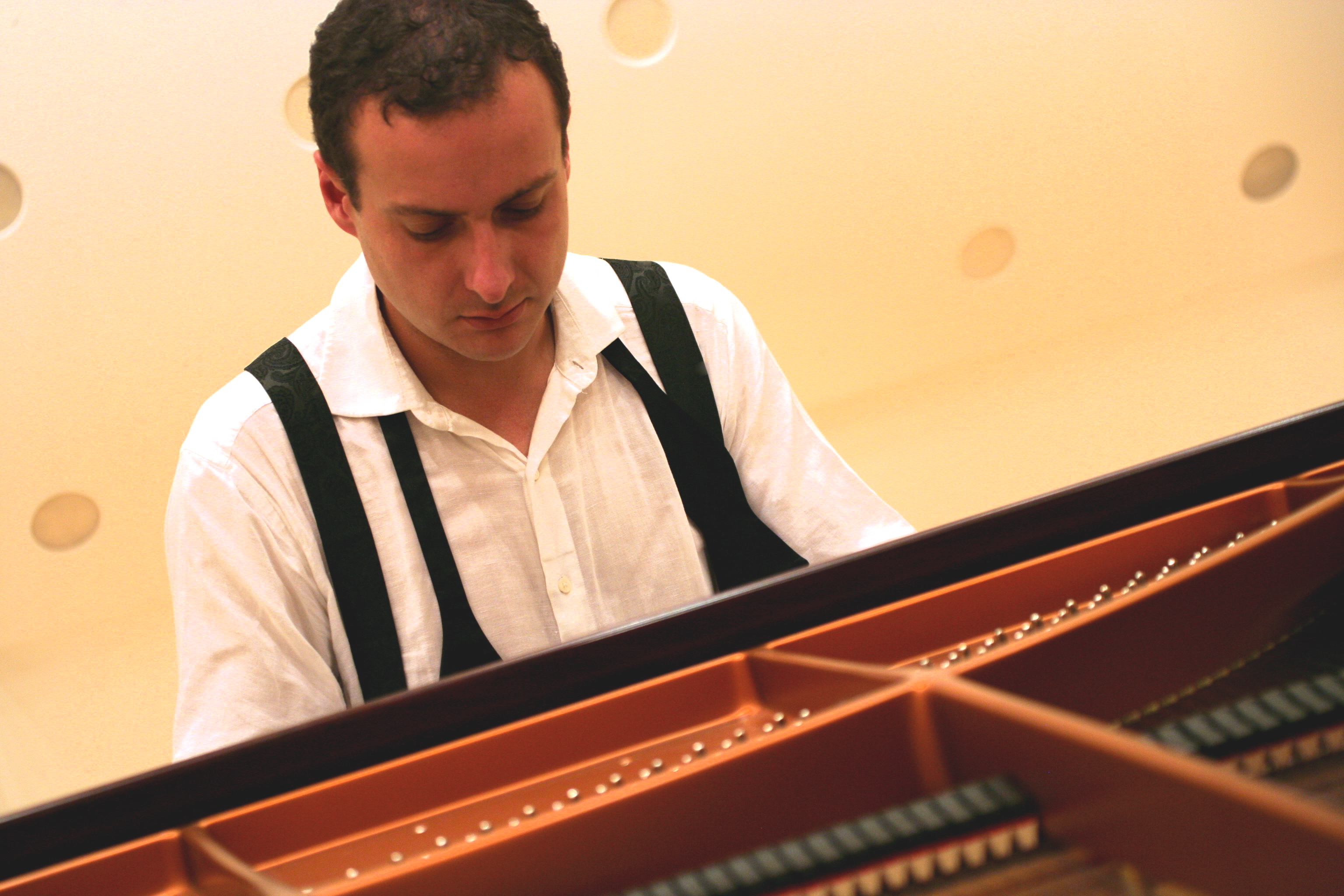
Mark Gasser
Concert pianist

Geoffery Lancaster
Music conductor

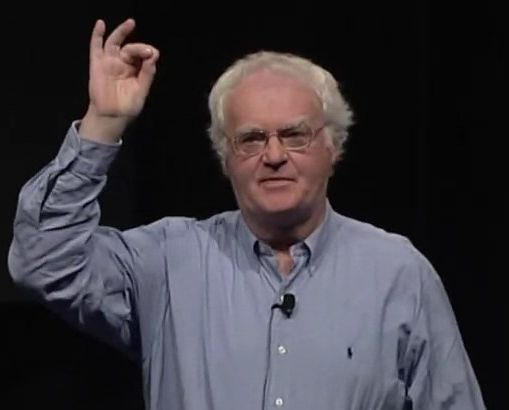
Richard Gill
Music conductor
Science
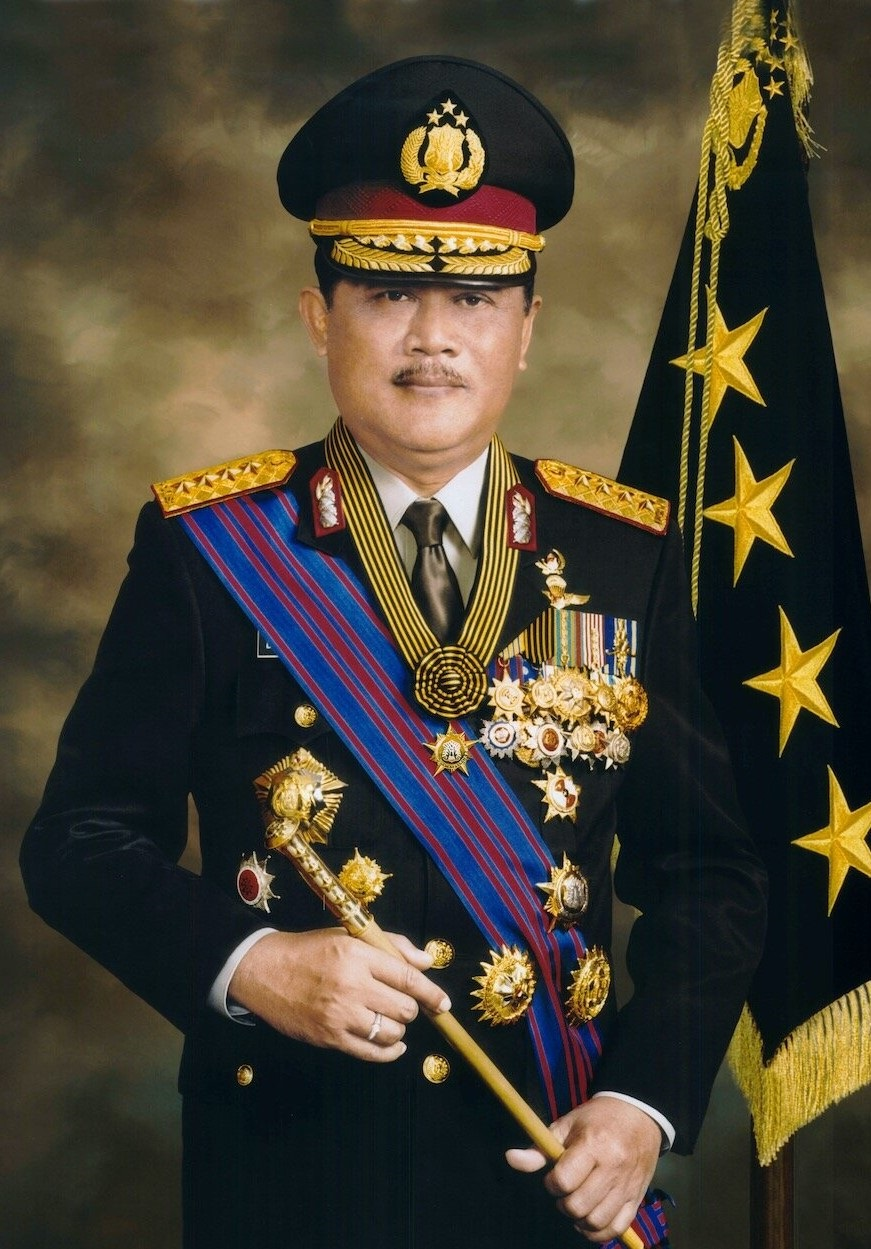
Da'i Bachtiar
Police-general

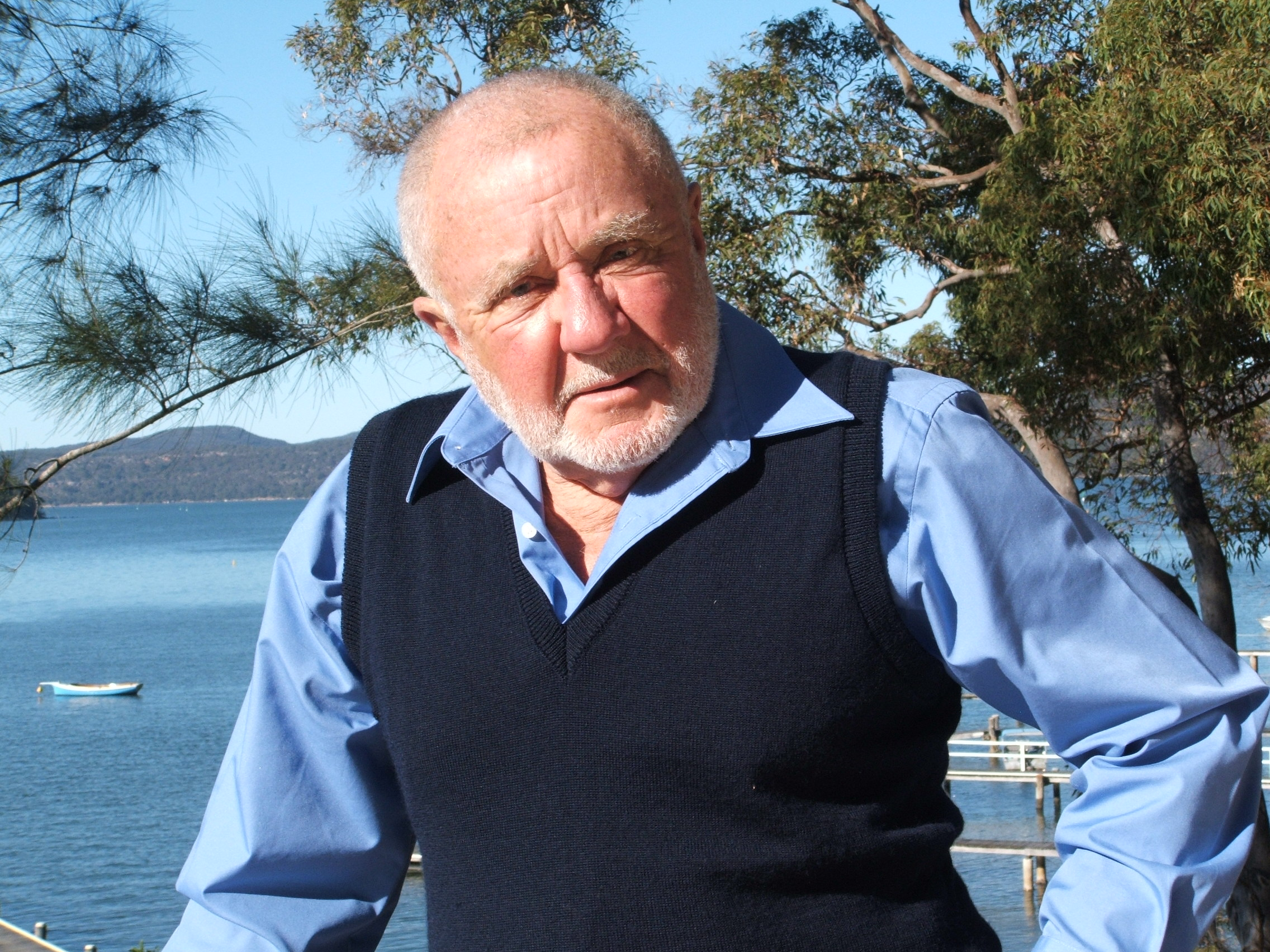
Harry Recher
Ornithologist

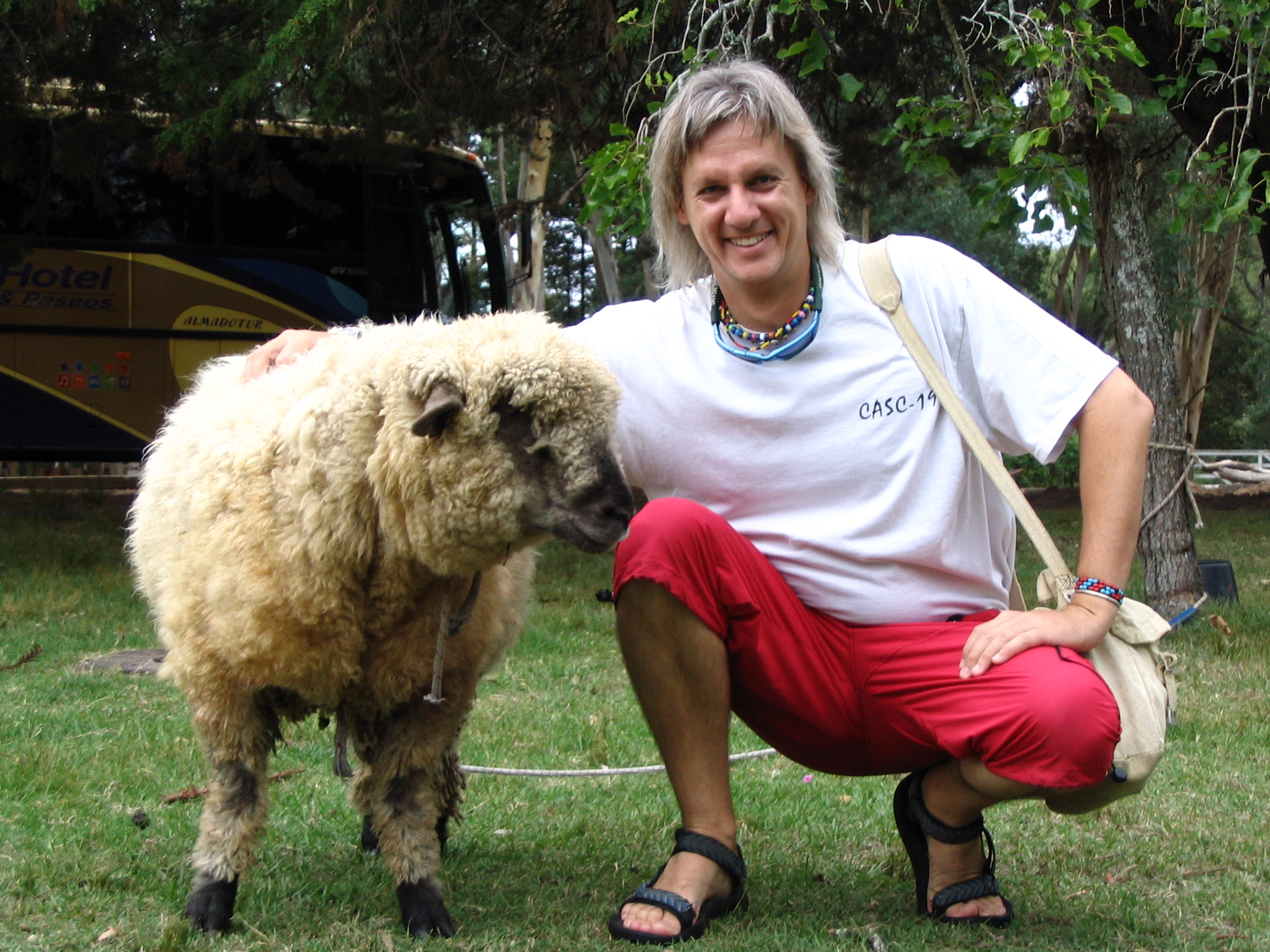
Geoff Sutcliffe
Computer scientist working in automated reasoning, a sub-field of artificial intelligence

== See also ==
- List of universities in Australia
- Perth Institute of Business and Technology
