= Politics of Edinburgh =

The politics of Edinburgh are expressed in the deliberations and decisions of the City of Edinburgh Council, in elections to the council, the Scottish Parliament and the UK Parliament.

Also, as Scotland's capital city, Edinburgh is host to the Scottish Parliament and the main offices of the Scottish Government.

The City of Edinburgh became a unitary council area in 1996, under the Local Government etc. (Scotland) Act 1994, with the boundaries of the post-1975 City of Edinburgh district of the Lothian region.

As one of the unitary local government areas of Scotland, the City of Edinburgh has a defined structure of governance, generally under the Local Government etc. (Scotland) Act 1994, with The City of Edinburgh Council governing on matters of local administration such as housing, planning, local transport, parks and local economic development and regeneration. For such purposes the City of Edinburgh is divided into 17 wards.

The next tier of government is that of the Scottish Parliament, which legislates on matters of Scottish "national interest", such as healthcare, education, the environment and agriculture, devolved to it by the Parliament of the United Kingdom. For elections to the Scottish Parliament (at the Scottish Parliament Building, in the Holyrood area of Edinburgh), the city area is divided among six Scottish Parliament constituencies, each returning one Member of the Scottish Parliament (MSP), and is within the Lothians electoral region.

The Parliament of the United Kingdom (at the Palace of Westminster) legislates on matters such as taxation, foreign policy, defence, employment and trade. For elections to the House of Commons of this parliament, the city area is divided among five United Kingdom Parliamentary constituencies, with each constituency returning one Member of Parliament (MP) by the first past the post system of election.

On 18 September 2014, Edinburgh voted "No" in the Independence referendum by 61.1% to 38.9% with an 84.4% turnout rate.

== The City of Edinburgh Council ==
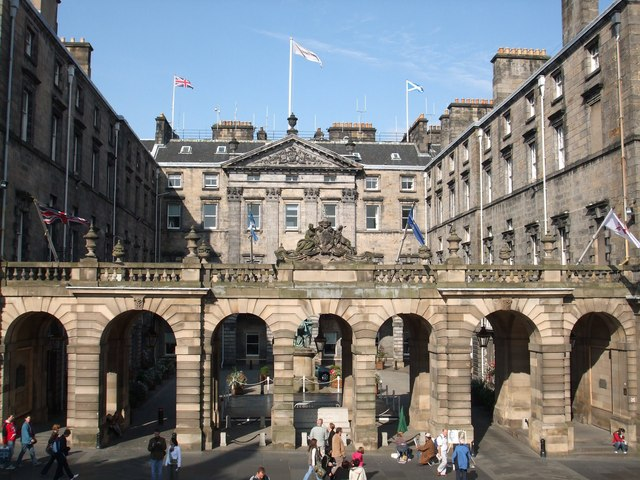
Edinburgh City Chambers, headquarters of the council

The current Lord Provost of Edinburgh is Robert Aldridge, who replaced Frank Ross in 2022. In Scotland, the Lord Provost fulfils many similar roles to that of a Mayor in some other countries. Cllr Aldridge has been on the Council since 1984, previously leading the Liberal Democrat group, and was elected unanimously. He was the first Lord Provost to welcome a new monarch (Charles III) to Edinburgh with the Ceremony of the Keys since 1952.

Elections to the Council are held every four/five years electing 63 councillors. The most recent elections took place in May 2022 and the next election will be in May 2027. Prior to May 2022, the Council was controlled by a Labour/Scottish National Party coalition. Following the 2022 election, a minority Labour administration took control, with Cammy Day as the new council leader, replacing former leader Adam McVey.

As of 2013, the Council was the second-largest employer in Edinburgh, with a total of 18,617 employees.

=== Council political composition ===
Party	Councillors
SNP	19
Labour	11
Liberal Democrat	14
Scottish Greens	10
Conservative	9

== The Edinburgh Corporation and former local government ==
Prior to the Local Government (Scotland) Act 1973 Edinburgh was administered by the single tier "Edinburgh Corporation", which covered the "City and Royal Burgh of Edinburgh". As such, the Edinburgh Corporation was responsible for local government services, such as the Edinburgh Corporation Transport Department (Edinburgh Corporation Tramways until 1928). The Edinburgh Corporation had the power to make Burgesses (freemen) of the City of Edinburgh and to grant "Seals of Cause" to Guilds and trade organisations. The Edinburgh Corporation awarded Burgess Tickets through the Lord Dean of Guild, an office in the Corporation. Like the Corporation of the City of London, Burgess Tickets were often awarded along with a 'Freedom Casket' – a container to hold the ticket. Bodies such as the Merchant Company of Edinburgh, the Incorporated Trades of Edinburgh and the High Constables of Edinburgh formed part of the corporation, contributing members of the corporation and law enforcement officers. The Edinburgh Corporation had the power to institute these organisations via the granting of a "Seal of Cause". This empowered a society as "a legal corporation with power to hold property, make its own by-laws and regulations". Other organisations to receive the "Seal of Cause" include The Royal Burgess Golfing Society of Edinburgh, who received their seal on 2 July 1800. The history of the corporation lives on elsewhere around the city, for example in the name of the members of Muirfield golf club, who were granted a charter by the corporation in 1800 becoming "The Honourable Company of Edinburgh Golfers". Many of Edinburgh's ceremonies and traditions date back to the days of the Edinburgh Corporation, such as the Edinburgh Ceremony of the Keys, where the Lord Provost symbolically hands the keys to the City of Edinburgh to the monarch, who hands them back to the Lord Provost proclaiming "that they cannot be placed in better hands than those of the Lord Provost and Councillors of my good City of Edinburgh".

In 1975, Edinburgh Corporation was abolished. The new two-tier system consisted of Lothian Regional Council (with responsibility for water, education, social work and transport) and the City of Edinburgh District Council (with responsibility for cleansing and libraries). The City of Edinburgh became a single-tier council area in 1996, under the Local Government etc. (Scotland) Act 1994, with the boundaries of the City of Edinburgh district of the Lothian region. The district had been created in 1975, under the Local Government (Scotland) Act 1973, to include the former county of city of Edinburgh; the former burgh of Queensferry, the district of Kirkliston and part of Winchburgh formerly within the county of West Lothian; and the district of Currie and the parish of Cramond formerly within the county of Midlothian.

== Parliament of the United Kingdom ==
For elections to the House of Commons of the Parliament of the United Kingdom, the city is divided among five constituencies, each of which elects one Member of Parliament (MP) by the first past the post system of election. All five constituencies are entirely within the city area.

Prior to the 2005 United Kingdom general election, Edinburgh House of Commons constituencies had exactly the same names and boundaries as the Scottish Parliament constituencies listed above. However, in order to reduce Scotland's historical over representation in the House of Commons, Scotland's share of constituencies was reduced from 72 to 59, in accordance with proposals drawn up by the Boundary Commission for Scotland. The Scottish Parliament (Constituencies) Act 2004 enabled Scottish Parliament constituencies to remain unaltered despite new arrangements for House of Commons constituencies, which resulted in the loss of one Edinburgh constituency and redrawing of boundaries for the others. As a result of the boundary review:

- Edinburgh Central constituency was abolished and split between the original Edinburgh North and Leith and Edinburgh West constituencies and an entirely new constituency that was created – Edinburgh South West.
- Edinburgh East and Musselburgh took in parts of the Edinburgh North and Leith seat, with the town of Musselburgh being transferred into the East Lothian constituency, with the new seat renamed Edinburgh East.
- Edinburgh Pentlands constituency was also divided between the new Edinburgh South West seat and the existing Edinburgh South seat.
- Edinburgh North and Leith was increased in size by taking in parts of the old Edinburgh Central constituency.
- Edinburgh South was expanded in size taking in elements of the old Edinburgh Pentlands seat.
- Edinburgh South West was an entirely new constituency created for the 2005 UK general election taking in elements of the old Edinburgh Central seat, the original Edinburgh West seat and Edinburgh Pentlands seat.
- Edinburgh West was expanded to include some parts of the defunct Edinburgh Central seat.

Current political composition:

Party	Constituency	Member
Scottish Labour Party	Edinburgh East and Musselburgh	Chris Murray
Scottish Labour Party	Edinburgh North and Leith	Tracy Gilbert
Scottish Labour Party	Edinburgh South	Ian Murray
Scottish Labour Party	Edinburgh South West	Scott Arthur
Scottish Liberal Democrats	Edinburgh West	Christine Jardine

=== Constituencies since 1708 ===
Edinburgh has been used in ten different constituency names since 1708, the date of the first election to the Parliament of Great Britain (which was merged into the Parliament of the United Kingdom in 1801). There have been up to six Edinburgh constituencies at any one time.

Two names, Edinburgh South and Edinburgh West have been in continuous use since 1885. One name, Edinburgh East, also first used in 1885, fell out of use in 1997 and returned to use in 2005.

Survival of a name does not in itself mean that a constituency's boundaries have been unaltered.

Lists of constituencies:

Period	Constituencies
1708 to 1885	Edinburgh
1885 to 1918	Edinburgh Central, Edinburgh East, Edinburgh South and Edinburgh West
1918 to 1950	Edinburgh Central, Edinburgh East, Edinburgh Leith, Edinburgh North, Edinburgh South and Edinburgh West
1950 to 1983	Edinburgh Central, Edinburgh East, Edinburgh Leith, Edinburgh North, Edinburgh Pentlands, Edinburgh South and Edinburgh West
1983 to 1997	Edinburgh Central, Edinburgh East, Edinburgh Leith, Edinburgh Pentlands, Edinburgh South and Edinburgh West
1997 to 2005	Edinburgh Central, Edinburgh East and Musselburgh, Edinburgh North and Leith, Edinburgh Pentlands, Edinburgh South and Edinburgh West
2005 to present	Edinburgh East, Edinburgh North and Leith, Edinburgh South, Edinburgh South West and Edinburgh West

== Scottish Parliament ==
For elections to the Scottish Parliament, the city is divided among six of the nine constituencies in the Lothian electoral region. Each constituency elects one Member of the Scottish Parliament (MSP) by the first past the post system of election, and the region elects seven additional members (also called MSPs) to produce a form of proportional representation.

Until the 2005 United Kingdom general election, Edinburgh Scottish Parliament and Parliament of the United Kingdom constituencies were coterminous (shared the same geographical boundaries). The Scottish Parliament (Constituencies) Act 2004, a piece of United Kingdom Parliament legislation, had removed the link, to enable Scottish Parliament constituencies to retain established boundaries despite the introduction of new boundaries for United Kingdom Parliament constituencies.

In the 2016 Scottish Parliament election, the six Edinburgh constituencies elected 4 Scottish National Party MSPs, one Labour and one Liberal Democrat MSP:

Party	Constituency	Member
Scottish National Party	Edinburgh Central	Angus Robertson
Scottish National Party	Edinburgh Eastern	Ash Denham
Scottish National Party	Edinburgh Northern and Leith	Ben Macpherson
Scottish National Party	Edinburgh Pentlands	Gordon MacDonald
Scottish Labour Party	Edinburgh Southern	Daniel Johnson
Scottish Liberal Democrats	Edinburgh Western	Alex Cole-Hamilton

The following additional members were elected to represent the Lothian electoral region:

Party	Member
Scottish Conservatives	Miles Briggs
Scottish Conservatives	Sue Webber
Scottish Conservatives	Jeremy Balfour
Scottish Labour Party	Sarah Boyack
Scottish Labour Party	Foysol Choudhury
Scottish Green Party	Alison Johnstone
Scottish Green Party	Lorna Slater

== Scottish Independence referendum, 2014 ==
At the 2014 Scottish independence referendum voters in Edinburgh rejected independence by a margin of 61.1% No to 38.9% Yes. Turnout was 84.4%. Numerically, Edinburgh had the largest number of No votes out of all 32 council areas in Scotland with 194,638 No votes to 123,927 Yes votes. The difference between the number of Yes and No votes was largest in Edinburgh by comparison to any other council area in Scotland at 70,711. The results were in marked contrast to those in Glasgow, where each of the city's constituencies voted Yes.

=== Results by UK Parliament constituency ===
A map of the 2014 Scottish independence referendum results by UK Parliamentary constituency in City of Edinburgh, where saturation of colour denotes strength of vote.

UK Parliament constituency	Yes votes	No votes	Yes (%)	No (%)	Valid votes
Edinburgh East	27,500	30,632	47.3%	52.7%	58,232
Edinburgh North and Leith	28,813	43,253	40.0%	60.0%	72,181
Edinburgh South	20,340	38,298	34.7%	65.3%	58,738
Edinburgh South West	24,659	39,509	38.4%	61.6%	64,249
Edinburgh West	22,615	42,946	34.5%	65.5%	65,625
City of Edinburgh	123,927	194,638	38.9%	61.1%	319,025

== UK European Union membership referendum, 2016 ==
In 2016, Edinburgh voted in the European Union membership referendum. While the United Kingdom as a whole voted to leave the EU, Edinburgh overwhelmingly voted to Remain, giving the ninth highest Remain vote share of any counting area. Only Gibraltar and seven boroughs in London had higher vote shares for Remain.

UK Parliament constituency	Leave votes	Remain votes	Leave (%)	Remain (%)	Valid votes
Edinburgh East	12,153	31,821	27.8%	72.4%	43,974
Edinburgh North and Leith	12,435	44,618	21.8%	78.2%	57,053
Edinburgh South	10,549	37,069	22.2%	77.8%	47,618
Edinburgh South West	14,008	36,269	27.9%	72.1%	50,277
Edinburgh West	15,353	38,019	28.7%	71.3%	53,372
City of Edinburgh	64,498	187,796	25.6%	74.4%	252,294

== See also ==
- Incorporated Trades of Edinburgh
- List of Lord Provosts of Edinburgh
- Lothian Regional Council
- Scottish Parliament (Constituencies) Act 2004
- Politics of Aberdeen
- Politics of Dundee
- Politics of Glasgow
- Politics of Scotland
- Politics of the Highland council area
