= Lord Provost of Edinburgh =

Ceremonial officer in Edinburgh, Scotland

- Scottish Gaelic: Morair Pròbhaist Dhùn Èideann
- Coat of Arms of the City of Edinburgh Council
- Incumbent; Robert Aldridge since 26 May 2022
- City of Edinburgh Council
- Style: The Right Honourable
- Type: Convener/Chairperson
- Member of: City of Edinburgh Council
- Reports to: City of Edinburgh Council
- Seat: Edinburgh
- Nominator: City of Edinburgh Council
- Appointer: City of Edinburgh Council
- Inaugural holder: John of Whiteness
- Formation: 13th Century
- First holder: John of Whiteness
- Deputy: Deputy Lord Provost of Edinburgh

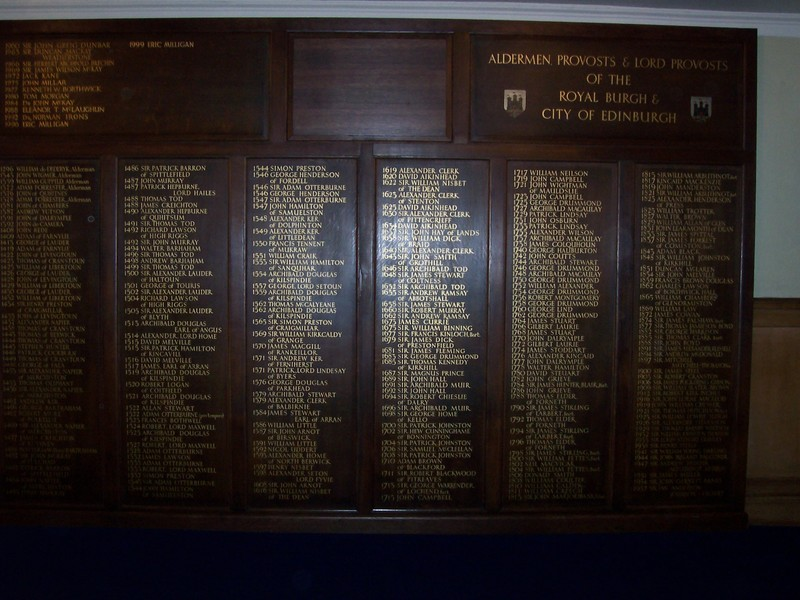
List of Lords Provost in Edinburgh City Chambers

The Right Honourable Lord Provost of Edinburgh is elected by and is the convener of the City of Edinburgh Council and serves not only as the chair of that body, but as a figurehead for the entire city, ex officio the Lord-Lieutenant of Edinburgh and honorarily the Admiral of the Firth of Forth. It is the equivalent in many ways to the institution of Mayor that exists in many other countries.

While some of Scotland's local authorities elect a Provost, only the four main cities (Edinburgh, Glasgow, Aberdeen and Dundee) have a Lord Provost. In Edinburgh this position dates from 1667, when Charles II elevated the Provost to the status of Lord Provost, with the same rank and precedence as the Lord Mayor of London. The title of Lord Provost is enshrined in the Local Government etc. (Scotland) Act 1994.

== Roles and traditions ==
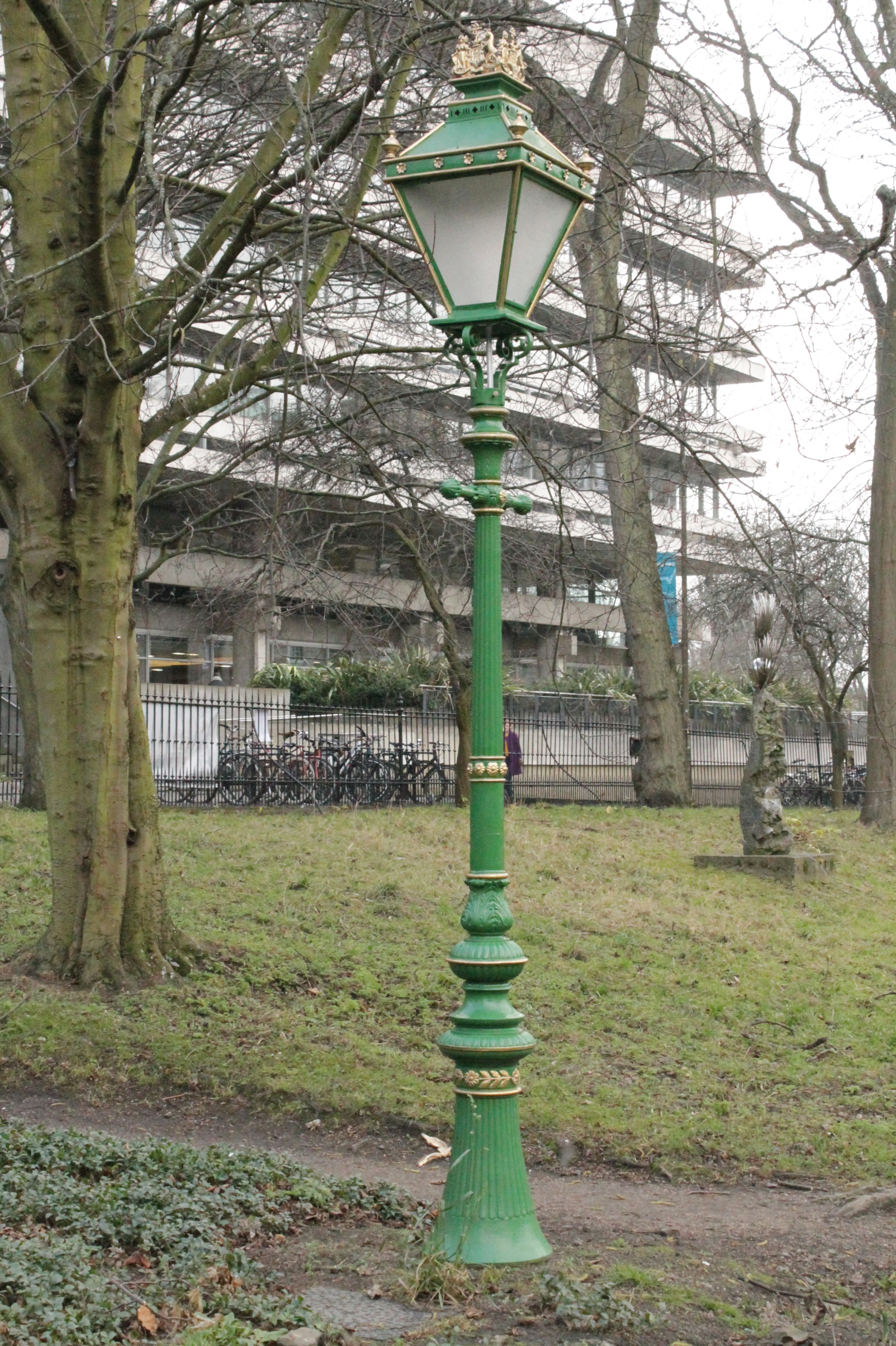
A Baillie lamp in George Square, Edinburgh

Prior to the Local Government (Scotland) Act 1973, the City of Edinburgh was run by a single-tier body called the Edinburgh Corporation, of which the Lord Provost was chair. Similar to the Corporation of the City of London, the body included council representatives from the Incorporated Trades of Edinburgh and the Merchant Company of Edinburgh. The corporation's security was provided by the High Constables of Edinburgh, who also served as the Lord Provost's bodyguard. Although the 1973 Act changed the governance of the city, the Lord Provost retains a relationship with the Merchants Company and Incorporated Trades. The High Constables continue to serve as the Lord Provost's ceremonial bodyguards. The Lord Provost is also by virtue of their office the Lord High Admiral of the Firth of Forth.

The Lord Provost chairs meetings of Edinburgh City Council at the Edinburgh City Chambers, originally opened in 1760 by Lord Provost George Drummond as a meeting place for Edinburgh merchants and known as the Edinburgh Royal Exchange. The Lord Provost takes part in a number of ceremonies and traditions, including The Edinburgh Ceremony of the Keys, the Kirking of the Deacons, The Riding of the Marches and the Edinburgh Hogmanay. The Lord Provost also coordinates Armed Forces Day parades with both the Royal Scots Dragoon Guards and The Royal Regiment of Scotland.

Whilst the Lord Provost technically has no official residence, Lauriston Castle - a property bequeathed to the Edinburgh Corporation and now under the ownership of Edinburgh City Council - has been used to host the Lord Provost's annual Garden Party. It was suggested in 2013 that Lauriston Castle be renovated and turned into an official residence for the Lord Provost. However the cost was deemed too high.

The High Constables also form the Lord Provost's Platoon at the Edinburgh Military Tattoo.

The Lord Provost also has a team of six bailies to support their work, appointed by Edinburgh City Council.

Whenever the monarch is in residence in Edinburgh, the Lord Provost is called upon to undertake the Ceremony of the Keys (Edinburgh).

The Lord Provost has a reserved pew at Kirk of the Canongate. This is because historically the gift of the living lay with the bailies of Canongate, but when Canongate merged with Edinburgh in 1856, so too did this power.

=== Lamps ===
Lord Provosts are entitled to two ceremonial Baillie's Lamps outside their home in the city (few chose this to be done). These are green and gold street lamps. These lamps remain in place for the duration of the Lord Provost's term in office. When they demit the office one was removed, while the other remains for the duration of the Lord Provost's life or occupancy of said building.

=== Car ===
The Lord Provost's official car bears the licence plate S0. This licence plate was issued specially by the Ministry of Transport after the Edinburgh corporation missed out on acquiring Scotland's first number plate, S1 at the turn of the 20th century. A number of other licence plates are owned by the council for other official vehicles, including S10 and SS10. In 2012 it was proposed that the licence plates could be sold to help raise funds for the city, however this plan does not appear to have gone ahead.

In 2025, two new cars were purchased to replace the Lord Provost's two official cars. The new vehicles, which cost £64,620 each, will also be used by the Depute Lord Provost and by visiting royalty. They were expected to be retained for ten years.

=== Civic regalia ===
The Lord Provost wears civic regalia (badge and chain of office) while on official business. The chain, which dates from 1899, was made by the firm of Brook and Son in George Street. It is made of 18-carat (75 per cent pure) gold, 46 inches (120 cm) in length, 1 inch (2.5 cm) wide and weighs between 40 and 50 oz (1.1 to 1.4 kg). It carries 470 brilliant and 22 rose diamonds, each weighing between 23 and 24 carats (4.6 to 4.8 g), and a jewel depicting the city's coat of arms.

== Current and past Lord Provosts ==
The incumbent Lord Provost is Robert Aldridge. He has served on the council continuously since 1984, and was previously the leader of the Liberal Democrat group. He was elected Lord Provost unanimously.

In total, there have been 258 Provosts and Lord Provosts.
