= 1999 City of Edinburgh Council election =

1999 Scottish local government election

← 1995	6 May 1999	2003 →

All 58 seats to Edinburgh City Council 30 seats needed for a majority
- Turnout: 61.0 (▲16.5%)
	First party	Second party
Party	Labour	Liberal Democrats
Last election	34	10
Seats won	31	13
Seat change	▼3	▲3
Popular vote	73,003	54,791
Percentage	32.5%	24.4%
Swing	▼8.2%	▲6.3%
	Third party	Fourth party
Party	Conservative	SNP
Last election	14	0
Seats won	13	1
Seat change	▼1	▲1
Popular vote	50,630	46,184
Percentage	22.5%	20.5%
Swing	▼0.8%	▲3.2%
- Map of council wards
Council control before election
Labour
Council control after election
Labour

Elections to the City of Edinburgh Council were held on 6 May 1999, the same day as the other Scottish local government elections and the Scottish Parliament general election. Turnout was 61%, an increase of 16.5% on the 1995 turnout.

City of Edinburgh Council election, 1999 Turnout: 224,819
Party	Seats	Gains	Losses	Net gain/loss	Seats %	Votes %	Votes	+/−
Labour	31			▼3		32.5	73,003	▼8.2
Liberal Democrats	13			▲3		24.4	54,791	▲6.3
Conservative	13			▼1		22.5	50,630	▼0.8
SNP	1			▲1	1.7	20.5	46,184	▲3.2
Independent	0			0	0.0	0.1	211	0.0
