= City of Edinburgh Council =

Local government body in Scotland

City of Edinburgh Council Comhairle Baile Dhùn Èideann
- Coat of arms

- Logo

Type
- Type: Unitary authority

History
- Preceded by: City of Edinburgh District Council

Leadership
- Lord Provost: Robert Aldridge, Liberal Democrat since 26 May 2022
- Leader: Jane Meagher, Labour since 19 December 2024
- Chief Executive: Paul Lawrence since 17 June 2024

Structure
- Seats: 63 councillors
- Graph of the party split among 63 seats.
- Political groups: Administration (12) Labour (12) Other parties (51) Liberal Democrats (14) SNP (15) Green (12) Conservative (10)
- Length of term: 5 years

Elections
- Voting system: Single transferable vote
- Last election: 5 May 2022
- Next election: 6 May 2027

Motto
- Nisi Dominus Frustra

Meeting place
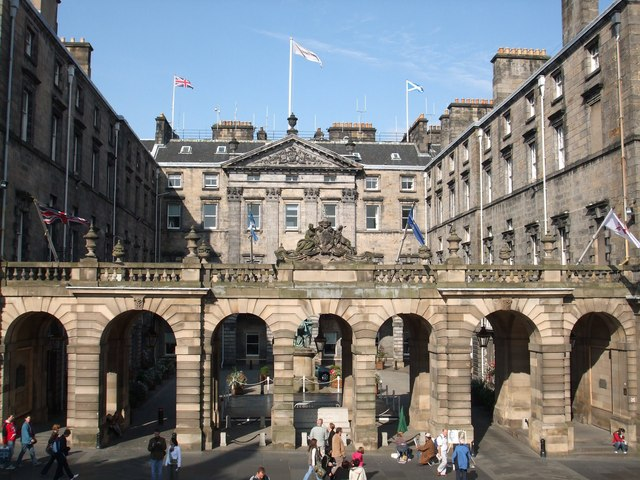
- Edinburgh City Chambers

Website
- www.edinburgh.gov.uk

The City of Edinburgh Council (Scottish Gaelic: Comhairle Baile Dhùn Èideann) is the local government authority covering the City of Edinburgh council area. Almost half of the council area is the built-up area of Edinburgh, capital of Scotland. With a population of 531,370 in 2025, it is the second most populous local authority area in Scotland.

The council took on its current form in 1996 under the Local Government etc. (Scotland) Act 1994, replacing the City of Edinburgh District Council of the Lothian region, which had been created in 1975. The history of local government in Edinburgh, however, stretches back much further. Around 1130, David I made the town a royal burgh and a burgh council, based at the Old Tolbooth is recorded continuously from the 14th century.

The council is based in Edinburgh City Chambers with its main administrative office nearby at Waverley Court.

== History ==
=== Origins ===
The date of Edinburgh's formation as a burgh is unknown, but it is referred to as a royal burgh from the reign of David I (reigned 1124–1153). The town council of the burgh was granted the right to appoint its own sheriff by James III in a charter dated 16 November 1482. This had the effect of making the town a county of itself, separating it from the jurisdiction of the surrounding county of Midlothian (which was formally called the "county of Edinburgh" or Edinburghshire until 1947). The burgh was subsequently described as the "city and county of the city of Edinburgh" to distinguish it from the surrounding "county of Edinburgh" (Midlothian).

Until 1975 the governing body of the city was formally called the "Lord Provost, Magistrates and Council of the City and Royal Burgh of Edinburgh", but was generally termed "Edinburgh Corporation". As such, the Edinburgh Corporation was responsible for local government services, such as the Edinburgh Corporation Transport Department (Edinburgh Corporation Tramways until 1928).

=== Edinburgh Corporation ===
Bodies such as the Merchant Company of Edinburgh, the Incorporated Trades of Edinburgh and The High Constables of Edinburgh formed part of the corporation, contributing councillors and law enforcement officers. The Edinburgh Corporation had the power to institute these organisations via the granting of a "Seal of Cause". This empowered the societies as "a legal corporation with power to hold property, make its own by-laws and regulations". Other organisations to receive the "Seal of Cause" include The Royal Burgess Golfing Society of Edinburgh, who received their seal on 2 July 1800. The history of the corporation lives on elsewhere around the city, for example in the name of the members of Muirfield golf club, who were granted a charter by the corporation in 1800 becoming "The Honourable Company of Edinburgh Golfers". The Corporation also awarded trophies to Edinburgh institutions, such as the silver arrow presented as a prize for archery in 1714 to the Royal Company of Archers, and the silver golf club presented to the Honourable Company of Edinburgh Golfers.

The Edinburgh Corporation had the power to make Burgesses (freemen) of the City of Edinburgh. The Edinburgh Corporation awarded its Burgess Tickets through the Lord Dean of Guild, an office in the Corporation holding the distinction of second citizen of Edinburgh, after the Lord Provost. Like the Corporation of the City of London, Burgess Tickets were often awarded along with a 'Freedom Casket' – a container to hold the ticket.

In 1975, Edinburgh Corporation was abolished under the Local Government (Scotland) Act 1973, which abolished the counties and burghs of Scotland as administrative areas and brought in a two-tier system of upper-tier regions and lower-tier districts. A new district called "City of Edinburgh" was created, covering the former city and county of the city of Edinburgh as well as the former burgh of Queensferry, the district of Kirkliston and part of Winchburgh (from West Lothian), and the district of Currie and the parish of Cramond (from Midlothian). The governing body for the new district was called "City of Edinburgh District Council" and had responsibilities including town planning, cleansing and libraries. The district was included within the Lothian region, and Lothian Regional Council had responsibilities including water, education, social work and transport.

=== City of Edinburgh ===
In 1996, under the Local Government etc. (Scotland) Act 1994, the Lothian Regional Council was abolished and the City of Edinburgh became a unitary (single-tier) council area. The council became "City of Edinburgh Council" and provides all local government services within the council area.

Today Edinburgh's council remains headed by the Lord Provost of Edinburgh, with six Bailies appointed by the council at large. Many of Edinburgh council ceremonies and traditions date back to the days of the Edinburgh Corporation, such as the Edinburgh Ceremony of the Keys, where the Lord Provost symbolically hands the keys to the City of Edinburgh to the monarch, who hands them back to the Lord Provost proclaiming "that they cannot be placed in better hands than those of the Lord Provost and Councillors of my good City of Edinburgh".

The council continues to meet in the Edinburgh City Chambers and also holds and maintains properties from the days of the corporation, such as Lauriston Castle (which is used to host the Lord Provost's garden party), the Assembly Rooms and the Church Hill Theatre. Although no longer formally part of the City of Edinburgh Council, it retains a relationship with the Merchants Company, Incorporated Trades and High Constables of Edinburgh. The office of Lord Dean of Guild now operates from the Merchant Company of Edinburgh, and continues to issue Burgess tickets to create Burgesses of Edinburgh alongside the City of Edinburgh Council.

== Political control ==
The council has been under no overall control since 2007. Since 2022 the council has been led by a Labour minority administration with informal support from the Liberal Democrats and Conservatives.

The first election to the City of Edinburgh District Council was held in 1974, initially operating as a shadow authority alongside the outgoing authorities until the new system came into force on 16 May 1975. A shadow authority was again elected in 1995 ahead of the reforms which came into force on 1 April 1996. Political control of the council since 1975 has been as follows:

City of Edinburgh District Council

Party in control	Years
No overall control	1975–1977
Conservative	1977–1980
No overall control	1980–1984
Labour	1984–1992
No overall control	1992–1996

City of Edinburgh Council

Party in control	Years
Labour	1996–2007
No overall control	2007–

=== Leadership ===
The role of Lord Provost of Edinburgh is largely ceremonial. Political leadership is provided by the leader of the council. The first leader following the 1996 reforms, Keith Geddes, was the last leader of the old Lothian Regional Council. The leaders of the City of Edinburgh Council since 1996 have been:

Councillor	Party	From	To
Keith Geddes	Labour	1 Apr 1996	6 May 1999
Donald Anderson	Labour	May 1999	24 Aug 2006
Ewan Aitken	Labour	29 Aug 2006	May 2007
Jenny Dawe	Liberal Democrats	24 May 2007	May 2012
Andrew Burns	Labour	17 May 2012	May 2017
Adam McVey	SNP	22 Jun 2017	May 2022
Cammy Day	Labour	26 May 2022	9 Dec 2024
Jane Meagher	Labour	19 Dec 2024	

=== Composition ===
Following the 2022 election and subsequent changes up to September 2026, the composition of the council was:

Party	Councillors
SNP	15
Liberal Democrats	14
Green	12
Labour	12
Conservative	10
Total	63

The next election is due in 2027.

== Elections ==
Members of the council represent 17 wards. As a result of the Local Governance (Scotland) Act 2004, multi-member wards were introduced for the 2007 election, each electing three or four councillors by the single transferable vote system, to produce a form of proportional representation. Previously each of 58 wards elected one councillor by the first past the post system of election.

The last election to the council was held on Thursday, 5 May 2022. Due to an increase in the city's population, five extra seats on the council were added in 2017, along with some minor ward boundary changes. Election results since 1995 have been as follows:

Year	Seats	SNP	Labour	Liberal Democrats	Greens	Conservative	Notes
1995	58	0	34	10	0	14	Labour majority
1999	58	1	31	13	0	13	New ward boundaries. Labour majority
2003	58	0	30	15	0	13	Labour majority
2007	58	12	15	17	3	11	New ward boundaries. Lib Dem / SNP
2012	58	18	20	3	6	11	Labour/SNP coalition
2017	63	19	12	6	8	18	New ward boundaries. SNP/Labour minority coalition
2022	63	19	13	12	10	9	Labour minority

== Council area ==
City of Edinburgh Council area Comhairle Baile Dhùn Èideann
- Interactive map of City of Edinburgh Council area
- Coordinates: 55°55′30″N 3°15′36″W
- Sovereign state: United Kingdom
- Country: Scotland
- Lieutenancy area: Edinburgh
- Admin HQ: Edinburgh

Government
  - Body: City of Edinburgh Council

Area
  - Total: 102 sq mi (263 km^{2})
  - Rank: Ranked 23rd

Population (2025)
  - Total: 531,370
  - Rank: Ranked 2nd
  - Density: 5,230/sq mi (2,020/km^{2})
- GSS code: S12000036
- ISO 3166 code: GB-EDH
- Website: www.edinburgh.gov.uk

City of Edinburgh Council area showing the largest settlements. The territory of the council area includes much undeveloped land (denoted by cream colour) to the west of the built-up area (grey colour), but little to the south or east.

The council area borders the Firth of Forth to the north, East Lothian to the east, Midlothian to the south east, Scottish Borders to the south, and West Lothian to the west. About 45% of the council area is the urban area of Edinburgh, which is bounded to the north by the Firth of Forth, particularly including the areas north of the A720 City of Edinburgh bypass.

Edinburgh's city status attaches to the whole council area, despite the area including more rural parts outside the main urban area. The landscape changes to farmland, much of which is designated as green belt, at the north-western and western edge of the main urban area (beyond the River Almond, Cammo estate, West Craigs and Gogar within the Almond ward), and the council area extends around 4 miles (6.4 km) further west from the urban area, taking in the hamlets of Ingliston and Turnhouse adjacent to Edinburgh Airport, the separate villages of Kirkliston, Newbridge, Ratho Station, and the town of South Queensferry beside the Forth Bridges. These are all considered to be separate localities in the Scottish Government's statistics on the basis of being separate urban areas.

South of this, the Pentland Hills ward has a similar semi-rural profile: its furthest point is over 7 miles (11 km) from the A720, and Wester Hailes is its only component neighbourhood within the bypass. However, aside from the village of Ratho and Riccarton (location of Heriot-Watt University), the increasingly distant suburbs in this area along the A70 road – Baberton, Juniper Green, Currie and Balerno – are considered to be part of the locality of Edinburgh as their postcodes remain in a 'chain' with the rest of the city. Almond and Pentland Hills are by far the largest of the council's wards by area due to their low population density balancing against that of inner-city wards.

In contrast to the hinterland in the west, the local authority boundary with East Lothian in the east of the city (north of the end of the bypass within the Portobello/Craigmillar ward) is at the Brunstane Burn at Eastfield; the adjoining town of Musselburgh, and Wallyford beyond, are not within the council borders of Edinburgh, but are considered part of the Edinburgh settlement (urban area). Thus the local authority area cannot be described wholly as an urban environment, whilst parts of the urban area of Edinburgh lie outside the council area.

=== Settlements ===
Largest settlements by population
Settlement	Population (2020)
Edinburgh	506,520
South Queensferry	10,400
Kirkliston	5,280
Ratho	2,230
Newbridge	1,270

=== Languages ===
The 2022 Scottish Census reported that out of 501,271 residents aged three and over, 117,936 (23.5%) considered themselves able to speak or read the Scots language. This puts Edinburgh as the council area with the third lowest proficiency in Scots, mainly due to the large migrant population, not born in Scotland.

The 2022 Scottish Census reported that out of 501,266 residents aged three and over, 6,576 (1.3%) considered themselves able to speak or read Gaelic.

== Premises ==
Before 1368 the city was run from a pretorium (a Latin term for tolbooth), and later from around 1400 from the Old Tolbooth next to St Giles' Cathedral. A tolbooth is the main municipal building of a Scottish burgh providing council meeting chambers, a court house and a jail. The Old Tolbooth of Edinburgh was unique in that it housed both the Edinburgh Town Council and the Scottish Parliament. As a royal burgh the council was convened by a lord provost, who was assisted by a team of bailies.

The Tolbooth had fallen into a state of disrepair by the 1560s, and was cramped, housing both the expanding Town Council of Edinburgh, and the Parliament of Scotland. Queen Mary believed the situation was intolerable, and requested extensive renovations. By 1639 Edinburgh Town Council paid for a new building, called Parliament House, to be constructed nearby for the Parliament to meet in so they would no longer have to share the Old Tolbooth.

In 1753 Edinburgh Town Council commissioned the construction of a new Royal Exchange as a meeting place for the city merchants, intended to rival the Royal Exchange of London. However the merchants preferred to carry on meeting at the Mercat Cross. Given the conditions of the Old Tolbooth and the underused status of the Royal Exchange, the council moved into the north range of the Royal Exchange in 1811 while a new fit for purpose permanent presence could be planned, and the Old Tolbooth was demolished. The former location of the Old Tolbooth (fully demolished in 1817) is now marked by the Heart of Midlothian, a heart-shaped sett in the paving of Edinburgh's Royal Mile. The only remaining part of the Old Tolbooth is a door which Walter Scott recovered and added to his home Abbotsford.

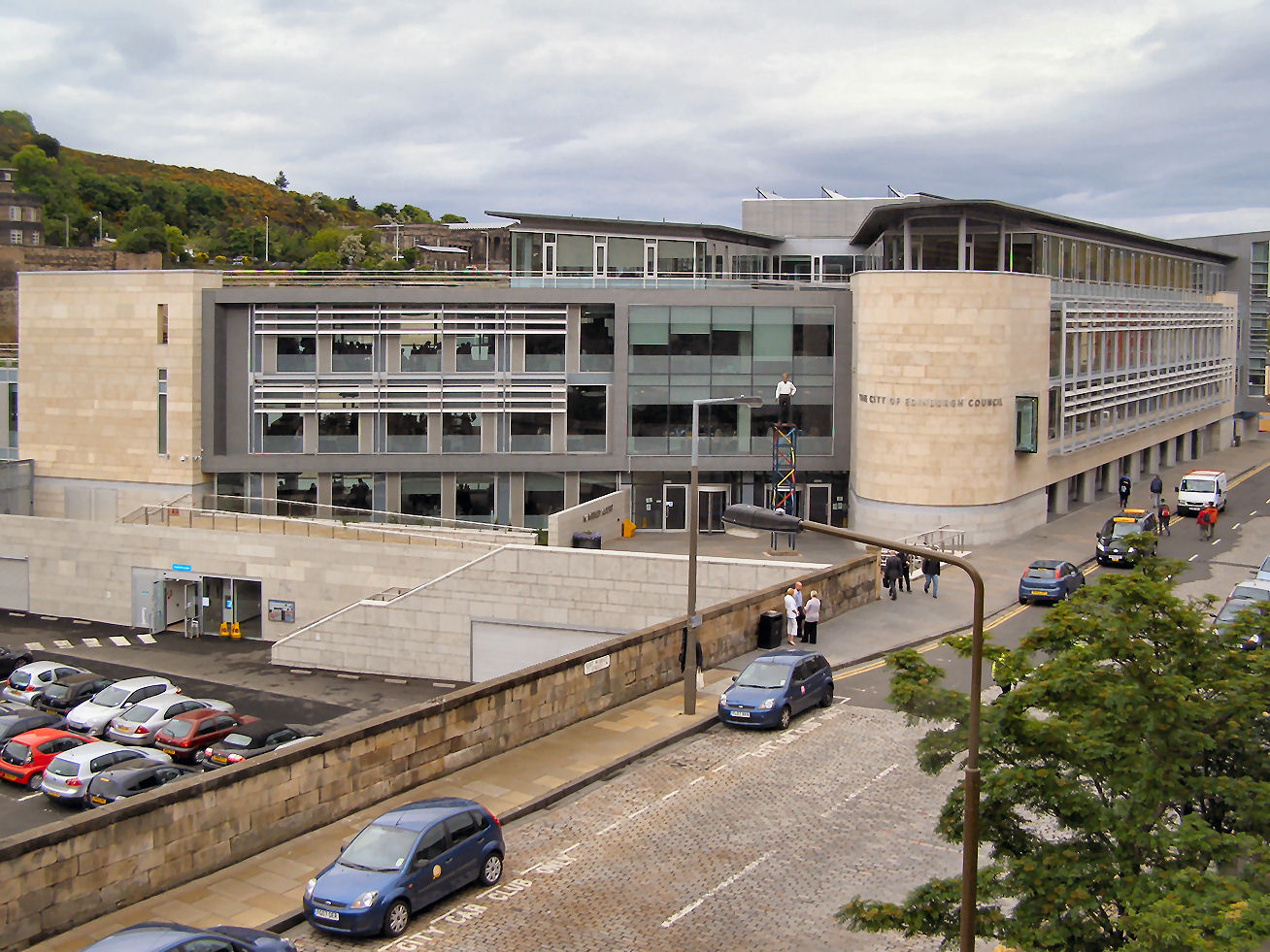
Waverley Court, 4 East Market Street: Council's administrative headquarters since 2007

After the Canongate burgh merged into the city of Edinburgh in 1856, and the Canongate Tolbooth was abandoned, the north range of the Royal Exchange became too crowded once again and in 1893 the council bought back the rest of the old Royal Exchange building and renamed it as the Edinburgh City Chambers. The City Chambers continues to be the council's meeting place and official headquarters. In 2006 the council built a new building called Waverley Court at 4 East Market Street to be the council's administrative offices.

City of Edinburgh Council (Portobello Park) Act 2014
- Act of the Scottish Parliament
- Scottish Parliament
- Long title: An Act of the Scottish Parliament to change the status of Portobello Park so as to permit the City of Edinburgh Council to appropriate it for the purposes of the Council's functions as an education authority; and for connected purposes.
- Citation: 2014 asp 15

Dates
- Royal assent: 1 August 2014

Text of statute as originally enacted

Text of the City of Edinburgh Council (Portobello Park) Act 2014 as in force today (including any amendments) within the United Kingdom, from legislation.gov.uk.

With the passage of the City of Edinburgh Council (Portobello Park) Act 2014 (asp 15), the council can appropriate Portobello Park for educational purposes.

== Controversies ==
The council has been at the centre of several corruption scandals in recent years, including allegations of possible fraud, wrong-doing and incompetence in the Property Conservation Department in the BBC Scotland documentary Scotland's Property Scandal in 2011; four men pleading guilty to corruption in the allocation of public building work contracts at the Council in 2015; and mis-spending of £400,000 of public money, and a subsequent bullying campaign against the whistleblower who brought this corruption to light in 2021.

== Wards ==
Map of the council's ward boundaries as of 2017.

Ward number	Ward name	Seats	Population (2019)
1	Almond	4	36,730
2	Pentland Hills	4	32,703
3	Drum Brae/Gyle	3	23,534
4	Forth	4	31,823
5	Inverleith	4	34,236
6	Corstorphine/Murrayfield	3	24,192
7	Sighthill/Gorgie	4	33,826
8	Colinton/Fairmilehead	3	25,257
9	Fountainbridge/Craiglockhart	3	23,715
10	Morningside	4	32,586
11	City Centre	4	32,410
12	Leith Walk	4	34,651
13	Leith	3	24,207
14	Craigentinny/Duddingston	4	29,927
15	Southside/Newington	4	37,696
16	Liberton/Gilmerton	4	35,480
17	Portobello/Craigmillar	4	31,957
	Total	63	524,930

== See also ==
- Politics of Edinburgh
- Coat of arms of Edinburgh
