= 1995 City of Edinburgh Council election =

Scottish municipal election

← 1992	6 April 1995	1999 →

All 58 seats to Edinburgh City Council 30 seats needed for a majority
	First party	Second party	Third party
Party	Labour	Conservative	Liberal Democrats
Last election	30	23	7
Seats won	34	14	10
Seat change	▲4	▼9	▲3
Popular vote	63,511	36,365	28,273
Percentage	40.7%	23.3%	18.1%
- Interactive map showing results in the 58 City of Edinburgh electoral wards.
Council control before election
No overall control
Council control after election
Labour

Elections for the City of Edinburgh Council took place on Thursday 6 April 1995, alongside elections to the various newly created unitary councils across Scotland.

Labour won 34 of the council's 58 seats, continuing their control of the council.

== Aggregate results ==
City of Edinburgh Council election, 1995
Party	Seats	Gains	Losses	Net gain/loss	Seats %	Votes %	Votes	+/−
Labour	34			▲4	58.6	40.7	63,511	
Conservative	14			▼9	24.1	23.3	36,365	
Liberal Democrats	10			▲3	17.2	18.1	28,273	
SNP	0			0	0.0	17.3	27,013	
Green	0			0	0.0	0.3	423	
Natural Law	0			0	0.0	0.3	394	
Independent	0			0	0.0	0.1	216	
