= Burgess of Edinburgh =

A Burgess of Edinburgh is an individual who has been granted a Burgess ticket in the City of Edinburgh, Scotland. Historically, to be a Burgess was to be a 'free man' or 'citizen' of the burgh, who could own land (known as a burgage), contribute to the running of the town and not be under the jurisdiction of any feudal lord.

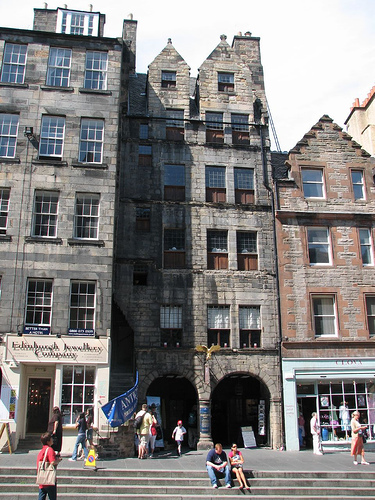
Glasdstone's Land, a surviving example of a Burgess' Town House in the Old Town of Edinburgh

With the transition of economic dominance from feudalism to the Mercantile economy in the medieval era, it also brought with it the right to join the Merchant Company or Incorporated Trades, which held exclusive right to trade or practice a craft within the city. With the eventual power of the Merchant Company and Incorporated Trades, it was therefore essentially impossible to conduct business in Edinburgh without having been granted a Burgess ticket. The Merchants' Company and Incorporated Trades also sat within the Town Council and so to be a Burgess was to also be able to partake in the politics of the city. The burgesses' exclusive trading rights were abolished in 1846, and the Merchants and Incorporated Trades were decoupled from the council in 1973.

Today, the burgess-ship of Edinburgh is still awarded but no longer carries many substantive rights and takes on a predominantly prestigious ceremonial function. The word "burgess" also lives on in Edinburgh institutions and place names, such as The Royal Burgess Golfing Society of Edinburgh or Burgess Road.

== Issuing of burgess ticket ==
From the late medieval era, Burgess tickets were issued by the Lord Dean of Guild (an ancient office within the City of Edinburgh). Burgesses qualified for admission by fulfilling the requirements to have residence in the town; being nominated by either an Incorporated Trade or the Merchant company, or be related by birth or marriage to an existing Burgess; and pay the required fees. After Burgess-ship was granted their name would be entered in the roll and they would consequently receive their Burgess ticket.

Occasionally when someone of note was made a Burgessm such as a Lord Provost of Edinburgh, the Burgess ticket would be presented in a box known as a 'Freedom Casket'. It would often be silver or gold, be lavishly decorated and bear an engraving of the recipient's name.

Local government reform in 1973 reformed the role of Lord Dean of Guild, and the office was transferred into the Merchant Company of Edinburgh. That created an issue where Burgess tickets could be issued by the City of Edinburgh Council or the Merchant Company but not the Incorporated Trades. The City of Edinburgh Council began to use only burgess-ship as a civic award and issued it only to individuals who had "distinguished themselves through their work or efforts, or to recognise the respect and high esteem in which they are held by the people of Edinburgh". This is sometimes known as "Honorary Burgess-ship". Thus, those seeking to join the Incorporated Trades would be left with no choice but to first approach the Merchant Company.

Edinburgh City Council arbitrated an agreement between the Merchants and the Incorporated Trades. Nominations for Burgess-ship are now accepted from either organisation, and a new body called the Burgess Association of Edinburgh was created to help oversee this. Applications are now adjudicated by a committee with representatives from both the Merchant Company and The Convenery of Trades and the City Council delegated the keeping of the Roll of Burgesses, and the authority to set and retain the civic dues associated with processing new Burgess Tickets, to the Association. It also required that the burgess tickets should be signed by The Lord Dean of Guild and Deacon Convener of the Trades, and the Lord Provost on behalf of the city Council.

== Burgess Association of Edinburgh ==
The Burgess Association, founded in 2017, with a constitution adopted on 30 October 2017. Arms were granted by the Lord Lyon and the motto of the organisation is 'Unitis Viribus' or 'With United Forces'.

== See also ==
- Convention of Royal Burghs
- Burgher (Church history)
