= High Constables of Edinburgh =

Now-ceremonial group of constables based in Edinburgh, Scotland

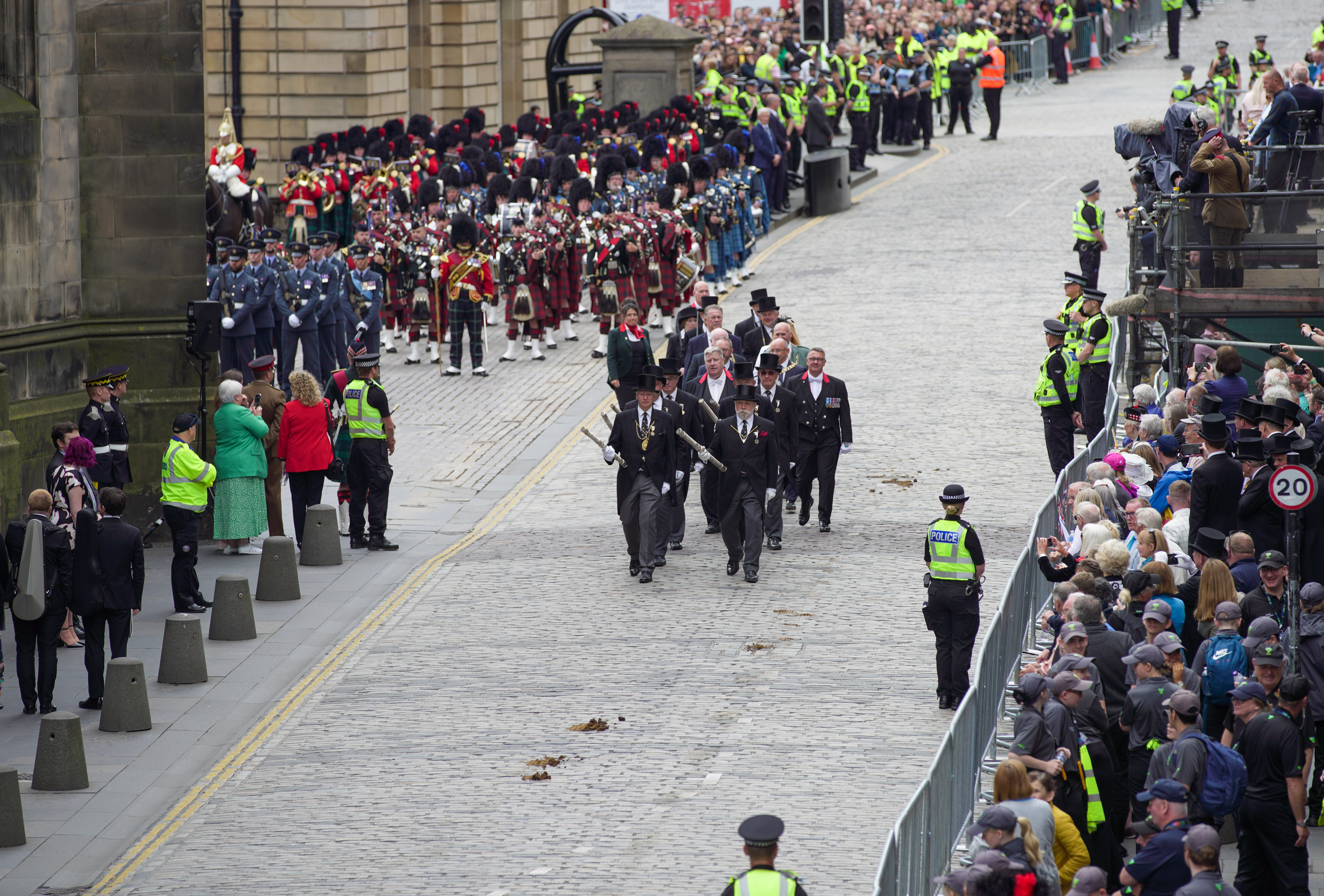
A detachment of High Constables of Edinburgh at the Presentation of the Honours of Scotland in 2023

The High Constables of Edinburgh are a prestigious body of constables, founded in 1611 and located in Edinburgh, Scotland. Historically, the High Constables were charged with policing the streets of Edinburgh, the capital city of Scotland, however today their duties are mostly ceremonial. It is believed that the High Constables of Edinburgh are the first example of a statutory police force in the world. At one time they formed part of the now defunct Corporation of the City of Edinburgh and continue to serve a ceremonial function in the local government of Edinburgh.

== History ==
=== Constables in Scotland ===
Within Scotland the Lord High Constable was an officer of the royal household since at least c.1114. The officeholder deputised for the King of Scotland on military matters, and held a court – the High Court of Constabulary – in which the office holder was empowered to judge all cases of rioting, disorder, bloodshed and murder if such crimes occurred within four miles of the King, the King's Council, or the Parliament of Scotland. Other constables were appointed with jurisdiction over various castles across the country. From the 16th century a small corps of constables, called the High Constables of the Palace of Holyroodhouse, were appointed at Holyrood Palace and Abbey to protect the monarch and their guests in residence at Holyrood, as well as to guard the palace and abbey, and enforce the justice of the Bailie of Holyrood within the precincts of the palace and the Holyrood Abbey Sanctuary.

However, the idea of a lower level English constable with jurisdiction over hundreds, villages and townships had not been introduced to Scotland. Due to the nature of the Scottish landscape, order was maintained by clan chiefs and feudal lords. Constables as town or village officials had provided a civil guard in areas of England since 1285, when King Edward I of England passed the Statute of Winchester, with provisions which "constituted two constables in every hundred to prevent defaults in towns and highways", and by the 1600s, within local areas, a constable could be attested by two or more justices of the peace.

=== The first statutory police force ===
After the union of the crowns in 1603 James VI of Scotland ascended to the throne of England. This resulted in a great cultural exchange, and the renewed fortunes of the City of Edinburgh as a trade centre with the Merchant Company of Edinburgh and the Incorporated Trades of Edinburgh. By 1611 with increased trade and the associated crime and occasional political disorder, the King's Privy Council saw it necessary to implement a corps of guards, thus the High Constables of Edinburgh were founded by an order of the privy council of 19 February 1611, which "command[ed] the magistrates of Edinburgh to appoint some persons to guard their streets and to commit to ward all person found on the streets after the said hour (ten hours bell). If in the taking of them any inconvenient sal happen it is declared that the same shall not be imputed as a crime to the captors but as good and acceptable service". Following many meetings of Edinburgh council, a number of constables were appointed – half were merchants and half were craftsmen, and were charged with enforcing 16 regulations, relating to curfews, weapons and thefts.

It is believed that the High Constables of Edinburgh are the first example of a statutory police force in the world. Uniforms would come later, and during the 17th century, the constables were issued with "short batons for their pockets", paid for from their fines.

=== Reassignment ===
Over time the role of the society of High Constables changed, and they were forced to meet the evolving demands of law and order, attending executions, fires and riots. As the High Constables were principally respected gentlemen of the city, both merchants and in professions, there was concern that the increased demands made of them were unreasonable. In light of this the Edinburgh Police Act 1805 (45 Geo. 3. c. xxi) introduced a new force designed to deal with the 'duties of watching over the peace of the metropolis'. In 1810 the constables were awarded the title of 'High Constables' to distinguish them from the other Edinburgh City Police. The High Constables instead took on ceremonial duties, providing a guard of honour at the Edinburgh council, and parading for royal visits.

== Traditions ==
The body retains traditions of fining members for non attendance without a valid excuse and of inspecting the batons at the election of new constables.

The uniform of the High Constables is that of morning dress, a black top hat, pinstripe grey trousers and a black morning coat and bears similarities to the uniform of the Cambridge University Constabulary in England. On non-ceremonial occasions High Constables may wear a lounge suit and bowler hat. The leader of the society of High Constables, known as the Moderator, wears a gold chain. Other officers also wear chains. The Treasurer carries a brass money box which was made in 1698. There are also large silver mounted batons for the use of Office Bearers

== Present day ==
Today, the society serves as the official bodyguard to the Lord Provost, and continues to provide ceremonial guards at significant Edinburgh occasions. These include the Kirking of the Deacons and Riding of the Marches, the Royal Edinburgh Military Tattoo where they lead the Lord Provost's Platoon and the Edinburgh Hogmanay Celebrations. The constitution of the Society was modified in 1997 when the members agreed by a two thirds majority to permit women to become members. This was done at the request of the City of Edinburgh Council. The first lady member was elected in October of the following year. In 2019 Jacqueline Easson became the first lady Moderator after being elected the first lady Vice Moderator the previous year.
