= Josiah Livingston (merchant) =

Scottish merchant (1818–1896)

Josiah Livingston FRSE (1818–1896) was a Scottish merchant who twice served as President of the Edinburgh Chamber of Commerce. He was co-founder of the Edinburgh Literary Institute. He was partner in the Edinburgh company of Livingston & Weir.

== Life ==
He was born at Roxburgh Place around 1818, the son of Josiah Livingston of Whitehead & Livingston, wine merchants. It is thought his mother, Euphans Murray, died at or soon after, his birth. In early life the family lived at 26 Buccleuch Place. He was educated at the Southern Academy at 1 Buccleuch Place.

In 1873 he founded the Edinburgh Literary Institute in 1873 and served as Chairman until death. In 1881 he became Master of the Merchant Company of Edinburgh. In 1882 he was elected a Fellow of the Royal Society of Edinburgh. His proposers were Sir Thomas Jamieson Boyd, Sir James Falshaw, James Sime[] and Sir John Murray. He served twice as President of the Edinburgh Chamber of Commerce: 1869 to 1872 and 1879 to 1880.

In later life he lived at 4 Minto Street in south Edinburgh. He died on 13 January 1896.

== Publications ==
- Our Street: Memories of Buccleuch Place (1893)
- The New North Church, Edinburgh (1893) note, this is now the Bedlam Theatre

== Artistic recognition ==
His portrait by Norman Macbeth hangs in the Edinburgh Chamber of Commerce.
