= Incorporated Trades of Edinburgh =

Trade and craft bodies of the City of Edinburgh, Scotland

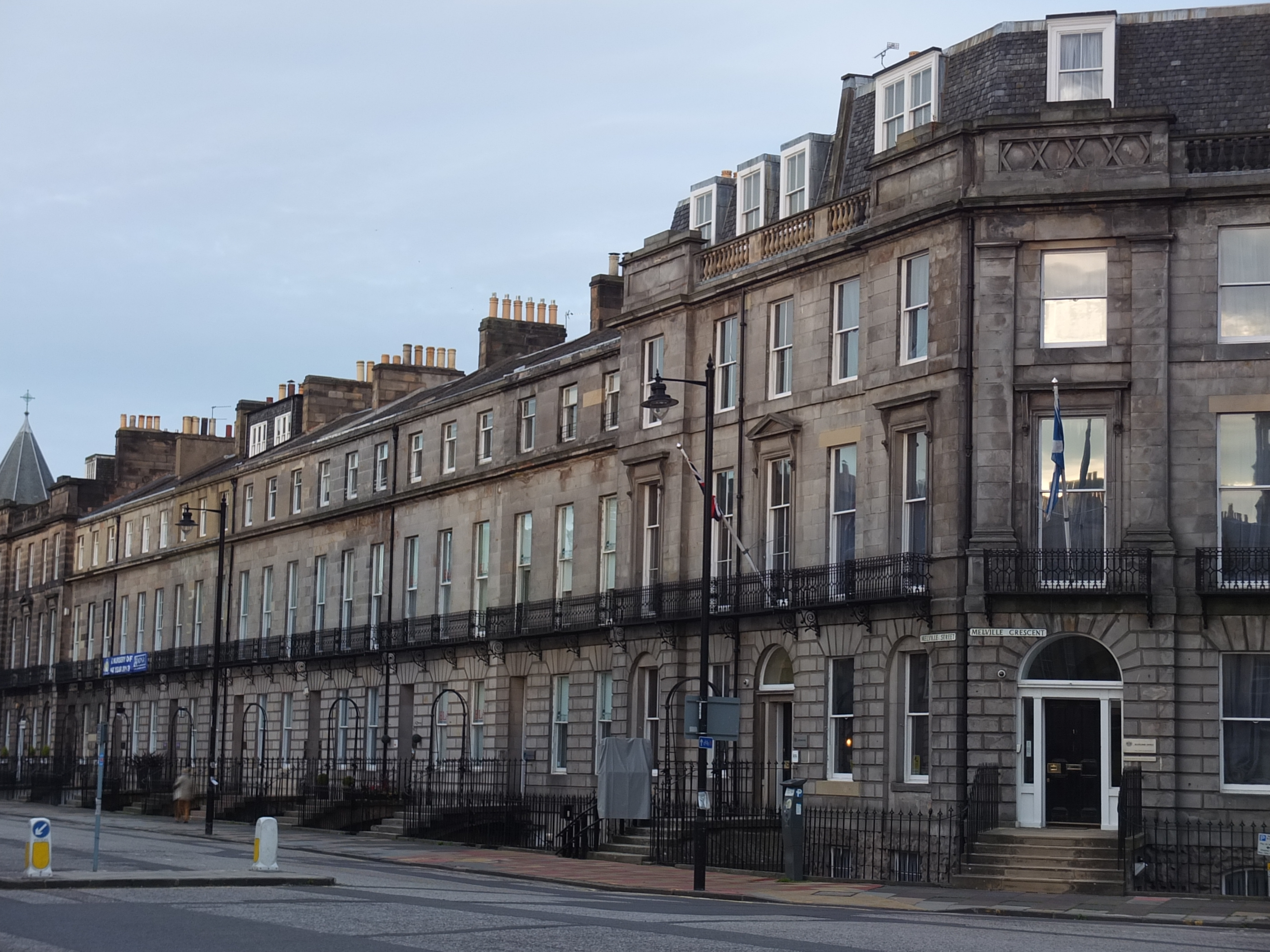
Melville Street looking down towards Ashfield (far left), home of The Convenery of the Trades of Edinburgh

The Incorporated Trades of Edinburgh are the trade and craft bodies of the City of Edinburgh, Scotland, in much the same way as the livery companies are in The City of London, but on a much smaller scale. The incorporations are not "guilds", that term being properly reserved in Scotland for the merchant bodies in the various burghs. The incorporations have never referred to themselves as guilds; indeed they came into existence, mostly in the latter part of the fifteenth century, in order to counter the growing power of the merchant guild, known as the Royal Company of Merchants of the City of Edinburgh.

By 1562 the Incorporations formed what became known as the Convenery of Trades of Edinburgh, an umbrella body that still exists and which looks after the interests of all the Incorporated Trades of the burgh. The Convenery consists, in the narrow sense of the word, of the Deacons of each of the Incorporations, plus the two Trades Councillors. In the broad sense of the word, however, the term "Convenery of Trades" embraces all the Freemen of all the Incorporated Trades of the Burgh, together with their journeymen and apprentices, in a convivial fellowship of mutual support.

It became a requirement to be a burgess of the burgh before one could be admitted as a freeman of an incorporation. Once an applicant had submitted his essay and been accepted as a Freeman, he was expected to set up his own business and to employ journeymen and train apprentices. The incorporations were able to prevent any outsiders from practising their trade in the burgh until they had paid their dues to the appropriate incorporated trade. Along with the Royal Company of Merchants it forms part the Burgess Association of Edinburgh, an umbrella organisation for the trade bodies of the City of Edinburgh, who are discharged to propose individuals to the Edinburgh Lord Dean of Guild and Deacon Convener of the Trades to be made a Burgess of Edinburgh.

Although no longer forming an official part of the City of Edinburgh Council, the Convenery of Trades maintains links and participates in a number of ceremonial events across Edinburgh.

== Origins and background ==
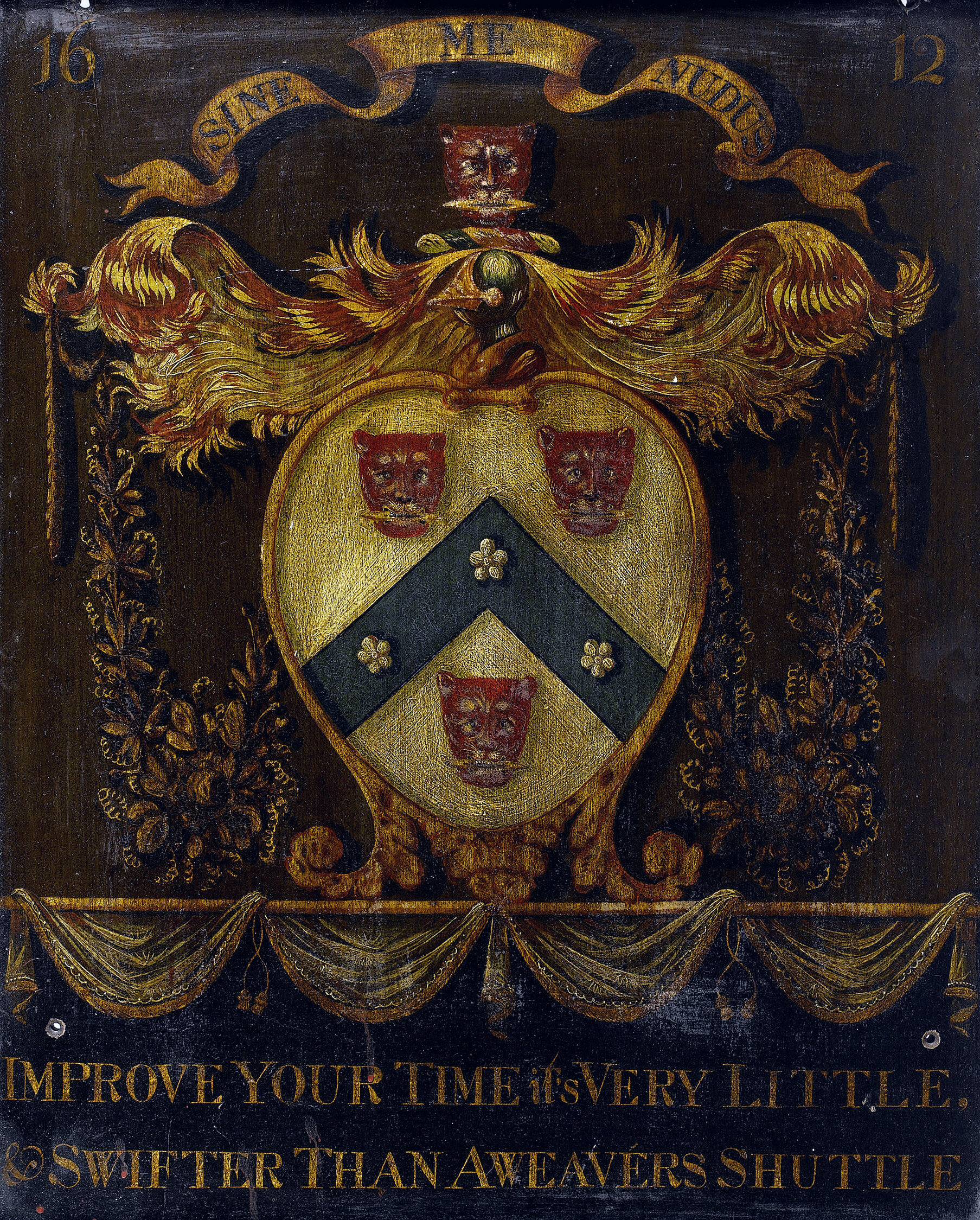
Arms of the Edinburgh Incorporation of Weavers

The Incorporated Trades of Edinburgh historically held the power to regulate their various trades in the town. There are fifteen incorporations in Edinburgh, fourteen of which had Deacons who were permanent members of the Convenery of Trades from its beginning. Unlike the worshipful companies of London which are given precedence based on their date of founding, the trades are given precedence by the Act of Sett of the Burgh of Edinburgh, in a "decreet arbitral" by King James VI in 1583. The cited reason for this was that many of the trades "no longer possessed their original seals of cause and did not know the year in which they had been founded".

In 1583 the Act of Sett of the Burgh laid down that six of the Deacons, known as the Council Deacons, should sit as full Council members at all meetings of the council, and the remaining eight Deacons, known as Extraordinary Deacons, were to sit with the Council only when certain topics of business were being discussed and to take full part in the annual elections of Councillors and office-bearers. Until 1833 the Deacons of the fourteen Incorporated Trades sat with the Town Council in their deliberations.

Local government reform in 1973 removed the Incorporated Trades' formal role within the City of Edinburgh council.

== The Convenery of the Trades of Edinburgh ==
The Convenery of the Trades of Edinburgh consists of the elected heads (known as Deacons) of all the incorporated trades and today acts as the ruling body of the Incorporated Trades. Its present-day main focus is the various charities and events operated by the Incorporated Trades. They also assist the various Incorporated Trades wherever they can. The Convenery is headed by the Deacon-Convener of the Trades of Edinburgh, who holds the distinction of being the first tradesman in Scotland, and third citizen of Edinburgh after the Lord Provost and the Lord Dean of Guild. From 1598 until 1858 the Convenery of Trades met in The Magdalen Chapel in Cowgate. Today it meets at its own headquarters, known as Ashfield, 61 Melville Street, which also contains a dedicated museum.

== Entry ==
In order to become a freeman of any of the trades one used to have to become a burgess of the City of Edinburgh first. The grant of burgesship was historically the gift of the Lord Dean of Guild, an office in the Council of the City of Edinburgh, after an incorporation or the Merchant Company proposed someone. However, local government reform in 1973 changed this precedent and the office of Lord Dean of Guild was transferred instead to the Merchant Company of Edinburgh. Though the City of Edinburgh council also retained the power to propose burgess-ship, the council only proposed it as an honorary award to those who "have distinguished themselves through their work or efforts, or to recognise the respect and high esteem in which they are held by the people of Edinburgh". This became known as honorary burgess-ship. This caused an issue for the Incorporated Trades, as it meant prospective Freemen first had to approach the Merchant Company of Edinburgh to get their burgess ticket, before they could join their trade.

Edinburgh City Council arbitrated an agreement between the Merchants and the craftsmen, and now nominations for burgess-ship are accepted from either organisation, adjudicated by a committee with representatives from both the Merchant Company and the Convenery of Trades and chaired by the Lord Dean of Guild. In 2017 a new body was created, called the Burgess Association of Edinburgh, to include all the burgesses of the city to help with this, and to further foster friendship and co-operation between the Merchant Company and the Convenery of Trades. The City of Edinburgh Council delegated the keeping of the Roll of Burgesses and the authority to set and retain the civic dues associated with processing new burgess tickets for the association. It also required that the burgess tickets should be signed by the Lord Dean of Guild and Deacon Convener of the Trades and the Lord Provost on behalf of the city council.

== Governance ==
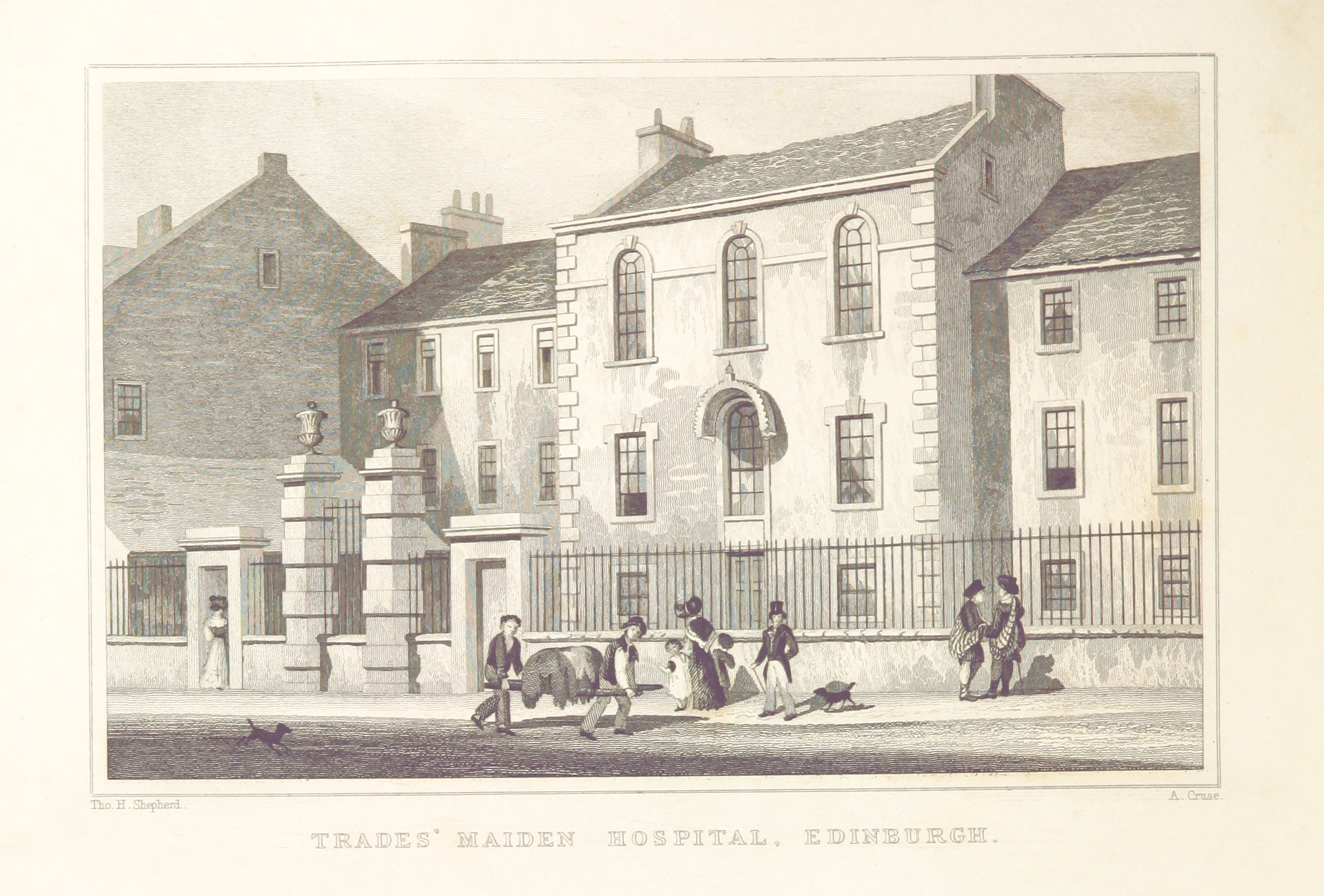
Edinburgh Trades' Maiden Hospital

=== Deacons ===
Each trade elects a deacon – an office dating back to an act of Parliament in 1424. Their role was originally one of quality control. To ensure the products of their respective trade matched up to the standards expected of the craft. The role of Deacon often later became combined with the role of that of 'Kirkmaster' or 'Boxmaster' (treasurer). The privilege of the deacons sitting on the town council was rescinded following the passage of the Royal Burghs (Scotland) Act 1833 (3 & 4 Will. 4. c. 76). The deacons undertook other work, for example the Deacon of the Goldsmiths was also the Assay-Master at the Edinburgh Assay Office until 1681 (an organisation that they still operate to this day). Over time they took on roles as trustees of various charities. They were also the Governors of the Edinburgh Trades Maiden Hospital, founded by the Craftsmen of Edinburgh and Mary Erskine (1629–1707). This charity still exists but its name was changed in 2015 to the Edinburgh Trades Fund. Perhaps the most infamous deacon is Deacon Brodie, Deacon of the Incorporation of Wrights, who used his knowledge gained by installing cabinets in Edinburgh to become a housebreaker and thief. According to legend, Brodie is said to have been the craftsman who built the gallows on which he would later be hanged.

=== Boxmaster ===
One of the most important items of the incorporation would have been the trades' boxes in which their funds were kept. The boxes would be decorated with emblems or engravings of the incorporation. For security the boxes would often be held by someone who didn't have a key. Over time boxmaster became an alternative name for a treasurer.

== Historic roles ==
The main function of the Incorporated Trades was to act as a trade association and governing body for the master craftsmen to maintain their standards within their respective trades in the city. This meant some degree of ensuring conformity to things like common regulations they established for their industry locally. One could not practice a trade without being under the stewardship of their respective Incorporation, so the Incorporated Trades also acted to facilitate apprentices and journeymen with training in their various crafts.

Over time the function of the Incorporated Trades became more important, and eventually they held positions within the structure of the town council itself – at various times finding representation in the Common Council of the Burgh, and having the Deacon Convener sit as one of the magistrates of the city. These councillors were elected from within the trades by popular election – the councillors sent by the Merchant Company on the other hand were appointed on the principle of 'self election'.

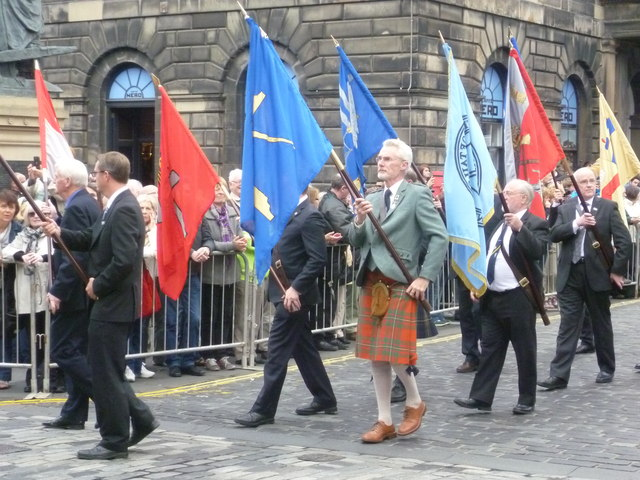
Flags of the Incorporated Trades

As the Trades became more powerful, more powerful men began to seek out membership. The Trades encouraged this as an opportunity to further expand their influence, and often courted more powerful men themselves. Historically the trades had been primarily made up of those within the burgess class – as one needed a burgess ticket to join a Trade. However, over time, even some members of higher social classes sought out membership, usually as amateur tradesmen. For example, on 21 March 1657, the lawyer Mr Charles Smith Advocate (son of Sir John Smith of Grattle, former Lord Provost of Edinburgh), was admitted as a blacksmith to the Hammermen, for submitting as his essay "the portrait of a horse's leg, shoed with a silver shoe, fixed with three nails, with a silver stable at the other end thereof; which was found to be a qualified and well-wrought essay". Another example includes Sir George Mackenzie of Rosehaugh, who was entered into the Hammermen in 1697, at a meeting attended by Sir James Dalrymple of Stair Lord President of the Court of Session, Robert Dundas, Lord Arniston, and other "persons of quality". The Duke of Cumberland was admitted to the Hammermen in 1746.

The Incorporations also came to provide a forum for expanding commercial networks and socialising. The Incorporation of Mary's Chapel was the name of the Incorporation of Masons, as they met at Mary's Chapel on Niddrie's Wynd. In 1491 the authorities of Edinburgh issued the Masons the right 'to gett a recreation in the commoun luge'. This shows the use of their meeting place was permitted for more than just training new stonemasons and undertaking governance and administration. The 'luge' refers to the 'lodge' - the name for when masons meet together. Just as the Hammermen had admitted 'amateur' members to their Incorporation, in 1634 the Mary's Chapel Lodge of Edinburgh admitted Sir Anthony Alexander, the Master of Work to the Crown of Scotland. Anthony was not an operative stonemason, and thus this has been suggested as the foundation of "speculative" Masonry later known as Freemasonry (possibly because the masons themselves had to be burgesses of Edinburgh, and therefore 'free' from bondage unlike English masons). Due to the admission of Sir Alex, and minutes dating back to 1599, the Lodge of Edinburgh (Mary's Chapel) claims to be the oldest Freemasonic Lodge in the world. Other similar fraternal bodies formed from other trades elsewhere in Scotland, such as the Miller's Word, Order of Free Gardeners and The Horseman's Word.

== Present-day activities ==
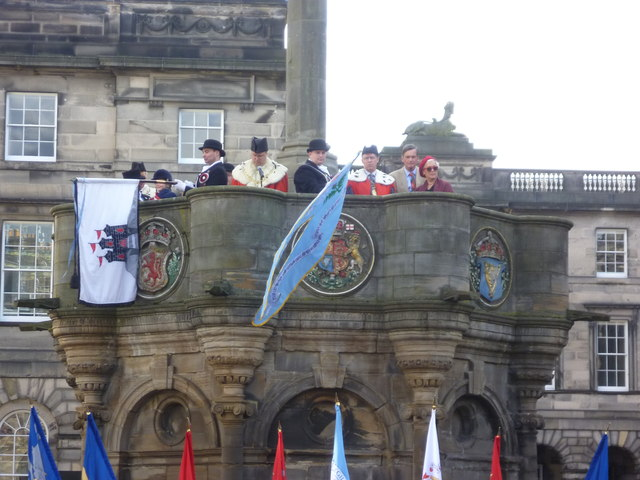
The Blue Banner lowered in remembrance of the Battle of Flodden from the Mercat Cross as part of the Edinburgh Riding of the Marches event.

Many of the trades have taken on a more charitable focus, and some even accept freemen who have not received a burgess ticket.

The Incorporation of Surgeons is now the Royal College of Surgeons of Edinburgh and operates as one of the four surgical colleges in the United Kingdom and Ireland, the others being the Royal College of Surgeons of England, the Royal College of Physicians and Surgeons of Glasgow, and the Royal College of Surgeons in Ireland. The Incorporation held the unusual privilege of being the only body with a monopoly on the distilling of alcohol ("aquavite") in the burgh.

The Incorporation of Goldsmiths owns and operates the Edinburgh Assay Office. Today its Freemen include jewellers, gold and silver smiths, bankers and financiers. Historically, many of its membership helped form the Bank of Scotland in 1695. It retains the statutory role of assaying and hallmarking gold, silver, platinum and palladium wares before they can be sold.

=== The Kirking of the Deacons ===
Every year the deacons are "kirked" at Beltane, in a ceremony, known as the Kirking of the Deacons, in which the Deacons march in ceremonial dress along with their banner-bearers, led by the Convenery's Officer bearing the Blue Blanket, under escort from the High Constables of Edinburgh, from Candlemakers' Hall to Greyfriars Kirk. They are met by the Lord Provost and some of the Council where a ceremony is conducted by the Convenery's Chaplain. Psalms and hymns are sung and Clement Cor's Prayer, the traditional dedicatory prayer of the Convenery, is said. This is followed by a procession from the church to the grave of Mary Erskine, with whom the Incorporated Trades founded the Trades Maiden Hospital 1704. Before the local council reform of 1973, this ceremony was undertaken by the entirety of Edinburgh Council, where they would be "reminded of their duties and responsibilities and were charged with the responsibility of doing their civic duty impartially and to the best of their ability."

=== The Riding of the Marches ===
The Riding of the Marches is a modern revival of a tradition that stopped in the early 1700s. It is an annual event held in Edinburgh to commemorate the return in the year 1513 of the Captain of the City Band, Randolph Murray clasping the Ancient 'Blue Blanket Banner' (the banner of the Edinburgh tradesmen, said to have been awarded to the craftsmen of Edinburgh by James III in 1482) with news of the defeat of the Scottish Army at the Battle of Flodden.

== Precedence ==
The order of precedence among the incorporations is determined not by their age, but by the Act of Sett of the Burgh of Edinburgh, agreed by King James VI in a decreet arbitral in 1583. The precedence is as follows:

1. The Incorporation and Royal College of Surgeons
2. The Incorporation of Goldsmiths
3. The Incorporation of Skinners
4. The Incorporation of Furriers
5. The Incorporation of Hammermen
6. The Incorporation of Wrights
7. The Incorporation of Masons
8. The Incorporation of Tailors
9. The Incorporation of Baxters
10. The Incorporation of Fleshers
11. The Incorporation of Cordiners
12. The Incorporation of Weavers
13. The Incorporation of Waulkers
14. The Incorporation of Bonnetmakers & Dyers
15. The Incorporation of Candlemakers

== The Inferior Trades or Crafts ==
In addition to the corporations there were other crafts, whose members associated together as a company. For whatever reason these crafts never obtained a seal of cause and were eventually subsumed into one of the incorporated trades.

The Armourers - United into the Hammermen
The Belt Makers - United into the Hammermen via its association with the Loriners
The Bowyers - Annexed into the Masons
The Blacksmiths - One of the seventeen crafts of which the Hammermen was constituted
The Braziers - United into the Hammermen via its association with the Loriners
The Coopers - United into the Masons via its association with the Wrights
The Coppersmiths - Originally part of the Loriners and thus united into the Hammermen
The Cutlers - United into the Hammermen
The Founders - United into the Hammermen via its association with the Loriners
The Glaziers - United into the Masons
The Gunsmiths - United into the Locksmiths who in turn were united into the Hammermen
The Hatmakers - By way of a charter issued by the Town Council associated with the Waulkers.
The Listers or Dyers - By way of a charter issued by the Town Council united with the Bonnet Makers.
The Locksmiths - Formed part of the Hammermen
The Loriners - Became part of the Hammermen
The Painters - Became united with the Wrights who would unite into the Masons
The Pewterers - Constituted part of the Hammermen
The Pin Makers - United into the Locksmiths, who in turn united into the Hammermen
The Plumbers - United into the Masons
The Saddlers - Became part of the Hammermen
The Sievewrights - Became part of the Masons via its association with the Wrights
The Shearsmiths - Formed part of the Hammermen
The Slaters - Formed part of the Masons via the Wrights
The Upholsterers - Formed part of the Masons
The Watchmakers - United with the Locksmiths to become part of the Hammermen
The Tinsmiths (White Iron Smiths) - United with the Hammermen via its association with the Pewterers

The Society of Barbers were associated from an early date with the surgeons of the town, and the two were united in a single "Incorporation of Surgeons and Barbers" in 1505. However, by 1722 the two occupations had become increasingly separate. The surgeons no longer considered themselves to be a craft, but a profession. However the barbers did not have to pass the same medical examinations and therefore did not share the skills or qualifications. In 1722 the barbers were authorised by Edinburgh Town Council to form a separate Society and to elect a Preses, but they were not permitted to form an Incorporation with their own deacon. The society was wound up in 1926.

== Convening halls ==
The incorporations owned halls and rooms across the burgh which provided the members somewhere to convene to vote and carry out the administration of the incorporation.

Incorporation	Image of hall	Hall
Incorporation and Royal College of Surgeons	Surgeons' Hall	Surgeons' Hall - located in the South Side, designed by William Henry Playfair and completed in 1832. Old Surgeons' Hall built in 1697 is located in Surgeons' Square in the Old Town
Incorporation of Goldsmiths	Goldsmiths Hall	Goldsmiths Hall - Located on Broughton Street. It is a former church, built in 1816, which was fully refurbished and opened as the assay office in 1999 by Princess Anne.
Incorporation of Skinners	Skinners Hall	Skinners Hall - located on New Skinner's Close, a three-storey and attic, former L-plan hall dating from 1643. The hall is now in private ownership having been converted to flats in the 1980s.
Incorporation of Furriers		Shared the use of the Skinners Hall with the Incorporation of Skinners.
Incorporation of Hammermen	Magdalen Chapel	Magdalen Chapel - located in the Old Town, built between 1541 and 1544. Owned by the Hammermen until 1858.
Incorporation of Wrights		Shared St Mary's Chapel on Niddrie's Wynd with the Incorporation of Masons.
Incorporation of Masons	Mary's Chapel, Edinburgh	St Mary's Chapel on Niddrie's Wynd, demolished to make way for Edinburgh's South Bridge, which was completed in 1788. After this date the Masons moved to a new hall called Mary's Chapel on Burnet's Close. This building was later let for religious worship.
Incorporation of Tailors	Tailors' Hall	Tailor's Hall - located in the Cowgate. The building was finished in 1621. In 1801, the Argyle Brewery acquired the whole of the Tailors' property in the Cowgate with the exception of one building, alongside the Hall, which the Incorporation reserved to itself. It is now in use as a hotel.
Incorporation of Baxters	Baxters Tolbooth	The old Tolbooth in Dean Village, originally built as a Granary in 1675. It would be sold and altered in 1900 by Robert Lorimer to become the Cathedral Mission for St. Mary's Episcopal Cathedral.
Incorporation of Candlemakers	Candlemakers Hall	Candlemakers Hall - built in 1722 on Candlemakers Row by Greyfriars.

== See also ==
- Merchant Company of Edinburgh
- City of Edinburgh Council
- Livery company
