= 2003 City of Edinburgh Council election =

2003 Scottish local government election

- 1 May 2003

All 58 seats to Edinburgh City Council 30 seats needed for a majority
	First party	Second party	Third party
Party	Labour	Liberal Democrats	Conservative
Last election	31	14	12
Seats won	30	15	13
Seat change	▼1	▲1	▲1
Popular vote	48,826	48,002	44,001
Percentage	27.4%	26.9%	24.7%
Swing	▼5.1%	▲2.5%	▲2.5%
- Map of council wards
Council control before election
Labour
Council control after election
No overall control

Elections to the City of Edinburgh Council were held on 1 May 2003, the same day as the other Scottish local government elections and the Scottish Parliament general election.

== Election results ==
2003 City of Edinburgh Council election
Party	Seats	Gains	Losses	Net gain/loss	Seats %	Votes %	Votes	+/−
Labour	30	1	2	▼1	51.7	27.4	48,826	▼5.1
Liberal Democrats	15	1	0	▲1	25.9	26.9	48,002	▲2.5
Conservative	13	1	0	▲1	22.4	24.7	44,001	▲2.5
SNP	0	0	1	▼1	0.0	15.6	27,737	▼4.9
Scottish Socialist	0	0	0	0	0.0	4.1	7,280	New
Independent	0	0	0	0	0.0	1.2	2,090	▲1.1
Liberal	0	0	0	0	0.0	0.2	365	New
Socialist Labour	0	0	0	0	0.0	0.02	32	New

== Results by Ward (A-Z) ==
An asterisk (*) indicates an incumbent candidate.

Two asterisks (**) indicates an incumbent candidate standing for re-election in a different ward.

Alnwickhill
Party	Candidate	Votes	%	±%
Labour	Ian Murray	1,213	34.7	−7.4
Liberal Democrats	Elizabeth O'Malley	947	27.1	+13.5
Conservative	Denise Scott	605	17.3	−4.4
SNP	Kenneth Peacock	534	15.3	−7.3
Scottish Socialist	Colin Fox	194	5.6	N/A
Majority		266	7.6	−11.8
Turnout		3493	55.7	−12.0
Labour hold		Swing		

Baberton
Party	Candidate	Votes	%	±%
Conservative	Alastair Paisley*	2,144	55.1	+12.8
Labour	Benny Placido	788	20.2	−6.4
SNP	Alexander Thomson	548	14.1	−3.7
Liberal Democrats	Rod Scott	413	10.6	−2.6
Majority		1356	34.9	+19.2
Turnout		3893	63.7	−10.3
Conservative hold		Swing		

Balerno
Party	Candidate	Votes	%	±%
Conservative	Allan Laing	1,954	50.7	−7.8
Liberal Democrats	Michael Crockart	932	24.2	+13.7
Labour	Nicolette Fraser	547	14.2	−3.6
SNP	Robert Melville	422	10.9	−2.4
Majority		1022	26.5	−14.2
Turnout		3855	62.3	−10.4
Conservative hold		Swing		

Broughton
Party	Candidate	Votes	%	±%
Labour	Trevor Davies	1,097	34.0	−12.3
Liberal Democrats	Paul McGreal	544	16.9	−2.4
Conservative	Ian McGill	490	15.2	+2.6
SNP	Alisa Sheldrake	469	14.5	−7.3
Scottish Socialist	Sofiah MacLeod	343	10.6	N/A
Independent	Hamid Vafaie	200	6.2	N/A
Liberal	Seamus Macmhicean	85	2.6	N/A
Majority		553	17.1	−7.4
Turnout		3228	48.8	−9.6
Labour hold		Swing		

Calton
Party	Candidate	Votes	%	±%
Labour	Douglas Kerr*	924	34.0	−10.8
Liberal Democrats	David Lang	495	18.2	+2.3
SNP	Robin MacCormick	470	17.3	−11.0
Scottish Socialist	Linda Somerville	445	16.4	N/A
Conservative	William MacNair	296	10.9	−0.1
Liberal	Karen Hetherington	88	3.2	N/A
Majority		429	15.8	−0.8
Turnout		2718	40.7	−11.5
Labour hold		Swing		

Colinton
Party	Candidate	Votes	%	±%
Conservative	Brian Meek*	2,733	62.7	+7.0
Labour	James Ashe	680	15.6	−4.3
Liberal Democrats	Martin Oliver	516	11.8	−0.6
SNP	Bruce Wishart	432	9.9	−2.1
Majority		2053	47.1	+11.2
Turnout		4361	66.4	−5.8
Conservative hold		Swing		

Craigleith
Party	Candidate	Votes	%	±%
Conservative	Iain Whyte*	1,699	48.8	+10.4
Liberal Democrats	Adam Dzierzek	784	22.5	−9.3
Labour	Cameron Day	395	11.3	−6.1
Independent	Kristina Woolnough	367	10.5	N/A
SNP	Brian Rattray	237	6.8	−5.7
Majority		915	26.3	+19.7
Turnout		3482	60.8	−10.7
Conservative hold		Swing		

Craiglockhart
Party	Candidate	Votes	%	±%
Conservative	George Hunter*	2,637	68.8	+8.5
Labour	Margaret Mitchell	443	11.6	−6.6
Liberal Democrats	Angela Tunstall	413	10.8	−0.2
SNP	John Glen	260	6.8	−3.7
Scottish Socialist	Colin Wilson	80	2.1	N/A
Majority		2126	57.2	+15.1
Turnout		3833	66.4	−7.5
Conservative hold		Swing		

Craigmillar
Party	Candidate	Votes	%	±%
Labour	John O'Donnell*	774	41.1	−4.7
SNP	Andrew Gilhooly	689	36.6	−1.6
Scottish Socialist	Angela Lamb	146	7.8	N/A
Independent	Andrew McDonald	128	6.8	N/A
Liberal Democrats	Michael Scanlan	66	3.5	−2.3
Conservative	Elaine Burt	53	2.8	−2.0
Liberal	Andrew Dick	27	1.4	N/A
Majority		85	4.5	−3.2
Turnout		1883	33.7	−8.6
Labour hold		Swing		

Cramond
Party	Candidate	Votes	%	±%
Conservative	Kathleen MacKenzie*	1,956	52.6	+11.3
Liberal Democrats	Neil Maclean	1369	36.8	−3.5
SNP	David Purves	216	5.8	−2.3
Labour	John Stephen	176	4.7	−5.7
Majority		587	15.8	+14.8
Turnout		3717	59.9	−12.8
Conservative hold		Swing		

Dalmeny/Kirkliston
Party	Candidate	Votes	%	±%
Liberal Democrats	John Longstaff*	1,329	48.0	+15.3
SNP	Sheena Cleland	496	17.9	−5.6
Labour	Roberta Miller	475	17.2	−10.7
Conservative	David MacKenzie	431	15.6	−0.3
Liberal	Roy Isserlis	38	1.4	N/A
Majority		833	30.1	+25.3
Turnout		2769	47.2	−15.6
Liberal Democrats hold		Swing		

Dalry
Party	Candidate	Votes	%	±%
Labour	Kingsley Thomas*	784	33.1	−10.3
Liberal Democrats	Jacqueline Kelly	588	24.9	+7.0
SNP	Paul Smith	457	19.3	−10.9
Scottish Socialist	Kevin Leetion	302	12.8	N/A
Conservative	John Moodie	235	9.9	+1.4
Majority		196	8.2	−5.0
Turnout		2366	37.4	−13.5
Labour hold		Swing		

Davidson's Mains
Party	Candidate	Votes	%	±%
Liberal Democrats	James Lowrie*	1,970	49.9	+6.7
Conservative	Jeremy Balfour	1440	36.4	+0.1
Labour	Ann Hunter	283	7.2	−3.9
SNP	Ian Grant	258	6.5	−2.9
Majority		530	13.5	+6.6
Turnout		3951	64.4	−12.4
Liberal Democrats hold		Swing		

Dean
Party	Candidate	Votes	%	±%
Liberal Democrats	Thomas Ponton*	1,096	35.1	+13.7
Conservative	William Stevenson	933	29.9	−11.1
Labour	Lezley Cameron	494	15.8	−9.4
Independent	David Coutts	373	12.0	N/A
SNP	Ian Greenshields	225	7.2	−5.2
Majority		163	5.2	−10.7
Turnout		3121	49.1	−14.1
Liberal Democrats gain from Conservative		Swing		

Councillor Ponton was elected for the Conservatives in 1999, but sought re-election for the Liberal Democrats. He ultimately won re-election.

Duddingston
Party	Candidate	Votes	%	±%
Conservative	Ian Berry*	1,890	56.3	+4.5
Labour	Michael Robb	766	22.8	−2.7
SNP	John Torrance	418	12.5	−3.0
Liberal Democrats	Gary Peacock	282	8.4	+1.3
Majority		1124	33.5	+7.1
Turnout		3356	52.0	−12.0
Conservative hold		Swing		

East Craigs
Party	Candidate	Votes	%	±%
Liberal Democrats	Robert Aldridge*	1,763	54.5	+5.4
Labour	David Campbell	615	19.0	−2.1
Conservative	Christopher Harkness	400	12.4	+0.6
SNP	Thomas McKnight	358	11.1	−4.9
Scottish Socialist	Cyril Joyce	98	3.0	N/A
Majority		1148	35.5	+7.5
Turnout		3234	50.8	−13.6
Liberal Democrats hold		Swing		

Fairmilehead
Party	Candidate	Votes	%	±%
Conservative	Elaine Aitken	2,806	63.1	+4.2
Labour	Richard Gardner	721	16.2	−1.7
Liberal Democrats	Leslie Nicolson	568	12.8	+−0.0
SNP	Michael Gibson	353	7.9	−2.5
Majority		2085	46.9	+5.8
Turnout		4448	68.7	+7.0
Conservative hold		Swing		

Firrhill
Party	Candidate	Votes	%	±%
Labour	Andrew Scobbie	1,538	49.8	+0.6
SNP	Alexander Dredge	600	19.4	−5.6
Conservative	Christopher Whitfield	574	18.6	+2.7
Liberal Democrats	Simon Clark	374	12.1	+2.3
Majority		938	30.4	+6.1
Turnout		3086	49.1	−11.2
Labour hold		Swing		

Fountainbridge
Party	Candidate	Votes	%	±%
Labour	Lorna Slade	663	29.3	−12.2
Liberal Democrats	Helen Tyrell	654	28.9	+6.5
SNP	Alexander Orr	402	17.8	−8.6
Scottish Socialist	Barbara Scott	250	11.0	N/A
Conservative	Colin Robertson	230	10.2	+0.5
Independent	Alan Cran	64	2.8	N/A
Majority		9	0.4	−14.7
Turnout		2263	36.4	−15.6
Labour hold		Swing		

Gilmerton
Party	Candidate	Votes	%	±%
Labour	Kenneth Harrold*	1,297	43.6	−5.8
SNP	Alexandra Hardie	611	20.5	−5.7
Liberal Democrats	Helen Herd	436	14.7	+2.1
Conservative	Alexander Lewis	420	14.1	+2.3
Scottish Socialist	Dermot Ferry	211	7.1	N/A
Majority		686	23.1	−0.2
Turnout		2975	49.0	−9.9
Labour hold		Swing		

Granton
Party	Candidate	Votes	%	±%
Labour	Elizabeth Magennis*	1,249	48.7	+1.0
SNP	George Gordon	650	25.4	−6.2
Conservative	Antoinette Galbraith	359	14.0	+3.1
Liberal Democrats	Jennifer Martin	305	11.9	+2.1
Majority		599	23.3	+7.2
Turnout		2563	42.2	−16.5
Labour hold		Swing		

Gyle
Party	Candidate	Votes	%	±%
Liberal Democrats	Jennifer Dawe*	2,378	64.4	+11.7
Conservative	Ben Pinnington	594	15.8	−5.1
Labour	Kenneth Wright	420	11.2	−3.2
SNP	George Wyllie	360	9.6	−2.5
Majority		1784	48.6	+16.8
Turnout		3752	56.1	−12.0
Liberal Democrats hold		Swing		

Harbour
Party	Candidate	Votes	%	±%
Labour	Gordon Munro	885	31.5	−0.1
SNP	Robert Munn*	728	25.9	−10.8
Liberal Democrats	Douglas Chisholm	604	21.5	−0.6
Scottish Socialist	Adrian Cannon	309	11.0	N/A
Conservative	Sian Gibson-Watt	284	10.1	+0.6
Majority		157	5.6	+0.5
Turnout		2810	44.4	−9.6
Labour gain from SNP		Swing		

Holyrood
Party	Candidate	Votes	%	±%
Labour	William Cunningham*	754	33.9	−5.4
SNP	Nicholas Elliott-Cannon	574	25.8	−2.9
Liberal Democrats	Mark Wootton	420	18.9	−4.3
Conservative	Victoria Roberts	351	15.8	+7.0
Scottish Socialist	Morag Robertson	124	5.6	N/A
Majority		180	8.1	−2.5
Turnout		2223	35.5	−14.1
Labour hold		Swing		

Kaimes
Party	Candidate	Votes	%	±%
Labour	Donald Anderson*	1,281	49.3	+0.6
SNP	Marilyn Murray	474	18.3	−8.3
Conservative	Alastair Cullen	370	14.3	−0.2
Liberal Democrats	James Daniels-Emm	338	13.0	+2.8
Scottish Socialist	Alasdair Colquhoun	133	5.1	N/A
Majority		807	31.0	+8.9
Turnout		2596	41.5	−13.6
Labour hold		Swing		

Leith Links
Party	Candidate	Votes	%	±%
Liberal Democrats	Marjorie Thomas	1,258	44.2	−8.9
Labour	David Pickering	696	24.4	+2.6
SNP	Robert Seaton	463	16.3	−3.3
Scottish Socialist	Ian Mackechnie	265	9.3	N/A
Conservative	Simon Turner	166	5.8	+0.3
Majority		562	19.8	−11.6
Turnout		2848	47.0	−14.8
Liberal Democrats hold		Swing		

Lorne
Party	Candidate	Votes	%	±%
Labour	Philip Attridge*	1,199	42.4	−1.2
SNP	Hilary Brown	832	29.4	−5.6
Liberal Democrats	Sebastian Tombs	551	19.5	+5.6
Conservative	Eric Dunbar	246	8.7	+1.1
Majority		367	13.0	+4.4
Turnout		2828	45.3	−7.5
Labour hold		Swing		

Marchmont
Party	Candidate	Votes	%	±%
Liberal Democrats	Marilyne MacLaren*	1,347	58.0	−2.3
Labour	Adam Hug	328	14.1	−4.7
Conservative	Ian Baxter	248	10.7	+0.9
Scottish Socialist	Dilys Beaumont	218	9.4	N/A
SNP	Alison Service	183	7.9	−3.2
Majority		1019	43.9	+2.3
Turnout		2324	36.6	−21.4
Liberal Democrats hold		Swing		

Meadowbank
Party	Candidate	Votes	%	±%
Labour	Ian Perry*	1,113	33.9	−6.8
SNP	Stefan Tymkewycz	908	27.6	−0.7
Liberal Democrats	Catherine Duncan	600	18.3	+0.1
Scottish Socialist	Derek Anderson	348	10.6	N/A
Conservative	Alexandra Wallace	318	9.7	−3.2
Majority		205	6.3	−6.1
Turnout		3287	48.0	12.4
Labour hold		Swing		

Merchiston
Party	Candidate	Votes	%	±%
Liberal Democrats	Susan Tritton*	1,803	61.4	+7.6
Conservative	Neil Freshwater	438	14.9	+1.5
Labour	Catherine Bromley	371	12.6	−7.4
SNP	Sandy Howat	323	11.0	−1.8
Majority		1365	46.5	+12.8
Turnout		2935	44.9	−14.2
Liberal Democrats hold		Swing		

Milton
Party	Candidate	Votes	%	±%
Labour	Maureen Child*	1,473	46.7	+2.3
SNP	Michael O'Neill	620	19.6	−6.7
Conservative	John Smart	449	14.2	−1.4
Liberal Democrats	Ray Thomas	368	11.7	−2.0
Scottish Socialist	Christina Thomson	247	7.8	N/A
Majority		853	27.1	+9.0
Turnout		3157	50.5	−15.7
Labour hold		Swing		

Moat
Party	Candidate	Votes	%	±%
Labour	Andrew Burns*	1,236	43.6	−2.0
SNP	James Young	625	22.1	−8.3
Liberal Democrats	Andrew Jolly	378	13.3	+1.4
Conservative	Malcolm Durie	355	12.5	+0.4
Scottish Socialist	Alister Black	238	8.4	N/A
Majority		611	21.5	+6.3
Turnout		2832	47.3	−13.4
Labour hold		Swing		

Moredun
Party	Candidate	Votes	%	±%
Labour	Shiela Gilmore*	1,524	53.5	+3.4
SNP	Thomas Buchanan	830	29.1	−5.6
Conservative	Kenneth Currie	260	9.1	+1.9
Liberal Democrats	Mark Biggs	237	8.3	+0.4
Majority		694	24.4	+9.0
Turnout		2851	48.0	−11.6
Labour hold		Swing		

Mountcastle
Party	Candidate	Votes	%	±%
Labour	Ehtisham Shami	1,332	42.0	−8.1
SNP	James Bryce	834	26.3	+2.1
Conservative	Robin Macintosh	554	17.5	+2.8
Liberal Democrats	Ian Greig	448	14.1	+3.2
Majority		498	15.7	−10.2
Turnout		3168	50.0	−15.9
Labour hold		Swing		

Muirhouse/Drylaw
Party	Candidate	Votes	%	±%
Labour	Lesley Hinds*	1,357	53.6	−2.2
SNP	Susan Geddes	477	18.8	−7.4
Liberal Democrats	Kevin Lang	285	11.2	−1.0
Scottish Socialist	Scott MacDonald	202	8.0	N/A
Conservative	Mairi Johnstone	129	5.1	−0.7
Independent	Stanley Lawson	84	3.3	N/A
Majority		880	34.8	+5.2
Turnout		2534	42.2	−9.0
Labour hold		Swing		

Murray Burn
Party	Candidate	Votes	%	±%
Labour	Brian Fallon	974	40.8	−3.2
SNP	George Fraser	812	34.0	−2.5
Conservative	Inez Paisley	301	12.6	+2.5
Liberal Democrats	Gavin Hamilton	156	6.5	−3.0
Scottish Socialist	Colin Chilton	146	6.1	N/A
Majority		162	6.8	−0.7
Turnout		2389	38.9	−12.3
Labour hold		Swing		

Murrayfield
Party	Candidate	Votes	%	±%
Conservative	James Gilchrist*	1,719	50.4	+2.2
Liberal Democrats	Peter Galetzka	749	21.9	+2.4
Labour	Andrew Cochran	556	16.3	−4.8
SNP	Marilyn Work	263	7.7	−3.5
Scottish Socialist	Anne Edmonds	126	3.7	N/A
Majority		970	28.5	+1.3
Turnout		3413	51.7	−12.9
Conservative hold		Swing		

New Town
Party	Candidate	Votes	%	±%
Conservative	David Guest*	959	37.5	−2.9
Independent	Brian Ferrier	508	19.9	N/A
Liberal Democrats	Richard Burnett-Hall	411	16.1	−2.2
Labour	Ronald Watts	391	15.3	−10.2
SNP	Ronald Millar	243	9.5	−6.3
Liberal	John Hein	43	1.7	N/A
Majority		451	17.6	+2.7
Turnout		2555	37.0	−16.5
Conservative hold		Swing		

Newhaven
Party	Candidate	Votes	%	±%
Labour	Stephen Cardownie*	1,037	35.1	−5.8
SNP	Alexander Campbell	699	23.7	−4.4
Liberal Democrats	Niall Martin	519	17.6	+2.5
Conservative	Thomas Kerr	423	14.3	−1.5
Scottish Socialist	Julie Smith	276	9.3	N/A
Majority		338	11.4	−1.4
Turnout		2954	49.2	−9.4

Newington
Party	Candidate	Votes	%	±%
Liberal Democrats	Fred Mackintosh*	1,975	54.4	+10.7
Conservative	Alastair Wallace	735	20.2	−3.8
Labour	Angela Blacklock	528	14.5	−6.4
SNP	Stephen Cowley	276	7.6	−3.9
Scottish Socialist	Shirley Gibb	116	3.2	N/A
Majority		1240	34.2	+14.5
Turnout		3630	58.2	−10.6
Liberal Democrats hold		Swing		

North East Corstorphine
Party	Candidate	Votes	%	±%
Liberal Democrats	Paul Edie*	2,029	55.4	+6.2
Conservative	Steven Robertson	841	23.0	−0.6
Labour	James Bain	445	12.2	−2.6
SNP	Dorothy Westwood	346	9.5	−2.9
Majority		1188	32.4	+6.8
Turnout		3661	56.7	−13.8
Liberal Democrats hold		Swing		

North Morningside/Grange
Party	Candidate	Votes	%	±%
Liberal Democrats	Mike Pringle*	1,880	58.7	+1.5
Conservative	Charles Fairfield	614	19.2	+0.5
Labour	George Henderson	383	12.0	−3.7
SNP	Thomas Kielty	212	6.6	−1.8
Scottish Socialist	Mark Burgess	116	3.6	N/A
Majority		1266	39.5	+1.0
Turnout		3205	52.9	−12.2
Liberal Democrats hold		Swing		

Parkhead
Party	Candidate	Votes	%	±%
Labour	Ricky Henderson*	1,096	41.4	−4.2
SNP	William Henderson	834	31.5	+1.1
Conservative	Diana MacKenzie	482	18.2	+5.0
Liberal Democrats	Keith Smith	238	9.0	−1.8
Majority		262	9.9	−5.3
Turnout		2650	43.0	−10.9
Labour hold		Swing		

Pilton
Party	Candidate	Votes	%	±%
Labour	William Fitzpatrick*	1,064	50.0	−0.3
SNP	Derek Watson	559	26.3	−9.4
Scottish Socialist	William Black	227	10.7	N/A
Conservative	Daniel Thompson	146	6.9	+2.7
Liberal Democrats	Michael Falchikov	101	4.7	−5.2
Socialist Labour	David Jacobsen	32	1.5	N/A
Majority		505	23.7	+9.1
Turnout		2129	35.2	−16.6
Labour hold		Swing		

Portobello
Party	Candidate	Votes	%	±%
Labour	Lawrence Marshall*	1,397	41.9	−3.2
SNP	James Welsh	610	18.3	−7.9
Conservative	Alison Miller	607	18.2	−0.1
Liberal Democrats	Stephen Hawkins	403	12.1	+1.8
Scottish Socialist	Peter Cannell	314	9.4	N/A
Majority		787	23.6	+4.7
Turnout		3331	54.2	−12.7
Labour hold		Swing		

Prestonfield
Party	Candidate	Votes	%	±%
Liberal Democrats	Gordon Mackenzie	1,201	44.4	+21.0
Labour	Alan Tweedie	854	31.5	−11.1
SNP	Christian Albuisson	316	11.7	−5.4
Conservative	John McRae	293	10.8	−6.2
Liberal	Shiv Sharma	43	1.6	N/A
Majority		347	12.9	−6.3
Turnout		2707	41.2	−17.5
Liberal Democrats gain from Labour		Swing		

Queensferry
Party	Candidate	Votes	%	±%
Liberal Democrats	George Grubb*	1,968	54.9	+21.3
SNP	Norman Work	744	20.8	−5.8
Labour	Terence Airlie	548	15.3	−9.5
Conservative	Patricia Carmichael	322	9.0	−6.0
Majority		1224	34.1	+27.0
Turnout		3582	53.1	−13.3
Liberal Democrats hold		Swing		

Restalrig
Party	Candidate	Votes	%	±%
Labour	Ewan Aitken*	1,863	65.0	+4.9
SNP	Catherine Wilson	517	18.1	−10.8
Scottish Socialist	Stephen Coulson	193	6.7	N/A
Conservative	Michael Rzepecki-Raimes	151	5.3	N/A
Liberal Democrats	Thomas Cramb	140	4.9	−6.1
Majority		1346	46.9	+15.7
Turnout		2864	43.4	−10.8
Labour hold		Swing		

Sciennes
Party	Candidate	Votes	%	±%
Liberal Democrats	David Walker	1,677	53.0	−1.0
Conservative	Alastair Mowat	610	19.3	+3.3
Labour	Jennifer Kemp	563	17.8	−1.2
SNP	David Ross	316	10.0	1.0
Majority		1067	33.7	−1.3
Turnout		3166	47.7	−14.3
Liberal Democrats hold		Swing		

Shandon
Party	Candidate	Votes	%	±%
Labour	Donald Wilson*	938	30.6	−12.5
Liberal Democrats	Martin Lyons	821	26.8	+6.5
SNP	Gillian Grant	561	18.3	−5.7
Conservative	Graeme Brown	400	13.1	+0.5
Scottish Socialist	Gerard McGarvey	341	11.1	N/A
Majority		126	3.8	−15.3
Turnout		3061	47.4	−10.1
Labour hold		Swing		

Sighthill
Party	Candidate	Votes	%	±%
Labour	Frank Russell	960	42.8	−2.4
SNP	Ronald Cairns	654	29.2	−4.4
Liberal Democrats	Ewan Irvine	232	10.3	−2.0
Conservative	Andrew Maciver	231	10.3	+1.4
Scottish Socialist	Ian Munro	165	7.4	N/A
Majority		306	13.6	+2.0
Turnout		2242	35.4	−14.7
Labour hold		Swing		

South East Corstorphine
Party	Candidate	Votes	%	±%
Liberal Democrats	Phil Wheeler	2,007	59.8	+3.1
Labour	Elizabeth Stevenson	485	14.5	−3.5
Conservative	Ishbel Rendall	410	12.2	−0.6
SNP	Roderick Towers	319	9.5	−3.0
Scottish Socialist	Raymond Watt	134	4.0	N/A
Majority		1522	45.3	+6.6
Turnout		3355	53.3	−17.4
Liberal Democrats hold		Swing		

South Morningside
Party	Candidate	Votes	%	±%
Conservative	Mark McInnes	1,788	44.4	+6.8
Liberal Democrats	Kenneth McKinlay	1339	33.3	+8.5
Labour	John Clifford	608	15.1	−9.7
SNP	Rona Robertson	290	7.2	−5.5
Majority		449	11.1	−1.6
Turnout		4025	61.0	−2.5
Conservative hold		Swing		

Southside
Party	Candidate	Votes	%	±%
Labour	Robert Cairns*	866	34.0	−3.6
Liberal Democrats	John Elder	844	33.1	+3.3
SNP	Una Purdie	306	12.0	−10.0
Scottish Socialist	John Scott	275	10.8	N/A
Conservative	Helen Orr	217	8.5	−2.0
Liberal	Margaret Lea	41	1.6	N/A
Majority		22	0.9	−6.9
Turnout		2549	38.7	−16.7
Labour hold		Swing		

Stenhouse
Party	Candidate	Votes	%	±%
Labour	Eric Milligan*	1,496	48.0	+0.4
SNP	James Forbes	676	21.7	−3.0
Conservative	Lindsay Paterson	496	15.9	+2.8
Liberal Democrats	Rodger Spillane	448	14.4	−0.2
Majority		820	26.3	+3.4
Turnout		3116	49.0	−14.0
Labour hold		Swing		

Stockbridge
Party	Candidate	Votes	%	±%
Conservative	Michael Dixon	1,086	32.0	+−0.0
Labour	Krystyna Robinson	806	23.8	−9.5
Liberal Democrats	Dawn Williamson	640	18.9	−0.6
Independent	John Anderson	366	10.8	N/A
SNP	Jacqueline Chalmers	277	8.2	−7.0
Scottish Socialist	Graeme Bartley	214	6.3	N/A
Majority		280	8.2	+7.0
Turnout		3389	50.0	−13.9
Conservative gain from Labour		Swing		

Tollcross
Party	Candidate	Votes	%	±%
Labour	John Wigglesworth	601	31.1	−8.9
Liberal Democrats	Louise Lang	490	25.3	+2.3
Scottish Socialist	Lorraine Moffat	328	17.0	N/A
SNP	Iain Grimston	308	15.9	−9.5
Conservative	Francis McCormack	207	10.7	−0.9
Majority		111	5.8	−8.8
Turnout		1934	28.3	−15.7
Labour hold		Swing		

Trinity
Party	Candidate	Votes	%	±%
Conservative	Allan Jackson*	1,916	52.0	+15.1
Liberal Democrats	Jennifer Scott	875	23.7	−7.2
Labour	Terence Randell	476	12.9	−7.3
SNP	Stuart Johnson	263	7.1	−4.9
Scottish Socialist	Malcolm Cooper	156	4.2	N/A
Majority		1041	28.3	+22.3
Turnout		3686	59.2	−12.6
Conservative hold		Swing		

== Post-election changes ==
North Morningside/Grange by-election, 9th October 2003
Party	Candidate	Votes	%	±%
Liberal Democrats	N/A	883	43.1	−15.6
Conservative	N/A	743	36.3	+17.1
Green	N/A	185	9.0	N/A
Labour	N/A	141	6.9	−5.1
SNP	N/A	95	4.6	−2.0
Majority		140	6.8	−32.7
Turnout		2047	33.8	−19.1
Liberal Democrats hold		Swing		
