= Ceremony of the Keys (Edinburgh) =

Annual ceremony held at Holyrood Palace

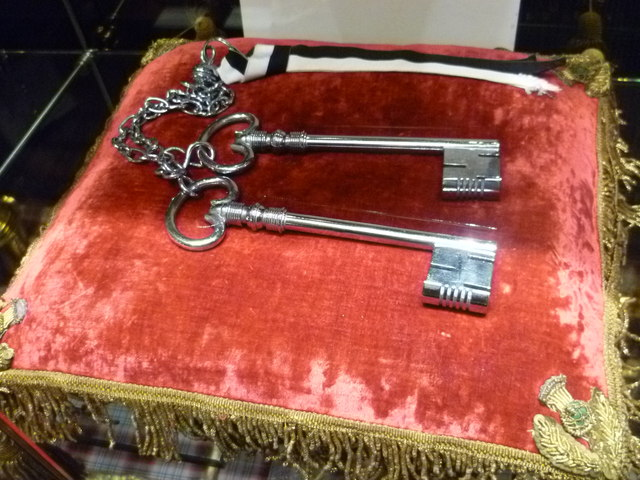
The ceremonial Keys of the City of Edinburgh

The Ceremony of the Keys is held in Holyrood Palace, Edinburgh, at the start of the British monarch's week-long residence there in July. Soon after the monarch's arrival, in the forecourt of the Palace, the King or Queen is symbolically offered the keys to the city of Edinburgh by the Lord Provost:

We, the Lord Provost and the members of the City of Edinburgh Council, welcome Your Majesty to the capital city of your Ancient and Hereditary Kingdom of Scotland and offer for your gracious acceptance the Keys of Your Majesty's good City of Edinburgh.

The monarch returns the keys, saying:

I return these keys, being perfectly convinced that they cannot be placed in better hands than those of the Lord Provost and Councillors of my good City of Edinburgh.

A Ceremony of the Keys is also held at the start of the General Assembly of the Church of Scotland when the Lord High Commissioner, as the monarch's representative, receives the keys from the Lord Provost.
