= Merchant Company of Edinburgh =

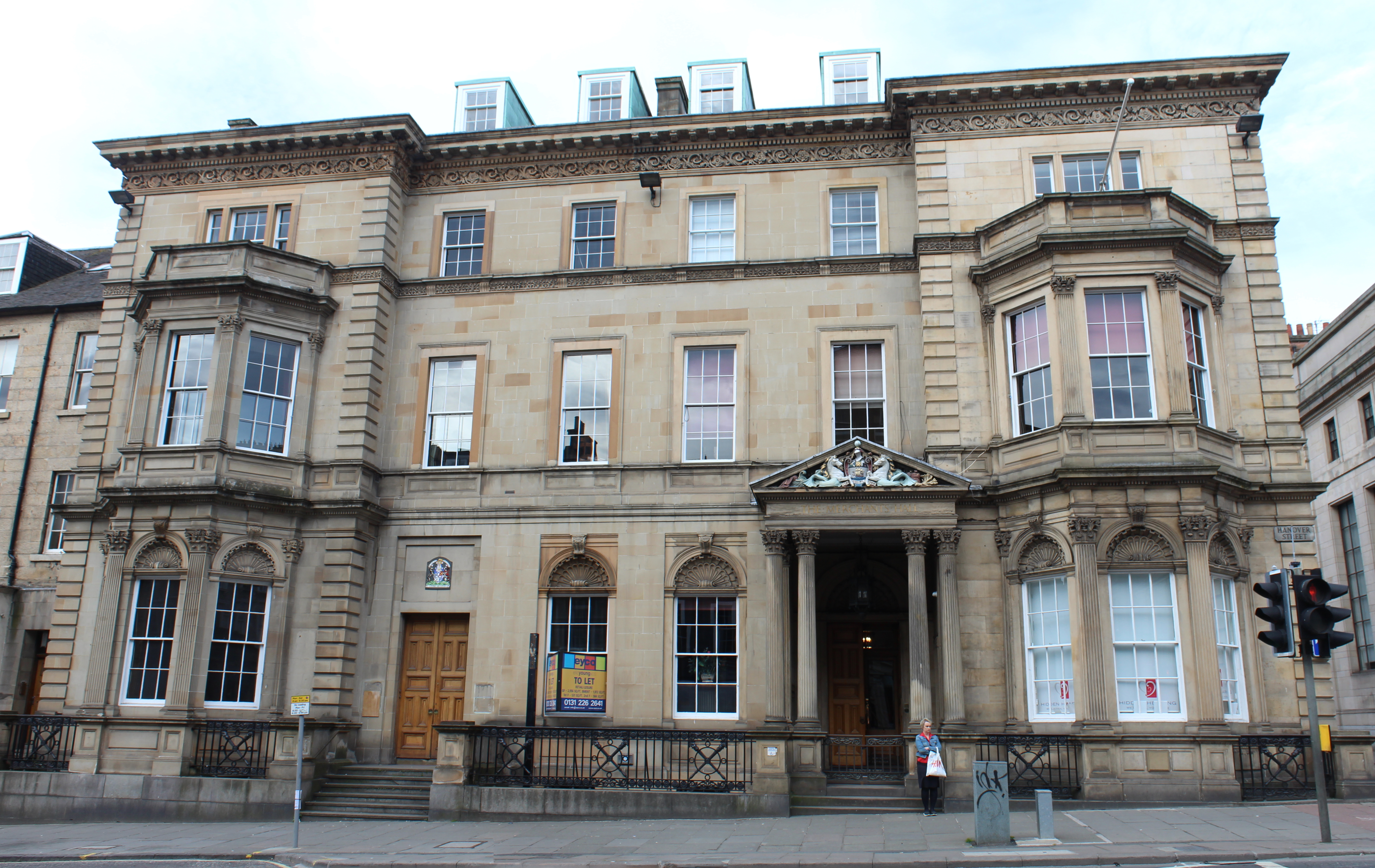
The Merchants' Hall

The Royal Company of Merchants of the City of Edinburgh, previously known as the Merchant Company of Edinburgh is a mercantile company and Guild officially recognised in 1681, but dating back to at least 1260. The Company, or Confraternity, was created to publicly represent, and protect the trading rights, of the merchants of the royal burgh of Edinburgh. Today, it continues to serve as a forum for businesses people and professionals operating in the City of Edinburgh. It also carries out a significant amount of charitable and educational work.

Along with the Incorporated Trades it forms part the Burgess Association of Edinburgh, an umbrella organisation for the trade bodies of the City of Edinburgh, who are discharged to propose individuals to the Edinburgh Lord Dean of Guild and Deacon Convener of the Trades to be made a Burgess of Edinburgh. Historically this was an important power, as being a Burgess was a necessity for anyone wanting to earn a living in Edinburgh. Both the Merchants' Company and the Incorporated Trades held formal roles within the governance of the City of Edinburgh, and sat on the City Council, until local government reforms in the late 20th century. Since then the public roles of the organisations have pivoted to primarily focus on the civic and ceremonial.

== History ==
=== Early days ===
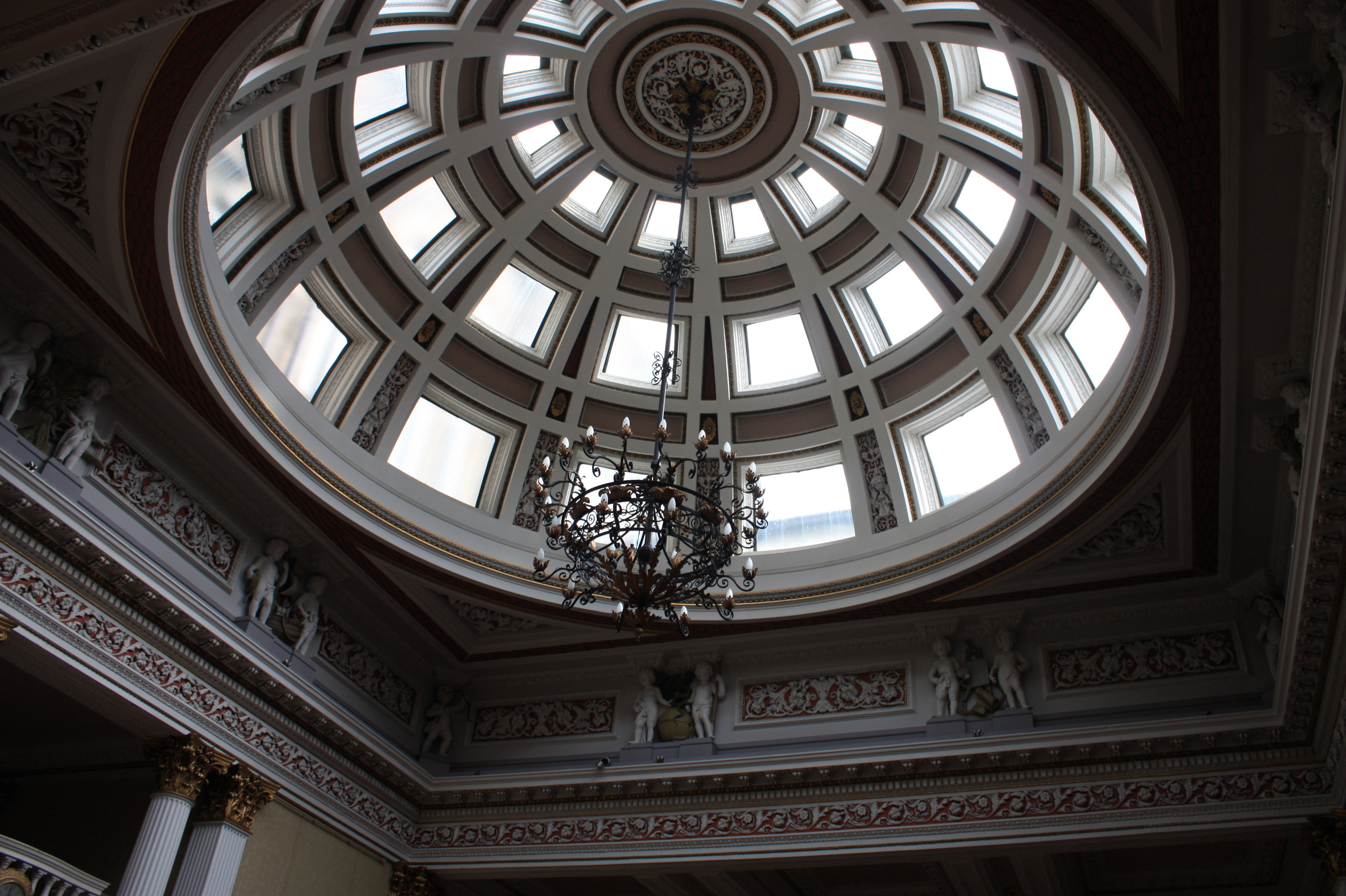
Dome of the Merchants' Hall Edinburgh

Edinburgh has a long history as a trading city. Prior to the Reformation there was a Guild of Merchants in the city. There was a great rivalry between the merchants and the craftsmen of the city, the latter forming the Incorporated Trades in the early 16th century. The Merchants – as many guilds in cities of the time – came to have a significant say in the running of the city. The Trades wanted to share in this power, and "constant bickering" ensued between them and the Merchants, who were unwilling to relinquish any.

In 1583, James IV issued a decree arbitral, sharing places on the town council between the Merchants and the Trades, but giving one more seat to the Merchants. By the late 1670s, the Merchants wished to consolidate their position and petitioned Charles II. In 1681, the king responded by granting a charter creating the Merchant Company of Edinburgh, which was ratified by the Parliament of Scotland in 1693. The 1681 formation had 82 members. Their premises was just west of the Tron Kirk off the Royal Mile. Following the improvements linked to the construction of South Bridge their building was refronted around 1790 when it was newly faced onto Hunter Square.

By 1691, the company had prospered and purchased a new meeting hall in the Cowgate in the Old Town by Magdalen Chapel (the hall was previously the house of Lord Oxenforde and cost the company £670 sterling). The company decorated its hall with 119 animal skins of Black Spanish leather stamped with Gold markings and turned an adjacent waste ground into a bowling green. The building was demolished due to the construction of George IV Bridge and only survives in the name of the street to the south: Merchant Street.

Carola Young later Macaulay was a milliner trading in Edinburgh who paid an annual fee to the company. When she married in 1710 her husband, Archibald Macaulay, was allowed to join because he had married Carola. Carola continued to trade on her own behalf.

Since 1365 the merchants of the city had sold their goods at the Mercat Cross, but in 1760 a new building called the Royal Exchange was opened (intended to rival the Royal Exchange in London), designed to provide a new venue for the Merchants to meet. The Merchants however preferred to meet at the Mercat Cross, and continued to meet at the site even though the original Mercat Cross was demolished in 1756.

The Merchant Company was founded in order to protect trading rights in the City of Edinburgh. In keeping with its guild origins, as its members shared many common interests, it took an interest in the running of the city, covering such fields as taxation, postal services and the city's water supply.

Edinburgh Merchant Company Act 1798
- Act of Parliament
- Parliament of Great Britain
- Long title: An act for enlarging the powers of the company of merchants of the city of Edinburgh.
- Citation: 37 Geo. 3. c. xv
- Territorial extent: Great Britain

Dates
- Royal assent: 5 April 1797
- Commencement: 5 April 1797 (Note: The Acts of Parliament (Commencement) Act 1793.)
Other legislation
Amended by	Edinburgh Merchant Company Act 1865
Relates to	Merchants of the City of Edinburgh Act 1827

Text of statute as originally enacted

Edinburgh Merchant Company Act 1898 (Note: Section 1.)
- Act of Parliament
- Parliament of the United Kingdom
- Long title: An Act to amend and enlarge the powers of the Edinburgh Merchant Company to provide for the better administration of the said Company and the Widows' Fund and George Grindlay's and William Watherston's Endowments and for other purposes.
- Citation: 61 & 62 Vict. c. xxii
- Territorial extent: United Kingdom

Dates
- Royal assent: 23 May 1898
- Commencement: 23 May 1898
- Repealed: 19 July 1960
Other legislation
Repealed by	Edinburgh Merchant Company Order Confirmation Act 1960

Status: Repealed

Text of statute as originally enacted

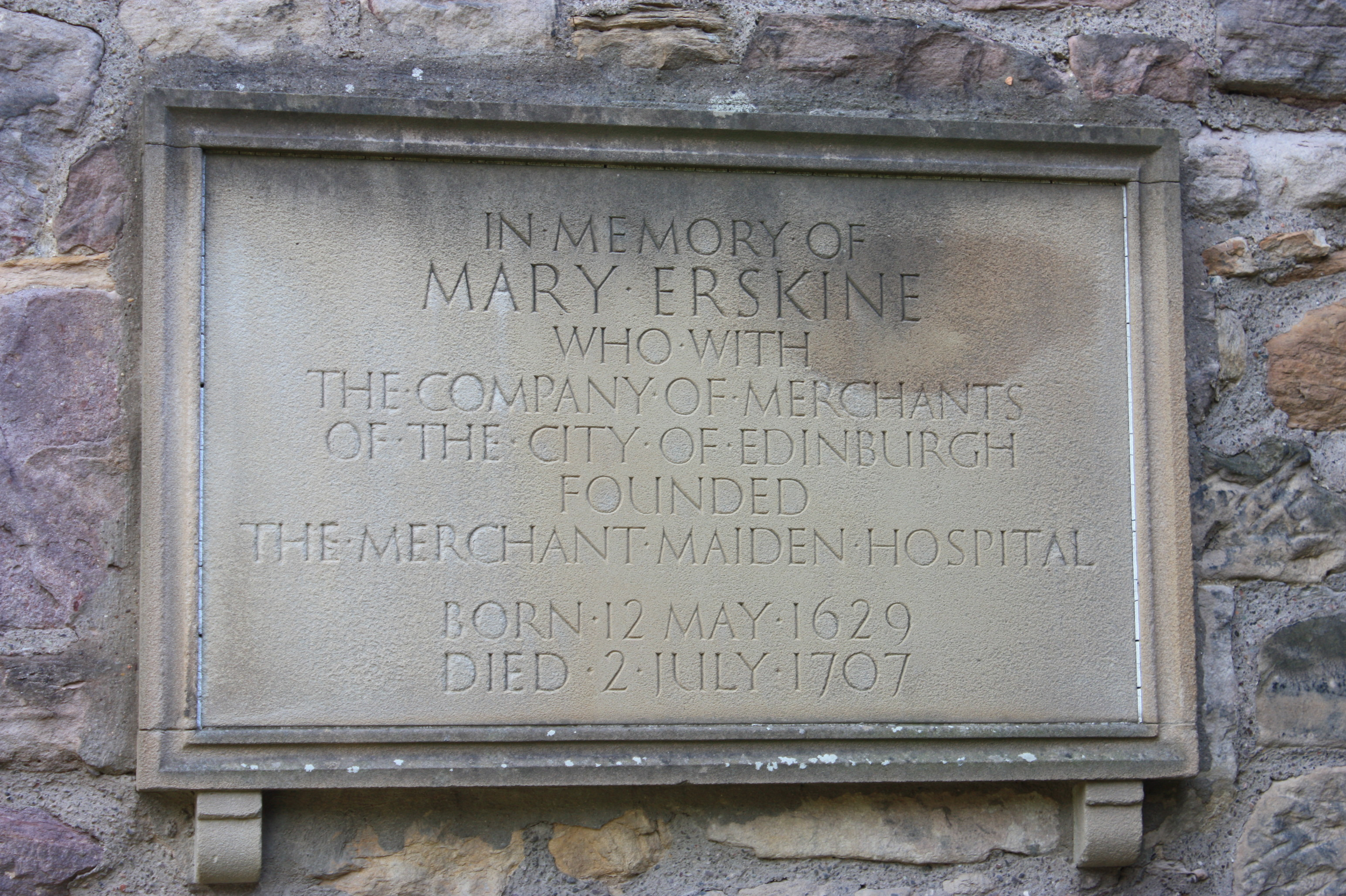
Mary Erskine's grave in Greyfriars Kirkyard with a note to the Merchant Company in support of the school

A further royal charter in 1777 amended provisions for the regulation of the company's affairs, and it was reincorporated by the Edinburgh Merchant Company Act 1898 (61 & 62 Vict. c. xxii). In 1788, the company moved to a new purpose built meeting hall at Hunter Square, near the Tron Church.

The company was also involved in educational and charitable work. As it grew in importance and repute, charitable trusts were often left to the company to be administered. In this way the company came to operate several hospital schools: the Merchant Maiden Hospital (now the Mary Erskine School), George Watson's Hospital (now George Watson's College), Daniel Stewart's Hospital (now part of Stewart's Melville College) and James Gillespie’s Hospital and Free School (now James Gillespie's High School, handed over to management of Edinburgh School Board in 1908).

=== Reform ===
The 19th century was a time of significant changes for the Merchant Company.

The company's trade monopoly was ended – along with those of other guilds – by the Trading Within Burghs Act 1846. Nevertheless the company continued to play an active role in issues affecting the city, and it flourished.

At the same time, the hospital school system was falling into disrepute. A royal commission had been established to consider the provision of education for the masses; its report changed the rules pertaining to educational trusts. The company wished to consolidate and preserve its position, and took advantage of this; in fairly short order, the hospitals were transitioned to be principally day schools in 1870. In 1879, the company moved to its current location on Hanover Street, taking over the former premises of the City of Glasgow Bank which had failed.

The company was granted the title "Royal" by Her Majesty Queen Elizabeth on 11 December 2017, during the Master-ship of Donald S. F. Young. This honour was bestowed upon the company by the Lord Lyon King of Arms, The Reverend Canon Dr Joseph John Morrow, at a company meeting in February 2018.

== Today ==
The company operates as a modern business forum, whilst retaining some of its ancient traditions and privileges. It holds social and networking events and continues to manage the substantial charitable and educational foundations under its care. The company's schools are operated by the Merchant Company Education Board, a registered charity under Scottish law.

The company's coat of arms, granted in 1693, comprises elements reflecting the importance of world-wide trade, the royal-charter status the company holds, and its origins as a merchants' guild.

The company's motto is Terraque Marique - "by land and by sea".

The company headquarters is the Merchants' Hall on Hanover Street in Edinburgh.

Along with The Incorporated Trades of Edinburgh they are members of The Court of Deans of Guild of Scotland. The immediate past Master of the Royal Company of Merchants is granted the ancient title of Lord Dean of Guild.

== Membership ==
Membership of the Merchant Company is open to those who carry on any of a range of businesses, trades and professions. New members are required to be elected by the Master's Court. Members must reside or carry on their business or trade either in Edinburgh or within 20 miles (32 km) of General Register House in Edinburgh.

== Former masters ==
- Thomas Jamieson Boyd 1869-71
- Josiah Livingston 1881-1882
- John Clapperton 1873-1874
