= Alex Wood (politician) =

Former Labour leader of Edinburgh City Council

Alex Wood (born 1950, Dundee) is a former Labour leader of Edinburgh City Council in Scotland.

== Biography ==
He was educated at Paisley Grammar School, the New University of Ulster, Moray House College of Education, the University of Edinburgh, the University of Stirling and the University of Strathclyde.

He was a member of the Labour Party from 1969 until 1987. He was a member of the National Committee of the Labour Party Young Socialists from 1973 to 1975. In the early 1970s Wood was a leading figure in the entryist Militant tendency in Scotland who left that party after it decided to support the creation of a devolved Scottish Assembly. Subsequently, he became a trenchant critic of Militant.

He subsequently became a leading figure in the Labour Co-ordinating Committee in Scotland and wrote its pamphlet on Labour and Ireland. He was Labour Parliamentary candidate for Dumfries in 1979, and for West Edinburgh in 1983 (having been elected to Edinburgh District Council in 1980 and having become leader of the Edinburgh District Council Labour Group in 1982) and in May 1984 became leader of the first ever majority Labour administration in the city.

Members of the Labour group of councillors felt however that his politics were further left than theirs and in May 1986 voted they had no confidence in his leadership. He was replaced as council leader with Mark Lazarowicz.

Subsequently, Wood resigned his council seat, left Labour and joined the 1988 version of the Scottish Socialist Party.

Shortly after the demise of the SSP, Wood joined the Scottish National Party.

A teacher by profession, he retired as headteacher of Wester Hailes Education Centre in Edinburgh in August 2011. He had also been seconded (2008–09) as Headteacher to Tynecastle High School. He writes on educational issues in The Herald, and writes regular columns on educational matters in SecEd, Holyrood Magazine, the Times Educational Supplement Scotland and contributes to the Scottish Review, Lothian Life and the Caledonian Mercury.

== Notes ==
Civic offices
Preceded by ?	Leader of Edinburgh City Council; 1984–1986	Succeeded by Mark Lazarowicz
