= 1984 City of Edinburgh District Council election =

1984 Scottish local government election

1984 City of Edinburgh Council election
← 1980	3 May 1984	1988 →

All 62 seats to Edinburgh City Council 32 seats needed for a majority
	First party	Second party
Party	Labour	Conservative
Last election	25	31
Seats won	34	22
Seat change	▲9	▼9
Popular vote	66,384	56,569
Percentage	38.7%	32.9%
Swing	▲2.7%	▼7.3%
	Third party	Fourth party
Party	Alliance	SNP
Last election	2	2
Seats won	4	2
Seat change	▲2	0
Popular vote	36,867	8,298
Percentage	21.5%	4.8%
Swing	▲10.1%	▼4.6%
- Map of council wards
Council control before election
No overall control
Council control after election
Labour

Following the historic election a red flag was raised above the city chambers, although it was soon taken down.

Elections for the City of Edinburgh District Council took place on Thursday 3 May 1984, alongside elections to the councils of Scotland's various other districts.

The election was the first time Labour had ever won a majority on the Edinburgh Council, with the party winning 34 of the City's 62 seats. The Conservatives came second, on 22 seats, whilst the SDP-Liberal Alliance won 4, and the SNP 2. Labour would retain its dominance for the next 23 years, until the 2007 election. Mark Lazarowicz and Nigel Griffiths played prominent roles in the election, and would later both become Edinburgh Members of Parliament for Labour. Alex Wood was the leader of the Labour group.

Following the election a red flag was raised above the Edinburgh City Chambers, but it was taken down after a day.

== Aggregate results ==
City of Edinburgh District Council election, 1984
Party	Seats	Gains	Losses	Net gain/loss	Seats %	Votes %	Votes	+/−
Labour	34	11	1	▲10		38.7	66,384	▲2.7
Conservative	22	0	10	▼10		32.9	56,569	▼7.3
Alliance	4	3	1	▲2		21.5	36,867	▲10.1
SNP	2	1	1	0		4.8	8,298	▼4.6
Independent	0	0	1	▼1		0.3	531	▼1.1
Other parties	0	0	1	▼1	0.0	1.8	3,038	

== Ward results ==
7th, Pilton
Party	Candidate	Votes	%
Labour	A. Wood	1,182	89.5
Conservative	J. K. M. Gilbert	77	5.8
Alliance	H. B. T. Holland	61	4.6
Majority		1,105	
Turnout		1,320	
Labour hold			

31st, North Hailes
Party	Candidate	Votes	%
Labour	M. Lazarowicz	1,524	
Alliance	Joyce Heggie	163	
Conservative	A. Reid	163	
SNP	J. Russell	123	
Majority		1,361	
Turnout		1,973	
Labour hold			

32nd, South Hailes
Party	Candidate	Votes	%
Labour	N. Griffiths	1,228	
SNP	N. R. MacCallum	273	
Conservative	Sheila L. Black	201	
Alliance	J. Bulat	143	
Majority		955	
Turnout			
Labour hold			

45th, Portobello
Party	Candidate	Votes	%
Labour	G. Kerevan	1,212	
Conservative	Karin J. C. Dodds	1,069	
Independent	W. Westwood	531	
Alliance	Marjorie Jenkins-Thomas	396	
SNP	J. Leslie	165	
Scottish Ecology	Joan M. C. Grant	47	
Majority		143	
Turnout			
Labour hold			
