= 1988 City of Edinburgh District Council election =

1988 Scottish local government election

1988 City of Edinburgh Council election
← 1984	5 May 1988	1992 →

All 62 seats to Edinburgh City Council 32 seats needed for a majority
	First party	Second party
Party	Labour	Conservative
Last election	34	22
Seats won	33	23
Seat change	▼1	▲1
Popular vote	70,491	70,561
Percentage	36.6%	36.6%
Swing	▼2.1%	▲3.7%
	Third party	Fourth party
Party	SLD	SNP
Last election	4	2
Seats won	4	2
Seat change	0	0
Popular vote	23,422	27,162
Percentage	12.2%	14.1%
Swing	▼9.3%	▲9.3%
- Map of council wards
Council control before election
Labour
Council control after election
Labour

Elections for the City of Edinburgh District Council took place on Thursday 5 May 1988, alongside elections to the councils of Scotland's various other districts.

Labour had won control of the Council for the first time ever in the previous elections, and managed to retain its control. Voter turnout was 53.2%, up from 47.6% in the previous election.

== Aggregate results ==
City of Edinburgh District Council election, 1988
Party	Seats	Gains	Losses	Net gain/loss	Seats %	Votes %	Votes	+/−
Labour	33	0	▼1	▼1		36.6	70,491	▼2.1
Conservative	23	▲1	0	▲1		36.6	70,561	▲3.7
SLD	4	0	0	0		12.2	23,422	▼9.3
SNP	2	0	0	0		14.1	27,162	▲9.3
SDP	0	0	0	0	0.0	0.3	578	New
Independent	0	0	0	0	0.0	0.1	30	▼0.2
Other parties	0	0	0	0	0.0	0.4	727	
