= WHEC =

WHEC may refer to:

- USCG High Endurance Cutter, one of three classes of U.S. Coast Guard vessel
- WHEC-TV, Rochester, New York
- Wester Hailes Education Centre, a secondary school and leisure centre in Edinburgh, Scotland
