= National Executive Committee of the Scottish National Party =

Political party leadership

The National Executive Committee of the Scottish National Party is the governing body of the Scottish National Party (SNP). It meets monthly and is charged with devising the SNP's national political strategy to help to deliver the party's aims. It oversees the organisation and administration of the party. NEC members report to National Conference and members other than Ordinary and Regional Members are open to question by delegates.

== History ==
Ian Hudghton succeeded Winnie Ewing as party president in 2005. In 2020, Michael Russell was elected president by the NEC over other candidates Craig Murray and Corri Wilson. The internal election was impacted by the Common Weal Group (CWG) which advocated more transparency and a greater role for members. In 2021, the NEC approved of the Bute House Agreement between the SNP and the Greens.

== Membership ==
Membership consists of:

- the National Office Bearers
- two ordinary members who are parliamentarians
- sixteen regional members who are not parliamentarians
- a member representing each of the Party's parliamentary groups
- a member representing the Association of Nationalist Councillors
- a member representing each Affiliated Organisation

The SNP elected its NEC in 2023:

NEC elected members
National Office Bearers
President	Maureen Watt
National Treasurer	Stuart McDonald
National Secretary	Alex Kerr
Organisation Convener	Jen Layden
Local Government Convener	Katy Loudon
Policy Development Convener	Deidre Brock
Member Support Convener	Naz Anis-Miah
Women's Convener	Katie Hagmann
Equalities Convener	Sadie Matthews
BAME Convener	Shelly-Ann Brown
Disabled Members' Convener	Andy Stuart
Young Scots for Independence (YSI)' Convener	Tommy Kelly
Parliamentarians
Parliamentarian	Tom Arthur (Scottish politician)
Parliamentarian	Ben Macpherson (politician)
Regional members
Viktoria Cameron (Central Scotland)	Stephen Shilton (Central Scotland)
Christina Cannon (Glasgow)	Alison Thewliss (Glasgow)
Ian Cockburn (Highlands & Islands)	Frances Murray (Highlands & Islands)
Sinéad Collins (Lothian)	Silas McGilvray (Lothian)
Alycia Hayes (Mid Scotland & Fife)	Alyn Smith (Mid Scotland & Fife)
Siobhan Tolland (North East Scotland)	Logan Unwin (North East Scotland)
Marshall Douglas (South Scotland)	Sarah Mccahill (South Scotland)
Michelle Campbell (West Scotland)	Michael Gibbons (West Scotland)

Representatives from the Parliamentary Groups, the Association of SNP Councillors and Affiliated Organisations also sit on the National Executive Committee.

== Historic membership ==
=== 2020 ===
In 2020, the NEC was elected. The candidates are listed below:

National Office Bearers
National Treasurer: Douglas Chapman; Colin Beattie	Organisation Convener: Rob Thomson; Stacey Bradley	BAME Convener: Sameeha Rehman; Graham Campbell	Disabled Members' Convener: Scott McFarlane; Jamie Szymkowiak; Dylan Roberts	Policy Development Convener: Alyn Smith; Graeme McCormick; Chris Hanlon	Elected NEC Member: Neale Hanvey; Tommy Sheppard; Angela Constance; Alison Thewliss; Joanna Cherry
National Secretary: David Henry; Morgwn Davies; Stewart Stevenson; Lorna Finn; Kirsteen Currie	Local Government Convener: Lynne Anderson; Jonathan McColl; Allan Stubbs; Kelly Parry	Women's Convener: Caroline McAllister; Delia Henry; Katherine Sanders; Caroline Keenan; Rhiannon Spear	Equalities Convener: Siobhan Tolland; Fiona Robertson; Lynne Anderson	Members Support Convener: Katherine Sanders; Michael Blackshaw; Douglas Daniel; Simon Hayter; Greg Lennon	Elected NEC Member: Neale Hanvey; Tommy Sheppard; Angela Constance; Alison Thewliss; Joanna Cherry

Regional Members
Region	Open List (1 elected)	Female List (1 elected)
Central Scotland	Findlay MacGregor; John Allison; Ross Clark; Shahid Farooq; Greg Lennon; Cameron McManus; Lesley Mitchell; Farah Faranza; Lynne Anderson	Lesley Mitchell; Farah Faranza; Lynne Anderson
Glasgow	Lorna Finn; Christina Cannon; Malcolm Balfour; Johnathon Mackie; Alexander Mitchell; Rory Steel; Suzanne McLaughlin; Alex Kerr	Lorna Finn; Christina Cannon; Suzanne McLaughlin
Highlands and Islands	Laura Mitchell; Jeremie Fernandes; Ken Gowans; Will Mackay; Emma Roddick; Munro Ross; Ian Cockburn; James Duncan	Laura Mitchell; Emma Roddick
Lothian	Katherine Sanders; Callum Anderson; Frank Anderson; Michael Blackshaw; Robert de Bold; Sinead Collins; Andrew Diak; Findlay McFarlane	Catriona MacDonald; Katherine Sanders; Eleanor Bird; Sinead Collins
Mid Scotland and Fife	Allison Graham; Kirsty Jarvis; Nick Cole; Jamie McDiarmid; Roger Mullin	Allison Graham; Kirsty Jarvis
North East Scotland	Robert Rosie; Siobhan Tolland; Ross Cassie; Dorothy Jessiman; Jack Boag; Doug Daniel; Ciaran McRae; Kate Monaghan; Jack O'Neill; Margate Rankie	Dorothy Jessiman; Siobhan Tolland; Kate Monaghan; Margate Rankie
South Scotland	Corri Wilson; Heather Anderson; Amanda Burgauer; Erin Mwembo; Laura Brennan-Whitefield; William Mills; Simon Ritchie; Morgwn Davies; Robert Davidson; Fraser Thompson	Heather Anderson; Amanda Burgauer; Erin Mwembo
West Scotland	John Gatens; Delia Henry; Brian Lawson; Graeme McCormick; Chris McCusker; Chris McEleny; Osama Nadeem; Callum Reid; Ellen McMaster; Malcolm Kerr; Gavin Lundy; Ian Dickson	Emma Hendrie; Delia Henry; Ellen McMaster

==== Committees ====
Members Conduct Committee (9 candidates can be selected)	Conduct Appeals Committee (7 candidates can be selected)
Chris Hanlon; Sharon Kinning; Cynthia Guthrie; Ellen McMaster; Caroline McAllister; Corri Wilson; Delia Henry; Lynne Anderson; Malcolm Balfour; Michael Blackshaw; Declan Blench; Laura Doherty; Daniel Forbes; Simon Hayter; Kirsty Jarvis; Greg Lennon; Paul Leinster; Kenny MacLaren; Malcolm Mitchell; Munro Ross; Subhan Tahir; Farah Faranza; Robert Thomson; James Duncan; Neale Hanvey; Gavin Lundy; Owen Thompson; Amanda Burgauer	Margaret Lynch; Amanda Burgauer; Rod Campbell; Ewan Hamilton; Greg Lennon; Lachlan McNeill; Malcolm Mitchell; Farah Faranza; Robert Thomson; Caroline McAllister
Policy Development Committee (10 candidates can be selected)	Conference Committee (10 candidates can be selected)
Glasgow Open List: Rory Steel; Malcolm Balfour; Paul Leinster; Alexander Belic; Highlands and Islands Open List: Munro Ross; Paul Oldham; Highlands and Islands Female List: Kirsteen Currie; Lothian Open List: Tim Rideout; Katherine Sanders; Danny Aston; Frank Anderson; Lothian Female List: Katherine Sanders; Mid Scotland and Fife Open List: Rosemary Hunter; Joseph Brannigan; Lee Robb; Nick Cole; Chris Hanlon; Mid Scotland and Fife Female List: Rosemary Hunter; North East Scotland Open List: Kairin van Sweeden; South Scotland Open List: Katie Hagmann; Simon Ritchie; Julia Marrs; Cynthia Guthrie; South Scotland Female List: Cynthia Guthrie; Katie Hagmann; Julia Marrs; West Scotland Open List: Stephanie Melnick; Summer Chen; Caroline Bamforth; William Mylet; Colin Milne; West Scotland Female List: Stephanie Melnick; Summer Chen; Caroline Bamforth; Outwith Scotland; Jonathan Kiehlmann; Gordon Millar	Open list (Five can be selected): Rory Steel; Chris Hanlon; Chris Duffy; Corri Wilson; Fraser Thompson; Malcolm Balfour; Alexander Belic; Adam Cabuk; Christina Cannon; Roz Currie; Iain Gallagher; Patrick Grady; Delia Henry; Joan Hutcheson; Kenny MacLaren; Jack O'Neill; Munro Ross; Subhan Tahir; Suzanne McLaughlin; Kirsteen Currie; Danny Aston; Anne McLaughlin; Female List (Five candidates can be selected): Rosemary Hunter; Anne McLaughlin; Corri Wilson; Christina Cannon; Roz Currie; Delia Henry; Joan Hutcheson; Suzanne McLaughlin; Kirsteen Currie; Catriona MacDonald
