= 1992 City of Edinburgh District Council election =

1992 Scottish local government election

1992 City of Edinburgh Council election
- 7 May 1992

All 62 seats to Edinburgh City Council 32 seats needed for a majority
	First party	Second party
Party	Labour	Conservative
Last election	33	23
Seats won	30	23
Seat change	▼3	0
Popular vote	48,756	67,266
Percentage	29.2%	40.2%
Swing	▼7.4%	▲3.6%
	Third party	Fourth party
Party	Liberal Democrats	SNP
Last election	4	2
Seats won	7	2
Seat change	▲3	0
Popular vote	25,775	24,087
Percentage	15.4%	14.4%
Swing	▲3.2%	▲0.3%
- Map showing results in Edinburgh District Council wards
Council control before election
Labour
Council control after election
No overall control

Elections to the City of Edinburgh District Council took place in May 1992, alongside elections to the councils of Scotland's various other districts.

Labour, which had won control of the Council for the first time ever in the 1984 election, lost overall control but managed to remain the largest party on the council despite losing the popular vote amid a swing to the Conservatives in the city. The Liberal Democrats were able to capture several new seats in the centre of the city, including Marchmont, Morningside, and Sciennes. Voter turnout was 48.2%, down 5% from the previous election.

== Aggregate results ==
The result of the election

City of Edinburgh District Council election, 1992
Party	Seats	Gains	Losses	Net gain/loss	Seats %	Votes %	Votes	+/−
Labour	30	0	3	▼3		29.2	48,756	▼7.4
Conservative	23	3	3	0		40.2	67,266	▲3.6
Liberal Democrats	7	3	0	▲3		15.4	25,775	▲3.2
SNP	2	1	1	0		14.4	24,087	▲0.3
Green	0	0	0	0	0.0	0.8	1,219	New
Other parties	0	0	0	0	0.0	0.3	399	▼0.1
