= List of listed buildings in Edinburgh/12 =

This is a list of listed buildings in Edinburgh, Scotland.

== List ==
Name	Location	Date Listed	Grid Ref. (Note: Sometimes known as OSGB36, the grid reference (where provided) is based on the British national grid reference system used by the Ordnance Survey. • "Guide to National Grid". Ordnance Survey. • "Get-a-map". Ordnance Survey.)	Geo-coordinates	Notes	LB Number (Note: Historic Environment Scotland assign a unique alphanumeric identifier to each designated site in Scotland, for listed buildings this always begins with "LB", for example "LB12345".)	Image
17 Academy Street				55°58′15″N 3°10′13″W	Category B	26718	Upload Photo
29 Caledonian Crescent, Dalry Public Baths, With Boundary Walls And Railings				55°56′32″N 3°13′04″W	Category B	26721	Upload Photo
Ashley Terrace Lockhart Bridge				55°55′53″N 3°13′37″W	Category B	26730	Upload another image
9 Bath Street				55°57′11″N 3°06′48″W	Category B	26741	Upload Photo
17-35 (Odd Nos) Braid Avenue				55°55′34″N 3°12′13″W	Category C(S)	26745	Upload Photo
18-25 (Inclusive Nos) Ardmillan Terrace And 60-64 (Even Nos) Angle Park Terrace				55°56′16″N 3°13′34″W	Category B	26695	Upload another image
Bannerman And Cuthill, George Square, And 2 Causewayend				56°32′44″N 3°16′07″W	Category C(S)	23140	Upload Photo
253 High Street, 2 Warriston's Close And 14 Cockburn Street, City Chambers				55°57′01″N 3°11′25″W	Category A	17597	Upload another image
Dalmeny Village, 3 And 4 Main Street				55°58′55″N 3°22′20″W	Category B	5533	Upload Photo
Dalmeny House, Stable Block				55°59′13″N 3°20′12″W	Category B	5549	Upload Photo
Craigiehall, Grotto				55°57′47″N 3°19′50″W	Category C(S)	5562	Upload Photo
Craigiehall, Grotto Bridge				55°57′46″N 3°19′47″W	Category B	5563	Upload Photo
19 Cramond Brig Toll, Willowbank Cottage, Including Boundary Wall				55°57′55″N 3°19′00″W	Category C(S)	5568	Upload Photo
Dalmeny House, Longcraig Gate Lodge				55°59′36″N 3°22′24″W	Category C(S)	5507	Upload Photo
114 And 116 Trinity Road, North Trinity House, With Boundary Walls And Gatepiers				55°58′44″N 3°12′19″W	Category C(S)	4445	Upload Photo
1 And 2 Swanston Village				55°53′33″N 3°12′55″W	Category C(S)	45842	Upload Photo
5 And 6 Swanston Village				55°53′33″N 3°12′56″W	Category C(S)	45844	Upload Photo
3 Bonnyhaugh Lane				55°58′16″N 3°11′18″W	Category C(S)	45922	Upload Photo
6 And 7 Bonnyhaugh Lane				55°58′15″N 3°11′18″W	Category C(S)	45924	Upload Photo
11-19 (Odd Nos) East London Street				55°57′33″N 3°11′24″W	Category C(S)	45943	Upload Photo
18 Forth Street				55°57′29″N 3°11′14″W	Category B	45951	Upload Photo
20 And 22 Forth Street				55°57′29″N 3°11′13″W	Category B	45952	Upload Photo
78-82 (Even Numbers) Portobello High Street, Former Shrub Mount				55°57′16″N 3°07′00″W	Category C(S)	46336	Upload Photo
231 Canongate, Old Sailor's Ark				55°57′04″N 3°10′56″W	Category C(S)	46707	Upload Photo
12 And 12A Laverockbank Road, Bankhead House, With Boundary Wall And Gatepiers				55°58′42″N 3°12′02″W	Category C(S)	46735	Upload Photo
102 Lower Granton Road, Wardie Hotel, With Yard Wall And Gatepiers				55°58′48″N 3°12′58″W	Category C(S)	46739	Upload Photo
26 York Road, Cairney House, With Boundary Wall And Gatepiers				55°58′42″N 3°12′10″W	Category C(S)	46765	Upload Photo
34 York Road, Lomond House, With Gateway And Boundary Walls				55°58′44″N 3°12′11″W	Category C(S)	46767	Upload Photo
26 Brougham Street, Former Parsonage House				55°56′36″N 3°12′07″W	Category B	47025	Upload Photo
77 Lauriston Place, With Boundary Wall And Railings				55°56′40″N 3°12′02″W	Category C(S)	47036	Upload Photo
125-165 (Odd Nos) Lothian Road, 6 And 8 Bread Street And 48 And 50 East Fountainbridge				55°56′44″N 3°12′18″W	Category B	47047	Upload another image
1 Gilmerton Road, Liberton Bank House				55°55′32″N 3°09′59″W	Category C(S)	47155	Upload Photo
Horne Terrace Union Canal No 1 Viewforth Bridge				55°56′26″N 3°12′48″W	Category B	47615	Upload Photo
Cammo Road, Cammo Estate, Knoll (Off Cammo Walk)				55°57′11″N 3°19′17″W	Category B	47715	Upload another image
33, 34 And 35 Castle Terrace, Including Boundary Wall And Railings				55°56′49″N 3°12′10″W	Category A	47856	Upload another image
27-41 (Odd Nos) Forrest Road				55°56′46″N 3°11′31″W	Category C(S)	47864	Upload Photo
43-49 (Odd Nos) Forrest Road				55°56′44″N 3°11′30″W	Category C(S)	47865	Upload Photo
28-32 (Even Nos) Keir Street, Including Boundary Wall And Railings				55°56′43″N 3°11′50″W	Category B	47882	Upload Photo
King's Stables Road, St Cuthbert's Churchyard, Former Toolhouse				55°56′55″N 3°12′14″W	Category C(S)	47884	Upload Photo
47-55 (Odd Nos) Lothian Road				55°56′52″N 3°12′21″W	Category B	47893	Upload another image
85-93 (Odd Nos) Lothian Road				55°56′48″N 3°12′20″W	Category C(S)	47894	Upload Photo
17 And 19 Spittal Street And 2-6 (Even Nos) Grindlay Street				55°56′47″N 3°12′12″W	Category C(S)	47898	Upload Photo
3 Victoria Terrace, Baden-Powell House				55°56′56″N 3°11′36″W	Category B	47902	Upload Photo
8, 9 And 10 Bristo Place And 3 Bristo Port				55°56′48″N 3°11′25″W	Category B	48211	Upload another image
Edinburgh Castle, Gatehouse				55°56′55″N 3°11′55″W	Category A	48218	Upload another image
Edinburgh Castle, Portcullis Gate And Argyle Tower				55°56′56″N 3°11′59″W	Category A	48227	Upload another image
Edinburgh Castle, St Margaret's Chapel				55°56′55″N 3°12′00″W	Category A	48228	Upload another image
10-18 (Even Nos) Forrest Road, Oddfellows Hall				55°56′45″N 3°11′27″W	Category B	48241	Upload another image
7-10 (Inclusive Nos) Teviot Place				55°56′44″N 3°11′25″W	Category C(S)	48249	Upload Photo
West Princes Street Gardens, Police Box				55°57′01″N 3°12′19″W	Category B	48252	Upload another image
Sunbury Street, Belford Mews, Sunbury House, (Former Whytock And Reid Cabinet Makers)				55°57′08″N 3°13′16″W	Category B	48279	Upload Photo
Summerhall (former The Royal (Dick) School Of Veterinary Studies)				55°56′23″N 3°10′56″W	Category B	48536	Upload another image See more images
2-8 (Even Nos) Coltbridge Terrace, Including Boundary Walls				55°56′49″N 3°14′07″W	Category C(S)	48884	Upload Photo
Murrayfield Avenue, Police Box				55°56′47″N 3°14′13″W	Category C(S)	48898	Upload Photo
37 Ravelston Dykes Road, Wall Incorporating Old Fireplace (1 Of 2)				55°57′09″N 3°15′22″W	Category B	48906	Upload Photo
Ravelston Dykes Road, Entrance Gateway And Adjoining Walls To East Of Nos 65-67				55°57′03″N 3°15′14″W	Category B	48908	Upload Photo
Craigs Bank, Craigsbank Parish Church (Church Of Scotland) With Hall (Including Former Church)				55°56′37″N 3°17′49″W	Category A	48977	Upload Photo
2 Piershill Terrace And 9-15 (Inclusive Numbers) Piershill Place				55°57′18″N 3°08′49″W	Category C(S)	49046	Upload Photo
5B Abbey Street, Abbeyhill Primary School, With Boundary Walls, Railings, Gatepiers And Janitor's House				55°57′20″N 3°08′54″W	Category C(S)	49049	Upload Photo
19 Abercorn Road, With Boundary Wall And Railings				55°57′09″N 3°09′05″W	Category C(S)	49050	Upload Photo
14 And 15 Earlston Place				55°57′26″N 3°10′00″W	Category C(S)	49053	Upload Photo
8-10 (Even Numbers) Easter Road				55°57′28″N 3°10′18″W	Category C(S)	49055	Upload Photo
35 London Road, Artisan Bar				55°57′27″N 3°10′10″W	Category C(S)	49057	Upload Photo
249-263 (Odd Nos) Canongate, And 43 New Street, Morocco Land Redevelopment				55°57′03″N 3°10′59″W	Category B	49076	Upload Photo
11-14 (Inclusive Nos) Antigua Street				55°57′29″N 3°11′06″W	Category B	49145	Upload Photo
10 Gayfield Square Including Railings				55°57′34″N 3°11′13″W	Category B	49147	Upload Photo
20A Inverleith Row Including Laboratories, Lecture Hall, Classrooms And Offices				55°58′00″N 3°12′20″W	Category B	49213	Upload Photo
Royal Botanic Garden, Inverleith Row, 1967 Greenhouse				55°57′59″N 3°12′29″W	Category A	49216	Upload another image
4 And 8 Gilmerton Road, Cottages At Good's Corner Including Boundary Wall				55°55′26″N 3°09′59″W	Category C(S)	49359	Upload Photo
545 Old Dalkeith Road, Edmonstone House South Gates And Lodge				55°54′48″N 3°07′30″W	Category B	49518	Upload Photo
Kinnear Road, Mackenzie House With Boundary Wall				55°58′05″N 3°13′00″W	Category B	49545	Upload Photo
Bridge Road, K6 Telephone Kiosk At Junction With Spylaw Street				55°54′26″N 3°15′32″W	Category B	49554	Upload Photo
18 Spylaw Bank Road, Hailes Brae, With Boundary Wall And Garage				55°54′35″N 3°15′31″W	Category C(S)	49567	Upload Photo
10-20 (Even Nos) Restalrig Drive, Former Kinloch Anderson Factory				55°57′35″N 3°08′58″W	Category C(S)	49596	Upload Photo
Fettes College, North Lodge, Gates, Gatepiers And Railings				55°58′01″N 3°13′31″W	Category B	49629	Upload Photo
13 Carlton Terrace Including Railings And Boundary Walls				55°57′24″N 3°10′27″W	Category A	49755	Upload another image
16 Carlton Terrace Including Railings And Boundary Walls				55°57′24″N 3°10′28″W	Category A	49758	Upload another image
6 Regent Terrace Including Railings And Boundary Walls				55°57′16″N 3°10′40″W	Category A	49769	Upload another image
8 Royal Terrace Including Railings And Boundary Walls				55°57′24″N 3°10′48″W	Category A	49806	Upload Photo
31 Royal Terrace Including Railings And Boundary Walls				55°57′24″N 3°10′36″W	Category A	49823	Upload Photo
32 Royal Terrace Including Railings And Boundary Walls				55°57′24″N 3°10′36″W	Category A	49824	Upload another image
33 Royal Terrace Including Railings And Boundary Walls				55°57′24″N 3°10′35″W	Category A	49825	Upload another image
36 Royal Terrace Including Railings And Boundary Walls				55°57′24″N 3°10′33″W	Category A	49828	Upload another image
10A Greenhill Park Including Garage, Pillar, Gates And Railings				55°56′00″N 3°12′25″W	Category B	49879	Upload Photo
62-66 (Even Nos) Warrender Park Road				55°56′17″N 3°11′43″W	Category C(S)	49895	Upload Photo
1 And 5 Main Street, Balerno, Dean Park Primary School Annexe				55°53′05″N 3°20′22″W	Category C(S)	49896	Upload Photo
1-21 (Odd Nos) Queen Charlotte Street And 1, 2 Maritime Street And 46 Water Street				55°58′27″N 3°10′09″W	Category B	49897	Upload Photo
47 And 48 Greenbank Drive				55°55′00″N 3°13′21″W	Category C(S)	48389	Upload Photo
Regent Road, K6 Telephone Kiosk				55°57′14″N 3°10′57″W	Category B	49151	Upload another image
Lanark Road West, Currie Library And Curriehill Primary School Including Boundary Walls And Railings				55°53′47″N 3°18′41″W	Category C(S)	50143	Upload Photo
48 The Pleasance, University Of Edinburgh, Sports Union				55°56′53″N 3°10′55″W	Category B	50194	Upload Photo
Glenogle Road, Glenogle Park (The Colonies), 1-8 (Inclusive) Glenogle House				55°57′43″N 3°12′23″W	Category B	50520	Upload Photo
Glenogle Road, Glenogle Park (The Colonies), 1-8 (Inclusive) Glenogle Terrace				55°57′44″N 3°12′23″W	Category B	50522	Upload Photo
Glenogle Road, Glenogle Park (The Colonies), 1-32 (Inclusive) Rintoul Place				55°57′40″N 3°12′37″W	Category B	50526	Upload Photo
Shore Road, Port Edgar, East And West Breakwaters				55°59′50″N 3°24′48″W	Category C(S)	50855	Upload Photo
Comiston Springs (Hare, Moubray, Fox, Sandglass And Peewit) Comiston Springs Avenue, Comiston View, Pentland Gardens, Oxgangs Loan And Oxgangs Green				55°54′41″N 3°12′56″W	Category B	27964	Upload Photo
51, 51A Lanark Road, Former Chalmers Memorial Hall				55°55′20″N 3°14′59″W	Category C(S)	51269	Upload Photo
23 Inverleith Terrace, St Colm's College Including Boundary Walls And Cast Iron Railing Panels				55°57′47″N 3°12′21″W	Category B	51308	Upload Photo
1-8 (Inclusive Numbers) Rothesay Mews				55°57′03″N 3°13′10″W	Category C(S)	51341	Upload another image
1-9 (Inclusive Numbers) Ravelston Terrace				55°57′11″N 3°13′31″W	Category C(S)	51395	Upload Photo
Mayfield Road, Edinburgh University Kings Buildings, Hudson Beare Lecture Theatre, Department Of Engineering, Including Hard Landscaping And Retaining Boundary Walls				55°55′21″N 3°10′15″W	Category B	51407	Upload Photo
Chambers Street, Lamp Standard				55°56′53″N 3°11′12″W	Category B	51549	Upload another image
23 Union Street, Edinburgh Printmakers				55°57′30″N 3°11′11″W	Category C(S)	51647	Upload Photo
2 Lufra Bank, Off Granton View, Lufra Cottage Including Walled Yard To S				55°58′44″N 3°13′07″W	Category C(S)	45658	Upload Photo
Dundas Castle, South Lodge, Including Gates, Gatepiers And Walls				55°57′58″N 3°24′09″W	Category B	45476	Upload Photo
West Scotland Street Lane				55°57′34″N 3°11′45″W	Category B	45526	Upload Photo
Dalmeny House, Leuchold, Including Boundary Wall And Outbuildings				55°59′37″N 3°21′48″W	Category B	45438	Upload Photo
1,2 Gladstone Place And 1,3 Restalrig Road With Railings				55°58′11″N 3°09′35″W	Category C(S)	44904	Upload Photo
21 And 23 Leven Street				55°56′29″N 3°12′13″W	Category B	44943	Upload Photo
Seafield Street, Eastern General Hospital, Chapel				55°58′07″N 3°08′44″W	Category C(S)	44951	Upload Photo
134 Corstorphine Road, Edinburgh Zoo (Royal Zoological Society Of Scotland) Members House Including Sundial				55°56′39″N 3°16′12″W	Category B	44750	Upload another image
2 Dovecot Road, Dovecot Studios Of The Edinburgh Tapestry Company				55°56′21″N 3°16′55″W	Category C(S)	44763	Upload Photo
Mcdonald Road, Former Generating Station Including Offices, Stack And Former Printing Works				55°57′52″N 3°11′07″W	Category B	44782	Upload Photo
392 Gorgie Road And 7 And 9 Alexander Drive, Former Roxy Cinema				55°56′10″N 3°14′29″W	Category C(S)	44618	Upload Photo
8-11 (Inclusive Nos) Ventnor Terrace, Including Boundary Walls				55°55′56″N 3°10′10″W	Category C(S)	44437	Upload Photo
18 West Savile Road, Tarquin House, Including Boundary Walls And Railings				55°55′45″N 3°10′30″W	Category B	44442	Upload Photo
1 Blacket Place, Including Former Carriage House And Boundary Walls				55°56′15″N 3°10′21″W	Category B	44199	Upload Photo
31 And 33 Blacket Place, Including Boundary Walls				55°56′07″N 3°10′23″W	Category C(S)	44201	Upload Photo
20 Gilmerton Road, Dovecot Cottage				55°55′22″N 3°09′53″W	Category C(S)	44215	Upload Photo
7 And 8 Gilmour Road, Including Boundary Walls				55°55′46″N 3°10′17″W	Category C(S)	44216	Upload Photo
12 And 14 Mayfield Terrace, Including Boundary Walls				55°56′05″N 3°10′21″W	Category C(S)	44235	Upload Photo
Torphichen Street, Former Torphichen Street Education Centre, Including Janitor's House, Gates, Gatepiers, Boundary Walls And Railings				55°56′50″N 3°12′45″W	Category B	43888	Upload Photo
4 And 4B Barnton Avenue West, Including Boundary Railings And Gatepiers				55°57′59″N 3°18′19″W	Category C(S)	43930	Upload Photo
10 And 12 Brae Park Road, Including Boundary Wall				55°57′57″N 3°18′52″W	Category C(S)	43932	Upload Photo
Cammo Road, Cammo Estate, Gate Lodge				55°57′35″N 3°19′09″W	Category B	43936	Upload Photo
2 Great Michael Rise And 29, 30 And 33 Annfield				55°58′48″N 3°11′30″W	Category B	43699	Upload Photo
16, 18 And 20 Newhaven Main Street				55°58′49″N 3°11′37″W	Category C(S)	43705	Upload Photo
216 And 218 Newhaven Road And 55 Hawthornvale, Including Boundary Wall				55°58′42″N 3°11′35″W	Category C(S)	43717	Upload Photo
12 Pier Place And 56 And 58 Newhaven Main Street				55°58′50″N 3°11′49″W	Category C(S)	43723	Upload Photo
Pier Place, Police Box				55°58′51″N 3°11′42″W	Category B	43726	Upload Photo
Queen Street Central Gardens, Doric Pavilion				55°57′19″N 3°11′55″W	Category A	43498	Upload another image
11 And 13 Hill Street				55°57′13″N 3°12′08″W	Category A	43297	Upload Photo
10 Hill Street				55°57′12″N 3°12′07″W	Category A	43300	Upload Photo
12 Hill Street				55°57′12″N 3°12′08″W	Category A	43301	Upload Photo
72 And 73 Princes Street				55°57′09″N 3°11′46″W	Category B	43317	Upload Photo
133 Rose Street				55°57′06″N 3°12′14″W	Category C(S)	43332	Upload Photo
163-167 (Odd Nos) Rose Street				55°57′05″N 3°12′19″W	Category B	43335	Upload another image
184-188 (Even Nos) Rose Street				55°57′05″N 3°12′16″W	Category B	43342	Upload Photo
47 Thistle Street And 19 North West Thistle Street Lane				55°57′15″N 3°11′57″W	Category B	43358	Upload Photo
54-58 Thistle Street With Warehouses In Sw Thistle Street Lane				55°57′14″N 3°11′58″W	Category B	43364	Upload Photo
Frogston Road East, Mortonhall House, Walled Garden				55°54′12″N 3°11′12″W	Category C(S)	43240	Upload Photo
280 Gilmerton Road, Liberton Northfield Parish Church And Halls, Walls And Gatepiers				55°55′02″N 3°09′12″W	Category B	43241	Upload Photo
Gilmerton, 4B Drum Street, Community Centre, With Boundary Walls And Railings				55°54′21″N 3°08′03″W	Category B	43255	Upload Photo
Gilmerton, Ferniehill Drive, The Drum, North Gatepiers				55°54′37″N 3°07′33″W	Category B	43258	Upload Photo
27 George Street				55°57′14″N 3°11′49″W	Category B	43286	Upload Photo
21-25 (Odd Nos) Causewayside				55°56′19″N 3°10′53″W	Category B	43143	Upload another image
169-179 (Odd Nos) Causewayside, Wight's Place				55°56′09″N 3°10′47″W	Category B	43146	Upload Photo
75-77 (Inclusive Nos) Dalkeith Road				55°56′14″N 3°10′14″W	Category C(S)	43149	Upload Photo
44 Minto Street Including Gatepiers And Boundary Walls				55°56′11″N 3°10′38″W	Category C(S)	43159	Upload Photo
13, Priestfield Road				55°56′10″N 3°09′58″W	Category C(S)	43166	Upload Photo

== Key ==
The scheme for classifying buildings in Scotland is:

- Category A: "buildings of national or international importance, either architectural or historic; or fine, little-altered examples of some particular period, style or building type."
- Category B: "buildings of regional or more than local importance; or major examples of some particular period, style or building type, which may have been altered."
- Category C: "buildings of local importance; lesser examples of any period, style, or building type, as originally constructed or moderately altered; and simple traditional buildings which group well with other listed buildings."

In March 2016 there were 47,288 listed buildings in Scotland. Of these, 8% were Category A, and 50% were Category B, with the remaining 42% being Category C.

== See also ==
- List of listed buildings in Edinburgh
