= George Grubb =

British politician (1935–2018)

George Darlington Wilson Grubb (5 December 1935 – 10 June 2018) was a Scottish politician who served as the Lord Provost and ex officio Lord-Lieutenant of Edinburgh from May 2007 until May 2012. He was also a Liberal Democrat councillor of the City of Edinburgh Council for Almond ward. In 2012 he stood down as a councillor, at the end of his five-year term as Lord Provost.

He was also a Church of Scotland minister at Craigsbank Parish Church in Corstorphine, Edinburgh from 1971 until his retirement in 2001.

== Early life ==
George Grubb was born in Edinburgh (in 1935) and was educated at James Gillespie's Boys School, Edinburgh, the Royal High School, Edinburgh, the Open University (BA, 1974 and BPhil, 1983), the University of Edinburgh (BD, 1978) and San Francisco Theological Seminary (DMin, 1993). He was ordained a minister by the Methodist Church in Stoke-on-Trent in 1962, later transferring to the Church of Scotland. From 1962 until 1970 he served as a Chaplain in the Royal Air Force. He also ministered in Zambia and Malawi.

George once called for the monarchy to be scrapped and in 1998 criticised the Church of Scotland for being out of touch, saying that the only growth the Kirk was looking for was in bureaucracy.

== Council career ==
George Grubb was first elected to the council in 1999 for the ward of Queensferry. He retained his seat in 2003 and in 2007 was one of three councillors elected for the new multi-member ward of Almond. He is a member of the Liberal Democrats and was chairperson of the party's group on the council from 2000 to 2007.

George Grubb was chosen as Lord Provost of Edinburgh on 17 May 2007, after the Liberal Democrats became the largest party on the council after the 2007 council elections. He noted in his remarks upon assuming the chair that it was Ascension Day. The Liberal Democrats selected him for the post after fellow councillor Marilyne MacLaren withdrew from contention and therefore became the first Liberal Democrat Lord Provost of Edinburgh. In 2012 his five-year term ended, and Grubb stood down as a councillor.

== Personal life ==
Grubb married Elizabeth Grant and they had two children; one son and a daughter.

Preceded by Lesley Hinds	Lord Provost of Edinburgh; 2007–2012	Succeeded by Donald Wilson
