= Sibilla Hutton =

Scottish milliner and shopkeeper (d.1808)

- Born: Poss. Dalkeith
- Died: 1808; Edinburgh
- Occupation: milliner

Sibilla "Sibbie" Hutton (died 1808) was a Scottish milliner and shopkeeper in 18th century Edinburgh. She became well known for operating a millinery in what today is Edinburgh City Chambers. She was a target of caricature for her fashion sense and "stout"ness.

== Life ==
Hutton was known as Sibbie. The place and date of her birth is unknown but her parents had married on 7 November 1742. Her father was the Reverend William Hutton and he was a dissenter in Dalkeith. Her mother was also a Sibella and she had been born Sibella Tunnock and her family were from Edinburgh.

Sibbie Hutton must have been a well known character as she is included when caricaturist John Kay needs to fill a coach with well known figures for one cartoon and her weight is a source of humour when she is included in another caricature showing her talking to private banker Mr Robert Johnstone, who is also "stout".

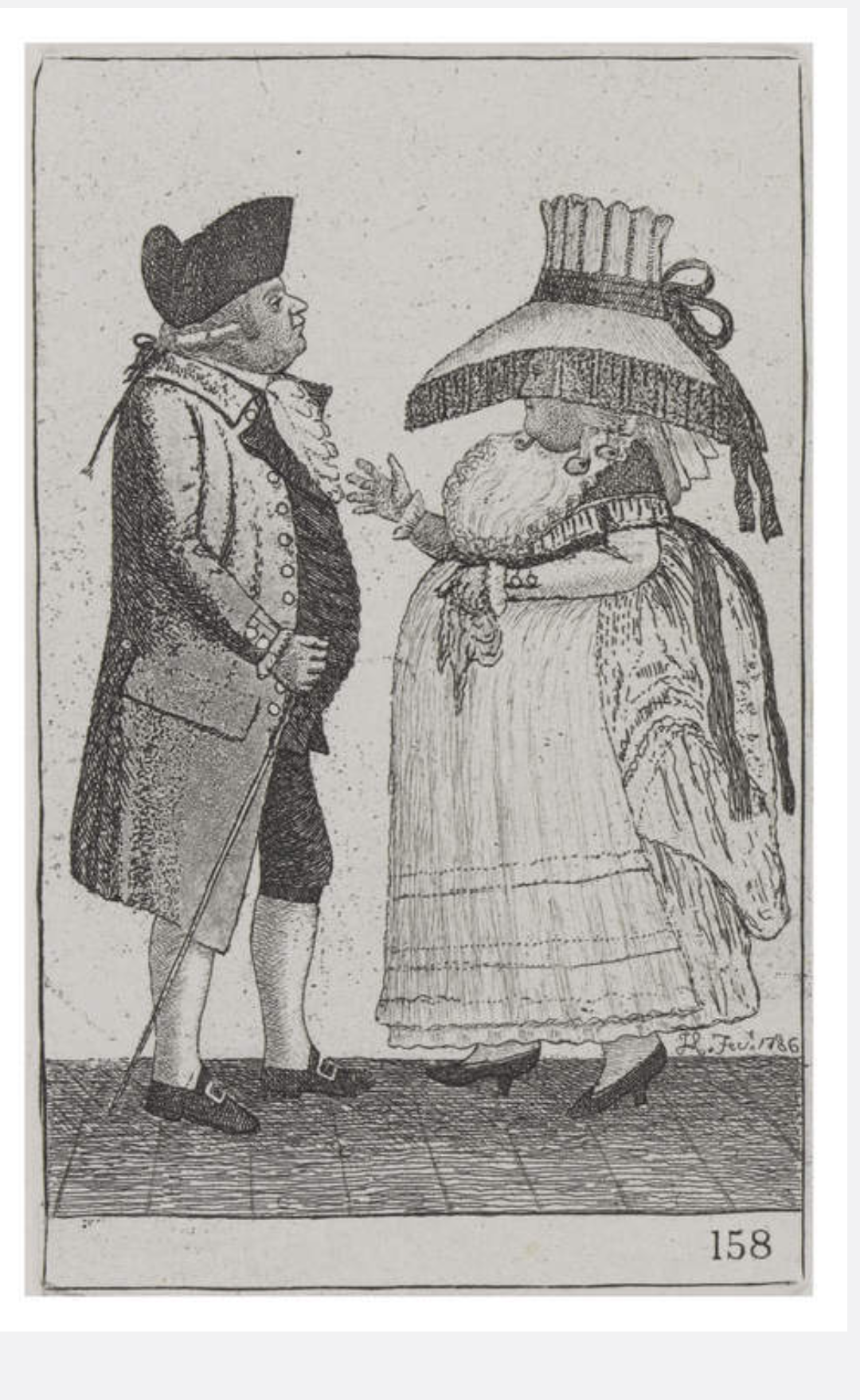
Robert Johnston and Sibilla Hutton caricature by John Kay

When John Kay created his "Original Portrait book" then Sibella appears in the second volume. The accompanying text describes her relationship with her father. According to the account he was worried that she was too obsessed with fashion, but Sibella doesn't care. She is said to have worn huge hats, ignoring her father's criticism, until the moment when they became unfashionable. However Kay never managed to publish his book. He did have difficulty with subjects objecting. It was said that many of his 900 engraving plates were bought by the subject of the plate to prevent publication. Kay's book was not published until about 1838. Her business was based in the impressive Royal Exchange buildings in Edinburgh where customers could visit and see her priced goods. Hutton visited London to buy the latest material and to see the latest fashions.

In 1781 Sibilla came into conflict with the Edinburgh authorities. She had created an extra bay window by removing a staircase. She had done this without first seeking permission and she received a demand that she restore her property to its original condition. She was told that she would face a fine of £100 if she failed to comply.

In 1790 she established her business in London. This business in time was managed by her sister, Mrs Nellie Kidd, who had a millinery and haberdashery business in Princes Street in Edinburgh

Hutton died in Edinburgh in 1808 although the exact day isn't recorded.
