= Edinburgh North and Leith (UK Parliament constituency) =

UK Parliament constituency (since 1997)

Coordinates: 55°58′09″N 3°11′59″W

- Burgh constituency for the House of Commons
- Interactive map of current boundaries
- Location of Edinburgh North and Leith within Scotland
- Subdivision: City of Edinburgh
- Electorate: 76,770 (March 2020)
- Major settlements: Edinburgh (part), Leith

Current constituency
- Created: 1997
- Member of Parliament: Tracy Gilbert (Labour)
- Created from: Edinburgh Leith

Edinburgh North and Leith is a constituency of the House of Commons of the Parliament of the United Kingdom (at Westminster), first used in the 1997 general election. It elects one Member of Parliament (MP) by the first past the post system of election and has been represented since 2024 by Tracy Gilbert of Scottish Labour.

In 1999, a Scottish Parliament constituency was created with the same name and boundaries. See Edinburgh North and Leith (Scottish Parliament constituency). The boundaries of the Westminster constituency were altered, however, in 2005, and the Scottish Parliament constituency retained the older boundaries until 2011. Since then, the seat has mainly been split between the Edinburgh Northern and Leith and Edinburgh Central constituencies at Holyrood, with a small area also located in Edinburgh Western.

At the 2014 Scottish independence referendum, the constituency returned an above average No vote; 60% voted for Scotland to stay in the United Kingdom, while 40% voted Yes to independence. At the 2016 referendum on UK membership of the European Union, the constituency voted to Remain by 78.2%. This constituency was the seventh-highest supporter of a Remain vote.

== Constituency profile ==
The constituency is urbanised, affluent and left-leaning, and covers several northern communities of the city, as well as most of the former burgh of Leith, which controversially amalgamated with the City of Edinburgh in 1920. It has the highest proportion of residents living in tenements and flats of any parliamentary constituency in the United Kingdom, and a relatively high proportion of university graduates. It includes a mix of leafy, expensive residential areas in the South and West of the constituency and densely populated areas nearer to Leith with more young professionals and students, as well as older residents whose families have lived there during several previous generations.

It also includes Calton Hill, the shops and offices on the northern side of Princes Street, Bute House, the official residence of the First Minister of Scotland, St Mary's Episcopal Cathedral, the Edinburgh Playhouse, the Edinburgh Waterfront, the stretch of the Water of Leith from Dean Village to Leith Harbour, the Royal Botanical Gardens, the Western General Hospital and the notable private schools.

== Boundaries ==
When created in 1997, Edinburgh North and Leith was largely a replacement for the Edinburgh Leith constituency, and was one of six constituencies covering the City of Edinburgh council area. One of those six, Edinburgh East and Musselburgh straddled the boundary with the East Lothian council area to take in Musselburgh.

1997–2005: The City of Edinburgh wards of Broughton, Calton, Granton, Harbour, Lorne, New Town, Newhaven, Pilton, Stockbridge and Trinity.

2005–2024: Under the Fifth Review of UK Parliament constituencies, constituency boundaries in Scotland were revised for the 2005 election. The number of constituencies within the city was reduced from six to five, each now entirely within the city area, and Musselburgh was reunited with the remainder of East Lothian. The revised Edinburgh North and Leith constituency included the whole of the existing one, but also took in the Dean ward from Edinburgh Central and Craigleith ward from Edinburgh West.

Further to the Local Governance (Scotland) Act 2004, the ward structure in the City of Edinburgh was changed. Consequently, from 2007, the constituency comprised parts of the City of Edinburgh wards of Leith, Leith Walk, Forth, Inverleith and City Centre. A further revision to ward boundaries in 2017 resulted in the whole of the Forth ward and a small part of the Corstorphine/Murrayfield ward now being within the constituency boundaries.

2024–present: Further to the 2023 review of Westminster constituencies which came into effect for the 2024 general election, the boundary with the neighbouring constituency of Edinburgh West was revised. The part in the Corstorphine/Murrayfield ward was transferred to Edinburgh West, along with a further part of the Inverleith ward. To partly compensate, the eastern-most part of the Almond ward was moved in the opposite direction. The constituency now comprises the following wards or part wards of the City of Edinburgh:

- A small part of Almond ward, including the Muirhouse area;
- the whole of Forth ward;
- eastern parts of Inverleith ward, comprising approximately half its electorate;
- northern parts of City Centre ward, including New Town and Greenside; and
- most of Leith and Leith Walk wards.

== Members of Parliament ==
| Election | Member | Party |
|---|---|---|
| 1997 | Malcolm Chisholm | Labour |
| 2001 | Mark Lazarowicz | Labour Co-op |
| 2015 | Deidre Brock | SNP |
| 2024 | Tracy Gilbert | Labour |

== Election results ==
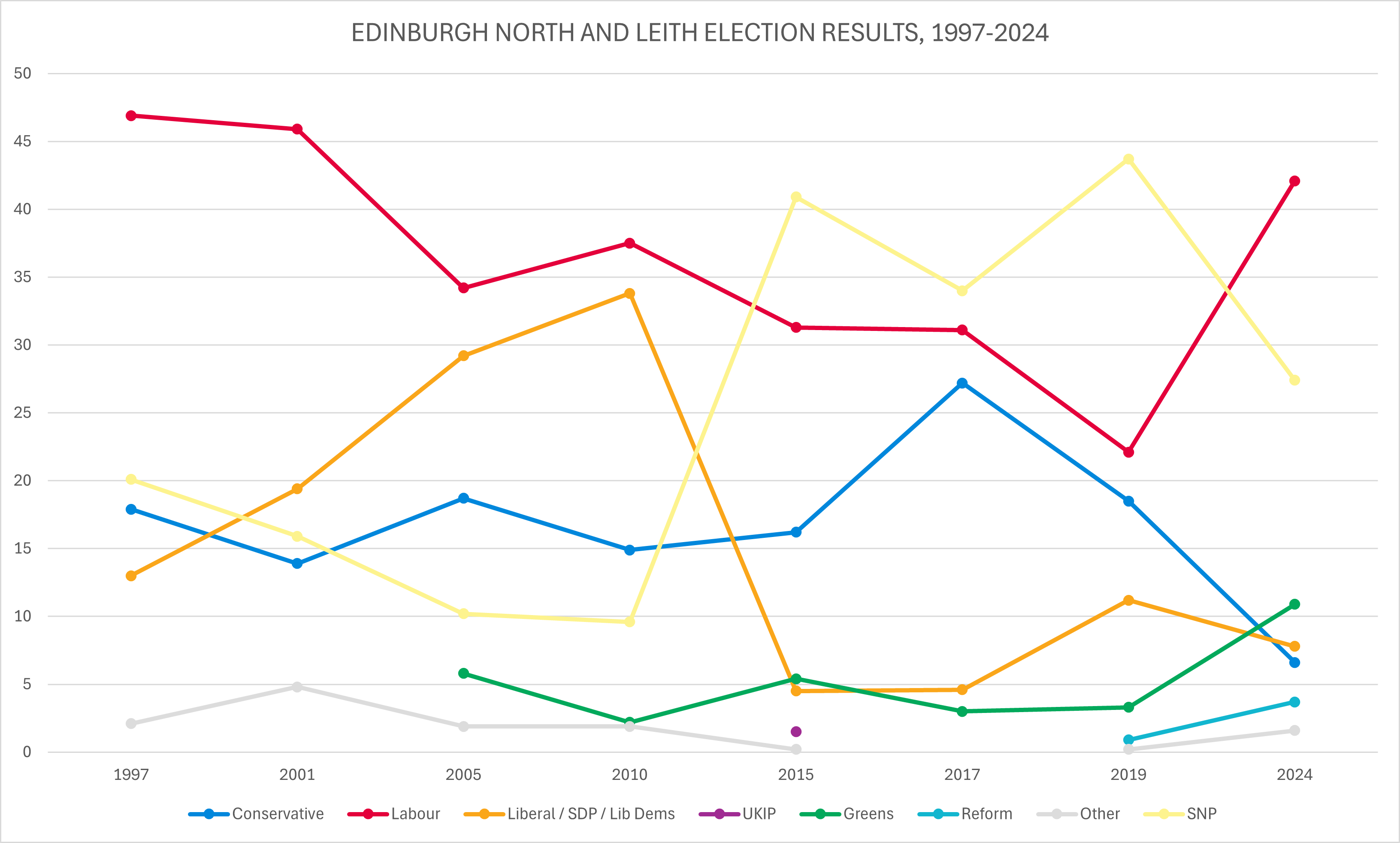
Election results 1997-2024

=== Elections in the 2020s ===
General election 2024: Edinburgh North and Leith
| Party | Candidate | Votes | % | ±% |
|---|---|---|---|---|
| Labour | Tracy Gilbert | 20,805 | 42.1 | +20.4 |
| SNP | Deidre Brock | 13,537 | 27.4 | −16.4 |
| Green | Kayleigh O'Neill | 5,417 | 10.9 | +7.6 |
| Liberal Democrats | Mike Andersen | 3,879 | 7.8 | −4.7 |
| Conservative | Joanna Mowat | 3,254 | 6.6 | −11.0 |
| Reform | Alan Melville | 1,818 | 3.7 | +2.8 |
| Socialist Labour | David Jacobsen | 227 | 0.5 | N/A |
| Scottish Family | Niel Deepnarain | 210 | 0.4 | N/A |
| Communist | Richard Shillcock | 189 | 0.4 | N/A |
| Independent | Caroline Waterloo | 139 | 0.3 | N/A |
| Majority | | 7,268 | 14.7 | N/A |
| Turnout | | 49,475 | 63.1 | −9.8 |
| Registered electors | | 78,411 | | |
| Labour gain from SNP | | Swing | +18.4 | |

=== Elections in the 2010s ===
2019 notional result (Note: Estimate of the 2019 general election result as if the revised boundaries recommended under the 2023 boundary review were in place)
| Party | Vote | % |
|---|---|---|
| SNP | 25,773 | 43.8 |
| Labour | 12,790 | 21.7 |
| Conservative | 10,362 | 17.6 |
| Liberal Democrats | 7,364 | 12.5 |
| Scottish Greens | 1,920 | 3.3 |
| Brexit Party | 508 | 0.9 |
| Renew | 138 | 0.2 |
| Majority | 12,983 | 22.1 |
| Turnout | 58,855 | 76.7 |
| Electorate | 76,770 | |

General election 2019: Edinburgh North and Leith
| Party | Candidate | Votes | % | ±% |
|---|---|---|---|---|
| SNP | Deidre Brock | 25,925 | 43.7 | +9.7 |
| Labour Co-op | Gordon Munro | 13,117 | 22.1 | −9.0 |
| Conservative | Iain McGill | 11,000 | 18.5 | −8.7 |
| Liberal Democrats | Bruce Wilson | 6,635 | 11.2 | +6.6 |
| Green | Steve Burgess | 1,971 | 3.3 | +0.3 |
| Brexit Party | Robert Speirs | 558 | 0.9 | New |
| Renew | Heather Astbury | 138 | 0.2 | New |
| Majority | | 12,808 | 21.6 | +18.7 |
| Turnout | | 59,334 | 73.0 | +1.8 |
| SNP hold | | Swing | +9.4 | |

General election 2017: Edinburgh North and Leith
| Party | Candidate | Votes | % | ±% |
|---|---|---|---|---|
| SNP | Deidre Brock | 19,243 | 34.0 | −6.9 |
| Labour Co-op | Gordon Munro | 17,618 | 31.1 | −0.2 |
| Conservative | Iain McGill | 15,385 | 27.2 | +11.0 |
| Liberal Democrats | Martin Veart | 2,579 | 4.6 | +0.1 |
| Green | Lorna Slater | 1,727 | 3.0 | −2.4 |
| Majority | | 1,625 | 2.9 | −6.7 |
| Turnout | | 56,552 | 71.2 | −0.5 |
| SNP hold | | Swing | −3.3 | |

General election 2015: Edinburgh North and Leith
| Party | Candidate | Votes | % | ±% |
|---|---|---|---|---|
| SNP | Deidre Brock | 23,742 | 40.9 | +31.3 |
| Labour Co-op | Mark Lazarowicz | 18,145 | 31.3 | −6.2 |
| Conservative | Iain McGill | 9,378 | 16.2 | +1.3 |
| Green | Sarah Beattie-Smith | 3,140 | 5.4 | +3.2 |
| Liberal Democrats | Martin Veart | 2,634 | 4.5 | −29.3 |
| UKIP | Alan Melville | 847 | 1.5 | New |
| Left Unity (TUSC) | Bruce Whitehead | 122 | 0.2 | −0.3 |
| Majority | | 5,597 | 9.6 | N/A |
| Turnout | | 58,008 | 71.7 | +3.3 |
| SNP gain from Labour Co-op | | Swing | +18.7 | |

General election 2010: Edinburgh North and Leith
| Party | Candidate | Votes | % | ±% |
|---|---|---|---|---|
| Labour Co-op | Mark Lazarowicz | 17,740 | 37.5 | +3.3 |
| Liberal Democrats | Kevin Lang | 16,016 | 33.8 | +4.6 |
| Conservative | Iain McGill | 7,079 | 14.9 | −3.8 |
| SNP | Calum Cashley | 4,568 | 9.6 | −0.6 |
| Green | Kate Joester | 1,062 | 2.2 | −3.6 |
| Liberal | John Hein | 389 | 0.8 | N/A |
| TUSC | Willie Black | 233 | 0.5 | N/A |
| Socialist Labour | David Jacobsen | 141 | 0.3 | New |
| Independent | Cameron James MacIntyre | 128 | 0.3 | New |
| Majority | | 1,724 | 3.7 | −1.3 |
| Turnout | | 47,356 | 68.4 | +5.7 |
| Labour Co-op hold | | Swing | −0.7 | |

=== Elections in the 2000s ===
General election 2005: Edinburgh North and Leith
| Party | Candidate | Votes | % | ±% |
|---|---|---|---|---|
| Labour Co-op | Mark Lazarowicz | 14,597 | 34.2 | −7.7 |
| Liberal Democrats | Mike Crockart | 12,444 | 29.2 | +8.9 |
| Conservative | Iain Whyte | 7,969 | 18.7 | ±0.0 |
| SNP | Davie Hutchison | 4,344 | 10.2 | −4.2 |
| Green | Mark Sydenham | 2,482 | 5.8 | New |
| Scottish Socialist | Bill Scott | 804 | 1.9 | −1.7 |
| Majority | | 2,153 | 5.0 | −21.5 |
| Turnout | | 42,640 | 62.7 | +8.8 |
| Labour Co-op hold | | Swing | −8.3 | |

General election 2001: Edinburgh North and Leith
| Party | Candidate | Votes | % | ±% |
|---|---|---|---|---|
| Labour Co-op | Mark Lazarowicz | 15,271 | 45.9 | −1.0 |
| Liberal Democrats | Sebastian Tombs | 6,454 | 19.4 | +6.4 |
| SNP | Kaukab Stewart | 5,290 | 15.9 | −4.2 |
| Conservative | Iain Mitchell | 4,626 | 13.9 | −4.0 |
| Scottish Socialist | Catriona Grant | 1,334 | 4.0 | +3.2 |
| Socialist Labour | Don Jacobsen | 259 | 0.8 | New |
| Majority | | 8,817 | 26.5 | −0.3 |
| Turnout | | 33,234 | 53.0 | −13.5 |
| Labour Co-op hold | | Swing | | |

=== Elections in the 1990s ===
General election 1997: Edinburgh North and Leith
| Party | Candidate | Votes | % | ±% |
|---|---|---|---|---|
| Labour | Malcolm Chisholm | 19,209 | 46.9 | |
| SNP | Anne Dana | 8,231 | 20.1 | |
| Conservative | Ewen Stewart | 7,312 | 17.9 | |
| Liberal Democrats | Hillary Campbell | 5,335 | 13.0 | |
| Referendum | Sandy Graham | 441 | 1.1 | |
| Scottish Socialist | Gavin Browne | 320 | 0.8 | |
| Natural Law | Paul Douglas-Reid | 97 | 0.2 | |
| Majority | | 10,978 | 26.8 | |
| Turnout | | 40,945 | 66.5 | |
| Labour win (new seat) | | | | |

== See also ==
- Politics of Edinburgh
