= 1977 City of Edinburgh District Council election =

1977 Scottish local government election

1977 City of Edinburgh Council election
← 1974	3 May 1977	1980 →

All 64 seats to Edinburgh City Council 33 seats needed for a majority
	First party	Second party	Third party
Party	Conservative	Labour	SNP
Last election	30	29	1
Seats won	34	23	5
Seat change	▲4	▼6	▲4
Popular vote	73,159	43,459	31,525
Percentage	44.8%	26.6%	19.3%
Swing	▲3.8%	▼9.4%	▲12.6%
	Fourth party	Fifth party
Party	Liberal	Independent
Last election	3	1
Seats won	1	1
Seat change	▼2	0
Popular vote	12,873	1,703
Percentage	7.9%	1.0%
Swing	▼5.6%	▼0.7%
Council control before election
No overall control
Council control after election
Conservative

Elections for the City of Edinburgh District Council took place on 3 May 1977, alongside elections to the councils of Scotland's various other districts. These were the second election to the City of Edinburgh District Council. Conservatives won a majority with 34 of the Council's 64 seats. Across Scotland the elections saw the Conservatives and SNP make gains, while Labour lost seats. The Glasgow Herald said the Conservatives gaining control of Edinburgh District Council "crowned" what was "a night of considerable success" for the party.

Writing in The Glasgow Herald, journalist Tom McConnell stated that "it was a disappointing night" for the SNP in Edinburgh, as while the party came close to taking several seats from Labour, in the end they managed to gain just four seats and also failed to trouble the Conservatives. He also blamed the Liberal result, which saw the party lose two of the three seats they had held, on voters reacting negatively to the recent Lib-Lab pact.

== Aggregate results ==
City of Edinburgh District Council election, 1977
Party	Seats	Gains	Losses	Net gain/loss	Seats %	Votes %	Votes	+/−
Conservative	34			▲4	53.1	44.8	73,159	▲3.8
Labour	23			▼6	35.9	26.6	43,459	▼9.4
SNP	5			▲4	7.8	19.3	31,525	▲12.6
Liberal	1			▼2	1.6	7.9	12,873	▼5.6
Independent	1			0	1.6	1.0	1,703	▼0.7
Communist	0			0	0.0	0.1	238	▼0.1
Independent Labour	0			0	0.0	0.1	228	New
Scottish Socialist	0			0	0.0	0.1	170	New

== Ward results ==
Ward 1: Holyrood
Party	Candidate	Votes	%
Labour	B Rutherford (Incumbent)	965	
SNP	A. Dear	531	
Conservative	T. Davies	518	
Majority		454	
Turnout			

Ward 2: Meadows
Party	Candidate	Votes	%
Labour	R. Canns (Incumbent)	708	
Conservative	J. Boal	663	
SNP	J. Mitchell	383	
Liberal	J. R. Wallace	127	
Majority		45	
Turnout			

Ward 3: Lochrin
Party	Candidate	Votes	%
Conservative	W. K. Macfarlane (Incumbent)	1,253	
Labour	G. I. Greene	674	
Majority		579	
Turnout			

Ward 4: Tron
Party	Candidate	Votes	%
Labour	J. A. Mitchell	675	
SNP	C. A. McAdam	462	
Conservative	P. McCormack	419	
Majority		213	
Turnout			

Ward 5: Dalry
Party	Candidate	Votes	%
SNP	May Moss	669	
Labour	A. Milne	558	
Conservative	P. M. Smaill	434	
Dalry Peoples' Candidate	A. McCue	360	
Majority		81	
Turnout			
SNP gain from Labour			

Ward 6: Tynecastle
Party	Candidate	Votes	%
Labour	Elizabeth R. Mackenzie (Incumbent)	592	
Conservative	Isabella I. R. Jones	546	
SNP	Jennifer M. Law	418	
Majority		46	
Turnout			

Ward 7: Moat
Party	Candidate	Votes	%
Labour	J. C. Wilson	651	
SNP	Joan Crawford	608	
Conservative	K. Alexander	489	
Liberal	T. B. Aitkin	489	
Independent Labour	D. Swanson	228	
Majority		43	
Turnout			

Ward 8: Polworth
Party	Candidate	Votes	%
Liberal	J. G. Gray (Incumbent)	985	
Labour	Joan F. W. Fleming	676	
Conservative	J. Taylor	550	
Majority		409	
Turnout			

Ward 9: Churchill
Party	Candidate	Votes	%
Conservative	K. G. Ferguson	1,122	
Liberal	Elizabeth C. Coates	633	
Labour	D. D. Johnston	261	
Majority		489	
Turnout			

Ward 10: Braid
Party	Candidate	Votes	%
Conservative	Nancy H. Mansbridge (Incumbent)	2,735	
Liberal	B.A. Ritchie	732	
Labour	D. D. Johnston	293	
Majority		2,003	
Turnout			

Ward 11: Sciennes
Party	Candidate	Votes	%
Conservative	E. M. Kean (Incumbent)	1,385	
Liberal	J. G. Hamilton	535	
Labour	D. J. Mackenzie	333	
Majority		850	
Turnout			

Ward 12: Marchmont
Party	Candidate	Votes	%
Conservative	R. Brereton (Incumbent)	1,611	
Liberal	M. G. Falchikov	892	
Labour	R. Imrie	318	
Communist	Carol Downs	64	
Majority		719	
Turnout			

Ward 13: Prestonfield
Party	Candidate	Votes	%
Conservative	D. Ritchie (Incumbent)	1,717	
Labour	Jessie Rogan	951	
SNP	D. R. L. Stewart	696	
Majority		766	
Turnout			

Ward 14: Mayfield
Party	Candidate	Votes	%
Conservative	Margaret E. S. Houston (Incumbent)	1,849	
Labour	R. A. P. Worral	574	
Majority		1,275	
Turnout			

Ward 15: Inch
Party	Candidate	Votes	%
Labour	J. C. Campbell (Incumbent)	1,629	
SNP	A. McCallum	1,077	
Conservative	Caroline Peploe	531	
Majority		552	
Turnout			

Ward 16: Gilmerton
Party	Candidate	Votes	%
Labour	R.M. Lonie (Incumbent)	1,432	
SNP	C. C. Laing	619	
Conservative	J. M. O. Lewis	612	
Majority		813	
Turnout			

Ward 17: Alnwickhill
Party	Candidate	Votes	%
Conservative	A. P. Metcalfe (Incumbent)	1,342	
Labour	D. A. Graham	860	
Liberal	W. D. McLaren	274	
Majority		482	
Turnout			

Ward 18: Kaimes
Party	Candidate	Votes	%
Labour	B. R. MacKenzie (Incumbent)	1,115	
Conservative	H. W. De Burgh	955	
SNP	A. G. Symington	820	
Majority		160	
Turnout			

Ward 19: Merchiston
Party	Candidate	Votes	%
Conservative	J. L. Walls	1,600	
Liberal	J. F. Lawrie	1,430	
Labour	T. J. H. Fenton	300	
Majority		170	
Turnout			
Conservative gain from Liberal			

Ward 20: Alnwickhill
Party	Candidate	Votes	%
Conservative	J. D. Maclennen (Incumbent)	2,574	
SNP	Shena R. Cole	395	
Liberal	L. F. Nichols	338	
Labour	W. Crosbie	234	
Majority		2,179	
Turnout			

Ward 21: Fairmilehead
Party	Candidate	Votes	%
Conservative	B. A. Meek (Incumbent)	2,795	
SNP	R. O. Socle	1,013	
Labour	F. R. N. Dickson	794	
Majority		1,782	
Turnout			

Ward 22: Firrhill
Party	Candidate	Votes	%
Labour	Gerturde Batton (Incumbent)	1,002	
Conservative	T. Fontaine	863	
SNP	C. D. Bisset	529	
Majority		139	
Turnout			

Ward 23: Slighthill
Party	Candidate	Votes	%
Labour	F. Milligan (Incumbent)	1,293	
SNP	P. A. McGill	1,066	
Conservative	J. D. Train	781	
Majority		227	
Turnout			

Ward 24: Stenhouse
Party	Candidate	Votes	%
Labour	D. F. Renton (Incumbent)	1,619	
SNP	K. Mackintosh	1,271	
Conservative	J. D. N. Iriving	719	
Majority		348	
Turnout			

Ward 25: Slateford
Party	Candidate	Votes	%
Conservative	Elizabeth Alves (Incumbent)	1,024	
SNP	A. Westwood	700	
Labour	J. J. F. Henderson	510	
Majority		324	
Turnout			

Ward 26: Hailes
Party	Candidate	Votes	%
SNP	N. R. MacCallum	1,696	
Labour	J. H. McKay	1,342	
Conservative	D. A. Robertson	673	
Majority		354	
Turnout			
SNP gain from Labour			

Ward 27: Pilton
Party	Candidate	Votes	%
SNP	J. B. Carson	793	
Labour	R. G. D. Dalgleish	788	
Liberal	W. H. Bailey	154	
Majority		5	
Turnout			
SNP gain from Labour			

Ward 28: Muirhouse
Party	Candidate	Votes	%
Labour	Eleanor T. McLaughlin (Incumbent)	1,029	
SNP	H. C. Kidd	836	
Majority		193	
Turnout			

Ward 29: Craigsbank
Party	Candidate	Votes	%
Conservative	J. G. R. Crombie (Incumbent)	1,513	
Liberal	T. M. Frew	673	
Labour	J. A. Anderson	132	
Majority		840	
Turnout			

Ward 30: Carrickknowe
Party	Candidate	Votes	%
Conservative	I. G.. Anderson	1,150	
Liberal	Joyce Shein (Incumbent)	1,079	
SNP	J.W. Donaldson	662	
Labour	W. Coupar	466	
Majority		71	
Turnout			
Conservative gain from Liberal			

Ward 31: Corstorphine
Party	Candidate	Votes	%
Conservative	A. J. MacLernan (Incumbent)	1,441	
Liberal	D. C. E. Gorrie	1,010	
Labour	A. Howden	200	
Majority		431	
Turnout			

Ward 32: Drumbrae
Party	Candidate	Votes	%
SNP	N. M. Irons	1,441	
Conservative	I. G. Mitchell	824	
Labour	G. A. Munro	751	
Majority		407	
Turnout			
SNP gain from Labour			

Ward 33: Murrayfield
Party	Candidate	Votes	%
Conservative	Rosemary Macarthur	2,298	
Liberal	Veronica J. Crerar	1,010	
Labour	W. D. Wood	409	
Majority		1,868	
Turnout			

Ward 34: Blackhall
Party	Candidate	Votes	%
Conservative	R. M. Knox (Incumbent)	1,953	
Labour	A. Foggie	177	
Majority		1,776	
Turnout			
