= Tracy Gilbert =

British politician

Tracy Gilbert MP
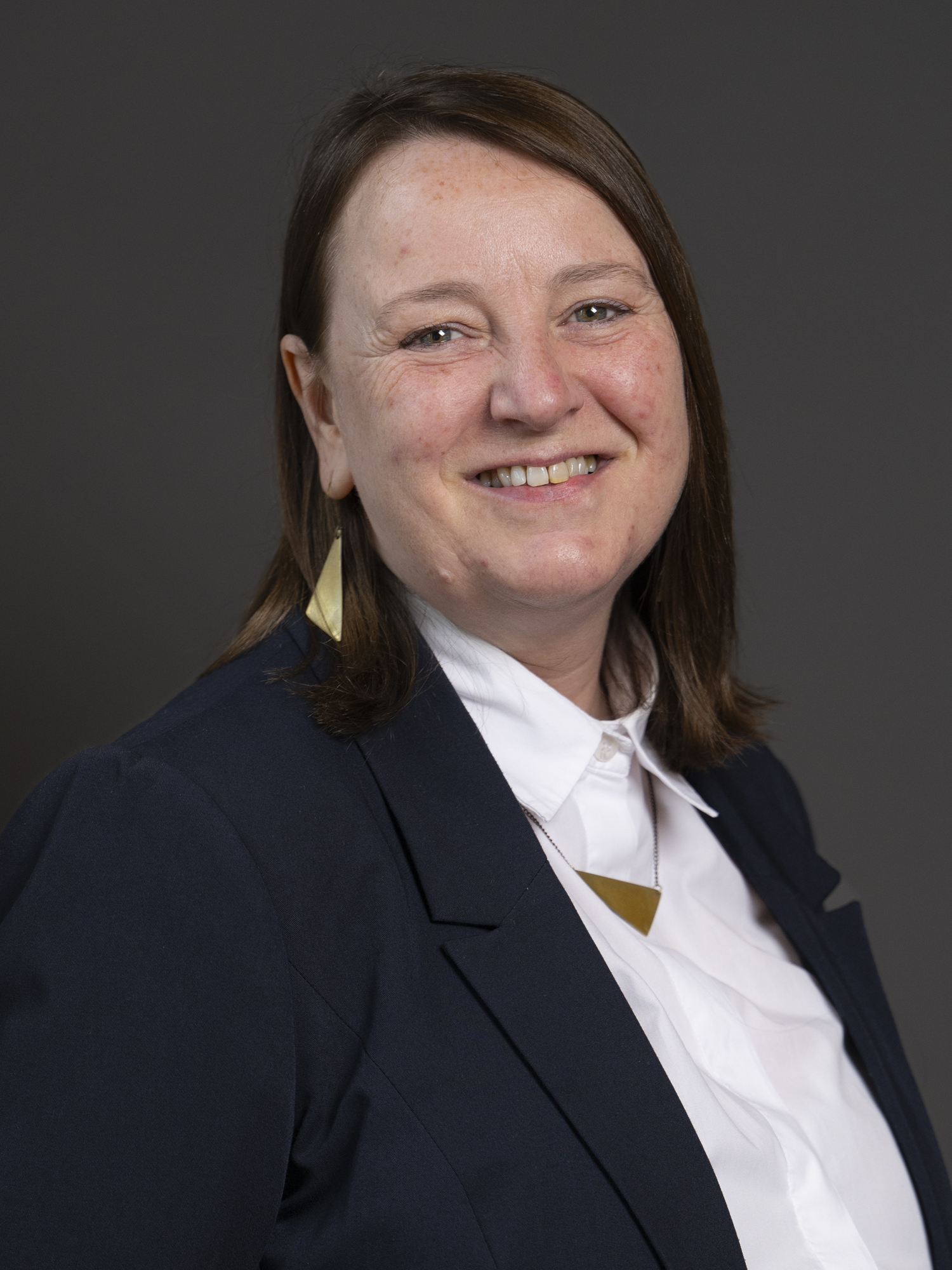
- Official portrait, 2024

Member of Parliament for Edinburgh North and Leith
- Incumbent
- Assumed office 4 July 2024
- Preceded by: Deidre Brock
- Majority: 7,268 (14.7%)

Personal details
- Citizenship: British
- Party: Labour

Tracy Gilbert is a Scottish Labour Party politician who has been Member of Parliament for Edinburgh North and Leith since 2024.

== Early life and career ==
Gilbert grew up in a mining town in Midlothian during the 1980s, and has spoken about how this has shaped her politics.

Before entering Parliament, Gilbert was a Housing Officer and the Scottish Regional Secretary of the USDAW trade union.

== Parliamentary career ==
At the 2024 general election, Gilbert was elected for the Edinburgh North and Leith constituency, becoming the first Labour MP to win the seat since 2010. Her result was part of a 'red wave' in Scotland, as the Scottish Labour Party won 37 seats, up from one seat in 2019.

Following a ballot on 5 September 2024, the MP for Edinburgh North and Leith, Tracy Gilbert (Labour) introduced the Private Members’ Bill titled Absent Voting (Elections in Scotland and Wales) Bill in the 2024–25 Parliament. The Bill proposed that voters in Scotland and Wales — for devolved elections (local government, the Scottish Parliament and the Senedd) — should be able to apply online for their postal (and proxy) votes, aligning the process with that available for reserved UK elections. It completed passage through both the House of Commons and the House of Lords, and received Royal Assent on 27 October 2025, thereby becoming the Absent Voting (Elections in Scotland and Wales) Act 2025.

Gilbert is actively involved in several APPGs, including:

Vice-Chair of the All-Party Parliamentary Group (APPG) on Commercial Sexual Exploitation (1) The cross-party group brings together Members of Parliament, peers, experts, and campaigners to address all forms of commercial sexual exploitation, including prostitution, sex trafficking, and the online facilitation of such activities.

As part of her role, Gilbert supports the group’s efforts to shape policy discussions, raise awareness, and promote legislative measures aimed at protecting victims and holding perpetrators to account.

Floating Offshore Wind APPG (2): As Chair and Registered Contact, Gilbert leads this group, which aims to raise awareness of the opportunities presented by floating offshore wind in the UK and to increase parliamentarians' knowledge of the sector.

Tracy Gilbert serves as a member of the International Development Committee, a select committee of the House of Commons responsible for scrutinising the expenditure, administration, and policy of the international aid functions of the Foreign, Commonwealth and Development Office, as well as public bodies working with the Office on international aid and official development assistance.

Gilbert has campaigned for the implementation of the Nordic model approach to prostitution of sex work. In a Westminster Hall debate on 10 June 2025 titled “Prostitution and Sex Trafficking: Demand,” she delivered a speech criticising sex trafficking.

At Labour's 2024 Autumn conference, Gilbert spoke at a fringe event organised by the gender critical Labour Women's Declaration group. She said her party's proposals for conversion therapy were flawed, that many parliamentarians would be unaware of the pitfalls of the proposals and they would need educated through persuasive conversations.

In 2024, Gilbert voted in favour of an assisted dying bill at second reading.

In 2025, she argued against gender self-identification for transgender people in a parliamentary debate about the topic.

In 2026, Gilbert was co-chair of Michael Marra's successful campaign in the 2026 Scottish Labour leadership election.

== Personal life ==
Gilbert is lesbian.

She currently resides in Leith.
