= Eric Milligan (politician) =

Scottish politician (b. 1951)

Eric Milligan (born 27 January 1951) was one of the Councillors for Sighthill/Gorgie ward, Edinburgh, Scotland. He was Convener of the Lothian and Borders Police Board from 2003 until 2007. He retired as a councillor in 2017. He is a member of the Labour Party.

Milligan was born on 27 January 1951. He was the last Convener of Lothian Regional Council (abolished at local government reorganisation in 1996 ). He subsequently became a member of the City of Edinburgh Council and Lord Provost of Edinburgh (1996–2003), one of the longest-serving holders of the office. He is a supporter of Heart of Midlothian FC.

Milligan received an Honorary Doctorate from Heriot-Watt University in 2004

== See also ==
- Lord Provost
- List of Lords Provost of Edinburgh

Preceded by Dr Norman Irons	Lord Provost of Edinburgh; 1996–2003	Succeeded by Lesley Hinds
