= 1974 City of Edinburgh District Council election =

City of Edinburgh District Council election

1974 City of Edinburgh Council election
← 1973	7 May 1974	1977 →

All 64 seats to Edinburgh City Council 33 seats needed for a majority
	First party	Second party	Third party
Party	Conservative	Labour	Liberal
Seats won	30	29	3
Popular vote	71,957	62,911	23,515
Percentage	41.4%	36.2%	13.5%
	Fourth party	Fifth party
Party	SNP	Independent
Seats won	1	1
Popular vote	11,677	2,944
Percentage	6.7%	1.7%
Council control before election
No overall control
Council control after election
No overall control

Elections to City of Edinburgh District Council were held on 7 May 1974, on the same day as the other Scottish local government elections. This was the first election to the district council following the implementation of the Local Government (Scotland) Act 1973.

The election used the 64 wards created by the Formation Electoral Arrangements in 1974. Each ward elected one councillor using first-past-the-post voting.

The council was left in no overall control following the election. The Conservatives were the largest party after they won 30 of the 64 seats. Labour were the second-largest party after taking 29 seats while the Liberals won three seats.

== Background ==
Following the local government reforms in 1890, Edinburgh became one of the four Counties of Cities and was administratively separate from Midlothian.

Following the recommendations in the Wheatly Report, the old system of counties and burghs – which had resulted in a mishmash of local government areas in which some small burghs had larger populations but far fewer responsibilities than some large burghs and even counties – was to be replaced by a new system of regional and district councils. The Local Government (Scotland) Act 1973 implemented most of the recommendations in the Wheatly Report. Edinburgh was combined with an area from Midlothian and an area from West Lothian which included the burgh of Queensferry and was placed into the City of Edinburgh district within the Lothian region.

== Results ==
1974 City of Edinburgh District Council election result
Party	Seats	Gains	Losses	Net gain/loss	Seats %	Votes %	Votes	+/−
Conservative	30			N/A	46.9	41.4	71,957	N/A
Labour	29			N/A	45.3	36.2	62,911	N/A
Liberal	3			N/A	4.7	13.5	23,515	N/A
SNP	1			N/A	1.6	6.7	11,677	N/A
Independent	1			N/A	1.6	1.7	2,944	N/A
Residents	0			N/A	0.0	0.2	422	N/A
Communist	0			N/A	0.0	0.2	358	N/A
All-in Democracy	0			N/A	0.0	0.1	116	N/A

== Ward results ==
Holyrood
Party	Candidate	Votes	%
Labour	B. Rutherford	1,382	61.4
Conservative	L. Taylor	616	27.4
Residents	H. Gray	252	11.2
Majority		766	34.0
Turnout		2,250	
Labour hold			

Meadows
Party	Candidate	Votes	%
Labour	R. Cairns	850	38.0
Conservative	T. MacLeod	693	31.0
Liberal	M. Falchikov	466	20.8
Independent	J. Forbes	227	10.2
Majority		157	7.0
Turnout		2,236	
Labour hold			

== Aftermath ==
The City of Edinburgh was the only district in the newly created Lothian region that was left in no overall control. The Conservatives were the largest party after winning 30 of the 64 seats. Labour were the second largest party after taking 29 seats. The Liberals won three seats, the Scottish National Party (SNP) took one and one independent candidate was elected. The regional council, which held its first election on the same day, was left in no overall control. Across Scotland, Labour won the most votes, the most seats and the most councils of any party.
