= Deidre Brock =

Australian-born Scottish National Party politician

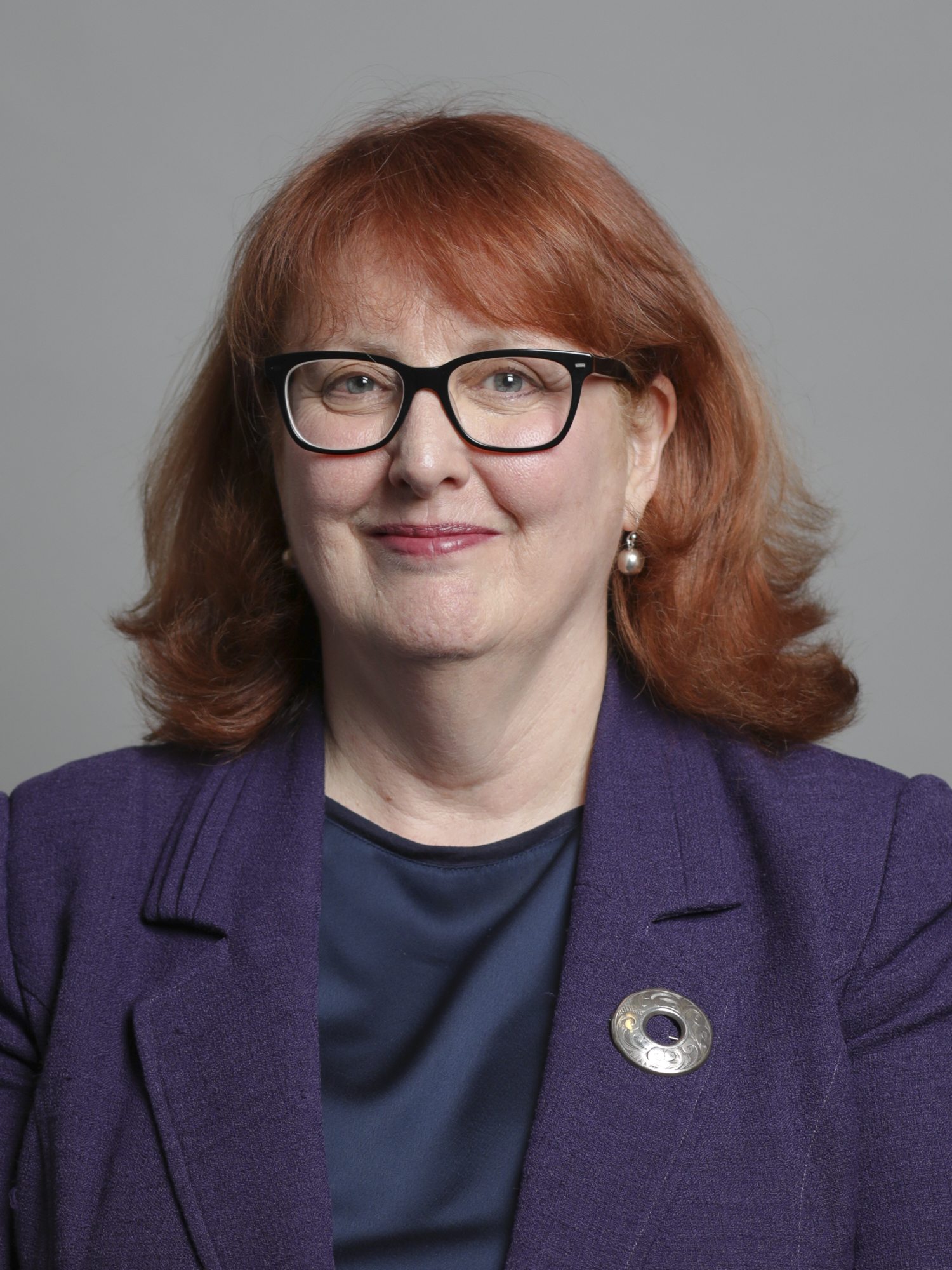
- Official portrait, 2020

SNP Spokesperson for House of Commons Business
- In office 10 December 2022 – 4 July 2024
- Leader: Stephen Flynn
- Preceded by: Pete Wishart
- Succeeded by: Position Abolished

SNP Spokesperson for Environment, Food and Rural Affairs
- In office 20 May 2015 – 10 December 2022
- Leader: Angus Robertson; Ian Blackford
- Preceded by: Office established
- Succeeded by: Patricia Gibson

Member of Parliament for Edinburgh North and Leith
- In office 7 May 2015 – 30 May 2024
- Preceded by: Mark Lazarowicz
- Succeeded by: Tracy Gilbert

Personal details
- Born: Deidre Leanne Brock; 8 December 1961 (age 64) Perth, Western Australia
- Citizenship: British; Australian
- Party: Scottish National Party
- Education: Curtin University; Western Australian Academy of Performing Arts
- Website: Official website

Deidre Leanne Brock (born 8 December 1961) is an Australian-born Scottish National Party (SNP) politician who was the Member of Parliament (MP) for Edinburgh North and Leith from 2015 to 2024. She is the first SNP representative to hold the seat at either a Westminster or Scottish Parliament level. Brock was the SNP House of Commons Business Spokesperson from December 2022 to July 2024.

== Early life and career ==
Deirdre Brock was born on 8 December 1961 in Perth, Western Australia. Her father had emigrated from England to Australia in his teens, making her a dual British and Australian national. She studied English at Curtin University and graduated with a BA, then studied acting at the Western Australian Academy of Performing Arts. In 1990, while working as an actress she appeared in an episode of the soap opera Home and Away. She moved to Scotland in 1996 to live with her partner, having met him when she visited the country on holiday a year earlier.

Brock worked for Rob Gibson before she was elected to the City of Edinburgh Council as an SNP councillor for the Leith Walk ward in 2007. She topped the poll with 2,550 first preferences. She was re-elected in the 2012 elections, again topping the poll with 1,735 first preferences, and became the Deputy Lord Provost of Edinburgh as the SNP and Scottish Labour formed an arrangement to run the council.

== Parliamentary career ==
At the 2015 general election, Brock was elected to Parliament as MP for Edinburgh North and Leith with 40.9% of the vote and a majority of 5,597. Brock was one of several SNP MPs who took their parliamentary oaths in both Gaelic and English.

Brock was re-elected as MP for Edinburgh North and Leith at the snap 2017 general election with a decreased vote share of 34% and a decreased majority of 1,625.

From July 2018 to May 2019, Brock was the Shadow SNP Spokesperson for the Environment, Food and Rural Affairs. She was previously the Spokesperson for Devolved Government Relations, Northern Ireland and Fair Work and Employment.

At the 2019 general election, Brock was again re-elected, with an increased vote share of 43.7% and an increased majority of 12,808.

In 2023, she was elected Policy Development Convener of the National Executive Committee of the Scottish National Party.

At the 2024 general election, Brock was defeated losing 16.4% of the vote from 2019 to Labour candidate Tracy Gilbert.

== Holyrood candidate ==
In 2026, Brock stood for the SNP as their candidate in the Edinburgh Southern seat for the Scottish Parliament election. Brock replaced the previous candidate, Sally Donald, who had withdrawn her candidacy in April. She was also ranked second on the SNP list for the Edinburgh and Lothians East region.

Parliament of the United Kingdom
Preceded by Mark Lazarowicz	Member of Parliament for Edinburgh North and Leith; 2015–2024	Succeeded by Tracy Gilbert
