= Lesley Hinds =

Scottish Labour Party politician

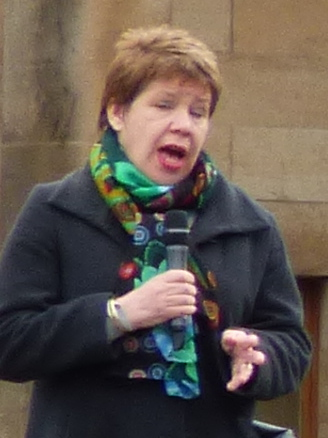
- Lesley Hinds speaking at the 2017 People's Climate March rally in Edinburgh

Leader of Edinburgh City Council
- In office 1993–1996

Councillor, Edinburgh City Council
- In office 1984–1996
- Preceded by: Mark Lazarowicz
- Succeeded by: Keith Geddes
- Constituency: Telford ward
- In office 1996–2007
- Constituency: Muirhouse and Drylaw ward

Lord Provost of Edinburgh
- In office 8 May 2003 – 3 May 2007
- Preceded by: Eric Milligan
- Succeeded by: George Grubb
- Constituency: Inverleith ward

Personal details
- Born: 3 August 1956 (age 69) Dundee, Scotland
- Party: Scottish Labour Party
- Spouse: Martin Hinds (m.1977)
- Children: one daughter, one son
- Education: Dundee College of Education
- Profession: teacher

Lesley Hinds is a Scottish Labour Party politician who served as Lord Provost of Edinburgh, Scotland from 2003 to 2007.

== Early life and education ==
Hinds was born on 3 August 1956 in Dundee, Scotland to Kenneth and Ena Nicol. She attended Kirkton High School in Dundee and studied at Dundee College of Education. She was a teacher at Deans Primary Schools in West Lothian from 1977 to 1980.

== Political career ==
She was first elected to Edinburgh District Council as a member of the Scottish Labour Party to represent the Telford ward in 1984, later becoming leader of the district council. In 1996 she was elected to represent the Muirhouse and Drylaw ward in the new City of Edinburgh unitary authority. Following the local elections in May 2007 she was one of four councillors representing the new Inverleith ward.

She was elected the Lord Provost of Edinburgh on 8 May 2003, succeeding Eric Milligan, however following elections on 3 May 2007, the Labour Party lost overall control of the City of Edinburgh and was succeeded in the office of Lord Provost by Liberal Democrat George Grubb.

Hinds fought the Edinburgh West seat at the 1997 general election, placing third. At the 2011 Scottish Parliament elections she stood as Labour's candidate in the Edinburgh Western constituency. The seat was won by Colin Keir of the SNP. Hinds came third behind Keir and the Liberal Democrats' Margaret Smith, who had held the seat since 1999.

Hinds was the convener of Edinburgh Council's Transport and Environment Committee from 2012 to 2017.

In 2016 Councillor Hinds announced that she was stepping down from politics and did not contest the Labour Seat of Edinburgh North and Leith, or stand in the 2017 local elections.

== Personal life ==
In 1977 she married Martin Hinds. Together they have a daughter and a son.

== See also ==
- List of Lord Provosts of Edinburgh.

Civic offices
| Preceded by Mark Lazarowicz | Leader of Edinburgh City Council; 1993 – 1996 | Succeeded by Keith Geddes |
| Preceded by Eric Milligan | Lord Provost of Edinburgh; 2003–2007 | Succeeded by George Grubb |
