= Edinburgh City Chambers =

Municipal building in Edinburgh, Scotland

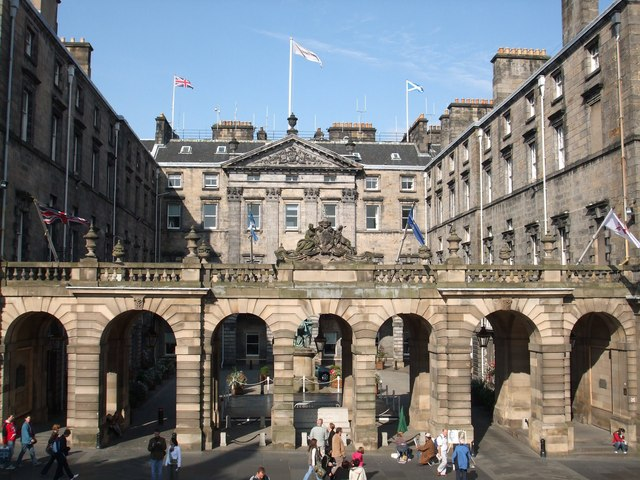
- Edinburgh City Chambers viewed across the Royal Mile from the Mercat Cross in Parliament Square

- Shown in Edinburgh
- 55.9503°N 3.1904°W
- Location: Edinburgh

History
- Built: 1760

Site notes
- Architect: John Adam

Listed Building – Category A
- Designated: 14 December 1970
- Reference no.: LB17597

Edinburgh City Chambers in Edinburgh, Scotland, is the meeting place of the City of Edinburgh Council and its predecessors, Edinburgh Corporation and Edinburgh District Council. It is a Category A listed building.

== History ==
The current building was originally built as the Royal Exchange, a meeting place and marketplace for Edinburgh's merchants and traders. It was funded by subscription and commissioned in 1753. It was designed by John Adam with detail alterations by John Fergus. The building works absorbed many small streets, commonly known in Edinburgh as "closes", that ran north to south across the breadth of the site. The Royal Exchange building sat partially on top of the truncated buildings on the closes that were subsequently blocked-off. These now underground closes were still accessible but were closed for public access for many years until reopened as 'The Real Mary King's Close'. The Exchange was opened by Lord Provost George Drummond in 1760.

The exchange had a coffee shop and shops including a millinery operated by Sibilla Hutton. The exchange never proved popular with the merchants for whom it was built, who persisted in meeting at the Mercat Cross or, rather, where the cross stood before it was removed in 1756. The Town Council took over the north range in 1811 as the City Chambers and by 1893 had bought the whole building.

The City Chambers housed Edinburgh Town Council from 1893 to 1895, when that body was replaced by Edinburgh Corporation. It remained the Corporation's headquarters until it in turn was replaced by Edinburgh District Council under the wider Lothian Regional Council in May 1975. It remained the district council's headquarters until the abolition of the Lothian Region led to the formation of Edinburgh City Council in April 1996.

The City Chambers were used as a filming location for the film Braveheart in 1995 and for the TV series Belgravia in 2019.

== Architecture ==
The main building is set back from the High Street behind a quadrangle fronted by a groin-vaulted open arcade screen facing the street. There is a prominent bronze statue of Alexander Taming Bucephalus, by John Steell, in the quadrangle. This was modelled in 1832 but not cast in bronze until 1883. It stood in St Andrew Square until 1916.

The "Stone of Remembrance", within the arcade on the High Street, commemorates residents of the royal burgh who lost their lives in the First World War. The monument was unveiled by Prince Henry on Armistice Day in 1927.

The bronze statue in the north east corner of the quadrangle is of General Stanisław Maczek, a Polish Second World War tank commander who was instrumental in the Allied liberation of France, and who lived in Edinburgh for the last 46 years of his life. The statue, which was unveiled in 2018, is the work of the Polish sculptor, Bronislaw Krzysztof.

Most of the interior and all of the main Council Chambers date from 1875 to 1890 and are by the City Architect of the time, Robert Morham. He also built the north-west wing in 1898 and the arched arcade fronting the courtyard in 1901. The east and west wings on the Royal Mile are by the later City Architect Ebenezer James MacRae in the 1930s. The west wing replaced the printworks of William Chambers where Chambers Dictionary was first published.

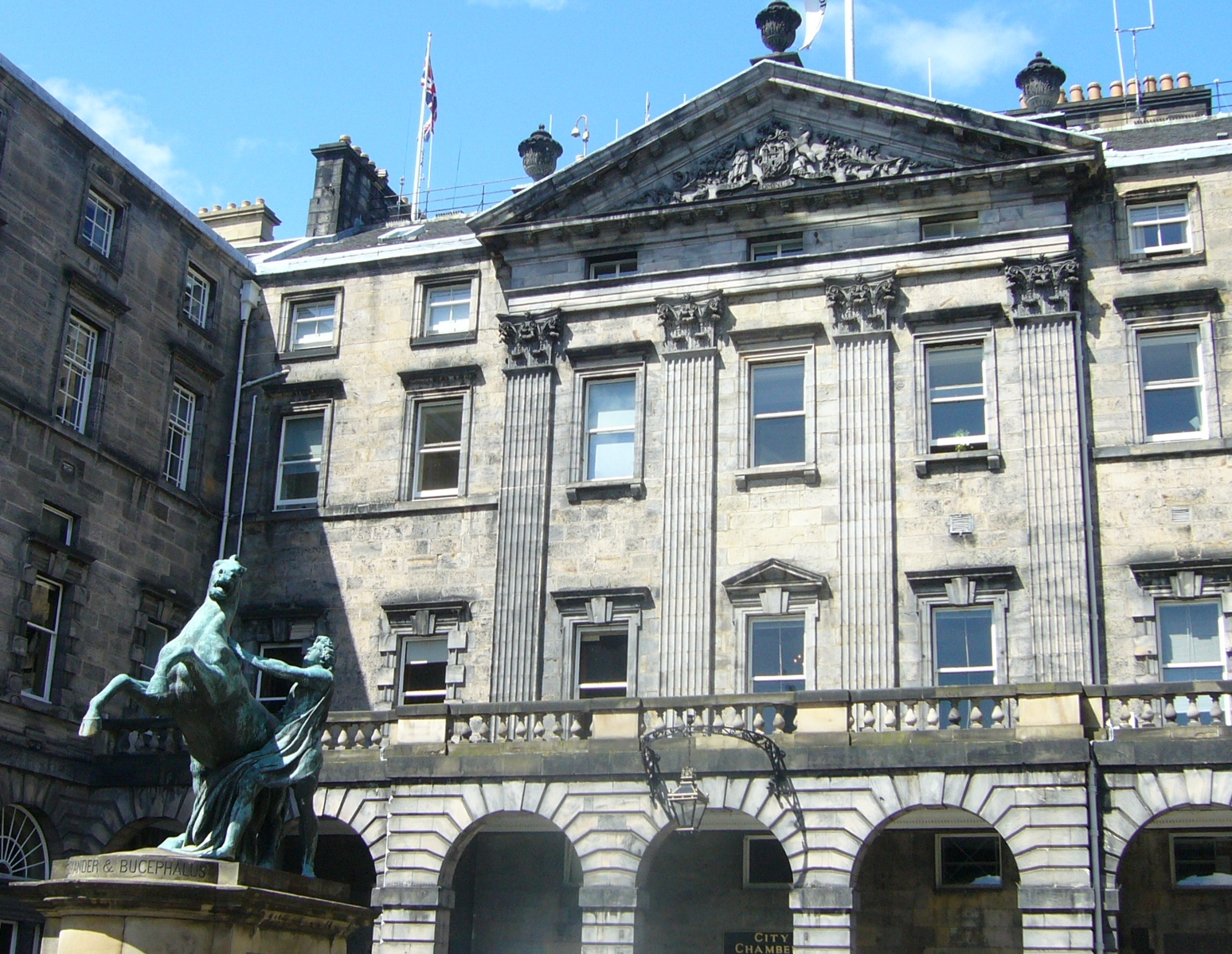
The former Royal Exchange, Edinburgh

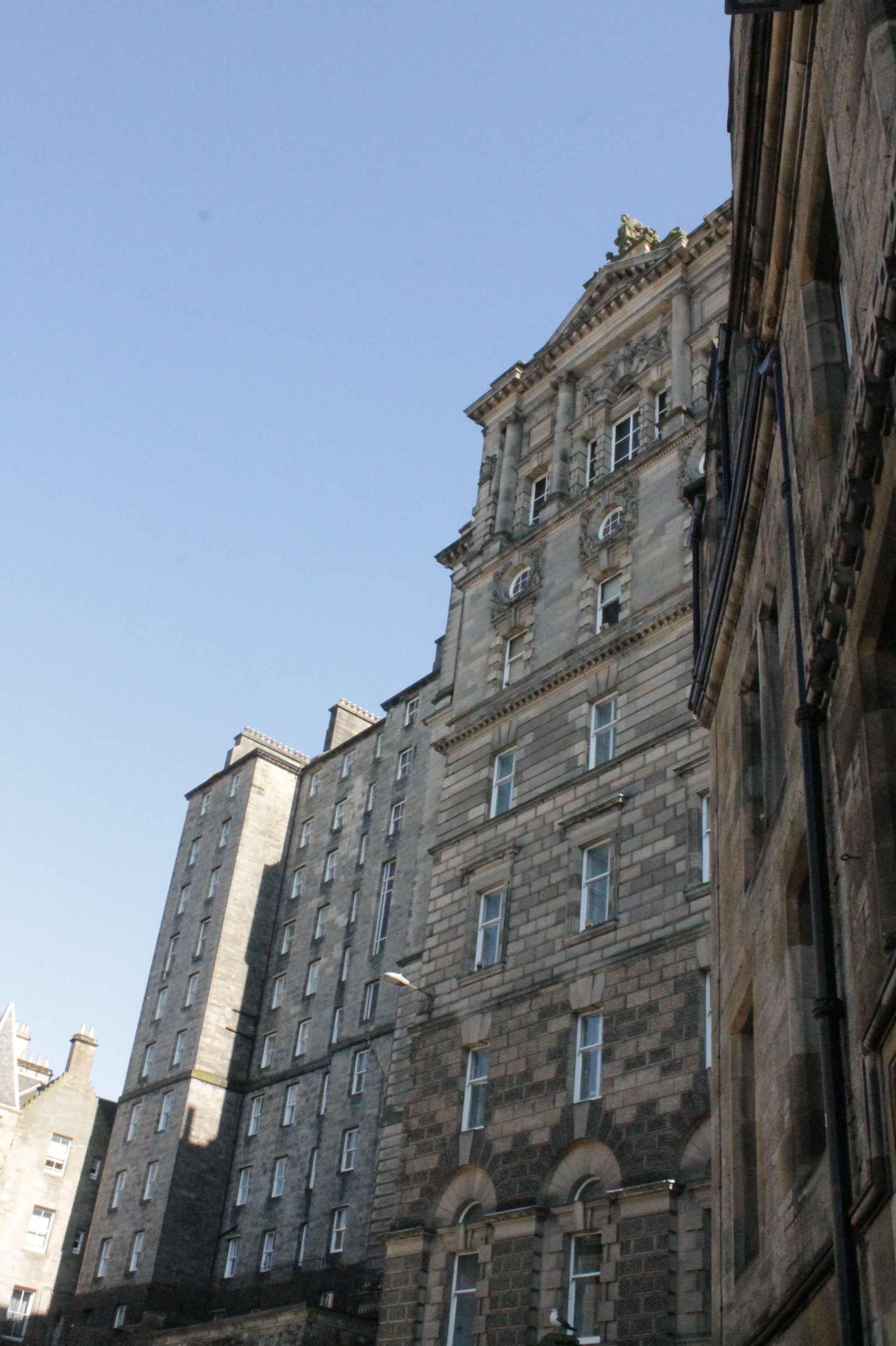
Edinburgh City Chambers from Cockburn Street

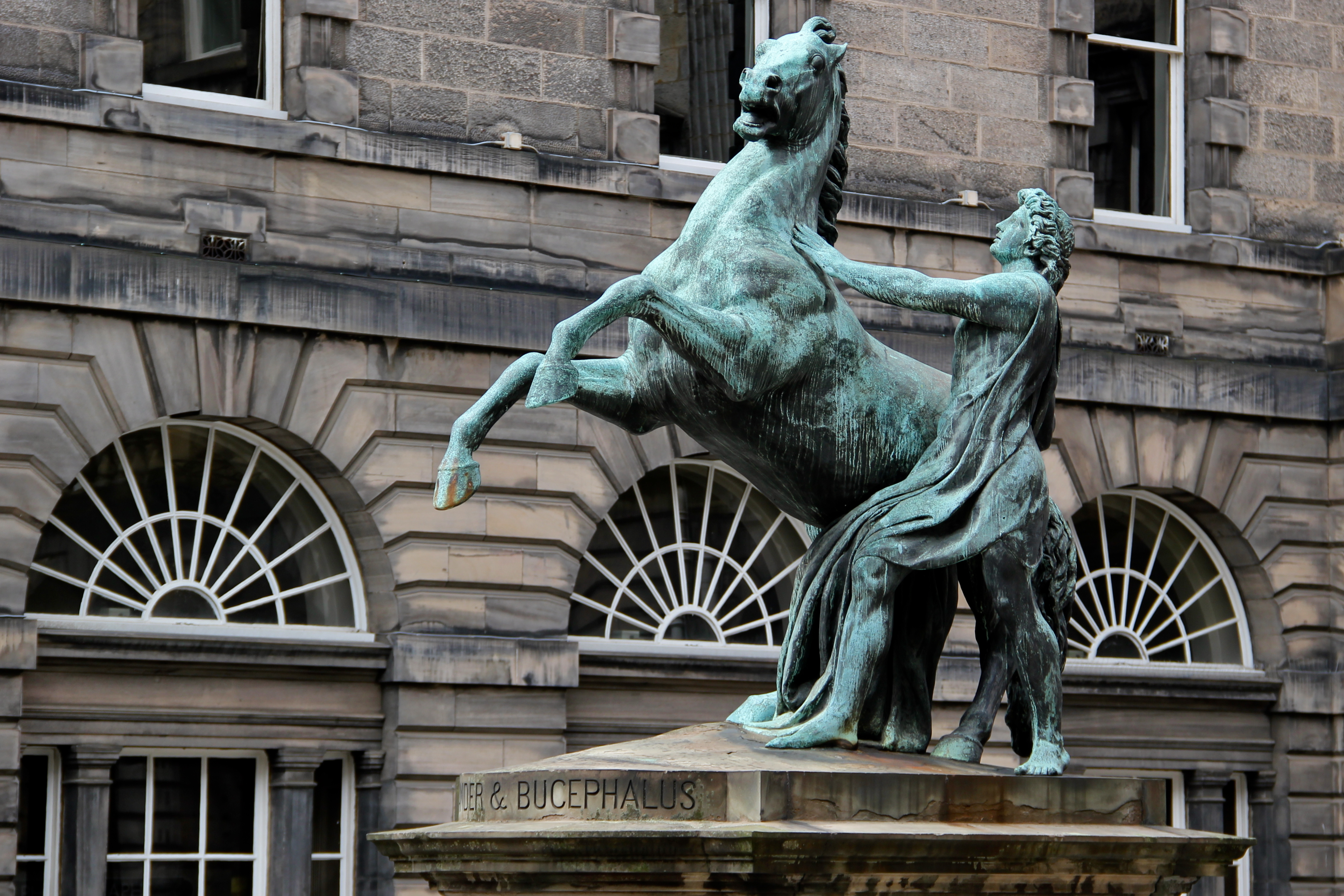
Alexander and Bucephalus by John Steell

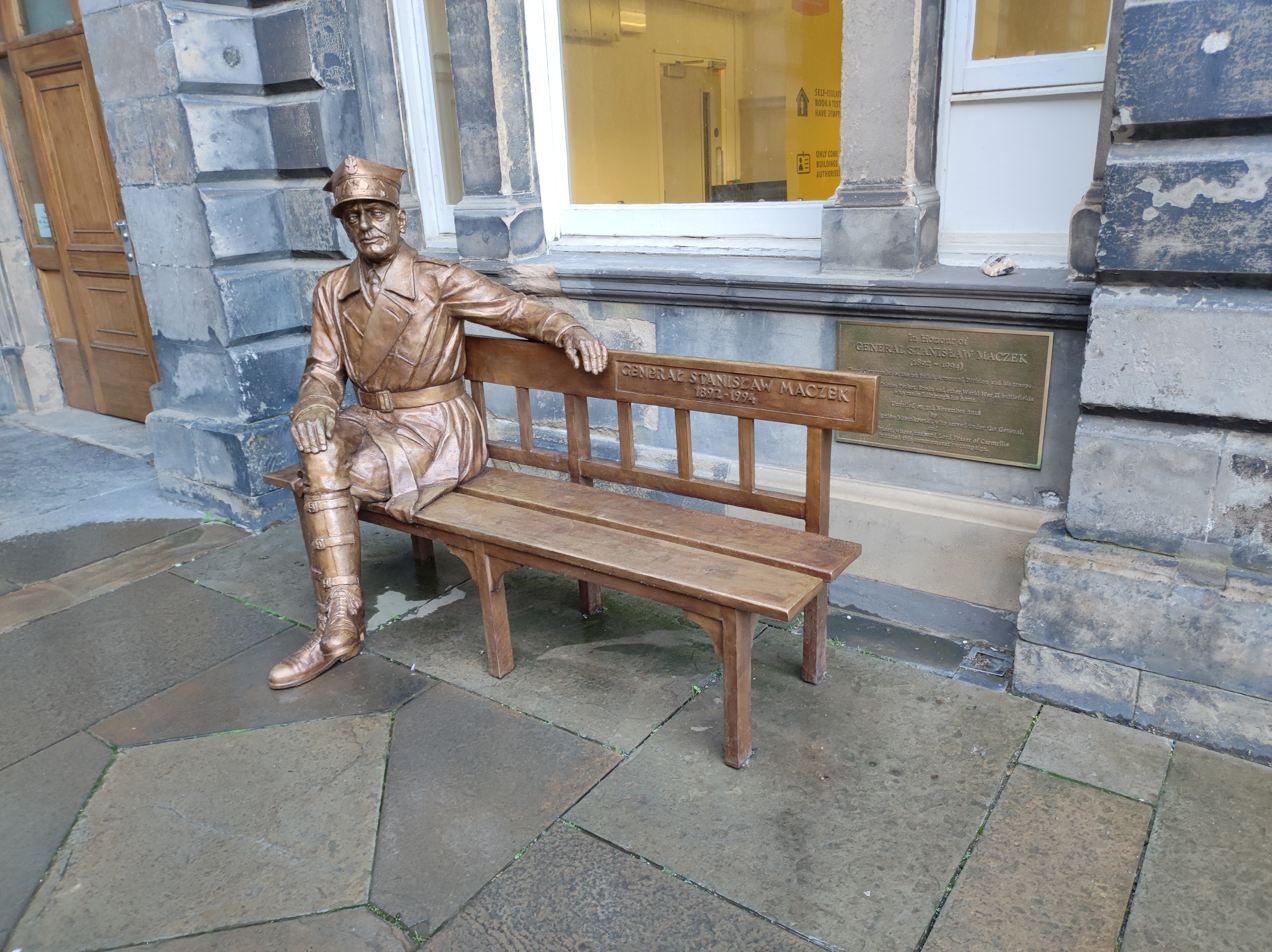
The bench and statue of General Stanisław Maczek

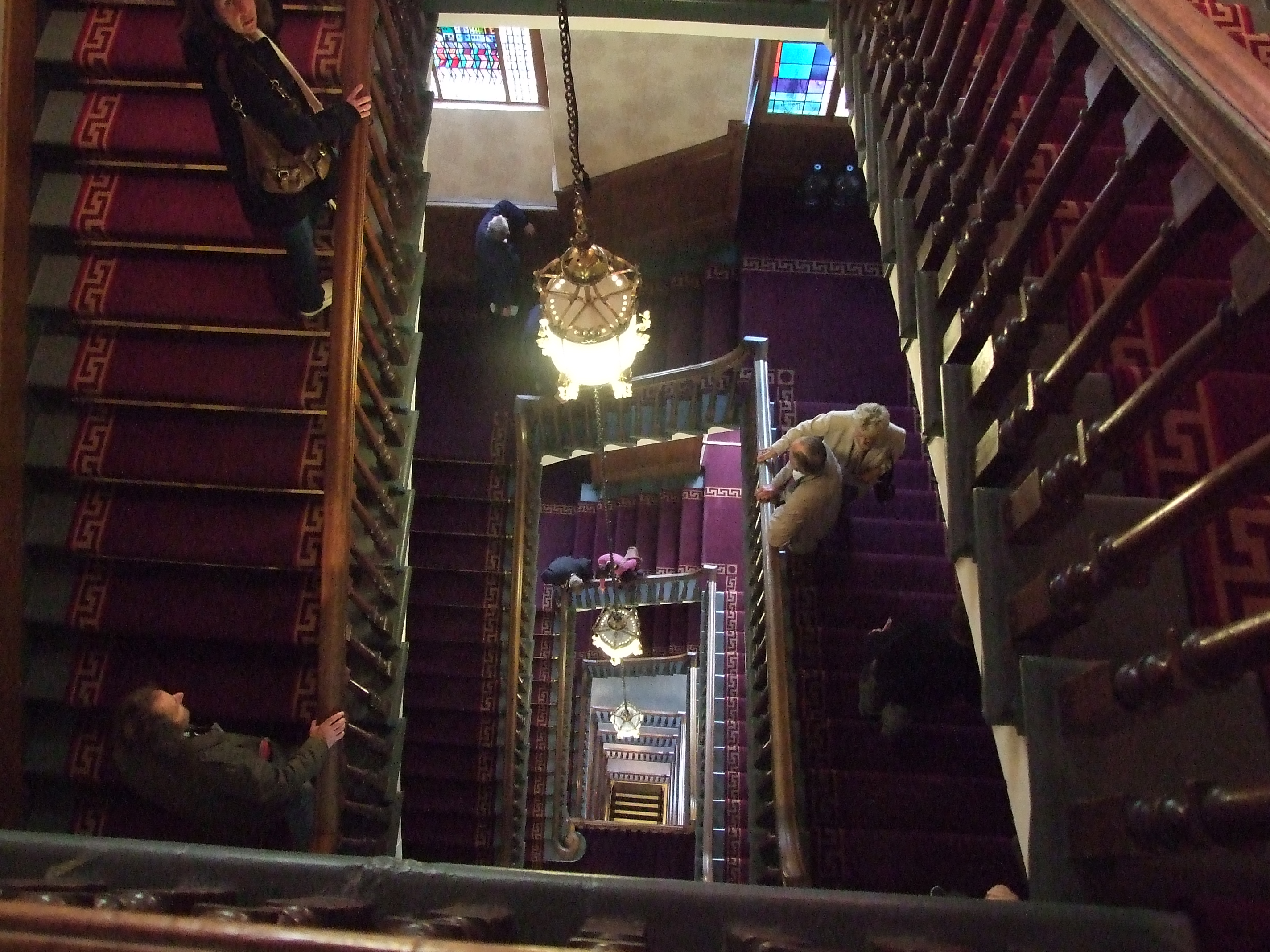
Main staircase

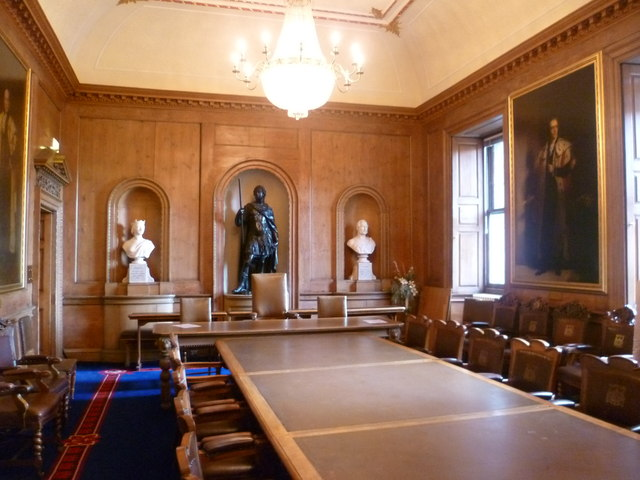
Council chamber

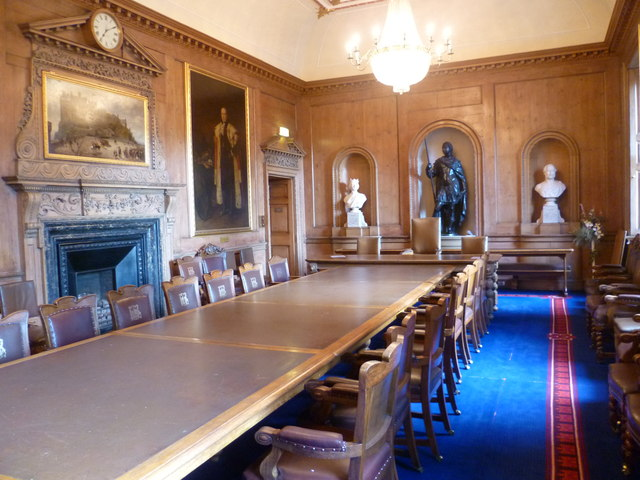
Council chamber

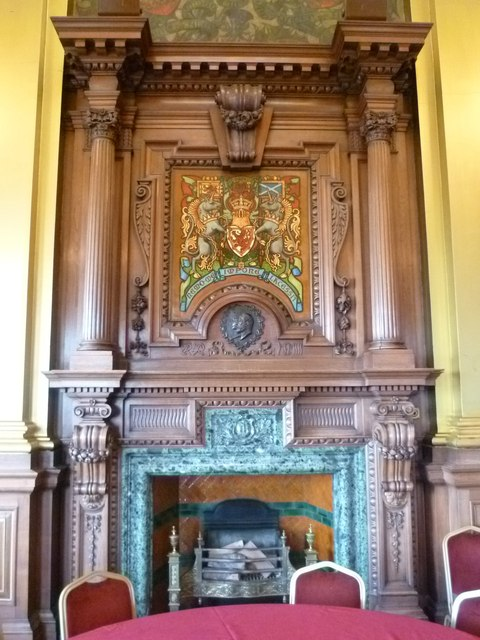
Fireplace in the Council Chamber, surmounted by a painting of the Royal coat of arms of Scotland

== See also ==
- List of listed buildings in Edinburgh/12
- Politics of Edinburgh
- Dunfermline City Chambers
- Glasgow City Chambers
- Scotland Malawi Partnership, based at the City Chambers
