= 1980 City of Edinburgh District Council election =

1980 Scottish local government election

1980 City of Edinburgh Council election
← 1977	1 May 1980	1984 →

All 62 seats to Edinburgh City Council 32 seats needed for a majority
	First party	Second party	Third party
Party	Conservative	Labour	Liberal
Last election	34	23	1
Seats won	31	25	2
Seat change	▼3	▲2	▲1
Popular vote	64,152	58,411	18,230
Percentage	40.2%	36.6%	11.4%
Swing	▼4.6%	▲10.0%	▲3.5%
	Fourth party	Fifth party	Sixth party
Party	SNP	Independent	Independent Labour
Last election	5	1	0
Seats won	2	1	1
Seat change	▼3	0	▲1
Popular vote	14,960	2,157	1,118
Percentage	9.4%	1.4%	0.7%
Swing	▼9.9%	▲0.4%	▲0.6%
- Map of council wards
Council control before election
Conservative
Council control after election
No overall control

Elections for the City of Edinburgh District Council took place on 1 May 1980, alongside elections to the councils of Scotland's various other districts. The Conservatives, who had previously controlled a majority on the council, were reduced to being just shy of a majority. The Conservatives continued to rule the council however, with Liberal support.

The election saw 4 new wards being added to Edinburgh; Fort, Shandon, Haymarket, and Tollcross. All, minus Tollcross, (which was won by the Conservatives) were won by Labour.

Turnout was 160,330.

== Aggregate results ==
City of Edinburgh District Council election, 1980
Party	Seats	Gains	Losses	Net gain/loss	Seats %	Votes %	Votes	+/−
Conservative	31	2	2	0	50.0	40.2	64,152	▼4.6
Labour	25	7	3	▲4	40.3	36.6	58,411	▲10.0
Liberal	2	2	0	▲2	3.2	11.4	18,230	▲3.5
SNP	2	0	3	▼3	3.2	9.4	14,960	▼9.9
Independent	1	0	0	0	1.6	1.4	2,157	▲0.4
Independent Labour	1	1	0	▲1	1.6	0.7	1,118	▲0.6
Scottish Ecology	0	0	0	0	0.0	0.4	576	New
Communist	0	0	0	0	0.0	0.04	65	▼0.1

== Ward results ==
1st, Queensferry
Party	Candidate	Votes	%
Independent	J. Milne	1,431	65.8
Labour	W. Nelson	745	34.2
Majority		686	31.6
Turnout		2,176	
Independent hold			

2nd, Kirkliston
Party	Candidate	Votes	%
SNP	D. Williams	1,088	45.1
Conservative	G. Brown	668	27.7
Labour	G. Grieve	657	27.2
Majority		420	17.4
Turnout		2,413	
SNP hold			

3rd, Balerno
Party	Candidate	Votes	%
Conservative	R. Powell	1,513	51.8
SNP	Mary Stein	723	24.7
Labour	D. Lindsay	687	23.5
Majority		723	27.1
Turnout		2,923	
Conservative hold			

4th, Baberton
Party	Candidate	Votes	%
Conservative	Elizabeth Roberson	1,573	47.0
Liberal	J. McCreesh	716	21.4
SNP	Shona Cole	582	17.4
Labour	D. Anderson	473	14.1
Majority		857	25.6
Turnout		3,344	
Conservative hold			

40th, Tollcross (New Seat)
Party	Candidate	Votes	%
Conservative	K. Alexander	887	
Labour	S. Gilmore	727	
Liberal	A. Hajducki	290	
SNP	J. Mitchell	188	
Scottish Ecology	S. Whitaker	127	
Majority		160	
Turnout			
Conservative win (new seat)			

42nd, Holyrood
Party	Candidate	Votes	%
Labour	R. Kerle	1,105	
Independent	G. Forbes	613	
Conservative	B. Monteith	300	
SNP	C. Cunningham	207	
Communist	Carol Downes	19	
Majority		492	
Turnout			
Labour hold			

53rd, Colinton
Party	Candidate	Votes	%
Conservative	J. D. Maclennan	2,693	88.5
Labour	E. Fallon	350	11.5
Majority		2,343	77.0
Turnout		3,043	
Conservative hold			

56th, Fairmilehead
Party	Candidate	Votes	%
Conservative	B. Meek	2,343	69.5
Liberal	M. Dougall	776	23.0
Labour	I. Christie	252	7.5
Majority		1,567	46.5
Turnout		3,371	
Conservative hold			
