= Mark Lazarowicz =

British Labour Co-op politician (born 1953)

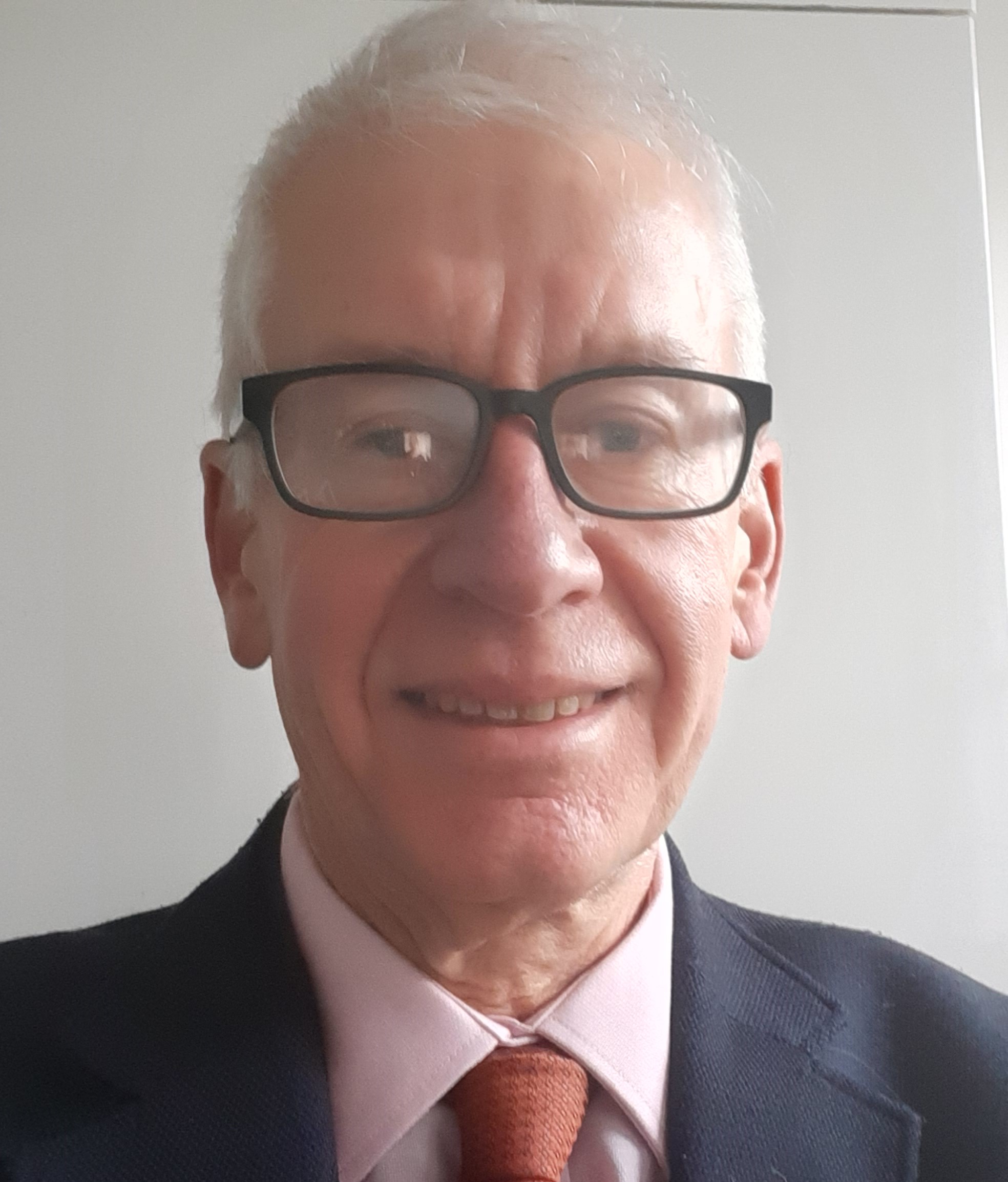

Member of Parliament for Edinburgh North and Leith
- In office 7 June 2001 – 30 March 2015
- Preceded by: Malcolm Chisholm
- Succeeded by: Deidre Brock

Personal details
- Born: Marek Jerzy Lazarowicz; 8 August 1953 (age 72) Romford, Essex, England, UK
- Party: Labour
- Children: 4
- Education: University of St Andrews; University of Edinburgh
- Website: Official website

Mark Lazarowicz (/ləˈzʊrəvɪtʃ/ lə-ZUURR-ə-vitch; born Marek Lazarowicz; 8 August 1953) is a British Labour Co-operative politician and lawyer who was the Member of Parliament (MP) for Edinburgh North and Leith from 2001 to 2015.

== Early life ==
Lazarowicz was born in Romford. He graduated from the University of St Andrews, where he had been Chairman of the St Andrews University Labour Club with an MA in Medieval History and Moral Philosophy in 1976, and the University of Edinburgh with an LLB in Law in 1992. He served as a Labour councillor on the City of Edinburgh District Council from 1980 to 1996, and was Leader of the Council from 1986 to 1993. He began practising law as an advocate at the Scottish bar in 1996. From 1999 to 2001, he was a member of the unitary City of Edinburgh Council, serving as Executive Member for Transport.

== Parliamentary career ==
Lazarowicz stood for the House of Commons, unsuccessfully, for Edinburgh Pentlands at the 1987 general election and again in 1992, but was defeated by Malcolm Rifkind on both occasions. He was elected as Member of Parliament for Edinburgh North and Leith in June 2001 and was re-elected in May 2005 and May 2010, for the now expanded Edinburgh North and Leith constituency.

Lazarowicz was a member of the House of Commons Environmental Audit Committee. He previously served on the Environmental, Food and Rural Affairs Select Committee, the Scottish Affairs Committee and the Modernisation Committee. Between October 2010 and 2011 he was Labour's shadow Minister for International Development. Lazarowicz succeeded in having two Private Member's Bills passed. In 2002 he piloted the Employee Share Schemes Bill through Parliament, and in 2006 the Climate Change and Sustainable Energy Bill. He won the PRASEG Parliamentarian of the Year Award in 2006 for his work in promoting renewable energy.

In 2008, Lazarowicz lodged a further Private Member's Bill to restrict ship-to-ship oil transfers, with the aim of preventing spillages in the Firth of Forth. In response, the government introduced regulations to restrict such transfers in April 2010 which were then delayed, but were brought into force in December 2010.

In October 2008, Lazarowicz was made the Prime Minister's Special Representative on Global Carbon Markets and his report on the issue, Global Carbon Trading: a framework for reducing emissions was published in July 2009.

He rebelled against the Labour government on the Iraq war vote in 2003. He also opposed the Conservative government's Immigration Bill and retrospective legislation on workfare.

Lazarowicz was defeated at the 2015 general election by the Scottish National Party's Deidre Brock.

== Later career ==
Following his defeat in 2015, Lazarowicz returned to legal practice. His legal specialisms include public law, judicial review and human rights, immigration and asylum, personal injury, and planning and environmental law. He is the joint author of The Scottish Parliament: An Introduction, published in 1999 with new editions in 2000, 2003 and 2010. This was published as a revised work in a new edition in 2018, with the title "The Scottish Parliament: Law and Practice."

== Personal life ==
Lazarowicz is married with four children. He has been a supporter of many environmental causes, and in 2015 he was elected as an Honorary Fellow of Scottish Environment Link.

Civic offices
Preceded by Alex Wood	Leader of Edinburgh City Council; 1986 – 1993	Succeeded by Lesley Hinds
Parliament of the United Kingdom
Preceded by Malcolm Chisholm	Member of Parliament for Edinburgh North and Leith; 2001–2015	Succeeded by Deidre Brock
