= Wester Hailes Education Centre =

Location
- 5 Murrayburn Drive; Edinburgh, EH14 2SU; 55°55′3.73″N 3°17′22.1″W

Information
- Local authority: Edinburgh City
- Head teacher: David Young
- Website: www.westerhaileshighschool.co.uk

Wester Hailes High School is a mixed non-denominational high school in Wester Hailes, in the South-West suburb of Edinburgh. The current principal is David Young and the roll is about 303. In addition to the school on the site, there is a swimming pool and fitness centre which are open to the public, and a youth work programme.

== HMI(E) ==
The school was last inspected by Her Majesty's Inspectorate of Education in 2010. The report, issued in April 2010, highlights areas of strength as being school spirit, good student behaviour and teamwork. Areas for improvement were attendance, achievement, the overall quality of students' learning experiences, and identifying areas for improvement in a structured way. A follow-up report published in May 2011 found that significant progress had been made in these areas.

The school was ranked equal last in Scotland with 0% of students leaving with 2 or more higher grade certificates.
