= Radio Lollipop =

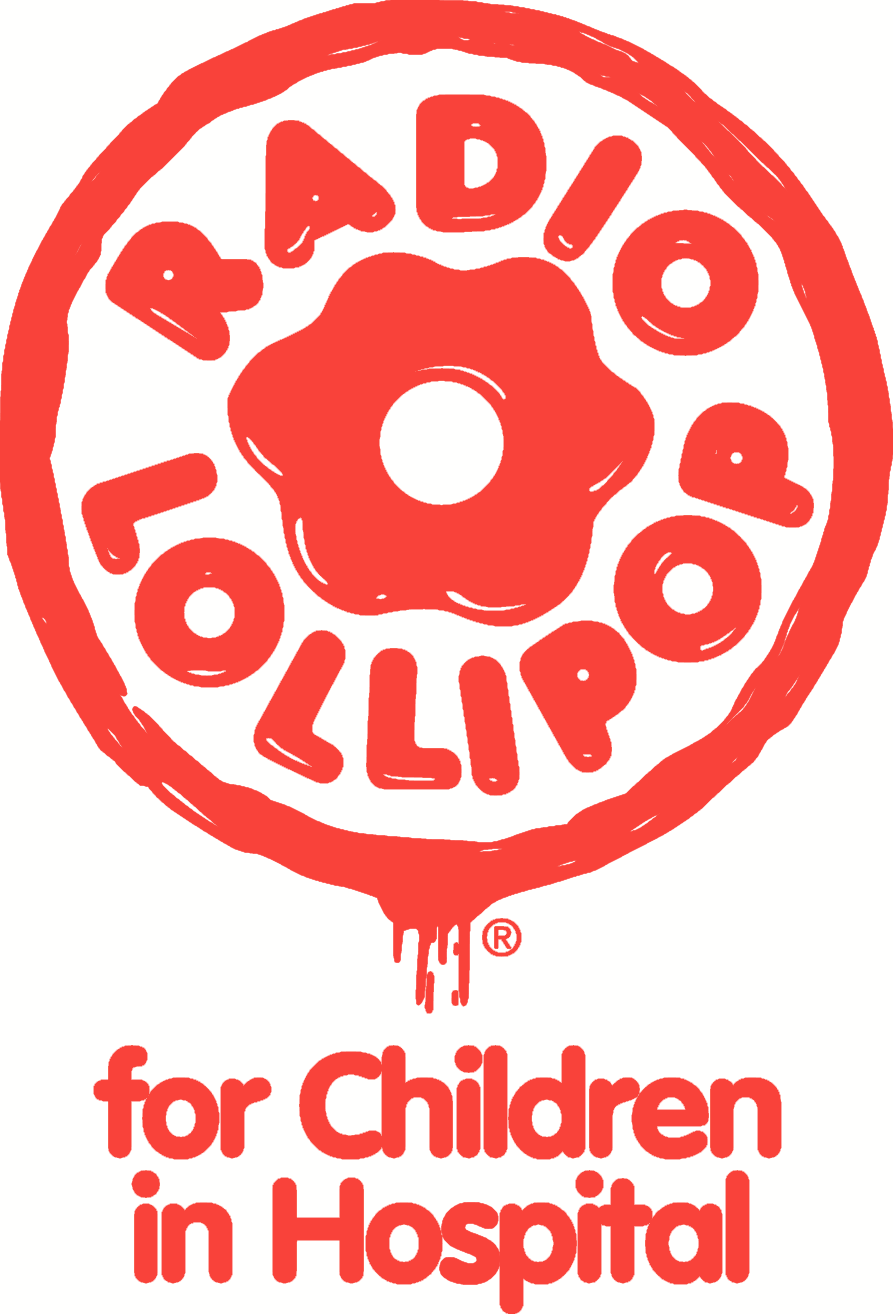
- Formation: 5 May 1979; 47 years ago
- Founded: 1978
- Type: Nonprofit
- Registration no.: England and Wales: 280817; Scotland: SC039505
- Location: Charlotte Building, 17 Gresse Street, London, W1T 1QL
- Region served: Australia; New Zealand; United Kingdom; United States; South Africa
- Method: Radio programming and play interaction at the bedside and in the playrooms
- Website: https://radiolollipop.org

Radio Lollipop is a charitable organisation providing a care, comfort, play and entertainment service for children in hospital. It organises Volunteer Playmakers to spend time with children in wards or in special play areas, taking its name from the radio stations it runs in hospitals playing children's programming - part-presented by children themselves.

== History ==
Radio Lollipop was founded in 1978 at Queen Mary's Hospital for Children in Surrey, England, at first primarily as a cable-wired station for the 460 children in the hospital. The station made its first broadcast on 5 May 1979, when the first Radio Lollipop went on-air.

Following the success of the first station, the International Year of the Child Committee provided funding in 1980 to develop Radio Lollipops in other British hospitals.

Over time, emphasis shifted from the radio station to volunteers spending time on wards entertaining children in person, by playing games, doing arts and crafts, and reading stories. However, the "radio", with children's programming and often presenting on-air, remains a central part of the charity. Programming consists of on-air presenter-banter with children, interspersed with request songs, comedy and competitions. In most hospitals, the programme is wired to speakers in wards, rather than actually broadcast, but a central studio, with on-air presenters, provides a focal point and base, and is open to children. There is a project under-way to carry feed from other hospitals in different time zones throughout the day, via the internet. Radio Lollipop is run entirely by unpaid volunteers, usually a mix of city business people, retirees and medical students, and usually operates in the evenings.

In 1985, the first Radio Lollipop outside the UK was started at the Princess Margaret Hospital for Children in Perth, Western Australia. From that beginning, the organisation has expanded to hospitals in the east coast of Australia, New Zealand, America and South Africa

Radio Lollipop is in one of the largest specialist children referral hospitals in the world, Great Ormond Street Hospital for Children, where it provides play services to children in 390 beds on 21 wards. It originally broadcast radio from, and held play sessions in, a former Jubilee line tube train that was craned into the hospital and converted to house the Radio Lollipop studio.

== Locations ==
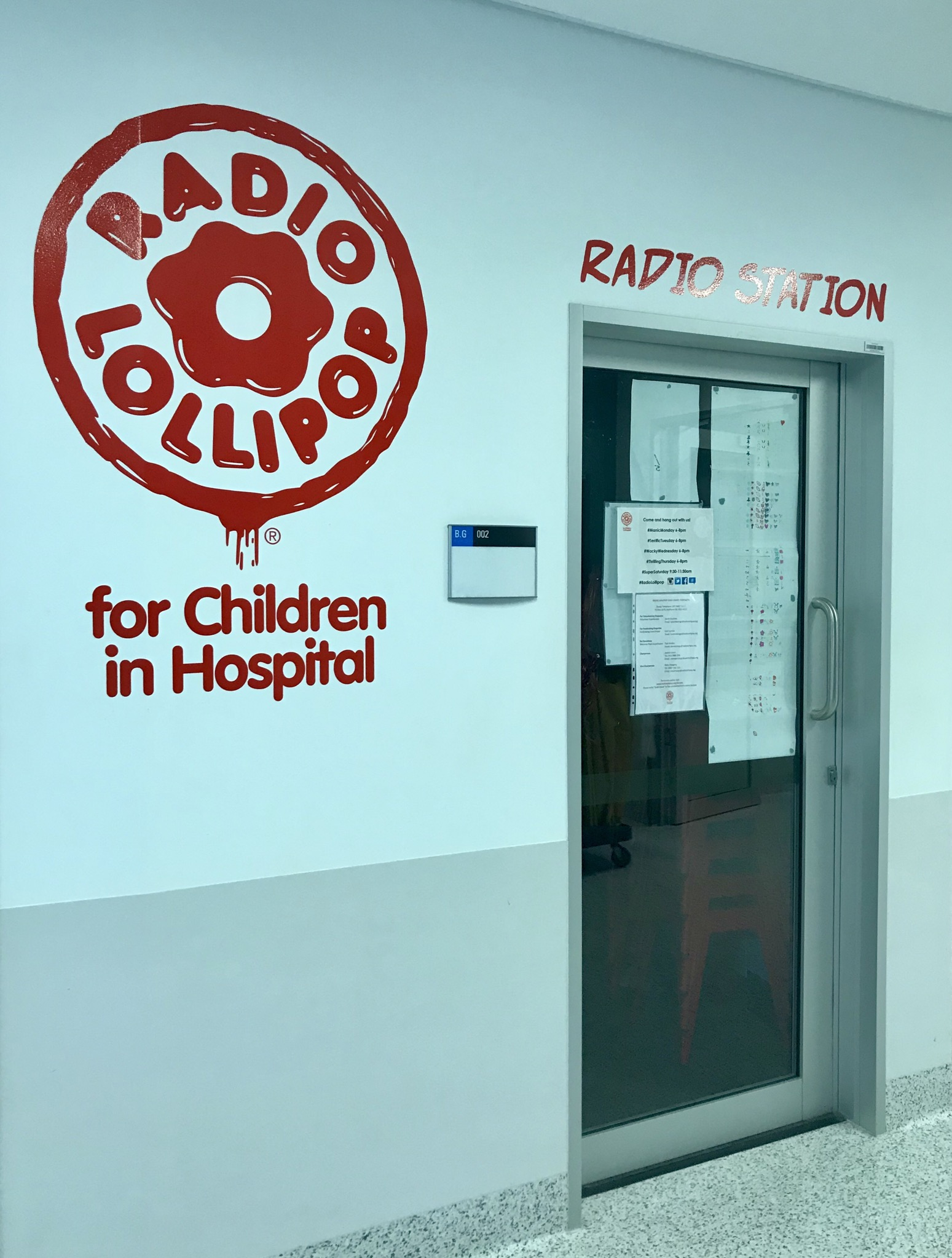
Radio Lollipop, Pediatrics Ward Block B at Gold Coast University Hospital

=== Australia ===
- Perth Children's Hospital, Perth, Western Australia
- St John of God Murdoch Hospital, Murdoch, Western Australia
- Fiona Stanley Hospital, Murdoch, Western Australia
- St John of God Midland Hospital, Midland, Western Australia
- Joondalup Health Campus, Joondalup, Western Australia
- Armadale Kelmscott District Memorial Hospital, Armadale, Western Australia
- Rockingham, Western Australia
- Kalgoorlie Regional Hospital, Kalgoorlie, Western Australia
- Mater Children's Hospital, Brisbane, Queensland
- Queensland Children's Hospital, Brisbane, Queensland
- Logan Hospital, Meadowbrook, Queensland
- Gold Coast University Hospital, Southport, Queensland
- Monash Children's Hospital, Melbourne, Victoria

=== New Zealand ===
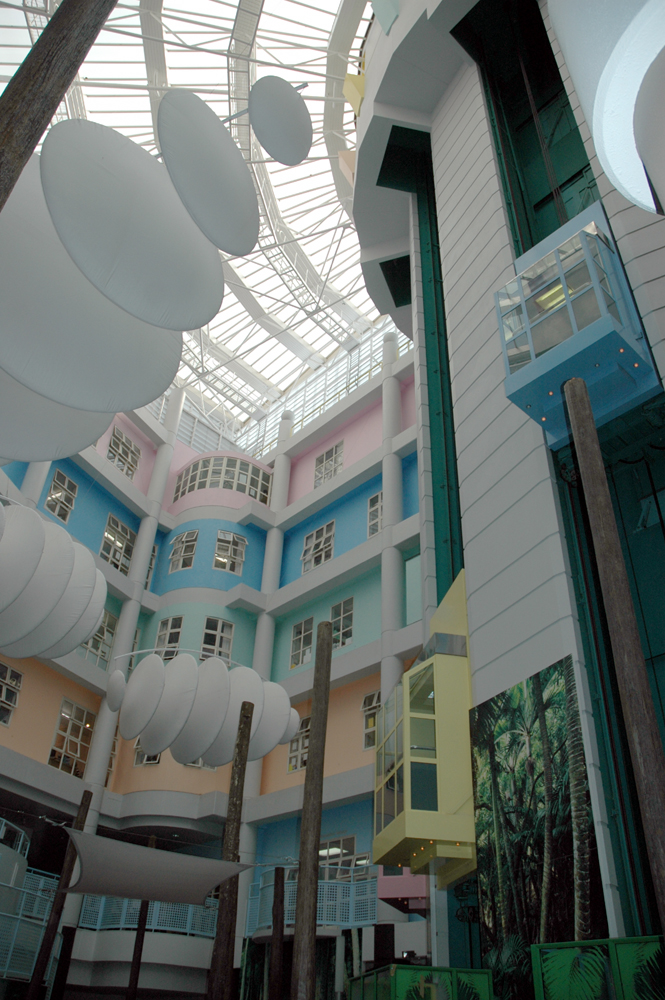
Starship hospital's atrium, location of its radio station

- Starship Children's Hospital, Auckland
- Kidz First, Middlemore Hospital, Auckland
- Waitakere Hospital, Auckland
- Manukau SuperClinic, Auckland
- Christchurch Hospital, Christchurch
- Whangarei Base Hospital, Whangārei

=== United Kingdom ===
- Royal Hospital for Sick Children, Edinburgh
- Royal Hospital for Children, Glasgow
- Birmingham Children's Hospital, Birmingham
- Royal Victoria Infirmary, Newcastle-upon-Tyne
- Bristol Royal Hospital for Children, Bristol
- University Hospital Southampton NHS Foundation Trust, Southampton
- Manchester Children's Hospital NHS Trust, Manchester
- Ninewells Hospital and Medical School, Dundee
- Great Ormond Street Hospital, London
- Evelina Children's Hospital, London

=== United States ===
- Morgan Stanley Children's Hospital, New York
- Children's Memorial Hermann Hospital | Memorial Hermann, Houston
- Holtz Children's Hospital, Florida

=== South Africa ===
- Nelson Mandela Children's Hospital, Johannesburg
