= Gold Coast Hospital =

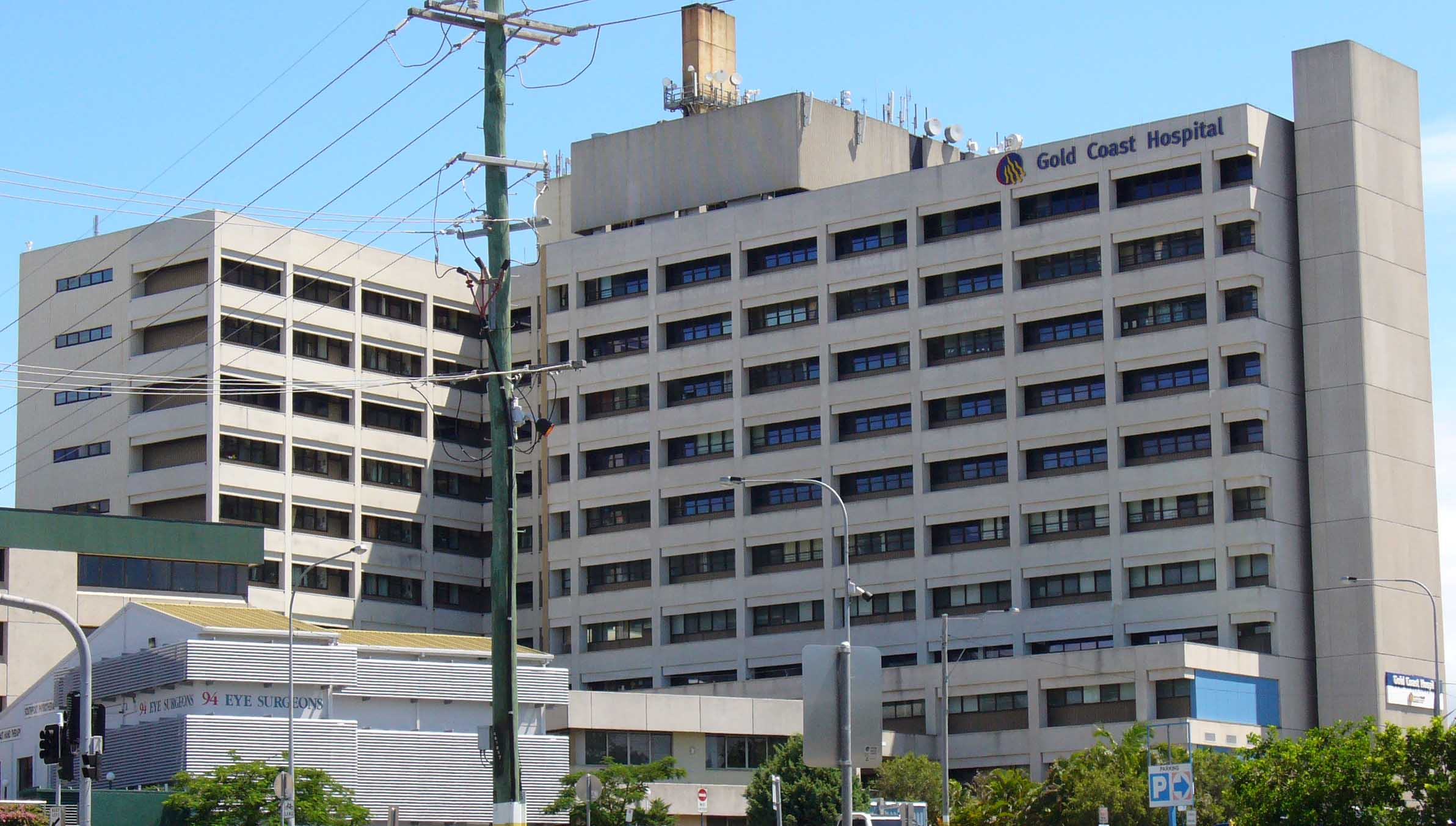

Geography
- Location: Gold Coast, Queensland, Queensland, Australia
- Coordinates: 27°58′20.64″S 153°24′36″E

Organisation
- Care system: Public Medicare (AU)
- Type: Teaching, District General
- Affiliated university: Griffith University, Bond University

Services
- Emergency department: Level I
- Beds: approximately 500

History
- Founded: 1922
- Closed: 28 September 2013

Links
- Website: goldcoast.health.qld.gov.au
- Lists: Hospitals in Australia

Gold Coast Hospital, located at 98–136 Nerang Street, Southport was, from 1960 to 2013 a major teaching and Tertiary referral hospital and the third largest in Queensland. The Gold Coast Hospital had one of the busiest emergency departments in the state. The Hospital admitted over 60,000 patients annually. It was replaced by the Gold Coast University Hospital.

== History ==
The site of the Gold Coast Hospital, also formerly known as the Southport Maternity Hospital, was first identified as being a suitable location for a hospital in 1921 after a number of other locations had been considered. An initial parcel of land fronting Nerang and Queens Streets was offered by the owner Mr. W. R. Black who had purchased the property specifically for use as a public hospital. Confirmation of the acceptance of Mr. Black's offer was noted at a meeting of the Women's Hospital Committee presided over by Mrs. Murray-Prior at the Southport School of the Arts in September 1921.

The site, also known as the 'old rectory' and approved by the Home Office as being suitable for a hospital, was retained by Mr. Black on the understanding that it would be sold at the purchase price to the Southport Memorial Hospital Committee, which had been established in 1918, when funds and plans had progressed further. A series of fund raising events took place in the following years and by 1926 it was reported that £2,000 had been raised and additional land surrounding Mr. Black's property had been secured.

The committee of the Southport and District Public Memorial Hospital applied to the Brisbane and South Coast Hospital Board requesting that an initial twelve bed facility be built on the site. At the time, the South Coast region was without public hospital facilities and patients were transferred to Brisbane. The committee undertook to calculate how many local residents had required transportation and treatment in Brisbane over the previous three years. In 1929, Mr. A. Pope, from the Brisbane and South Coast Hospital Board, addressed a meeting of the Southport Town Council and explained that a hospital in Southport would be held over.

Despite the efforts of the Southport Hospital Committee, which included members of the Southport Town Council on its board, and the local community, construction of the hospital had not commenced by the 1930s. In 1934, the site and £100 debt, was offered to the Brisbane and South Coast Hospitals Board on the condition the land was used for hospital purposes. The transfer of the five and a half acre parcel of land valued at £2,500 went ahead although the new owners stressed that the subsidiary hospital would not be built immediately.

The following year, other sites were under consideration and, by 1938, the Brisbane and South Coast Hospitals Board were recommending that the site be subdivided and sold with the proceeds being used to acquire a property known as Staghorn which was considered to have better drainage and a more favourable location.

In December 1950 construction of a maternity hospital was nearing completion on the site originally selected in 1921. Following a shark attack of a life saver, Leo Vincent Ryan, at Burleigh Heads, which highlighted the lack of emergency facilities in the region, the decision was made to build a general hospital adjoining the new maternity hospital. At the time, in addition to Brisbane, the nearest public hospital was at Murwillumbah, New South Wales.

The 18 bed maternity hospital opened on 14 January 1952 and, at its official opening in July 1952 it was reported that 156 babies had been born in the intervening seven months at the hospital.

By 1954, the region had 20,000 residents, plans for the general hospital had not progressed and the lack of public hospital facilities was being discussed in the newspapers. The matter was raised in the Queensland State Parliament and it was acknowledged that there were insufficient funds due to 'every penny' going to the South Brisbane Auxiliary Hospital.

Six years later, on 2 April 1960 and after four decades of lobbying, the Southport General Hospital was officially opened. It consisted of four buildings containing two wards, operating theatres, x-ray facilities and quarters for staff and amenities.

== Publicity ==
In February 2008, it was reported that Queensland's public hospitals were putting lives at risk by failing to deliver adequate care across a range of key areas. The report found nine instances where public hospitals failed one of the 13 surgical indicators, with the Gold Coast Hospital responsible for three of these.

== Closure ==
On 28 September 2013, the Gold Coast Hospital at Southport closed. All patients were transferred to the new Gold Coast University Hospital at 1 Hospital Boulevard, off Parklands Drive in Southport. The Robina Hospital is also available on the Gold Coast.

== Demolition and Re-development ==
In mid 2014, demolition of the 20 buildings on the 3.4-hectare (8.4-acre) site commenced to free up the area for new commercial development opportunities within the Southport Priority Development Area. Completion of the demolition works was expected by mid 2015. Developer Nerang St Pty Ltd filed a development application for residential and commercial towers in 2017, with approval granted in March 2018.

== See also ==
- Gold Coast University Hospital
- List of hospitals in Australia
