= Tudor Court, Melbourne =

General information
- Type: Residence, Reception Centre
- Architectural style: Queen Anne Revival
- Location: 141 Kooyong Rd, Caulfield North, Melbourne, Victoria, Australia, Australia
- Coordinates: 37°52′26″S 145°01′01″E
- Completed: est. between 1901-1908
- Demolished: c.2007

Tudor Court was a well-known reception centre in the Melbourne suburb of Caulfield, described as "one of [Melbourne's] favourite venues for a celebration involving hundreds of guests eating and dancing late into the night". Despite its historical and cultural value, the property failed to make the Victorian state heritage register. Rather, the value of the land it sat upon would decide its fate. The property was sold by actor Costas Kilias on 12 July 2006 for $6.4mil and a year later, in October 2007, to Becton Property Group for $12.5mil, more than double the price one year before. The iconic building was demolished in 2007, to make way for a "luxurious" 110-suite aged-care facility opened in 2014, and operated by Arcare Pty Ltd.

== History ==
Based on the New World Queen Anne Revival Style in which the original house was built, its estimated construction was between 1901 and 1908. In 1909, the property "Airdrie" was home to Isabella and John Richard Rippin, director of the Port Swettenham Rubber Company Ltd, who most likely purchased the land and commissioned the building. They hosted a wedding reception there for their adopted daughter and niece, Ida Margaret Rippin. An account of the event describes a "wide entrance hall", "drawing-room, with its white walls and tinted pink frieze", "morning-room", "billiard-room", "side lawn" and "beautiful garden". The Rippins were still living there in July 1918.

In 1922, the property was home to Arthur Leslie Harden, a merchant, and his wife, Emily. The house was named "Airdrie", possibly named after the Scottish town of Airdrie North Lanarkshire. In 1923, Frederick Sefton Holt, a manufacturer, moved in with his wife Annie Ethel, and daughter Nancy. Annie Ethel was still the proprietress in 1934. The Proprietor in 1954 was Cyril Edwin Charles Skuse.

The new ballroom renovated at a cost of £4,000 was opened as Tudor Court on 1 April 1933 with an April Fool's dance organised by the junior auxiliary of Caulfield Convalescent Hospital.
