= Shoalhaven District Memorial Hospital =

- South Eastern Sydney and Illawarra Area Health Service

Geography
- Location: Nowra, New South Wales, Australia
- Coordinates: 34°52′10″S 150°35′44″E

Organisation
- Care system: Public Medicare (AU)
- Type: District
- Affiliated university: University of Wollongong, University of New South Wales

Services
- Emergency department: Yes
- Beds: 143 (2007)

History
- Opened: 1951

Links
- Website: islhd.health.nsw.gov.au/SDMH
- Lists: Hospitals in Australia

The Shoalhaven District Memorial Hospital often shortened to Shoalhaven Hospital (abbreviated SDMH) is a public hospital serving the City of Shoalhaven in New South Wales, Australia. It is located on the banks of the Shoalhaven River 1 km (0.62 mi) from the Nowra CBD. The secondary health care facility is the main acute care hospital for the region, serving a population of over 100,000. The hospital is operated by the Illawarra Shoalhaven Local Health District In the 2009–2010 financial year, SDMH handled 21,193 hospitalisations. It is also affiliated with the University of Wollongong and University of New South Wales as a teaching hospital.

== Services ==
A 16-bed Emergency department operates 24 hours.

The hospital is equipped with an Intensive Care Unit, focusing on high dependency and coronary patients. It also operates a Rehabilitation ward, a 12-bed children's ward and a 6-bed 23-hour ward for day surgeries.

A major upgrade for oncology services was completed with the opening of the Shoalhaven Cancer Care Centre, equipped with a linear accelerator to administer radiation therapy and onsite carer's accommodation.

Other specialist services can be accessed at SDMH such as obstetrics and a maternity ward as well as clinics including physiotherapy, acute pain management, dietetics, occupational therapy and speech pathology.

Adjacent to the hospital is a helipad, facilitating evacuation flights and patient transfers. In 2010, the helipad catered to over 100 mercy flights. trauma patients are generally referred to Wollongong Hospital.

The hospital operates a library for research and education and supports patient care and training of medical students. The library was established in 1995 and its services are also accessible to staff from the David Berry and Milton Ulladulla Hospital as well as other support services operating in the district. A chapel and cafeteria are also located within the hospital complex.

== History ==
The hospital was established following the closure of two private hospitals which had previously supported the town of Nowra in the early 1950s. Prior to its establishment, the nearest public hospital had been the David Berry Hospital in Berry, 20 km (12 mi) away. It initially opened with 20 beds, but soon after opening took over the privately operated Edman maternity hospital, continuing to operate the 16 bed annexe. By the late 1980s, the hospital had grown to 125 beds including an Intensive Care Unit and paediatric ward, however this number was reduced to 96 in 1991.

SDMH opened a small renal unit in 1999 and in 2003 this was expanded to 13 dialysis chairs.

Plans were announced in 2012 for the construction of a GP superclinic and Medicare Local facilities on the hospital campus. The University of Wollongong displayed an interest in extending its educational opportunities as part of the development.

In 2013 the $34.8 million Shoalhaven Cancer Care Centre was completed and was officially opened by Jillian Skinner, the state's Health Minister. An announcement from the minister also came in October of that year that the hospital would close 12 beds in Medical Ward B for six months over the summer due to a lack demand. The community largely supported the NSW Nurses and Midwives Association's view that the move was a cost-cutting exercise which would impact on the standard of care the hospital could provide to the Shoalhaven

The state government was criticised in 2014 for allocating only 3 intern positions to SDMH, a number considerably less than other regional hospitals, citing the facilities ability to supervise the graduates.

== Statistics ==
In the 2011–2012 financial year, Shoalhaven Hospital conducted 2,962 elective surgeries and handled 34,206 Emergency Department presentations. Waiting times in the emergency department were typically shorter than the national average. Elective surgery waiting times were mostly comparable to national averages and similar hospitals in all measures except for urgent elective surgeries where according to the Australian Government's My Hospital website 86% of patients were treated within clinically recommended timeframes, compared to an average of 87% at comparable hospitals.
