= Springwood Hospital =

- Nepean Blue Mountains Local Health District

Geography
- Location: 7 Huntley Grange Rd, Springwood, New South Wales, New South Wales, Australia
- Coordinates: 33.6904724816667°S 150.57121006771723°E

Organisation
- Care system: Medicare (Australia)
- Type: Specialist
- Network: NSW Health

Services
- Emergency department: No
- Beds: 27
- Speciality: Geriatric medicine, physical medicine and rehabilitation

History
- Founded: 1976; 50 years ago

Links
- Website: www.nsw.gov.au/departments-and-agencies/nsw-health/service-directory/springwood-hospital

Springwood Hospital is a public community hospital located in Springwood in the Blue Mountains region of New South Wales, Australia. It operates within the Nepean Blue Mountains Local Health District and provides rehabilitation, aged care, and sub-acute medical services to residents of the lower Blue Mountains area.

== History ==
Springwood Hospital was opened in 1976 as a community-based facility to provide sub-acute and rehabilitative healthcare to the Springwood and broader Blue Mountains community.

== Services ==
Springwood Hospital provides a range of sub-acute, rehabilitation, and aged care services, including:

- Rehabilitation and recovery care
- Aged care inpatient services
- General medical support in cooperation with community health services

Blood samples are collected on site and sent to larger facilities for pathology; the hospital does not provide on-site radiology or pathology services.

== Emergency care ==
Springwood Hospital does not have a 24-hour emergency department. Patients requiring emergency treatment are usually directed to larger regional hospitals, including Blue Mountains District ANZAC Memorial Hospital in Katoomba or Nepean Hospital in Kingswood.

== Community role ==
Springwood Hospital serves the health needs of the Springwood township and surrounding communities, with an emphasis on rehabilitation and support for older patients and those recovering from more acute episodes of illness or surgery.

== See also ==
- List of hospitals in Australia
- Healthcare in Australia
