= Milton Ulladulla Hospital =

Geography
- Location: Milton, New South Wales, Australia
- Coordinates: type:landmark 35°19′02″S 150°26′20″E

Organisation
- Care system: Public Medicare (AU)
- Type: Local

Services
- Emergency department: Yes
- Beds: 32

History
- Opened: 1938

Links
- Website: Milton Ulladulla Hospital
- Lists: Hospitals in Australia

Milton Ulladulla Hospital (abbreviated MUH) is a local public hospital located in the town of Milton, New South Wales. The hospital services the Milton Ulladulla district in the Shoalhaven. It is located on the Princes Highway at Milton and is approximately 7 km (4.3 mi) by road from Ulladulla. MUH is operated by the Illawarra Shoalhaven Local Health District. In summer months, tourism brings a large influx of population to the region, requiring operational flexibility.

== Services ==
Milton Ulladulla Hospital has a 24-hour, 6 bed emergency room and is equipped with an operating theatre for performing minor surgeries. A general and a maternity ward are supported by a limited obstetrics capability, as well as outpatient services including oncology. Patients requiring treatment for conditions that the hospital is not equipped to handle are referred to the larger Shoalhaven District Memorial Hospital or to Wollongong Hospital.

A renal dialysis unit for the hospital has been identified as part of the Illawarra Shoalhaven Local Health District's future planning and in 2013 auxiliary support staff began community fundraising to help fast track the facility.

A helipad located off the nearby Croobyar road supports patient transfers and is operated by the hospital.

== History ==
The first hospital in the area was established in 1908 by Harold Riley, it was a basic facility which employed nurses to care for patients. In 1936 it was transferred to government control, and in 1938 was renamed to the current Milton Ulladulla Hospital. By 1967, it had outgrown the original cottage and was relocated to the current buildings with the then Governor of New South Wales Sir Roden Cutler officially opening the new facility.

Following a community appeal which began in November 2003, a cancer services centre was established to provide an outpatient oncology clinic for the community. Despite a major setback caused by fire destroying the original clinic building in March 2005, the new centre, built with community funds was transferred to the Illawarra Shoalhaven Local Health District and opened its doors in 2008.

In 2013, the hospital's maternity ward was downgraded, placing limitations on the obstetric services that are offered at MUH. This move caused tension between the hospital management and senior doctors, who claimed the hospital was under-resourced and expressed concerns about women having to travel to Nowra, 60 km (37 mi) to deliver their babies.

== Statistics ==
In figures published by the Australian Government's My Hospital website for the 2011-2012 financial year, Milton Ulladulla Hospital conducted 118 elective surgeries and handled 13,574 Emergency Department presentations. Waiting times in the emergency department were considerably shorter than the national average across all triage classifications. Elective surgeries were not compared, but the median waiting time for urgent treatment was 6 days, with 97% completed within clinically recommended timeframes.
