= The Alfred Hospital =

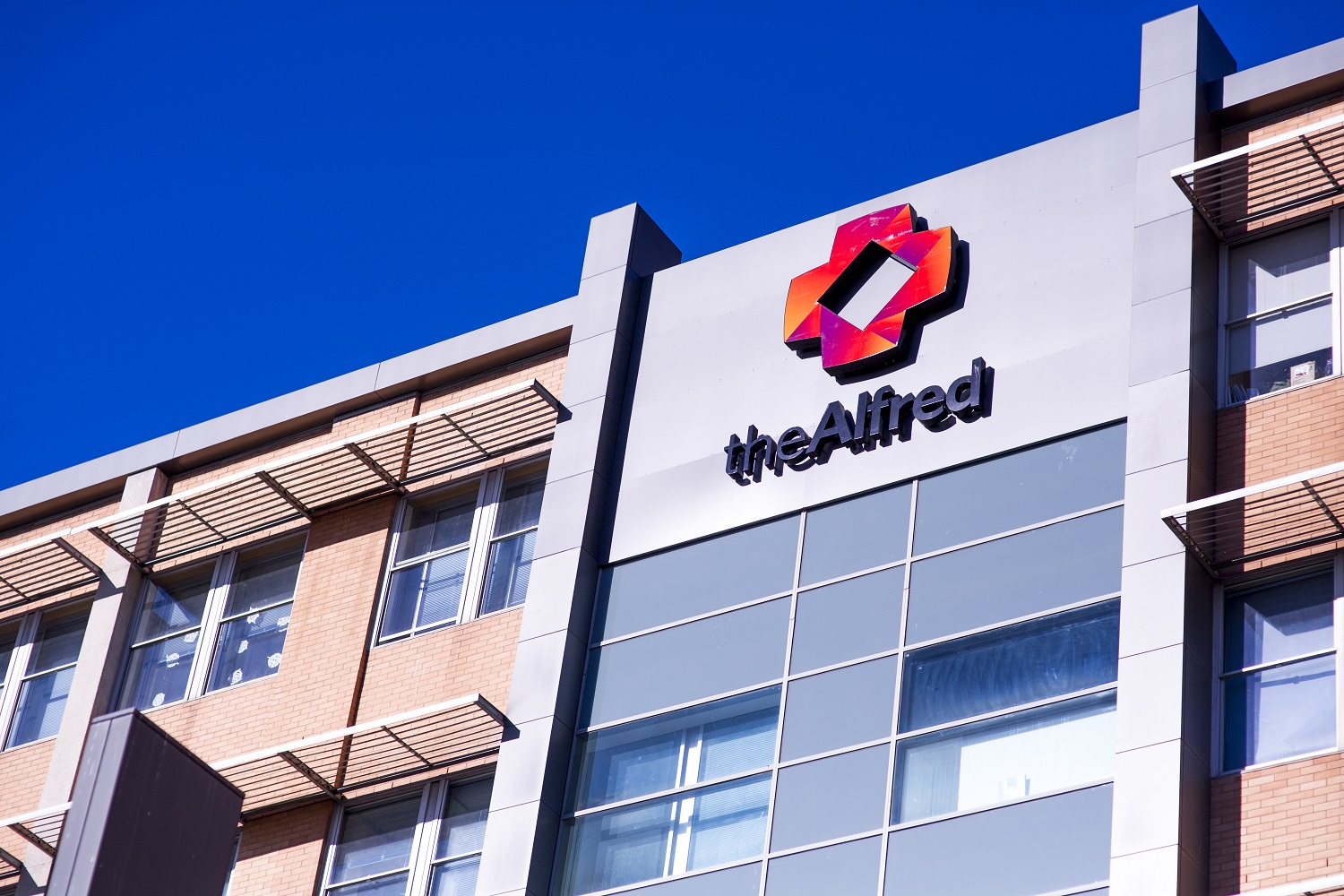

Geography
- Location: Melbourne, Victoria, Australia
- Coordinates: 37°50′46″S 144°58′58″E

Organisation
- Care system: Public
- Type: District General, Teaching
- Affiliated university: Monash University

Services
- Emergency department: Yes
- Beds: 638

Helipads
- Helipad: (ICAO: YAFD)
Number	Length		Surface
Number	ft	m	Surface
1			concrete

History
- Founded: 1871; 155 years ago

Links
- Website: www.alfred.org.au

The Alfred Hospital (also known as The Alfred or Alfred Hospital) is a tertiary hospital in Melbourne, Victoria. It is the second oldest hospital in Victoria after Melbourne Hospital which is still operating on its original site. The hospital is one of two major adult trauma centres in Victoria and houses the largest intensive care unit in Australia. In 2026, it was ranked as Australia's top hospital, as well as among the top 50 hospitals worldwide.

The Alfred Hospital is a major teaching hospital affiliated with Monash University. Alfred Health manages The Alfred Hospital along with Caulfield Hospital and Sandringham Hospital.

== History ==
The "Hospital by the Yarra", founded in 1871, was named after Prince Alfred after he was shot in an unsuccessful assassination attempt while on a royal visit to Australia. The Royal Prince Alfred Hospital in Sydney, New South Wales is also named after the prince.

In May 1956, The Alfred became the first hospital in Australia to place a patient on cardiopulmonary bypass during cardiac surgery.

== Services ==
The Alfred Hospital, part of Bayside Health, offers medical services including cancer treatment, asthma management, psychiatry, allergy care, cardiology, and neurosurgery. It houses an Intensive Care Unit and also provides facilities for adult cystic fibrosis services and an adult burns centre. The Alfred Hospital hosts both adult heart and lung transplantation services as well as a pediatric lung transplantation service.

The Alfred also collaborates with the Alfred Research Alliance, a consortium of medical research institutions located onsite.

== Specialty units ==
Some of the specialty units within The Alfred Hospital include:

- Adult Cystic Fibrosis Unit
- Allergy, Asthma and Clinical Immunology – unique in Australia
- Helen Macpherson Smith Burns Unit – unique in Victoria
- Infectious Diseases Unit – includes state HIV/AIDS service
- Lung Transplant Unit – second largest in the world
- Psychiatry Unit accommodating 60 acute inpatients, including two APICSS (Alfred Psychiatry Intensive Care Statewide Service) beds
- State Major Trauma Service – including road trauma centre
- The Heart Centre – World Health Organization Centre for Research and Training
- Largest Mechanical Circulatory Support Service in Australasia (Ventricular Assist Devices)
- Largest Adult ECMO centre in Australia
- Largest Hyperbaric unit in the Southern hemisphere
- William Buckland Radiotherapy Centre – Specialists in Brachytherapy, Stereotactic Radiosurgery and General External Beam Therapy.
- Interventional Radiology - Australia's largest uterine fibroid embolisation (UFE) program.

== Associated facilities ==
- Deakin University's Centre for Quality and Patient Safety Research

== See also ==
- List of hospitals in Australia
- Healthcare in Australia
