= Gold Coast Medical =

Australian television series

- Gold Coast Medical title card.
- Country of origin: Australia
- No. of series: 1

Production
- Production locations: Gold Coast, Australia
- Production company: McAvoy Media

Original release
- Network: Seven Network
- Release: 1 November 2016 – 15 January 2017

Gold Coast Medical is an Australian factual television which premiered on the Seven Network. The series was filmed at Gold Coast University Hospital and follows the work done by staff in the Gold Coast's largest hospital. Ten episodes of the program have been produced.

The Seven Network previously screened a similar medical factual series Medical Emergency in 2005.

== Broadcast ==
The series was due to air on the Seven Network in September 2015 however its debut was delayed for over a year, and given a new start date of 25 October 2016. The program was again delayed with a revised premiere date of 1 November 2016.

Distributed internationally by Lineup Industries, the series was acquired by Pick in the United Kingdom.

== Episodes ==
No.	Title	Original release date	Australian viewers
1	Episode 1	1 November 2016	609,000
2	Episode 2	8 November 2016	566,000
3	Episode 3	15 November 2016	584,000
4	Episode 4	30 November 2016	577,000
5	Episode 5	14 December 2016	519,000
6	Episode 6	21 December 2016	365,000
7	Episode 7	28 December 2016	457,000
8	Episode 8	8 January 2017	548,000
9	Episode 9	11 January 2017	439,000
10	Episode 10	15 January 2017	574,000
