= St John of God Hospital Richmond =

- St John of God Health Care

Geography
- Location: North Richmond, New South Wales, Australia
- Coordinates: 33.593876°S 150.702030°E

Organisation
- Type: Specialist
- Religious affiliation: Catholic Church

Services
- Speciality: Mental health hospital

History
- Opened: 1951

Links
- Lists: Hospitals in Australia

St John of God Hospital Richmond is a private mental health hospital which provides mental health care on an inpatient, day patient and outpatient basis. It is located in North Richmond, New South Wales.

The original hospital building was purchased in 1951 and in 2007 the hospital became part of St John of God Health Care following a merger between the health care group and the services of the Hospitaller Order of St John of God.

St John of God Richmond Hospital is a division of St John of God Health Care, a Catholic not-for-profit health care group, serving communities with hospitals, home nursing, and social outreach services throughout Australia, New Zealand and the wider Asia-Pacific region.

== Facilities ==
St John of God Hospital Richmond houses 88 patient beds and a Counselling and Therapy Centre. The hospital also operates specialised medical consulting rooms at the adjacent Medical Centre.

== Services ==
St John of God Richmond Hospital offers a number of services for people suffering from mental health issues, including:

- Anxiety and depression
- Drug and alcohol addiction
- Obsessive–compulsive disorder
- Older adult mental health issues
- Post-traumatic stress disorder (PTSD)

== Research ==
In 2010, St John of God Hospital Richmond registered a clinical trial intended to study the effects of exercise on post-traumatic stress disorder entitled “Randomised control trial of the effectiveness of augmentation in patients with PTSD”. Research in the field of post-traumatic stress disorder continues, and is led by Professor Zachary Steel.

== See also ==
- List of hospitals in Australia
- List of hospitals in New Zealand
