= Preston & Northcote Community Hospital =

Geography
- Location: corner of Hotham and Bell Streets, Preston, Australia
- Coordinates: 37°44′47″S 145°0′32″E

Services
- Beds: 304

History
- Founded: 1958; Officially opened: 3 July 1960
- Closed: April 1999

Links
- Lists: Hospitals in Australia

The Preston & Northcote Community Hospital (often referred to as PANCH) was a former hospital located in Preston, Victoria, Australia, opened in 1958 and relocated to the Northern Hospital in Epping in February 1998. PANCH was located on the corner of Bell and Hotham Streets. The site was sold off in April 1999, and part of the 30,000-square-metre (320,000 sq ft) site is now occupied by Bell City Centre which is a residential facility, student accommodation and host of two hotels a part of the Mantra Group.

Fixtures from the hospital were removed by volunteers to help rebuild a community hospital in Suai, East Timor. The hospital's former operating theatres were used for a play on genetic engineering named The Teratology Project in 2002.

A new facility called the PANCH Health Service was established in 2003 by the State Government to address a shortage of medical services in the area. This State Government health service, which is located opposite the old PANCH site, is named out of nostalgia and is not directly connected with the former Preston & Northcote Community Hospital.

== Arms ==
Coat of arms of Preston & Northcote Community Hospital
Notes Granted 17 September 1962. Crest On a Wreath Argent and Gules a dove Argent environed by a serpent the head in sinister chief facing to the dexter Vert. Escutcheon Tierced in pairle reversed Vert Gules and Sable a mullet of seven points irradiated Or. Motto Sapiens et Mitis
