= Bowral and District Hospital =

- South Western Sydney Local Health District
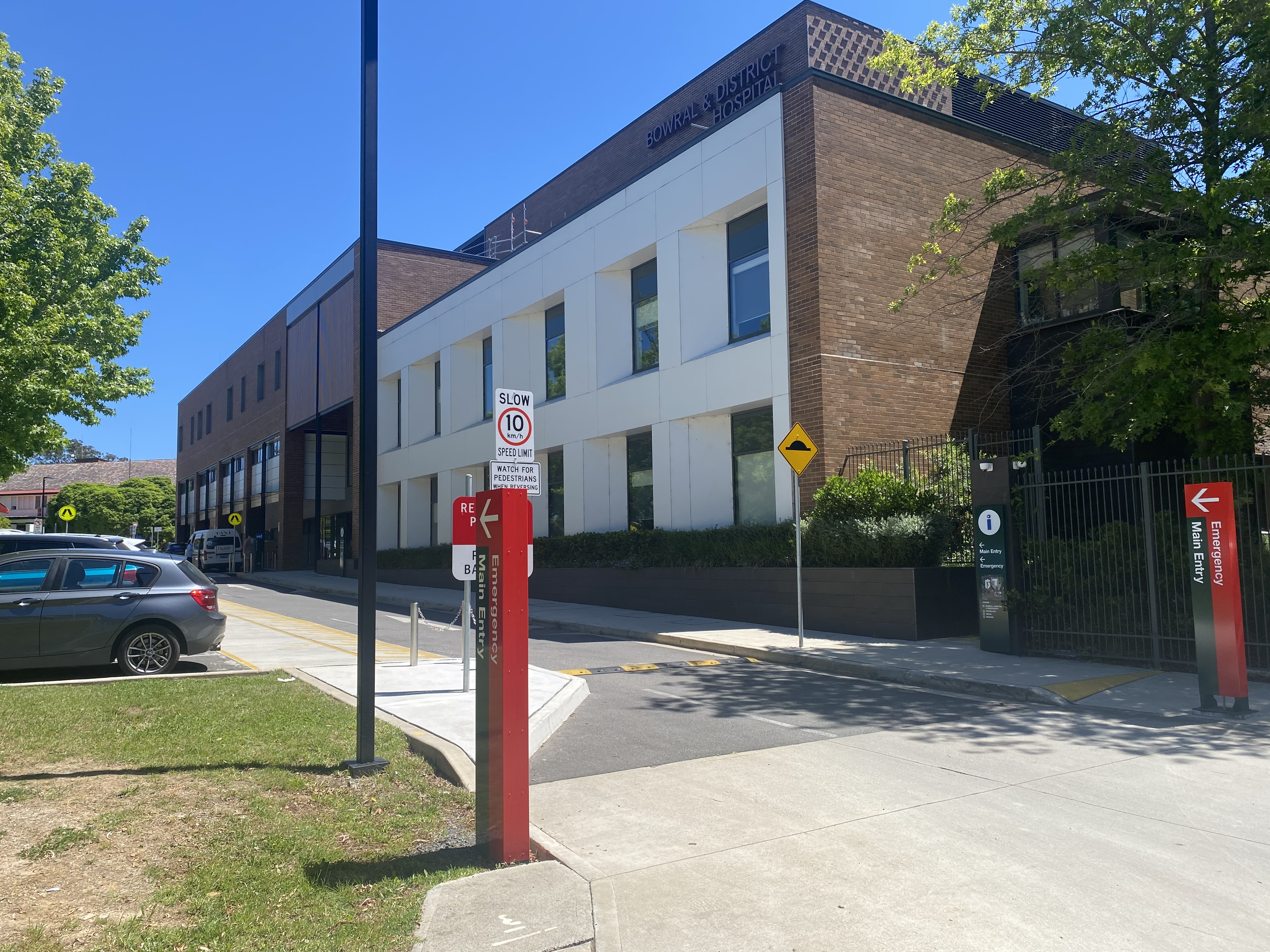
- Bowral and District Hospital

Geography
- Location: Bowral, New South Wales, Australia
- Coordinates: type:hospital 34°29′06″S 150°25′25″E

Organisation
- Care system: Public Medicare (AU)
- Type: Community

Services
- Emergency department: Yes
- Beds: 94

History
- Founded: 1889

Links
- Website: Official Website
- Lists: Hospitals in Australia

Bowral and District Hospital is a community hospital is servicing the Southern Highlands region in New South Wales, Australia. The hospital is centrally located in the town of Bowral and is the only hospital operated outside the Sydney metropolitan area by the South Western Sydney Local Health District.

== Services ==
Within the main building - the Milton Park Wing, Bowral and District Hospital provides a 24-hour emergency department with 12 beds. A further 8 beds are allocated to a high dependency unit for patients with conditions that require continuous monitoring. The hospital has maintained a paediatric ward since 1935 and the current facility provides 8 beds supported by two full-time paediatricians. The hospital's Obstetrics Department is centred on maternity ward providing 2 birthing rooms and 5 post-natal beds. 36 general medical and surgical beds occupy the remainder of the building.

The Cardiac Assessment Unit was established in 1985, providing rehabilitation and outpatient services for patients with heart conditions is located in a separate annex of the property known as the Watson Unit. This facility also provides a range of clinics and outpatient services.

=== Bowral Mental Health Service ===
The Bowral Mental Health Service provides an adolescent mental health facility at the hospital. This service caters for 12- to 17-year-old patients who experience mental health issues, offering assessment, counseling and support for clients. The hospital also acts as an after hours point of contact for mental health concerns for all ages and is able to coordinate care through a number of support programs offered by the service. Additionally the hospital has two dedicated beds for patients admitted for mental health reasons, and is regularly attended by visiting psychiatrists who are able to provide clinical consultations.

== History ==
In the absence of a hospital between Sydney and Goulburn, community leaders identified the need to establish a local facility and the search began for an appropriate site in 1886. In March 1888 5.5 acres (2.2 ha) of land was purchased using funds raised from within the community. Construction of the building designed by architect H.C. Kent began the following January, opening on 4 September 1889 as the Berrima District Cottage Hospital. The first major expansion to the hospital was an operating theatre opened in 1898.

The hospital was significantly upgraded in 1911, expanding the two bedroom nurses quarters which had been added in 1902 and increasing the capacity of the women's ward to 8 beds. As part of these works, Berrima District Hospital was connected to gas mains allowing kerosene lanterns to be replaced. In 1919, the hospital was renamed Berrimah District Hospital and had expanded to occupy 10 acres (4.0 ha). Electricity was connected to the facility in 1925. A significant boost in funding for the hospital was provided in March 1926, with the institution benefited from a legacy of £3 million from the will of a Miss C.B. Smith. An isolation ward followed in 1928. The following year an ambulance service was established, cementing the hospital's role as a hub for healthcare in the region.

The hospital had outgrown the original buildings by 1935 and was relocated to a modern complex taking advantages of advances in medicine. It was opened by Member for Wollondilly Mark Morton and incorporated men's, women's and children's wards, operating theatres and dedicated areas housing anesthesia and X-ray departments.

The Milton Park Wing was developed in 1959 and remains as the main surgical ward. Further extension of the hospital facilities in the 1960s added a dedicated maternity ward and emergency department. Reflecting the growth of Bowral as the regional centre of the Southern Highlands, the hospital's name was changed to Bowral and District Hospital in 1968. Throughout the 1970s and 80s, the range of specialist services provided by the hospital was expanded, including the addition of rehabilitation and cardiac units.

During the 1990s, the hospital sold undeveloped land on the north west of the site allowing the development of the Southern Highlands Private Hospital, which opened in 1996. In 1998, the hospital received additional funding allowing the allocation of two beds for patients with sub-acute mental illness, although the hospital does not maintain a full-time psychiatric capability.

In 2017, NSW Health announced that a $50 million upgrade of the hospital. As of 2021, this upgrade is now complete. The upgrade added new operating theatres, more birthing suites, more single rooms with ensuites. Additionally, the upgrades moved the main entrance of the hospital/emergency ward to the Western side of the facility adjacent to Mona Road.

== Transport ==
Bowral and District Hospital is well serviced by public transport links provided by Berrima Buslines throughout the Southern Highlands. The hospital is served directly by local routes 811, 814 and 815 six days per week. Route 811 provides connections to Bowral railway station and the other major suburbs around the Southern Highlands . Route 808, 814 and 815 buses also stop at the hospital, providing links to the rural villages of Kangaloon, Robertson and around Bowral.

== Statistics ==
According to the Australian Government's My Hospital website Bowral and District Hospital performed 1,375 elective surgeries and handled 17,403 emergency department presentations in the 2011-2012 financial year. Emergency department waiting times were significantly shorter than national averages. This trend was also reflected in waiting times for elective surgeries, with all urgent procedures performed within clinically recommended timeframes. The hospital's 2010 operating budget was $22.57 million.
