= Blue Mountains District ANZAC Memorial Hospital =

- Nepean Blue Mountains Local Health District

Geography
- Location: 1 Woodlands Rd, Katoomba, New South Wales, Australia
- Coordinates: 33.7048858288466°S 150.3210098534752°E

Organisation
- Care system: Medicare (Australia)
- Type: District Hospital
- Network: NSW Health

Services
- Emergency department: Yes
- Beds: 110

Helipads
- Helipad: ICAO: YXBM
Number	Length		Surface
Number	ft	m	Surface
1			Concrete

History
- Opened: June 1927; 99 years ago

Links
- Website: www.nsw.gov.au/departments-and-agencies/nbmlhd/locations/blue-mountains-hospital

Blue Mountains District ANZAC Memorial Hospital is a public acute hospital located in Katoomba, New South Wales, Australia. The hospital forms part of the Nepean Blue Mountains Local Health District and provides healthcare services to residents of the Blue Mountains region, including 24-hour emergency care, inpatient and outpatient services, allied health, and specialist clinics. .

The hospital has an approximate capacity of 110–113 beds, including a dedicated mental health unit. The hospital is notable as one of the few functioning war memorial hospitals in Australia and the only remaining ANZAC memorial hospital in New South Wales.

== History ==
The origins of Blue Mountains District ANZAC Memorial Hospital date to the early 20th century, following community advocacy for a local hospital to serve the growing population of the Blue Mountains. After World War I, the decision was made to establish the hospital as a living memorial to local servicemen who died during the conflict.

Land for the hospital was donated by the New South Wales Government and private estates. The foundation stone was laid in October 1925, and the hospital began admitting patients in June 1927. The official opening ceremony was held in October 1928.

Over subsequent decades, the hospital underwent a number of expansions and upgrades, including the addition of maternity services, surgical facilities, rehabilitation wards, and diagnostic services. Modernisation projects in the late 20th and early 21st centuries introduced updated emergency, outpatient, and mental health facilities while retaining the hospital’s commemorative role.

== Services ==
Blue Mountains District ANZAC Memorial Hospital operates as a 24-hour emergency department and provides a range of clinical services, including:

- Emergency care
- Inpatient and outpatient medical services
- Allied health services
- Women’s and children’s health services
- Mental health and sexual health services
- Diagnostic imaging and pathology
- Minor surgical procedures

The hospital works in coordination with other facilities within the Nepean Blue Mountains Local Health District, including Springwood Hospital and Nepean Hospital.

== Community and cultural significance ==
As an ANZAC memorial hospital, the facility holds historical and cultural significance for the Blue Mountains community. Memorial plaques and commemorative spaces within the hospital honour local service personnel, reflecting the hospital’s dual role as both a healthcare institution and a war memorial.

Community fundraising and local support have historically contributed to the hospital’s development and ongoing enhancement of services.

== Controversies and issues ==
While Blue Mountains District ANZAC Memorial Hospital has not been the subject of major clinical scandals, several issues and controversies have been reported in historical and contemporary sources.

=== Royal opening controversy ===
At the time of the hospital’s establishment, controversy arose in the local community regarding the involvement of British royalty in commemorative events. Debate was reported in local newspapers over the appropriateness of royal participation in ceremonies associated with a community-funded ANZAC memorial hospital, reflecting broader post-war political and cultural tensions of the period.

=== Asbestos management concerns ===
In the 2010s, concerns were raised in media reporting regarding the presence of asbestos-containing materials within parts of the hospital complex. Reports indicated that asbestos had been identified in multiple areas of the site, prompting investigation into asbestos management practices and workplace safety controls. These reports formed part of broader scrutiny of asbestos management across public facilities in the Blue Mountains region.

=== Infrastructure and service capacity concerns ===
The age of the hospital’s infrastructure has been a recurring topic in local political debate and community advocacy. Media and parliamentary commentary have highlighted challenges associated with maintaining and upgrading an ageing hospital campus, with calls for redevelopment or replacement facilities to better meet modern healthcare standards and population growth in the Blue Mountains region.

The hospital and its governing body, the Nepean Blue Mountains Local Health District, maintain formal mechanisms for addressing patient, staff, and community concerns in accordance with New South Wales Health policies.

== Location ==
The hospital is located at the intersection of the Great Western Highway and Woodlands Road in Katoomba. It serves the Blue Mountains region as part of the New South Wales public health system.

== See also ==
- Healthcare in Australia
- List of hospitals in New South Wales
- List of hospitals in Australia
- Lists of hospitals
