= Lismore Base Hospital =

- Northern New South Wales Local Health District

Geography
- Location: Lismore, Northern Rivers, New South Wales, Australia
- Coordinates: 28.8092°S 153.2913°E

Organisation
- Care system: Public (Medicare)
- Type: Teaching
- Affiliated university: University of Newcastle; University of Sydney; Western Sydney University; University of Wollongong; Bond University; University of Queensland; Griffith University

Services
- Emergency department: Yes
- Beds: 260

Helipads
- Helipad: (ICAO: YLIH)
Number	Length		Surface
Number	ft	m	Surface
1			concrete

History
- Founded: 1879

Links
- Website: nnswlhd.health.nsw.gov.au/about/hospitals/lismore-base-hospital/
- Lists: Hospitals in Australia

Lismore Base Hospital is a major public teaching hospital in the Northern Rivers region of New South Wales, Australia, located in the city of Lismore. It has approximately 280 beds, and serves as the primary hospital and recognised trauma centre for the Northern New South Wales Local Health District. Due to its size and location, the hospital also serves as a rural teaching hospital for many universities based in metropolitan New South Wales and Queensland. Its primary referral area consists of the Clarence and Richmond valleys, which has a population of approximately 180,000 people.

== Services ==
As a tertiary level referral hospital, Lismore Base Hospital grants the residents of the Northern Rivers region access to many specialist services beyond the scope of district hospital care. Offering advanced perioperative, emergency, trauma and elective surgical services, the hospital undertakes over 8,100 procedures annually including vascular and upper gastrointestinal surgeries. Additionally, the hospital provides diagnostic and interventional cardiology through its cardiac catheter laboratory and coronary care unit, has adult, adolescent and child mental health facilities, and is home to the North Coast Cancer Institute, which provides advanced oncological and haematological support to patients. Outpatient services include pain management services, and a needle exchange program unique to the region.

== History ==
=== District hospital ===
Originally known as the "Lismore and Richmond River Hospital", Lismore Base Hospital was opened in 1879 with a total of eight beds, one matron and one wardsman. By this time the surrounding region had already been settled by Europeans for thirty-six years, and Lismore itself had been declared a town by the government in 1856. With the population of the surrounding districts continuing to grow through the late nineteenth century, the hospital saw an increase in patients presenting with construction injuries and infectious diseases, and had to use tents as isolation wards before more permanent accommodation could be constructed. By 1904, in response to the ever growing number of patients, a brick building was finished containing new wards and an operating theatre. Expansion was minimal for the next sixteen years when in 1920 the hospital received a new maternity ward and electric lighting. Further development of the campus was sporadic, with the opening of a paediatric ward in 1936, an improved maternity ward in 1947, and a ten bed tuberculosis unit in 1956. In 1967 a new hospital block was constructed, which increased the number of wards, operating theatres and X-ray units. More importantly, it freed up space in some of the old wards for conversion into an emergency department, pharmacy and outpatient clinic, which opened in 1969.

=== Tertiary and teaching hospital ===
Over the following forty years the hospital continued to slowly expand as the regional population grew, acquiring more advanced rehabilitation, mental health, oncology and cardiology services.

In October 2013 a major redevelopment (3a) of the hospital began. The project is budgeted at A$80.25 million and due to be completed in late 2016. This will be followed by Stage 3B budgeted at A$180 million.

On 29 November 2015 a severe hail storm caused scaffolding to collapse onto the roof of the hospital. As a result, the internal ceiling in the maternity ward fell in. There were no injuries.
