= Belmont Hospital =

Belmont District Hospital

Geography
- Location: Belmont, New South Wales, Australia
- Coordinates: type:hospital 33°01′29″S 151°38′54″E

Organisation
- Care system: Public Medicare (AU)
- Type: District

Services
- Emergency department: Yes
- Beds: 75

History
- Opened: 1968

Links
- Lists: Hospitals in Australia

Belmont Hospital is an acute care public hospital servicing the City of Lake Macquarie in New South Wales, Australia. Established in 1968, it is the only public hospital in the Local Government Area and is located on Croudace Bay Road in the suburb of Belmont. The hospital is operated by the Hunter New England Local Health District. The hospital underwent a major $31.5 million redevelopment between 2003 and 2007 allowing it to expand the range of specialist services available.

== Services ==
The hospital's 24-hour emergency department was rebuilt in 2003 and is able to cater for adults and children. Despite this there are no specialist paediatric services located at the hospital, requiring that children be transferred to the John Hunter Children's Hospital should they be admitted. Other conditions which Belmont Hospital is not equipped to handle, including trauma are referred to John Hunter Hospital.

In addition to general medical and surgical wards, the hospital offers specialist services, notably coronary care and gynaecology. Orthopedic and respiratory conditions can also be treated. The hospital opened a 16 bed sub-acute unit in 2012 which allows patients to remain in hospital after treatment, assisting with recovery and freeing up resources for more seriously ill patients. A 20 bed transitional care unit was relocated to Belmont from Royal Newcastle Hospital in 2006, providing care for elderly patients awaiting placement in aged care facilities.

There are a range of allied health services accessible at Belmont Hospital, including physiotherapy, occupational therapy, dietetics, social work and speech pathology. Diagnostic services include pathology and radiology.

== Statistics ==
Figures published on the Australian Government's My Hospital website for the 2011-2012 financial year, Belmont Hospital performed 2,457 elective surgeries and handled 24,711 Emergency Department presentations. Waiting times in the emergency department were generally shorter than the national average, except non-urgent surgery cases where the hospital performed at the national average. Waiting times for elective surgeries at Belmont were very short, with the hospital performing 99% of procedures within clinically recommended timeframes. The hospital's 2010 operating budget was $26.99 million.
