= Monash Children's Hospital =

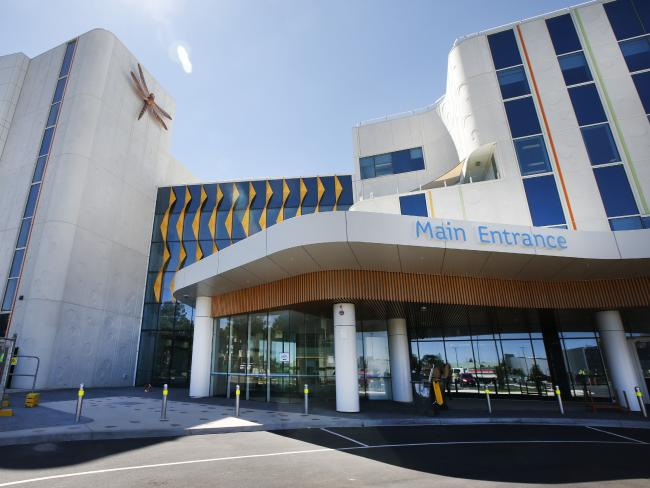

Geography
- Location: Melbourne, Victoria, Australia
- Coordinates: 37°55′10″S 145°7′24″E

Organisation
- Care system: Public Medicare (AU)
- Type: Specialist paediatric
- Affiliated university: Monash University and Hudson Institute of Medical Research

Services
- Beds: 230

Helipads
- Helipad: (ICAO: YXXM)
Number	Length		Surface
Number	ft	m	Surface
1			aluminium

History
- Founded: 1896, 2017 present site

Links
- Website: www.monashchildrenshospital.org
- Lists: Hospitals in Australia

Monash Children's Hospital is a children's hospital in Melbourne, Australia. It is part of Monash Medical Centre. It includes Victoria's largest Neonatal Intensive Care Unit. It is home to Victoria's only dedicated children's sleep science, is a state-wide referral service for thalassemia, and is a provider of fetal surgery services in partnership with Royal Women's Hospital and Mercy Hospital for Women, Melbourne. Its services are linked to an adult service, allowing the hospital to provide transition-of-care as children grow older and move to an adult service.

== New Monash Children's Hospital ==
After providing services from within adult hospitals for many years, in 2017 the purpose-built Monash Children's Hospital was opened in Clayton, Victoria.

Monash Children's Hospital is located alongside Monash Medical Centre, and includes the Monash Children's Hospital School.

The New Monash Children's Hospital service profile includes:

- 96 In-patient acute beds
- 10 Paediatric Intensive care beds
- 64 Monash Newborn cots
- 20 Early in Life Mental Health Service beds
- 8 Neuro Developmental Psychiatry beds
- 20 Same-day beds
- 12 Oncology same-day beds – 12
- 3 Operating theatres – plus a dedicated Endoscopy Suite
- Sleep and Neurodiagnostic studies beds
- Imaging Modalities – 3 modalities (MRI, Ultrasound and X-Ray)
- Outpatient consulting rooms and Allied Health Therapy spaces
- Dedicated Central Sterilising Services Department (CSSD)
- A Starlight Children's Foundation Room
- A Ronald McDonald House Charities Family Room
- A Hoyts beanbag cinema for patients
- A Radio Lollipop studio
