= St Helens District Hospital =

District Hospital in Tasmania, Australia

St Helens, Tasmania

Geography
- Location: St Helens, Break O'Day, Tasmania, Australia
- Coordinates: 41.3180515°S 148.2418906°E

Organisation
- Type: District

Helipads
- Helipad: No

History
- Opened: 1975, (Note: Original location) 2019 (Note: New location)
- Closed: 2019 (Note: Closed and moved to a different location in St Helens)

Links
- Website: Official Website
- Lists: Hospitals in Australia

The St Helens District Hospital (Note: also known as the St Helens District Hospital and Community Centre) is a public hospital owned by the Tasmanian Government, located in St Helens, Tasmania.

The original location opened in 1975 on Bowen Street, and Circassian Street, behind the Bay of Fires IGA but shut down in 2019 which relocated on Annie Street.

== History ==
The District Hospital opened in 1975 on Bowen Street, and Circassian Street (41.3233109°S 148.2484197°E) which was a small, white brick building which had the colour blue on some parts of the building which also had solar panels which would have been added in the 2010s. It had 10 beds in the old hospital, which also contained an emergency drive-way. On 8 May, 2019, the district hospital moved locations onto Annie Street. The purpose was actually not to upgrade the building, but rather change locations to a area in St Helens where it would less likely flood unlike the original location. The cost of the relocation was A$12 million in which construction started in 2017, which then opened on 8 May, 2019. The same number of beds were put in the new location just like the old location, but was built to be a modern-like hospital containing more privacy.
