= Wollongong Hospital =

- Illawarra Shoalhaven Local Health District
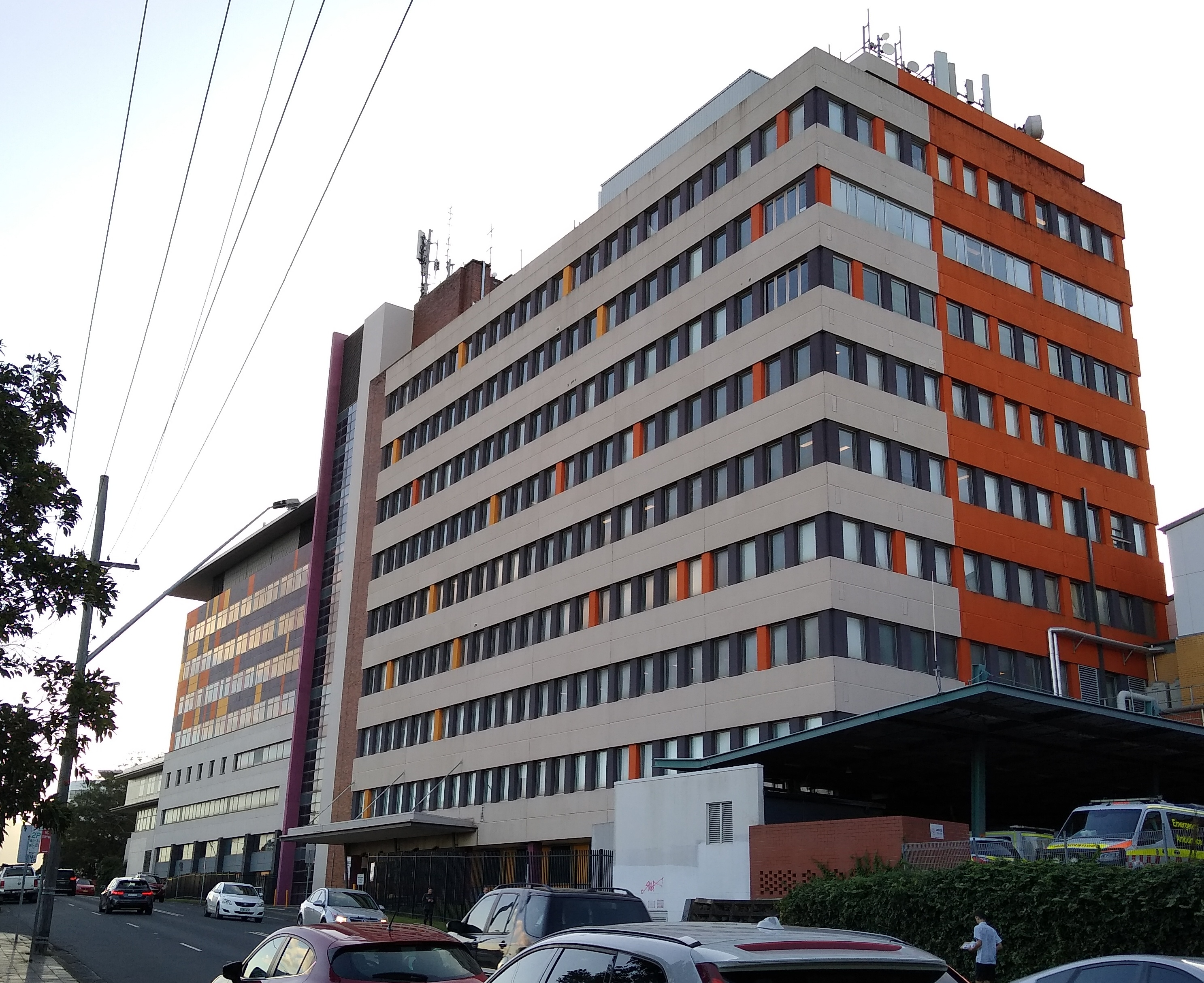

Geography
- Location: Crown Street, Wollongong, New South Wales, Illawarra, NSW, Australia
- Coordinates: 34.4249°S 150.8827°E

Organisation
- Care system: Public Medicare (AU)
- Type: Teaching
- Affiliated university: University of Wollongong

Services
- Emergency department: Yes
- Beds: more than 500

Helipads
- Helipad: (ICAO: YXWL)
Number	Length		Surface
Number	ft	m	Surface
1			concrete

Links
- Website: https://www.islhd.health.nsw.gov.au/hospitals/wollongong-hospital
- Lists: Hospitals in Australia

Wollongong Hospital is the major tertiary referral hospital located in the Wollongong Metropolitan area, New South Wales, Australia. It provides services to the entire Illawarra and Shoalhaven Region, encompassing a population of approximately 350,000.

Wollongong Hospital has the capacity to treat complex and specialist cases. It provides all medical specialties including 24/7 cardiac intervention, aged care, pediatrics, and all surgical specialties except cardio-thoracic surgery. The emergency Department in Wollongong Hospital is also one of the busiest in New South Wales, with around 50,000 case presentations annually.

Wollongong Hospital is also the principal teaching hospital for Wollongong University Graduate School of Medicine and School of Nursing and Midwifery. The hospital is closely affiliated with the Illawarra Health and Medical Research Institute, providing research opportunities to address regional health issues and to improve clinical practice and health service delivery in the region and beyond.
