= Caulfield Hospital =

Coordinates: 37.8841°S 145.0159°E

- Alfred Health

Geography
- Location: Melbourne, Victoria, Australia

Organisation
- Care system: Public

Services
- Emergency department: No

Links
- Website: https://www.alfredhealth.org.au/caulfield

Caulfield Hospital is a hospital based in Melbourne, Victoria, originally opened as the No. 11 Australian General Hospital in 1916. It focuses on rehabilitation, care, and mental health, particularly for the elderly. It is situated on Kooyong Road.

Caulfield Hospital is managed by Alfred Health, operating alongside The Alfred Hospital and Sandringham Hospital.

== History ==
In 1915, the federal government acquired a white mansion on Kooyong Road. It had been built and served as the town house of the Riverina pastoralist Henry Ricketson and his family.

No. 11 Australian General Hospital was opened on 17 April 1916 in the building. It was the largest of the three Victorian repatriation hospitals the federal government operated during World War I. The Australian Red Cross built a 'rest home' near the original building in August 1916, where Red Cross volunteers could tend to recuperating servicemen.

In May of 1917, a new tennis court was opened on the grounds.

The facility was re-opened as the Kooyong Military Hospital on 18 March 1918.

A committee led by Mrs. Morris, wife of the Mayor of Caulfield, raised funds for the hospital in 1925.

Nurses' residence 'Caulfield House' opened in 1936 and was expanded in 1937.

The hospital was known at various times as Caulfield Convalescent Hospital, Caulfield Repatriation Hospital, and the General Military Hospital at Caulfield.

In 1948, management of much of the facility was assumed by the state government's Alfred Hospital.

The original mansion was demolished in 1965, and the Victorian government purchased the last parts of the site from the federal Repatriation Department. The state then opened the Southern Memorial Hospital at the site in 1968.

In 1979, the Red Cross Rest Home was renovated and transferred to the state government. This became the Montgomery Nursing Home in 2001. The building was granted a heritage listing by the state government in 2016.

The hospital continues to operate on its original site today, as Caulfield Hospital. It retains a focus on rehabilitation.

== Services ==
Caulfield Hospital maintains a primary focus on rehabilitation and care. In particular, the hospital provides aged care services, rehabilitation centres for patients affected by brain injuries, care for amputees, and general mental health services, with a specialised aged mental health department.

== See also ==
- List of hospitals in Australia
- Health care in Australia
- The Alfred Hospital
