= Gold Coast University Hospital =

- Gold Coast Hospital and Health Service
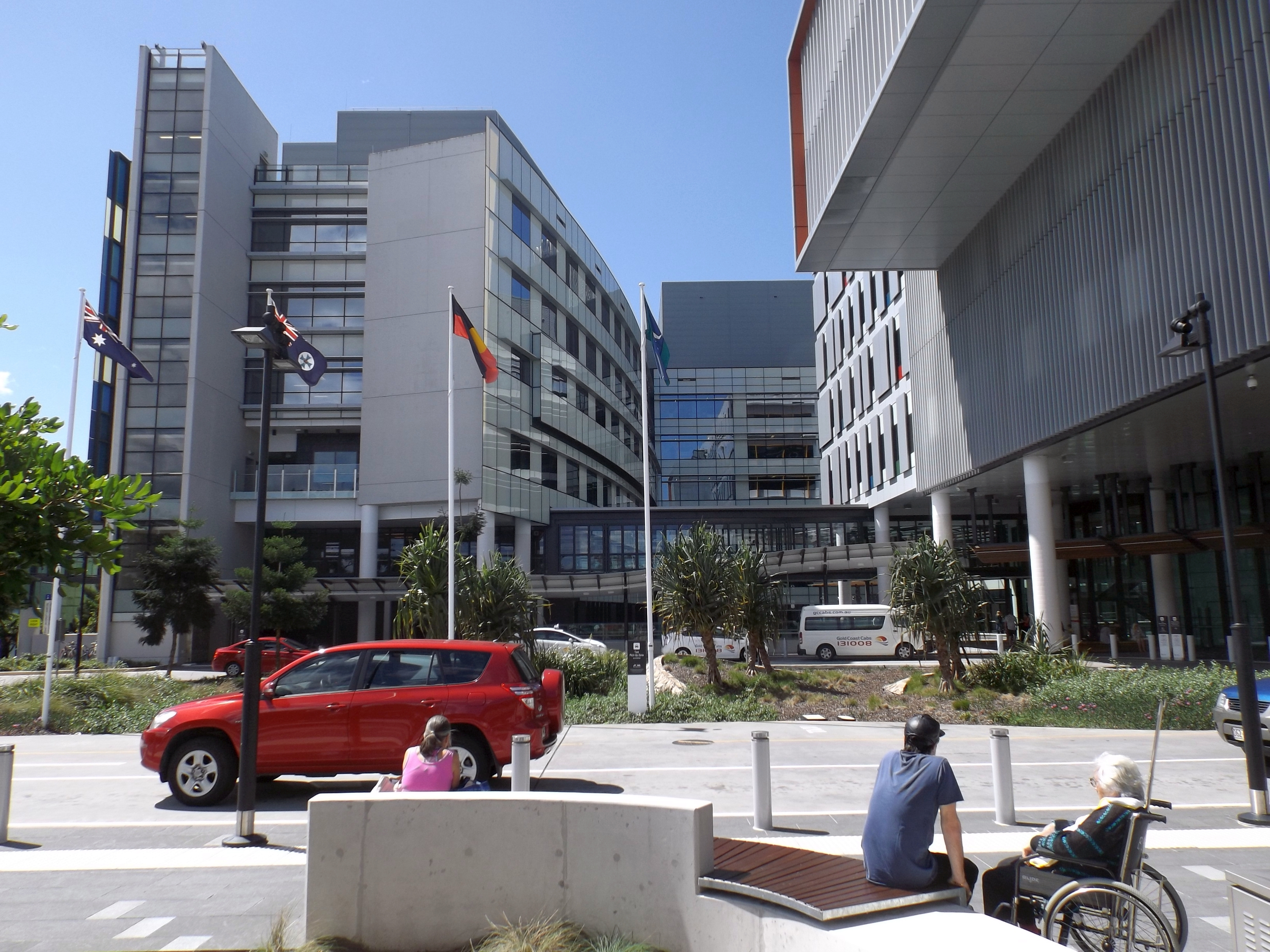
- Main entrance (non-emergency), 2015

Geography
- Location: 1 Hospital Boulevard, off Parklands Drive, Southport, Gold Coast, Queensland, Australia
- Coordinates: 27.959799°S 153.381758°E

Organisation
- Type: Teaching
- Affiliated university: Griffith University, Bond University

Services
- Emergency department: Yes
- Beds: 924

Helipads
- Helipad: ICAO : YXHG
Number	Length		Surface
Number	ft	m	Surface
1			aluminium

History
- Founded: 2013

Links
- Website: Hospital Website
- Lists: Hospitals in Australia

Gold Coast University Hospital (GCUH or GCH), also simply known as Gold Coast Uni Hospital, is a major teaching hospital and a tertiary-level district general hospital on the Gold Coast, Queensland, Australia, opened on 28 September 2013. The hospital was built on a greenfield site adjacent to Griffith University's Gold Coast campus at a cost of approximately A$1.8 billion.

== History ==
Construction commenced on 16 December 2008 when Queensland Premier Anna Bligh turned the first sod. The land was previously occupied by a church, a section of the Southport Lawn Cemetery, and undeveloped acreage. Bovis Lend Lease built the hospital.

The university hospital incorporated new specialist services including cardiac surgery, neurosciences, trauma and neonatal intensive care; these were not available at the previous Gold Coast Hospital. The hospital has seven main buildings, with a total floor space of approximately 170,000 m^{2} (1,800,000 sq ft) (excluding car parks). The main nine-level-high building is topped with a helicopter landing site.

On 27 September 2013, Queensland Health officially shut down services at the Gold Coast Hospital, and transferred the remaining patients from the old Gold Coast Hospital to the new Gold Coast University Hospital.

In early 2023, the Queensland Government announced that $72 million would be invested into the Gold Coast University Hospital sub-acute expansion project. This project would bring three new wards to provide 70 extra sub-acute beds to care for patients with complex behavioural issues. Broad Construction was awarded the tender for the project.

== Location ==
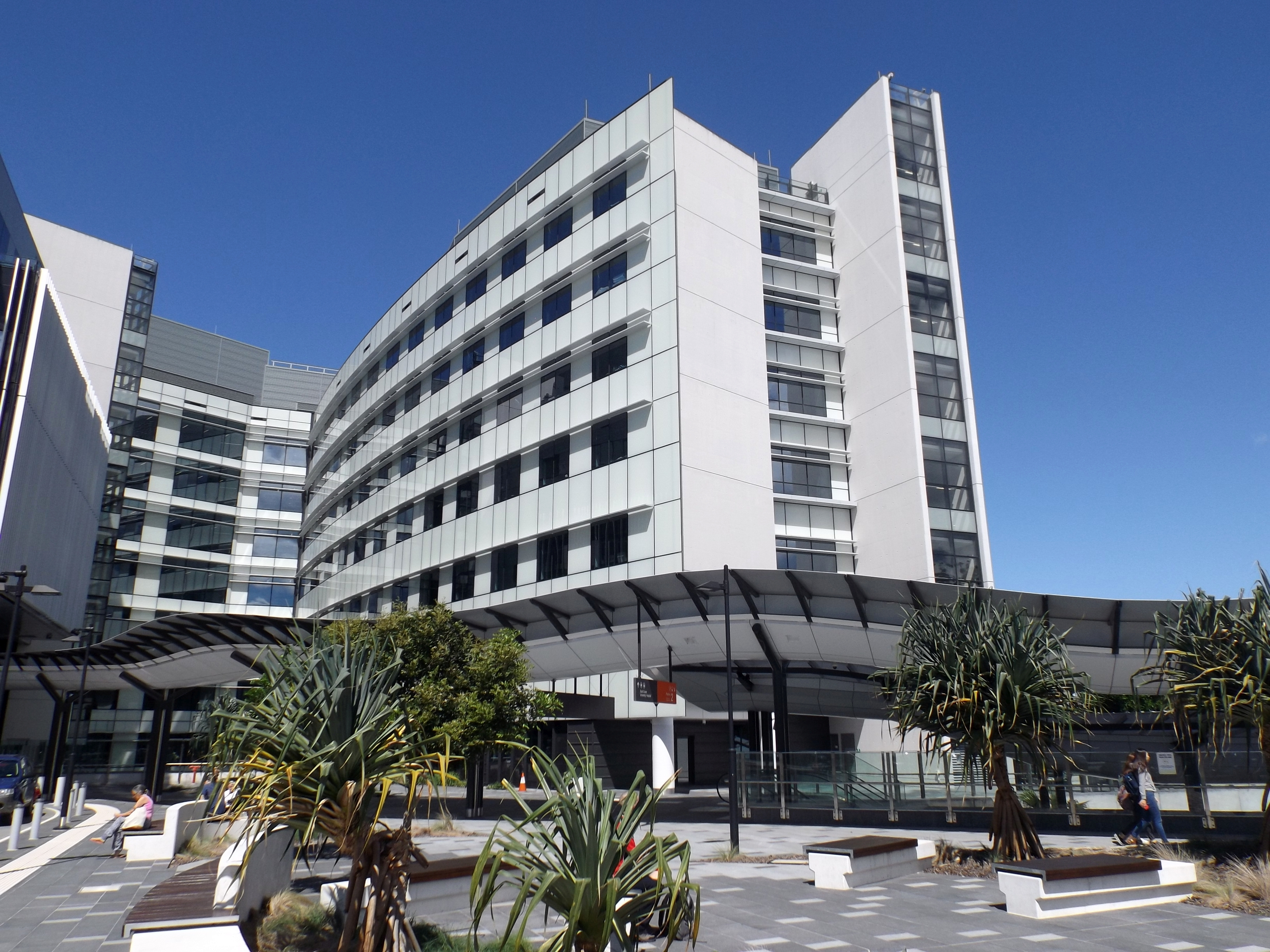
C Block West, 2015

The hospital is located on 1 Hospital Boulevard, off Parklands Drive, Southport, adjacent to Olsen Ave. A multi story car park is provided for patients and visitors and is located across the road from the main hospital building. The Gold Coast University Hospital is co-located with Griffith University and new Gold Coast Private Hospital, forming the Gold Coast's 'Health and Knowledge Precinct'.

=== Public transport ===
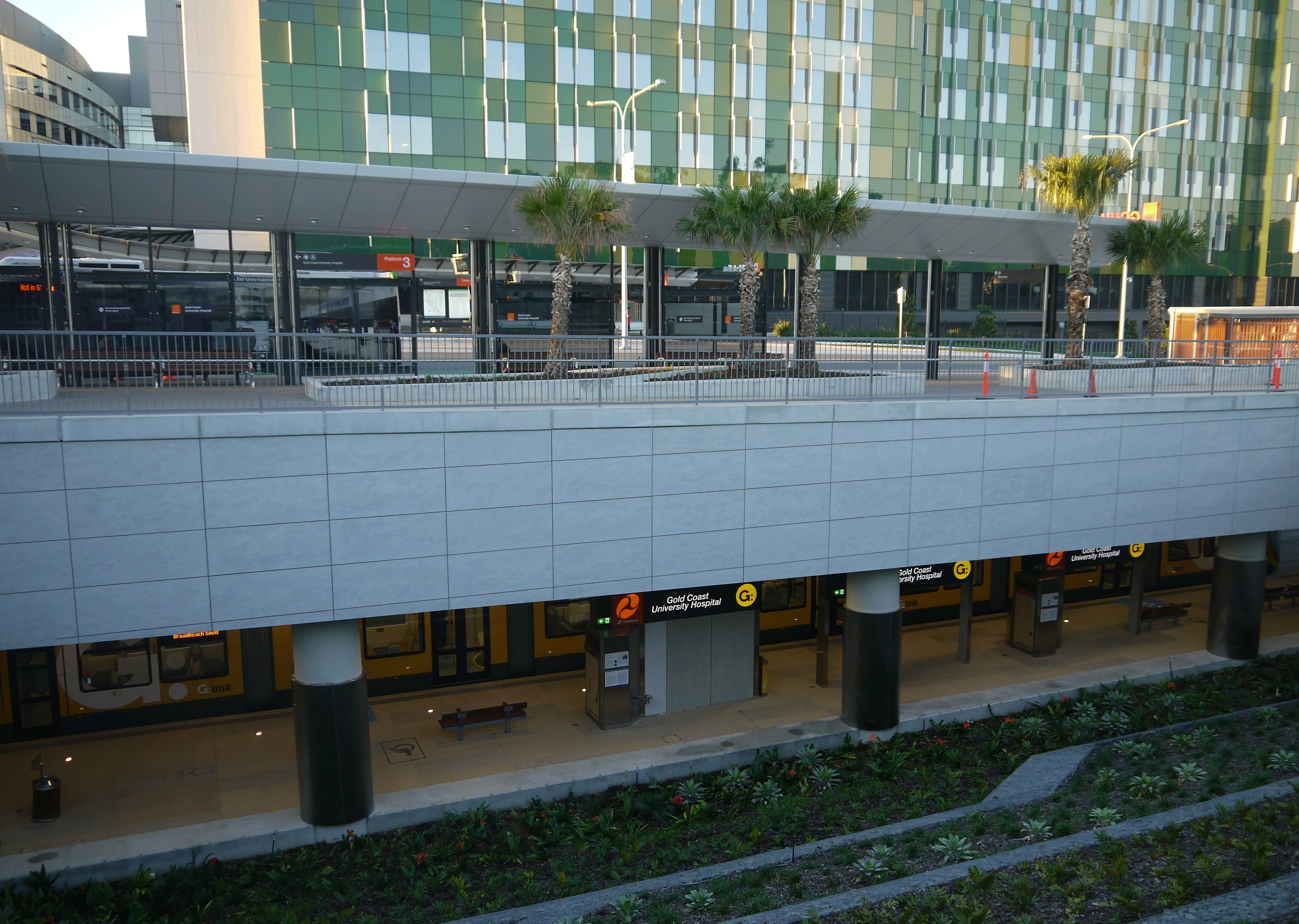
The GCUH bus station and light rail stop

The hospital precinct is served by trams and buses. The G:link light rail system runs from Helensvale railway station to Broadbeach South via the Southport CBD and Surfers Paradise. The Gold Coast University Hospital station is located near the hospital's main entrance, beneath the GCUH bus station.

== Facility services ==
=== Hospital services ===
- Anaesthesia
- Emergency medicine
- Intensive care
- General medicine
- Cardiology
- Nephrology and renal dialysis
- Rehabilitation
- Geriatrics
- Oncology
- Endocrinology
- Gastroenterology and Hepatology
- Paediatrics
- Pharmacy
- General surgery
- Urology
- Ophthalmology
- Orthopedic surgery
- Neurosurgery
- Vascular surgery
- Oral and maxillofacial surgery
- Plastic surgery
- Paediatric surgery
- Gynaecology
- Cardiothoracic surgery
- Palliative care
- Obstetrics
- Psychiatry

=== Hospital buildings ===
- Block A and D — Clinical administration and clinical services buildings: Intensive care, Emergency department (in lower ground), surgical theatres, rehabilitation gymnasium, renal dialysis, and offices
- Blocks B and C – Inpatient units (wards): Connected to main clinical services building; Block B has north and south wings, and Block C has east and west wings
- Block F – Mental health: Inpatient units and clinical offices
- Block E – Pathology and education: Pathology laboratories, lecture theatre, tutorial rooms, and hospital library
- Block M – Engineering Workshops
- Block P – Central Energy Plant

== Training ==
The Gold Coast University Hospital is the primary teaching hospital for medical students (student doctors) of Griffith University's and Bond University's medical schools. And like most Australian public state hospitals, it is an accredited site for further postgraduate residency training of medical practitioners.

It is also one of the hospitals which participates in the Queensland Anaesthetic Rotational Training Scheme for training anaesthetists.

== In media ==
The hospital is featured in the Seven Network factual television series Gold Coast Medical.

== See also ==
- List of hospitals in Australia
