= Illawarra Health & Medical Research Institute =

Health research institute in New South Wales, Australia

Illawarra Health and Medical Research Institute
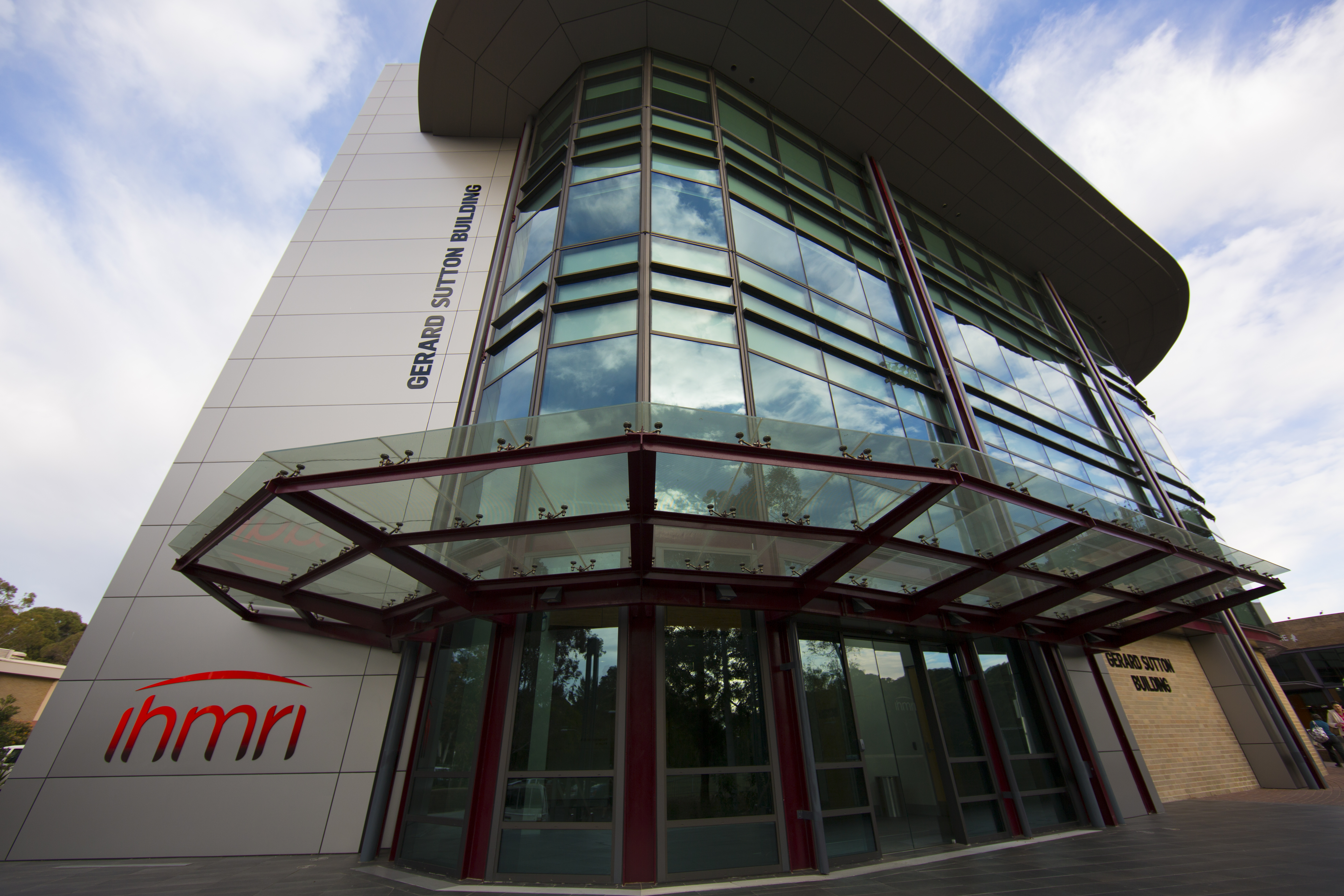
- Research type: Research institute
- Location: Wollongong, New South Wales, Australia
- Affiliations: University of Wollongong and Illawarra Shoalhaven Local Health District
- Website: www.ihmri.org.au

The Illawarra Health and Medical Research Institute (IHMRI) was an independent health and medical research institute based in Wollongong, New South Wales, Australia.

The institute covered a broad range of research themes including research for Huntington's Disease, Motor Neurone Disease, and Vanishing White Matter Disease IHMRI’s purpose was to support and grow health and medical research in the Illawarra region and aimed to connect academic and clinical researchers to enable better understanding and treatment of a range of diseases and conditions.

The IHMRI formally came to a close in June 2022 following a decision of the IHMRI Board, together with founding partners, the University of Wollongong (UOW) and Illawarra Shoalhaven Local Health District (ISLHD)

== History ==
In 2006, the University of Wollongong and the Southeastern Sydney Illawarra Area Health Service (SESIAHS) signed a memorandum of understanding to foster and expand health and medical research in the Illawarra.

IHMRI was formally constituted as a company limited by guarantee in 2008, with the UOW and SESIAHS (now the Illawarra Shoalhaven Local Health District) as its founding members. Professor Don Iverson was appointed as IHMRI’s inaugural executive director and Sue Baker-Finch appointed as chief operating officer.

A contribution of $15 million from the New South Wales Government was matched by $15 million from the UOW to allow construction of a headquarters for IHMRI, with research laboratories and clinical trial research facilities. In July 2010, IHMRI’s headquarters were completed and officially opened by the then NSW Deputy Premier, the Hon Carmel Tebbutt.

In 2014, IHMRI was recognized by the NSW State Government as an independent Medical Research Institute (MRI), allowing access to funding from the NSW Government’s Medical Research Support Program (MRSP).

In 2020, IHMRI became a member of the Association of Australian Medical Research Institutes (AAMRI), an association of medical research institutes across Australia.

== Governance ==
IHMRI was governed by a board of directors consisting of two directors each from UOW and ISLHD, as well as five independent directors.

=== Former Board of Directors ===
- Patrick Reid
- Professor Simon Gandevia
- Maree Kerr
- Dr Paul Moy
- Professor Patricia M. Davidson (UOW)
- Professor Jennifer L Martin AC (UOW)
- Professor Denis King OAM (ISLHD)
- Margot Mains (ISLHD)

=== Patron ===
- Dame Bridget Ogilvie (AC, DBE, ScD, FRS, FAA)

=== Former Board Chairpersons and Executive Staff ===
Chair

- George Edgar (March 2009 – March 2012)
- Alan Pettigrew (March 2014 – February 2020)
- Tim Berry (Acting) (February – July 2020)
- Stephen Andersen OAM (July 2020 – December 2021)

Executive Director

- Don Iverson (April 2008 – December 2012)
- Xu-Feng Huang (Acting) (January–June 2013)
- Mike Calford (July 2013 – March 2014)
- Brett Garner (Acting) (March – December 2014)
- Alan Pettigrew (Acting) (January–November 2015)
- David Adams (December 2015 – 2022)

Chief Operating Officer

- Sue Baker-Finch (October 2008 – February 2016)
- Kara Lamond (August 2016 – 2022)
