= Armadale Health Service =

Hospital in Perth, Western Australia

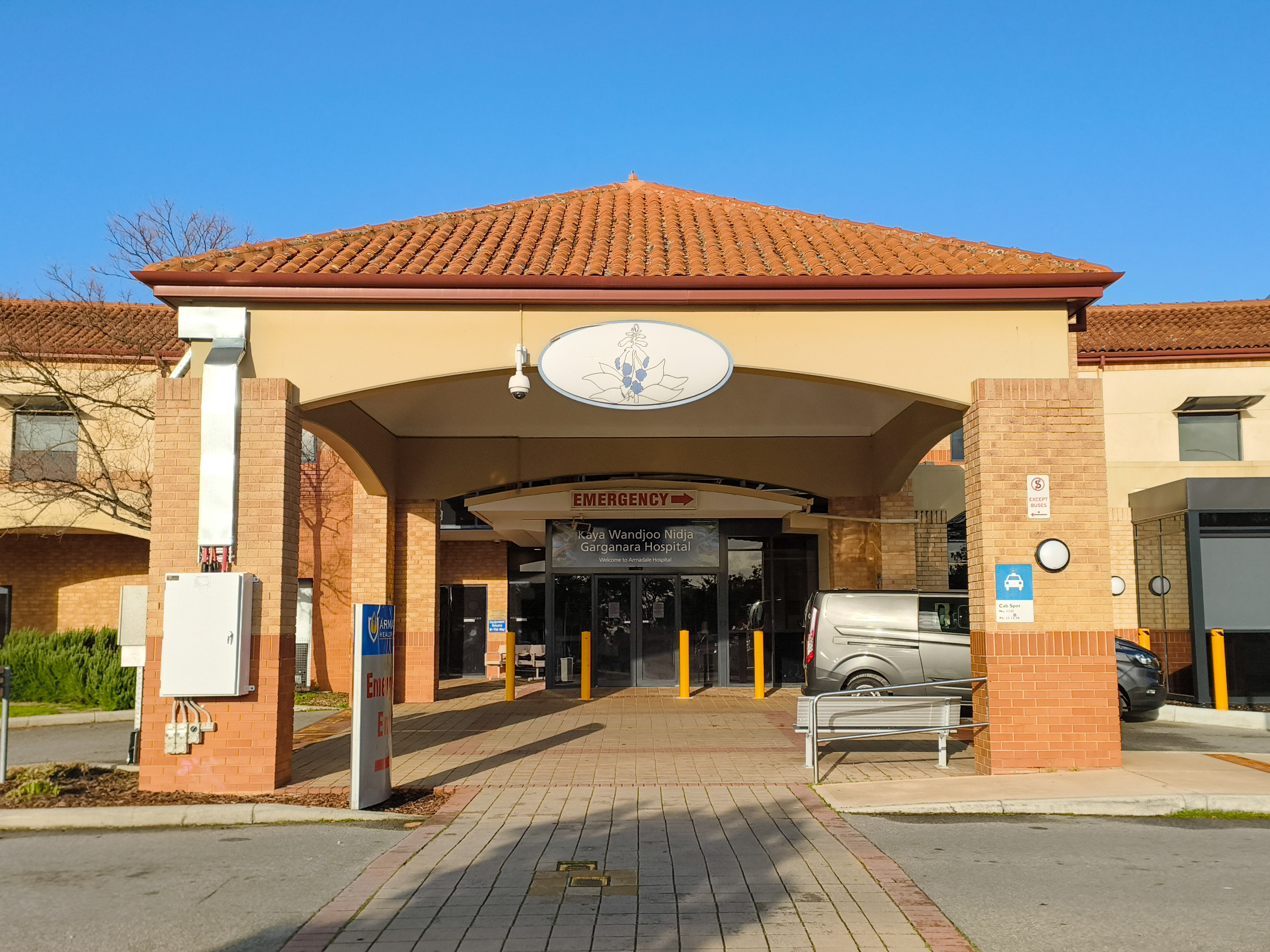
- Main entrance of Armadale Hospital

Geography
- Location: 3056 Albany Highway, Mount Nasura, Western Australia, Australia
- Coordinates: 32°07′59″S 116°01′11″E

Organisation
- Type: General

Services
- Emergency department: Yes
- Beds: 271

Links
- Website: www.ahs.health.wa.gov.au
- Lists: Hospitals in Australia

Armadale Health Service is a 271-bed public healthcare facility in Mount Nasura, in Perth's south-eastern suburbs. The campus includes Armadale Hospital, a general hospital with an emergency department with 47 acute-care spaces. The campus also includes Armadale's Community Health Service, Mental Health Service, and Aged Care and Rehabilitation Service.

The hospital is the only one in Western Australia to reserve spots for dialysis patients.

== History ==
Before a hospital was established in Armadale, anyone in the area requiring medical attention beyond what the local doctor could provide had to travel into Perth. In 1924, the government made available an annual subsidy of £A 50, equivalent to A$4,600 in 2022, to encourage the establishment of a private hospital.

In 1946, the Armadale Kelmscott Road Board planned to purchase the private hospital, and open a public hospital at the site. An incorporated society would be formed to own and run the premises. In March 1946, the hospital building was taken over as a district war memorial hospital. It was initially operated under a lease while funds were being raised to buy the building.

The hospital was extended with a new block, including an operating theatre, that was opened by The Minister for Housing, Mr. Wild, on 8 February 1953. It was subsidized by a government grant of £A 4000, equivalent to A$159,000 in 2022.

A major redevelopment occurred between 1999 and 2001. In February 2005, the hospital took over the adjacent private facilities, previously known as the Galliers Private Hospital and the Galliers Specialist Centre. In 2007, the emergency department was expanded to twice its previous size.

In May 2024, Minister Mark Butler announced that an urgent care clinic will be built to reduce pressure on the Armadale Health Service.
