= List of hospitals in Australia =

A list of all of the hospitals from Australia

A hospital is a healthcare institution providing patient treatment with specialized medical science and auxiliary healthcare staff and medical equipment. In Australia, there are many hospitals in rural or busy localities across the country. This is a List of hospitals in Australia.

== New South Wales ==
=== Public ===
- Albury Wodonga Health (Albury Campus) – Albury
- Armidale Hospital – Armidale.
- Auburn Hospital – Auburn
- Ballina Hospital – Ballina
- Balmain Hospital – Balmain
- Balranald Multi Purpose Service – Balranald
- Bankstown Lidcombe Hospital – Bankstown
- Baradine Multi Purpose Service – Baradine
- Barham Hospital – Barham
- Barraba Multi Purpose Service – Barraba
- Batemans Bay Hospital – Batemans Bay
- Bathurst Hospital – Bathurst
- Batlow/Adelong Multi Purpose Service – Batlow
- Bellinger River District Hospital – Bellingen
- Belmont Hospital – Belmont
- Berrigan Multi Purpose Service – Berrigan
- Bingara Multi Purpose Service – Bingara
- Blacktown Hospital – Blacktown
- Blayney Multi Purpose Service – Blayney
- Blue Mountains District ANZAC Memorial Hospital – Katoomba
- Boggabri Multi Purpose Service – Boggabri
- Bombala Multi Purpose Service – Bombala
- Bonalbo Hospital – Bonalbo
- Boorowa Multi Purpose Service – Boorowa
- Bourke Multi Purpose Service – Bourke
- Bourke Street Health Service – Goulburn
- Bowral and District Hospital – Bowral
- Braeside Hospital – Prairiewood
- Braidwood Multi Purpose Service – Braidwood
- Brewarrina Multi Purpose Service – Brewarrina
- Broken Hill Hospital – Broken Hill
- Bulahdelah Hospital – Bulahdelah
- Bulli Hospital – Bulli
- Byron Bay Hospital – Byron Bay
- Calvary Health Care Kogarah – Kogarah
- Calvary Mater Newcastle Hospital – Waratah
- Camden Hospital – Camden
- Campbelltown Hospital – Campbelltown
- Canowindra Hospital – Canowindra
- Canterbury Hospital – Campsie
- Casino Hospital – Casino
- Cessnock Hospital – Cessnock
- Children's Hospital at Westmead – Westmead – Westmead
- Cobar Hospital – Cobar
- Coffs Harbour Hospital – Coffs Harbour
- Coledale Hospital – Coledale
- Collarenebri Multi Purpose Service – Collarenebri
- Concord Repatriation General Hospital – Concord
- Condobolin Hospital – Condobolin
- Coolah Multi Purpose Service – Coolah
- Coolamon Multi Purpose Service – Coolamon
- Cooma Hospital – Cooma
- Coonabarabran Hospital – Coonabarabran
- Coonamble Multi Purpose Service – Coonamble
- Cootamundra Hospital – Cootamundra
- Coraki Hospital – Coraki
- Coral Tree Family Service – North Ryde
- Corowa Hospital – Corowa
- Cowra Hospital – Cowra
- Crookwell Hospital – Crookwell
- Cudal Health Service – Cudal
- Culcairn Multi Purpose Service – Culcairn
- Cumberland Hospital – Westmead
- David Berry Hospital – Berry
- Delegate Multi Purpose Service – Delegate
- Deniliquin Hospital – Deniliquin
- Denman Multi Purpose Service – Denman
- Dorrigo Multi Purpose Service – Dorrigo
- Dubbo Hospital – Dubbo
- Dunedoo Multi Purpose Service – Dunedoo
- Dungog Hospital – Dungog
- Eugowra Hospital – Eugowra
- Fairfield Hospital – Prairiewood
- Finley Hospital – Finley
- Forbes Hospital – Forbes
- Forster-Tuncurry District Hospital – Forster (opening soon)
- Gilgandra Multi Purpose Service – Gilgandra
- Glen Innes Hospital – Glen Innes
- Gloucester Hospital – Gloucester
- Goodooga Health Service – Goodooga
- Gosford Hospital – Gosford
- Goulburn Base Hospital – Goulburn
- Gower Wilson Multi Purpose Service – Lord Howe Island
- Grafton Base Hospital – Grafton
- Greenwich Hospital – Greenwich
- Grenfell Multi Purpose Service – Grenfell
- Griffith Base Hospital – Griffith
- Gulargambone Multi Purpose Service – Gulargambone
- Gulgong Health Service – Gulgong
- Gundagai Hospital – Gundagai
- Gunnedah Hospital – Gunnedah
- Guyra Multi Purpose Service – Guyra
- Hawkesbury Hospital – Windsor
- Hay Hospital – Hay
- Henty Multi Purpose Service – Henty
- Hillston Hospital – Hillston
- Holbrook Hospital – Holbrook
- Hornsby Ku-ring-gai Hospital – Hornsby
- Hunter New England Mater Mental Health Service – Newcastle
- Illawarra Mental Health Services
- Inverell Hospital – Inverell
- Ivanhoe Hospital – Ivanhoe
- Jerilderie Multi Purpose Service – Jerilderie
- John Hunter Hospital – New Lambton
- Junee Multi Purpose Service – Junee
- Justice Health Services – Malabar
- Karitane Mothercraft Society – Carramar
- Kempsey Hospital – Kempsey
- Kenmore Hospital – Kenmore
- Kiama Hospital – Kiama
- Kurri Kurri Hospital – Kurri Kurri
- Kyogle Multi Purpose Service – Kyogle
- Lake Cargelligo Multi Purpose Service – Lake Cargelligo
- Leeton Hospital – Leeton
- Lightning Ridge Multi Purpose Service – Lightning Ridge
- Lismore Base Hospital – Lismore
- Lithgow Hospital – Lithgow
- Liverpool Hospital – Liverpool
- Lockhart Hospital – Lockhart
- Long Jetty Health Care Centre – Killarney Vale
- Lourdes Hospital Dubbo – Dubbo
- Macksville Hospital – Macksville
- Maclean Hospital – Maclean
- Macquarie Hospital – North Ryde
- Maitland Hospital – Maitland
- Manilla Hospital – Manilla
- Manly Hospital – Manly
- Manning Hospital – Taree
- Menindee Health Service – Menindee
- Mercy Care Hospital – Albury – Albury
- Mercy Care Hospital – Young – Young
- Merriwa Multi Purpose Service – Merriwa
- Milton Ulladulla Hospital – Milton
- Molong Hospital – Molong
- Mona Vale Hospital – Mona Vale
- Moree Hospital – Moree
- Morisset Hospital – Morisset
- Moruya Hospital – Moruya
- Mount Druitt Hospital – Mount Druitt
- Mudgee Hospital – Mudgee
- Mullumbimby Hospital – Mullumbimby
- Murrumburrah-Harden Hospital – Harden
- Murwillumbah Hospital – Murwillumbah
- Muswellbrook Hospital – Muswellbrook
- Narrabri Hospital – Narrabri
- Narrandera Hospital – Narrandera
- Narromine Hospital – Narromine
- Nepean Hospital – Kingswood
- Neringah Hospital – Wahroonga
- Nimbin Multi Purpose Service – Nimbin
- Northern Beaches Hospital – Frenchs Forest
- Nyngan Multi Purpose Service – Nyngan
- Oberon Multi Purpose Service – Oberon
- Orange Health Service – Orange
- Pambula Hospital – Pambula
- Parkes Hospital – Parkes
- Peak Hill Hospital – Peak Hill
- Port Kembla Hospital – Warrawong
- Port Macquarie Hospital – Port Macquarie
- Portland Hospital – Portland
- Prince of Wales Hospital – Randwick
- Queanbeyan District Hospital – Queanbeyan
- Quirindi Hospital – Quirindi
- Rivendell Child, Adolescent and Family Unit – Concord West
- Riverlands Drug and Alcohol Centre – Lismore
- Royal Hospital for Women – Randwick
- Royal North Shore Hospital – St Leonards
- Royal Prince Alfred Hospital – Camperdown
- Royal Prince Alfred Institute of Rheumatology & Orthopaedics – Camperdown
- Royal Rehabilitation Hospital – Ryde
- Ryde Hospital – Eastwood
- Rylstone Multi Purpose Service – Rylstone
- Sacred Heart Hospice – Darlinghurst
- Scone Hospital – Scone
- Shellharbour Hospital – Mount Warrigal
- Shoalhaven District Memorial Hospital – Nowra
- Singleton District Hospital – Singleton
- South East Regional Hospital – Bega
- Springwood Hospital – Springwood
- St George Hospital NSW – Kogarah
- St John of God Hospital Richmond – Richmond
- St Joseph's Hospital – Auburn
- St Vincent's Hospital – Darlinghurst
- Sutherland Hospital – Caringbah
- Sydney Children's Hospital – Randwick
- Sydney Dental Hospital – Surry Hills
- Sydney Hospital (oldest hospital in Australia, dating from 1788) / Sydney Eye Hospital – Sydney
- Tamworth Hospital – Tamworth
- Temora Hospital – Temora
- Tenterfield Hospital – Tenterfield
- Thomas Walker Hospital – Concord West
- Tibooburra Hospital – Tibooburra
- Tingha Multi Purpose Service – Tingha
- Tocumwal Hospital – Tocumwal
- Tomaree Hospital – Nelson Bay
- Tottenham Multi Purpose Service – Tottenham
- Trangie Multi Purpose Service – Trangie
- Tresillian Family Care Centre, Canterbury – Belmore
- Tresillian Family Care Centre, Kingswood – Kingswood
- Trundle Multi Purpose Health Service – Trundle
- The Tweed Hospital – Tweed Heads
- Tullamore Multi Purpose Health Service – Tullamore
- Tumbarumba Multi Purpose Service – Tumbarumba
- Tumut Hospital – Tumut
- Urana Multi Purpose Service – Urana
- Urbenville Multi Purpose Service – Urbenville
- Vegetable Creek Multi Purpose Service Emmaville – Emmaville
- Wagga Wagga Rural Referral Hospital – Wagga Wagga
- Walcha Multi Purpose Service – Walcha
- Walgett Hospital – Walgett
- War Memorial Hospital – Waverley
- Warialda Multi Purpose Service – Warialda
- Warren Multi Purpose Service – Warren
- Wauchope Hospital – Wauchope
- Wee Waa Hospital – Wee Waa
- Wellington Hospital – Wellington
- Wentworth Hospital – Wentworth
- Wentworth Psychiatric Services – Penrith
- Werris Creek Hospital – Werris Creek
- Westmead Hospital – Westmead
- Wilcannia Multi Purpose Service – Wilcannia
- Wilson Memorial Community Hospital, Murrurundi – Murrurundi
- Wingham Hospital – Wingham
- Wollongong Hospital – Wollongong
- Woy Woy Hospital – Woy Woy
- Wyalong Hospital – West Wyalong
- Wyong Hospital – Hamlyn Terrace
- Yaralla Estate, also known as the Dame Edith Walker Estate – Concord West
- Yass Hospital – Yass
- Young Hospital – Young

=== Private ===
- Aesthetic Day Surgery – Kogarah
- Albury Wodonga Private Hospital – West Albury
- Allowah Presbyterian Children's Hospital – Dundas
- Armidale Private Hospital – Armidale
- Ballina Day Surgery – Ballina
- Baringa Private Hospital – Coffs Harbour
- Bathurst Private Hospital – Bathurst
- Bega Valley Private Hospital – Bega
- Berkeley Vale Private Hospital – Berkeley Vale
- Brisbane Waters Private Hospital – Woy Woy
- Calvary Riverina Hospital – Wagga Wagga
- Calvary Riverina Surgicentre – Wagga Wagga
- Calvary Riverina Drug and Alcohol Centre – Wagga Wagga
- Camden Haven Medical Center (Laurieton Hospital)
- Campbelltown Private Hospital – Campbelltown
- Castle Hill Day Surgery – Castle Hill
- Castlecrag Private Hospital – Castlecrag
- Central Coast Day Hospital – Erina
- Centre for Digestive Diseases – Five Dock
- Coffs Harbour Day Surgery – Coffs Harbour
- Coolenberg Day Surgery – Port Macquarie
- Crows Nest Day Surgery – Crows Nest
- Dee Why Endoscopy Unit – Dee Why
- Diagnostic Endoscopy Centre – Darlinghurst
- Dudley-Orange Private Hospital – Orange
- Eastern Heart Clinic – Randwick
- Epping Surgery Centre – Epping
- Figtree Private Hospital – Figtree
- Forster Private Hospital – Forster
- Gordon Private Hospital
- Hastings Day Surgery – Port Macquarie
- The Hills Clinic Kellyville – Kellyville
- The Hills Private Hospital – Baulkham Hills
- Hunter Valley Private Hospital – Shortland
- Hunters Hill Private Hospital – Hunters Hill
- Hurstville Private – Hurstville
- Kareena Private Hospital – Caringbah
- Lady Davidson Private Hospital – North Turramurra
- Lake Macquarie Private Hospital – Gateshead
- Lawrence Hargrave Private Hospital – Thirroul
- Liverpool Day Surgery – Chipping Norton
- Macquarie University Hospital – Macquarie University
- Mater Hospital Sydney – North Sydney
- MetroRehab Hospital – Petersham
- Metwest Surgical – Blacktown
- Miranda Eye Surgical Centre – Miranda
- Mogo Day Surgery – Mogo
- Mosman Private Hospital – Mosman
- Mount Wilga Private Hospital (see Mount Wilga House) – Hornsby
- Nepean Private Hospital – Kingswood
- Newcastle Private Hospital – New Lambton Heights
- North Shore Private Hospital – St Leonards
- Northside Clinic – Greenwich
- Northside Cremorne Clinic – Cremorne
- Northside Macarthur Clinic – Campbelltown
- Northside West Clinic – Wentworthville
- Norwest Private Hospital – Bella Vista
- Nowra Private Hospital – Nowra
- Ophthalmic Surgery Centre (North Shore) – Chatswood
- Orange Day Surgery Centre – Orange
- Pennant Hills Day Endoscopy Centre – Pennant Hills
- Perfect Vision Day Surgery – Hornsby
- Potentialz Unlimited, Clinical Psychologies in Sydney
- Port Macquarie Private Hospital – Port Macquarie
- Prince of Wales Private Hospital – Randwick
- Radiation Oncology Institute – Gosford – Gosford
- Radiation Oncology Institute – The Sydney Adventist Hospital Wahroonga – Wahroonga
- San Day Surgery Hornsby – Hornsby
- The Skin & Cancer Foundation Australia – Westmead
- South Pacific Private – Curl Curl
- Southern Highlands Private Hospital – Bowral
- St George Private Hospital – Kogarah
- St John of God Burwood Hospital – Burwood
- St John of God Hospital Richmond – North Richmond
- St Luke's Hospital – Potts Point
- St Vincent's Private Sydney – Darlinghurst
- St Vincents Private Hospital [Lismore] – Lismore
- Strathfield Private Hospital – Strathfield
- The Surgery Centre Hurstville – Hurstville
- Sutherland Heart Clinic – Caringbah
- Sydney Adventist Hospital – Wahroonga
- The Sydney Clinic – Bronte
- Sydney Day Surgery – Prince Alfred – Newtown
- The Sydney Private Hospital Incorporating the NSW Eye Centre – Ashfield
- Sydney South West Private Hospital – Liverpool
- Tamara Private Hospital – Tamworth
- Tweed Day Surgery – Tweed Heads
- Ulladulla Endoscopy and Medical Centre – Ulladulla
- Wagga Endoscopy Centre – Wagga Wagga
- Warners Bay Private Hospital – Warners Bay
- Wesley Hospital Ashfield – Ashfield
- Wesley Hospital Kogarah – Kogarah
- Western Sydney Oncology – Westmead
- Westmead Private Hospital – Westmead
- Westmead Rehabilitation Hospital – Merrylands
- Wollongong Day Surgery – Wollongong
- Wolper Jewish Hospital – Woollahra

== Northern Territory ==
=== Public ===
- Alice Springs Hospital – Alice Springs
- Gove District Hospital – Nhulunbuy
- Katherine District Hospital – Katherine
- Palmerston Regional Hospital – Holtze
- Royal Darwin Hospital – Tiwi
- Tennant Creek Hospital – Tennant Creek

=== Private ===
- Darwin Private Hospital – Tiwi

== Queensland ==
=== Public ===
- Alpha Hospital – Alpha
- Aramac Primary Healthcare Centre – Aramac
- Atherton Hospital – Atherton
- Augathella Hospital – Augathella
- Aurukun Primary Health Care Centre – Aurukun
- Ayr Hospital – Ayr
- Babinda Hospital – Babinda
- Badu Island Health Centre – Badu Island
- Baillie Henderson Hospital – Toowoomba
- Bamaga Hospital – Bamaga
- Baralaba Hospital – Baralaba
- Barcaldine Hospital – Barcaldine
- Beaudesert Hospital – Beaudesert
- Biggenden Hospital – Biggenden
- Biloela Hospital – Biloela
- Blackall Hospital – Blackall
- Blackwater Hospital – Blackwater
- Boigu Island Health Centre – Boigu Island
- Bollon Outpatients Clinic – Bollon
- Boonah Hospital – Boonah
- Boulia Primary Health Centre – Boulia
- Bowen Hospital – Bowen
- Bundaberg Base Hospital – Bundaberg
- Burketown Health Centre – Burketown
- Caboolture Hospital – Caboolture
- Cairns Hospital – Cairns
- Caloundra Hospital – Caloundra
- Camooweal Health Centre – Camooweal
- Capella Outpatients Clinic – Capella
- Capricorn Coast Hospital – Yeppoon
- Charleville Hospital – Charleville
- Charters Towers Hospital – Charters Towers
- Charters Towers Rehabilitation Unit – Charters Towers
- Cherbourg Hospital – Cherbourg
- Childers Hospital – Childers
- Chillagoe Hospital – Chillagoe
- Chinchilla Hospital – Chinchilla
- Clermont Hospital – Clermont
- Cloncurry Hospital – Cloncurry
- Coconut Island Health Centre – Coconut Island
- Coen Primary Health Care Centre – Coen
- Collinsville Hospital – Collinsville
- Cooktown Hospital – Cooktown
- Cracow Outpatients Clinic – Cracow
- Croydon Hospital – Croydon
- Cunnamulla Hospital – Cunnamulla
- Dajarra Health Centre – Dajarra
- Dalby Hospital – Dalby
- Darnley Island Primary Health Care Centre – Darnley Island
- Dauan Island Health Centre – Dauan Island
- Dimbulah Outpatients Clinic – Dimbulah
- Dirranbandi Hospital – Dirranbandi
- Doomadgee Hospital – Doomadgee
- Duaringa Outpatients Clinic – Duaringa
- Dysart Hospital – Dysart
- Eidsvold Hospital – Eidsvold
- Ellen Barron Family Centre – Chermside
- Emerald Hospital – Emerald
- Esk Hospital – Esk
- Forsayth Hospital – Forsayth
- Gatton Hospital – Gatton
- Gayndah Hospital – Gayndah
- Gemfields Outpatients Clinic – Sapphire
- Georgetown Hospital – Georgetown
- Gin Gin Hospital – Gin Gin
- Gladstone Hospital – Gladstone
- Glenmorgan Outpatients Clinic – Glenmorgan
- Gold Coast University Hospital – Southport
- Goondiwindi Hospital – Goondiwindi
- Gordonvale Hospital – Gordonvale
- Gurriny Yealamucka Primary Health Care Service – Yarrabah
- Gympie Hospital – Gympie
- Herberton Hospital – Herberton
- Hervey Bay Hospital – Pialba
- Home Hill Hospital – Home Hill
- Hope Vale Primary Health Care Centre – Hope Vale
- Hughenden Hospital – Hughenden
- Ingham Hospital – Ingham
- Inglewood Hospital – Inglewood
- Injune Hospital – Injune
- Innisfail Hospital – Innisfail
- Ipswich Hospital – Ipswich
- Isisford Primary Health Centre – Isisford
- Island Medical Service – Thursday Island
- Jandowae Hospital – Jandowae
- Joyce Palmer Health Service – Palm Island
- Julia Creek Hospital – Julia Creek
- Jundah Primary Health Centre – Jundah
- Karumba Health Centre – Karumba
- Kilcoy Hospital – Kilcoy
- Kingaroy Hospital – Kingaroy
- Kirwan Mental Health Rehabilitation Unit – Kirwan
- Kowanyama Primary Health Care Centre – Kowanyama
- Kubin Primary Health Care Centre – Kubin
- Laidley Hospital – Laidley
- Laura Outpatients Clinic – Laura
- Lockhart River Primary Health Care Centre – Lockhart River
- Logan Hospital – Meadowbrook
- Longreach Hospital – Longreach
- Mabuiag Island Health Centre – Mabuiag Island
- Mackay Base Hospital – Mackay
- Magnetic Island Health Service Centre – Nelly Bay
- Malakoola Primary Health Care Centre – Napranum
- Malanda Outpatients Clinic – Malanda
- Maleny Soldier's Memorial Hospital – Maleny
- Mapoon Primary Health Care Centre – Mapoon
- Mareeba Hospital – Mareeba
- Marie Rose Centre – Dunwich
- Maryborough Hospital – Maryborough
- Mater Adult Hospital – South Brisbane
- Mater Children's Hospital – South Brisbane (closed 2014)
- Mater Mothers' Hospital – South Brisbane
- Meandarra Outpatients Clinic – Meandarra
- Miles Hospital – Miles
- Millaa Millaa Outpatients Clinic – Millaa Millaa
- Millmerran Hospital – Millmerran
- Mitchell Hospital – Mitchell
- Monto Hospital – Monto
- Moonie Outpatients Clinic – Moonie
- Moranbah Hospital – Moranbah
- Mornington Island Hospital – Mornington Island
- Morven Outpatients Clinic – Morven
- Mossman Hospital – Mossman
- Mount Garnet Outpatients Clinic – Mount Garnet
- Mount Isa Hospital – Mornington, Mount Isa
- Mount Morgan Hospital – Mount Morgan
- Mount Perry Health Centre – Mount Perry
- Moura Hospital – Moura
- Mundubbera Hospital – Mundubbera
- Mungindi Hospital – Mungindi
- Murgon Hospital – Murgon
- Murray Island Primary Health Centre – Murray Island
- Muttaburra Primary Health Centre – Muttaburra
- Nambour Hospital – Nambour
- Nanango Hospital – Nanango
- Normanton Hospital – Normanton
- Oakey Hospital – Oakey
- The Park Centre for Mental Health – Wacol
- Pormpuraaw Primary Health Care Centre – Pormpuraaw
- The Prince Charles Hospital – Chermside
- Princess Alexandra Hospital – Woolloongabba
- Proserpine Hospital – Proserpine
- Queen Elizabeth II Jubilee Hospital – Coopers Plains
- Queensland Children's Hospital – South Brisbane
- Quilpie Hospital – Quilpie
- Ravenshoe Outpatients Clinic – Ravenshoe
- Redcliffe Hospital – Redcliffe
- Redland Hospital – Cleveland
- Redland Satellite Hospital (set to open 2023) – Redland Bay
- Richmond Hospital – Richmond
- Robina Hospital – Robina
- Rockhampton Hospital – Rockhampton
- Roma Hospital – Roma
- Royal Brisbane & Women's Hospital – Herston
- Royal Children's Hospital – Herston (closed 2014)
- Saibai Island Primary Health Centre – Saibai Island
- Sarina Hospital – Sarina
- Springsure Hospital – Springsure
- St George Hospital Qld – St George
- St Pauls Primary Health Care Centre – St Pauls
- Stanthorpe Hospital – Stanthorpe
- Stephens Island Primary Health Care Centre – Stephens Island
- Sunshine Coast University Hospital
- Surat Hospital – Surat
- Tambo Primary Health Centre – Tambo
- Tara Hospital – Tara
- Taroom Hospital – Taroom
- Texas Hospital – Texas
- Thargomindah Hospital – Thargomindah
- Theodore Hospital – Theodore
- Thursday Island Hospital – Thursday Island
- Thursday Island Primary Health Care Centre – Thursday Island
- Toowoomba Hospital – Toowoomba
- Townsville Hospital – Douglas
- Tully Hospital – Tully
- Wallumbilla Outpatients Clinic – Wallumbilla
- Wandoan Hospital – Wandoan
- Warraber Island Primary Health Centre – Warraber Island
- Warwick Hospital – Warwick
- Weipa Hospital – Weipa
- Windorah Clinic – Windorah
- Winton Hospital – Winton
- Wondai Hospital – Wondai
- Woorabinda Hospital – Woorabinda
- Wujal Wujal Primary Health Care Centre – Wujal Wujal
- Wynnum Hospital – Lota
- Yam Island Primary Health Centre – Yam Island
- Yaraka Clinic – Yaraka
- Yorke Island Primary Health Centre – Yorke Island

=== Private ===
- Allamanda Private Hospital – Southport
- Brisbane Endoscopy Services P/L – Sunnybank
- Brisbane Private Hospital – Brisbane
- Caboolture Private Hospital – Caboolture
- The Cairns Clinic – Cairns
- Cairns Day Surgery – Cairns
- Cairns Private Hospital – Cairns
- Caloundra Private Hospital – Caloundra
- Chermside Day Hospital – Chermside
- Eye-Tech Day Surgeries – Spring Hill
- Eye-Tech Day Surgeries Southside – Upper Mt Gravatt
- Friendly Society Private Hospital – Bundaberg
- Gold Coast Private Hospital
- Greenslopes Day Surgery – Greenslopes
- Greenslopes Private Hospital – Greenslopes
- Gympie Private Hospital – Gympie
- Hervey Bay Surgical Hospital – Pialba
- Hillcrest Rockhampton Private Hospital – Rockhampton
- Hopewell Hospice – Arundel
- Ipswich Day Hospital – Ipswich
- John Flynn Private Hospital – Tugun
- Kawana Private Hospital – Birtinya
- Mackay Specialist Day Hospital – North Mackay
- Mater Children's Private Hospital – South Brisbane
- Mater Hospital Pimlico – Pimlico
- Mater Misericordiae Day Unit – Mackay
- Mater Misericordiae Hospital Bundaberg – Bundaberg
- Mater Misericordiae Hospital Gladstone – Gladstone
- Mater Misericordiae Hospital Mackay – Mackay
- Mater Misericordiae Hospital, Rockhampton – Rockhampton
- Mater Misericordiae Hospital Yeppoon – Yeppoon
- Mater Mother's Private Hospital – South Brisbane
- Mater Private Hospital Redland – Cleveland
- Mater Private Hospital Springfield – Springfield
- Mater Private Hospital South Brisbane – South Brisbane
- Mater Women's and Children's Hospital Hyde Park – Hyde Park
- Montserrat Day Hospital Gaythorne – Gaythorne
- Montserrat Day Hospital Indooroopilly – Indooroopilly
- Montserrat Day Hospital North Lakes – North Lakes
- Nambour Day Surgery – Nambour
- Nambour Selangor Private Hospital – Nambour
- New Farm Clinic – New Farm
- Noosa Hospital – Noosaville
- North Mackay Private Hospital – North Mackay
- North West Private Hospital – Everton Park
- Pacific Private Day Hospital – Southport
- Peninsula Private Hospital Queensland – Kippa-Ring
- Pindara Day Procedure Centre – Benowa
- Pindara Private Hospital – Benowa
- Pine Rivers Private Hospital – Strathpine
- Queensland Eye Hospital – Spring Hill
- River City Private Hospital – Auchenflower
- Robina Procedure Centre – Robina
- Short Street Day Surgery – Southport
- South Burnett Private Hospital – Kingaroy
- Southport Day Hospital – Southport
- Southside Endoscopy Centre – Loganholme
- Spendelove Private Hospital – Southport
- St Andrew's Ipswich Private Hospital – Ipswich
- St Andrew's Toowoomba Hospital – Toowoomba
- St Andrew's War Memorial Hospital – Spring Hill
- St Stephen's Hospital Hervey Bay – Hervey Bay
- St Stephen's Hospital Maryborough – Maryborough
- St Vincents Private Hospital Northside – Chermside
- St Vincent's Private Hospital Brisbane – Kangaroo Point
- St Vincent's Private Hospital Toowoomba – Toowoomba
- Sunnybank Private Hospital – Sunnybank
- Sunshine Coast Haematology and Oncology Clinic – Cotton Tree
- The Sunshine Coast Private Hospital – Buderim
- Sunshine Coast University Private Hospital – Birtinya
- Toowong Private Hospital – Toowong
- Toowoomba Surgicentre – Toowoomba
- Townsville Day Surgery – West End
- Wesley Hospital – Auchenflower

== South Australia ==
=== Public ===
- Andamooka Outpost Hospital – Andamooka
- Angaston District Hospital – Angaston
- Balaklava Soldiers Memorial District Hospital – Balaklava
- Barmera Health Service – Barmera
- Booleroo Centre District Hospital and Health Services – Booleroo Centre
- Bordertown Memorial Hospital – Bordertown
- Burra Hospital – Burra
- Ceduna District Health Service – Ceduna
- Central Yorke Peninsula Hospital (Maitland) – Maitland
- Clare Hospital – Clare
- Cleve District Hospital and Aged Care – Cleve
- Coober Pedy Hospital and Health Service – Coober Pedy
- Cowell District Hospital and Aged Care – Cowell
- Crystal Brook and District Hospital – Crystal Brook
- Cummins and District Memorial Hospital – Cummins
- Elliston Hospital – Elliston
- Eudunda Hospital – Eudunda
- Flinders Medical Centre – Bedford Park
- Gawler Health Service – Gawler East
- Glenside Campus Mental Health Service – Glenside
- Gumeracha District Soldiers Memorial Hospital – Gumeracha
- Hampstead Rehabilitation Centre – Northfield
- Hawker Memorial Hospital – Hawker
- Jamestown Hospital and Health Service – Jamestown
- Kangaroo Island Health Service – Kingscote
- Kapunda Hospital – Kapunda
- Karoonda and District Soldiers' Memorial Hospital – Karoonda
- Kimba District Hospital and Aged Care – Kimba
- Kingston Soldiers' Memorial Hospital – Kingston SE
- Lameroo District Health Service – Lameroo
- Laura and District Hospital – Laura
- Leigh Creek Health Service – Leigh Creek
- Loxton Hospital Complex – Loxton
- Lyell McEwin Hospital – Elizabeth Vale
- Mannum District Hospital – Mannum
- Marree Health Services – Marree
- Meningie & Districts Memorial Hospital & Health Services – Meningie
- Millicent & Districts Hospital & Health Service – Millicent
- Modbury Hospital – Modbury
- Mount Barker District Soldiers' Memorial Hospital – Mount Barker
- Mount Gambier and Districts Health Service – Mount Gambier
- Mount Pleasant District Hospital – Mount Pleasant
- Murray Bridge Soldiers' Memorial Hospital – Murray Bridge
- Naracoorte Health Service – Naracoorte
- Noarlunga Public Hospital – Noarlunga Centre
- Northern Yorke Peninsula Health Service (Wallaroo) – Wallaroo
- Oakden Hospital – Oakden
- Oodnadatta Clinic – Oodnadatta
- Orroroo & District Health Service – Orroroo
- Penola War Memorial Hospital – Penola
- Peterborough Soldiers' Memorial Hospital – Peterborough
- Pinnaroo Soldiers' Memorial Hospital – Pinnaroo
- Port Augusta Hospital & Regional Health Services – Port Augusta
- Port Broughton & District Hospital & Health Service – Port Broughton
- Port Lincoln Health Service – Port Lincoln
- Port Pirie Regional Health Service – Port Pirie
- Pregnancy Advisory Centre – Woodville Park
- Quorn Health Service – Quorn
- Renmark Paringa District Hospital – Renmark
- Riverland General Hospital – Berri
- Riverton District Soldiers Memorial Hospital – Riverton
- Roxby Downs Health Service – Roxby Downs
- Royal Adelaide Hospital – Adelaide
- Snowtown Hospital and Health Service – Snowtown
- South Coast District Hospital – Victor Harbor
- South East Regional CHS
- Southern Yorke Peninsula Health Service (Yorketown) – Yorketown
- St Margaret's Hospital – Semaphore
- Strathalbyn and District Health Service – Strathalbyn
- Streaky Bay Hospital – Streaky Bay
- Tailem Bend District Hospital – Tailem Bend
- Tanunda War Memorial Hospital – Tanunda
- Queen Elizabeth Hospital – Woodville
- Tumby Bay Hospital and Health Services – Tumby Bay
- Waikerie Health Service – Waikerie
- Whyalla Hospital and Health Services – Whyalla
- Women's and Children's Hospital – North Adelaide
- Woomera Hospital – Woomera
- Wudinna Hospital – Wudinna

=== Private ===
- Adelaide Clinic – Gilberton
- Adelaide Day Surgery Pty Ltd – Adelaide
- Adelaide Eye & Laser Centre – Eastwood
- Adelaide Surgicentre – Kent Town
- Ashford Hospital – Ashford
- Burnside War Memorial Hospital – Toorak Gardens
- Calvary Adelaide Hospital – Adelaide
- Calvary Central Districts Hospital – Elizabeth Vale
- Calvary Connery Centre – Elizabeth Vale
- Calvary North Adelaide Hospital – North Adelaide
- Flinders Private Hospital – Bedford Park
- Fullarton Private Hospital – Parkside
- Glenelg Community Hospital Inc – Glenelg South
- Griffith Rehabilitation Hospital – Hove
- Kahlyn Day Centre – Magill
- McLaren Vale & Districts War Memorial Hospital Inc – McLaren Vale
- Memorial Hospital – North Adelaide
- Mount Gambier Private Hospital – Mount Gambier
- Oxford Day Surgery Centre – Unley
- Parkside Cosmetic Surgery – Parkside
- Parkwynd Private Hospital – Adelaide
- SPORTSMED SA Hospital & Day Surgery – Stepney
- St Andrew's Hospital – Adelaide
- Stirling Hospital – Stirling
- Western Hospital – Henley Beach
- Central Surgery Skin Cancer Removal – Dulwich

== Tasmania ==
=== Public ===
- Beaconsfield District Health Service – Beaconsfield
- Campbell Town Multi Purpose Service – Campbell Town
- Deloraine District Hospital – Deloraine
- Esperance Multi Purpose Centre – Dover
- Flinders Island Multi Purpose Centre – Whitemark
- George Town Hospital and Community Health Centre – George Town
- HealthWest (West Coast District Hospital at Queenstown) – Queenstown
- Huon Eldercare – Franklin
- King Island Multi Purpose Centre – Currie
- Launceston General Hospital – Launceston
- May Shaw District Nursing Centre – Swansea
- Mersey Community Hospital – Latrobe
- Midlands Multi Purpose Centre – Oatlands
- New Norfolk District Hospital – New Norfolk
- North East Soldiers' Memorial Hospital and Community Service Centre (Scottsdale Hospital) – Scottsdale
- North West Regional Hospital – Burnie
- Royal Hobart Hospital – Hobart
- Smithton District Hospital – Smithton
- St Helens District Hospital – St Helens
- St Marys Community Health Centre – St Marys
- Tasman Health and Community Service – Nubeena
- Toosey Memorial Hospital (Longford) – Longford

=== Private ===
- Calvary Lenah Valley Hospital – Lenah Valley
- Calvary St John’s Hospital – South Hobart
- Calvary St Luke’s Hospital – Launceston
- Calvary St Vincent’s Hospital – Launceston
- Hobart Private Hospital – Hobart
- St Helen's Private Hospital – Hobart
- The Eye Hospital – Launceston
- The Hobart Clinic – Rokeby

== Victoria ==
=== Public ===
==== Metropolitan Melbourne ====
- Angliss Hospital – Upper Ferntree Gully
- Austin Hospital – Heidelberg
- Box Hill Hospital – Box Hill
- Broadmeadows Hospital – Broadmeadows
- Bundoora Extended Care Centre – Bundoora
- Calvary Health Care Bethlehem – Caulfield South
- Caritas Christi Hospice – Kew
- Casey Hospital – Berwick
- Caulfield Hospital – Caulfield
- Craigieburn Health Service – Craigieburn
- Cranbourne Integrated Care Centre – Cranbourne
- Dandenong Hospital – Dandenong
- Footscray Hospital – Footscray
- Frankston Hospital – Frankston
- Healesville Hospital and Yarra Valley Health – Healesville
- Heidelberg Repatriation Hospital – Ivanhoe
- Jessie McPherson Private Hospital – Clayton
- Kingston Centre – Cheltenham
- Maroondah Hospital – Ringwood East
- Mercy Hospital for Women – Heidelberg
- Monash Children's Hospital – Clayton
- Monash Medical Centre – Clayton
- Moorabbin Hospital – Bentleigh East
- Peter James Centre – Burwood East
- Peter MacCallum Cancer Institute – Melbourne
- Panch Health Service – Preston
- Queen Elizabeth Centre – Noble Park
- Rosebud Hospital – Capel Sound
- Royal Children's Hospital – Parkville
- Royal Dental Hospital of Melbourne – Carlton
- Royal Melbourne Hospital – Parkville
- Royal Talbot Rehabilitation Centre – Kew
- Royal Victorian Eye and Ear Hospital – East Melbourne
- Royal Women's Hospital – Parkville
- Sandringham Hospital – Sandringham
- St George's Hospital – Kew
- St Vincent's Hospital – Fitzroy
- Sunshine Hospital – St Albans
- The Alfred Hospital – Melbourne
- The Mornington Centre – Mornington
- The Northern Hospital – Epping
- Wantirna Health – Wantirna
- Williamstown Hospital – Williamstown
- Yarra Ranges Health – Lilydale

==== Rural hospitals and health services ====
- Albury Wodonga Health
- Alexandra District Hospital
- Alpine Health
- Bairnsdale Regional Health Service
- Ballarat Health Services
- Barwon Health
- Bass Coast Regional Health
- Beaufort and Skipton Health Service
- Beechworth Health Service
- Benalla Health
- Bendigo Base Hospital
- Boort District Health
- Casterton Memorial Hospital
- Castlemaine Health
- Central Gippsland Health Service
- Cobram District Health
- Cohuna District Hospital
- Colac Area Health
- Djerriwarrh Health Services
- Dunmunkle Health Services
- East Grampians Health Service
- East Wimmera Health Service
- Echuca Regional Health
- Edenhope and District Hospital
- Gippsland Southern Health Service
- Goulburn Valley Health
- Heathcote Health
- Hepburn Health Service
- Hesse Rural Health Service
- Heywood Rural Health
- Inglewood and District Health Service
- Kerang District Health
- Kilmore and District Hospital
- Kooweerup Regional Health Service
- Kyabram and District Health Service
- Kyneton District Health Service
- Latrobe Regional Hospital
- Lorne Community Hospital
- Maldon Hospital
- Maryborough District Health Service
- Mansfield District Hospital
- Melton Health
- Mildura Base Hospital
- Moyne Health Services
- Nathalia District Hospital
- Northeast Health Wangaratta
- Numurkah District Health Service
- Omeo District Health
- Orbost Regional Health
- Otway Health and Community Services
- Portland District Health
- Robinvale District Health Services
- Rochester and Elmore District Health Service
- Rural Northwest Health
- Seymour Health
- South Gippsland Hospital
- South West Healthcare
- Stawell Regional Health
- Swan Hill District Health
- Tallangatta Health Service
- Terang and Mortlake Health Service
- Timboon and District Healthcare Service
- Upper Murray Health and Community Services
- Warrnambool Base Hospital
- West Gippsland Healthcare Group
- West Wimmera Health Service
- Western District Health Service
- Wimmera Health Care Group
- Yarram and District Health Service
- Yarrawonga Health
- Yea and District Memorial Hospital

=== Private ===
- Albert Road Clinic – Melbourne
- Avenue Plastic Surgery – Windsor
- Beleura Private Hospital – Mornington
- Bellbird Private Hospital – Blackburn South
- Berwick Eye and Surgicentre – Berwick
- Cabrini Brighton – Brighton
- Cabrini Health Elsternwick Rehabilitation – Glenhuntly Rd – Elsternwick
- Cabrini Health Elsternwick Rehabilitation – Hopetoun – Elsternwick
- Cabrini Malvern – Malvern
- Cabrini Prahran – Prahran
- Chesterville Day Hospital – Cheltenham
- Como Private Hospital – Parkdale
- Corymbia House – Dandenong
- Cotham Private Hospital – Kew
- Donvale Rehabilitation Hospital – Donvale
- Dorset Rehabilitation Centre – Pascoe Vale
- Epworth Cliveden – East Melbourne
- Epworth Eastern – Box Hill
- Epworth Freemasons [Clarendon Street] – East Melbourne
- Epworth Freemasons [Victoria Parade] – East Melbourne
- Epworth Hawthorn – Hawthorn
- Epworth Rehabilitation Brighton – Brighton
- Epworth Rehabilitation Camberwell – Camberwell
- Epworth Rehabilitation Richmond – Richmond
- Epworth Richmond – Richmond
- Frances Perry House – Parkville
- Glen Eira Day Surgery – Caulfield South
- Glenferrie Private Hospital – Hawthorn
- Healthscope Independence Services – Moorabbin
- Hobsons Bay Endoscopy Centre Altona – Altona
- Hobsons Bay Endoscopy Centre Sydenham – Sydenham
- Hobsons Bay Endoscopy Centre Werribee – Werribee
- John Fawkner Private Hospital – Coburg
- Jolimont Endoscopy – East Melbourne
- Knox Private Hospital – Wantirna
- Linacre Private Hospital – Hampton
- Manningham Day Procedure Centre – Templestowe Lower
- Maryvale Private Hospital – Morwell
- Masada Private Hospital – St Kilda
- Melbourne MediBrain & MediSleep Centre – Caulfield North
- Melbourne Oral & Facial Surgery – Melbourne
- Melbourne Private Hospital – Parkville
- Mercy Private Hospital - East Melbourne
- Mildura Private Hospital – Mildura
- Mitcham Private Hospital – Mitcham
- Mulgrave Private Hospital- Mulgrave
- Murray Valley Private Hospital – Wodonga
- North Eastern Rehabilitation Centre – Ivanhoe
- Northpark Private Hospital – Bundoora
- Peninsula Private Hospital Victoria – Frankston
- Ringwood Private Hospital – Ringwood
- Rosebud SurgiCentre – Rosebud West
- Shepparton Private Hospital – Shepparton
- Skin Only – Skin cancer specialty clinic
- South Eastern Private – Noble Park
- St John of God Ballarat Hospital – Ballarat
- St John of God Bendigo Hospital – Bendigo
- St John of God Berwick Hospital – Berwick
- St John of God Frankston Rehabilitation Hospital – Frankston
- St John of God Geelong Hospital – Geelong
- St John of God Langmore Centre – Berwick
- St John of God Warrnambool Hospital – Warrnambool
- St Vincent's Private Hospital East Melbourne – East Melbourne
- St Vincent's Private Hospital Fitzroy – Fitzroy
- St Vincent's Private Hospital Kew – Kew
- The Avenue Hospital – Windsor
- The Bays Hospital – Mornington
- The Geelong Clinic – St Albans Park
- The Melbourne Clinic – Richmond
- The Victoria Clinic – Prahran
- The Victorian Rehabilitation Centre – Glen Waverley
- Victoria Parade Surgery Centre – East Melbourne
- Wangaratta Private Hospital – Wangaratta
- Warringal Private Hospital – Heidelberg
- Waverley Private Hospital – Mount Waverley
- Werribee Mercy Hospital – Werribee
- Western Private Hospital – Footscray

== Western Australia ==
=== Public ===
- Albany Health Campus – Albany
- Armadale Health Service – Armadale
- Augusta Hospital – Augusta
- Bentley Hospital – Bentley
- Beverley Hospital – Beverley
- Boddington Health Service – Boddington
- Boyup Brook Soldiers Memorial Hospital – Boyup Brook
- Bridgetown Hospital – Bridgetown
- Broome Health Campus – Broome
- Bruce Rock Memorial Hospital – Bruce Rock
- Busselton Health Campus – Busselton
- Carnarvon Health Campusl – Carnarvon
- Collie Health Service – Collie
- Corrigin District Hospital – Corrigin
- Cunderdin Hospital – Cunderdin
- Dalwallinu Hospital – Dalwallinu
- Denmark Hospital and Health Service – Denmark
- Derby Hospital – Derby
- Dongara Eneabba Mingenew Health Service – Dongara
- Donnybrook Hospital – Donnybrook
- Dumbleyung Memorial Hospital – Dumbleyung
- Esperance Hospital – Esperance
- Exmouth Hospital – Exmouth
- Fiona Stanley Hospital – Murdoch
- Fitzroy Crossing Hospital – Fitzroy Crossing
- Fremantle Hospital – Fremantle
- Geraldton Hospital – Geraldton
- Gnowangerup Hospital – Gnowangerup
- Goomalling Hospital – Goomalling
- Graylands Selby-Lemnos and Special Care Health Service – Mount Claremont
- Halls Creek Hospital – Halls Creek
- Harvey Hospital – Harvey
- Hedland Health Campus – South Hedland
- Joondalup Health Campus (Public) – Joondalup
- Kalamunda Hospital – Kalamunda
- Kalbarri Health Centre – Kalbarri
- Kaleeya Hospital – East Fremantle
- Kalgoorlie Hospital – Kalgoorlie
- Katanning Hospital – Katanning
- Kellerberrin Memorial Hospital – Kellerberrin
- King Edward Memorial Hospital for Women – Subiaco
- Kojonup Hospital – Kojonup
- Kondinin Districts Health Service – Kondinin
- Kununoppin Health Service – Kununoppin
- Kununurra Hospital – Kununurra
- Lake Grace Hospital – Lake Grace
- Laverton Hospital – Laverton
- Leonora Hospital – Leonora
- Margaret River Hospital – Margaret River
- Meekatharra Hospital – Meekatharra
- Merredin Health Service – Merredin
- Moora Hospital – Moora
- Morawa Health Service – Morawa
- Mullewa Health Service – Mullewa
- Murray Hospital – Pinjarra
- Nannup Hospital – Nannup
- Narembeen Memorial Hospital – Narembeen
- Narrogin Hospital – Narrogin
- Newman Hospital – Newman
- Next Step Drug And Alcohol Services, East Perth – East Perth
- Nickol Bay Hospital – Karratha
- Norseman Hospital – Norseman
- North Midlands Health Service – Three Springs
- Northam Hospital – Northam
- Northampton Kalbarri Health Service – Northampton
- Onslow Hospital – Onslow
- Osborne Park Hospital – Stirling
- Paraburdoo Hospital – Paraburdoo
- Peel Health Campus – Mandurah
- Pemberton Hospital – Pemberton
- Perth Children's Hospital – Nedlands
- Pingelly Hospital – Pingelly
- Plantagenet Hospital – Mount Barker
- Princess Margaret Hospital for Children – Subiaco
- Quairading Hospital – Quairading
- Ravensthorpe Health Centre – Ravensthorpe
- Rockingham General Hospital – Cooloongup
- Roebourne Hospital – Roebourne
- Royal Perth Hospital Shenton Park Campus – Shenton Park
- Royal Perth Hospital Wellington Street Campus – Perth
- Selby Authorised Lodge – Shenton Park
- Sir Charles Gairdner Hospital – Nedlands
- South West Health Campus – Bunbury
- Southern Cross Hospital – Southern Cross
- State Forensic Mental Health Service – Mount Claremont
- St John of God Midland Public Hospital
- Tom Price Hospital – Tom Price
- Wagin Hospital – Wagin
- Warren Hospital – Manjimup
- Wongan Hills Hospital – Wongan Hills
- Wyalkatchem-Koorda and Districts Hospital – Wyalkatchem
- Wyndham Hospital – Wyndham
- York Hospital – York

=== Private ===
- Abbotsford Private Hospital – West Leederville
- Attadale Private Hospital – Attadale
- Bethesda Hospital – Claremont
- Colin Street Day Hospital – West Perth
- Glengarry Private Hospital – Duncraig
- Hollywood Private Hospital – Nedlands
- Joondalup Health Campus (Private) – Joondalup
- Mount Hospital – West Perth
- Oxford Day Surgery and Dermatology – Mount Hawthorn
- Perth Clinic – West Perth
- Sentiens Hospital – West Perth
- South Perth Hospital – South Perth
- St John of God Bunbury Hospital – Bunbury
- St John of God Geraldton Hospital – Geraldton
- St John of God Mt Lawley Hospital – Mount Lawley
- St John of God Midland Private Hospital
- St John of God Murdoch Hospital – Murdoch
- St John of God Subiaco Hospital – Subiaco
- Subiaco Private Hospital – Subiaco
- Waikiki Private Hospital – Waikiki
- Walcott Street Surgical Centre – Mount Lawley
- West Leederville Private Hospital, McCourt Street – West Leederville
- Westminster Day Surgery – Westminster

== See also ==
- Little Company of Mary Health Care (Australia)
- List of Australian hospital ships
- List of Australian psychiatric institutions
- History of public health in Australia
