= Joseph Charles Fowell =

Australian architect (1891–1970)

Joseph Fowell
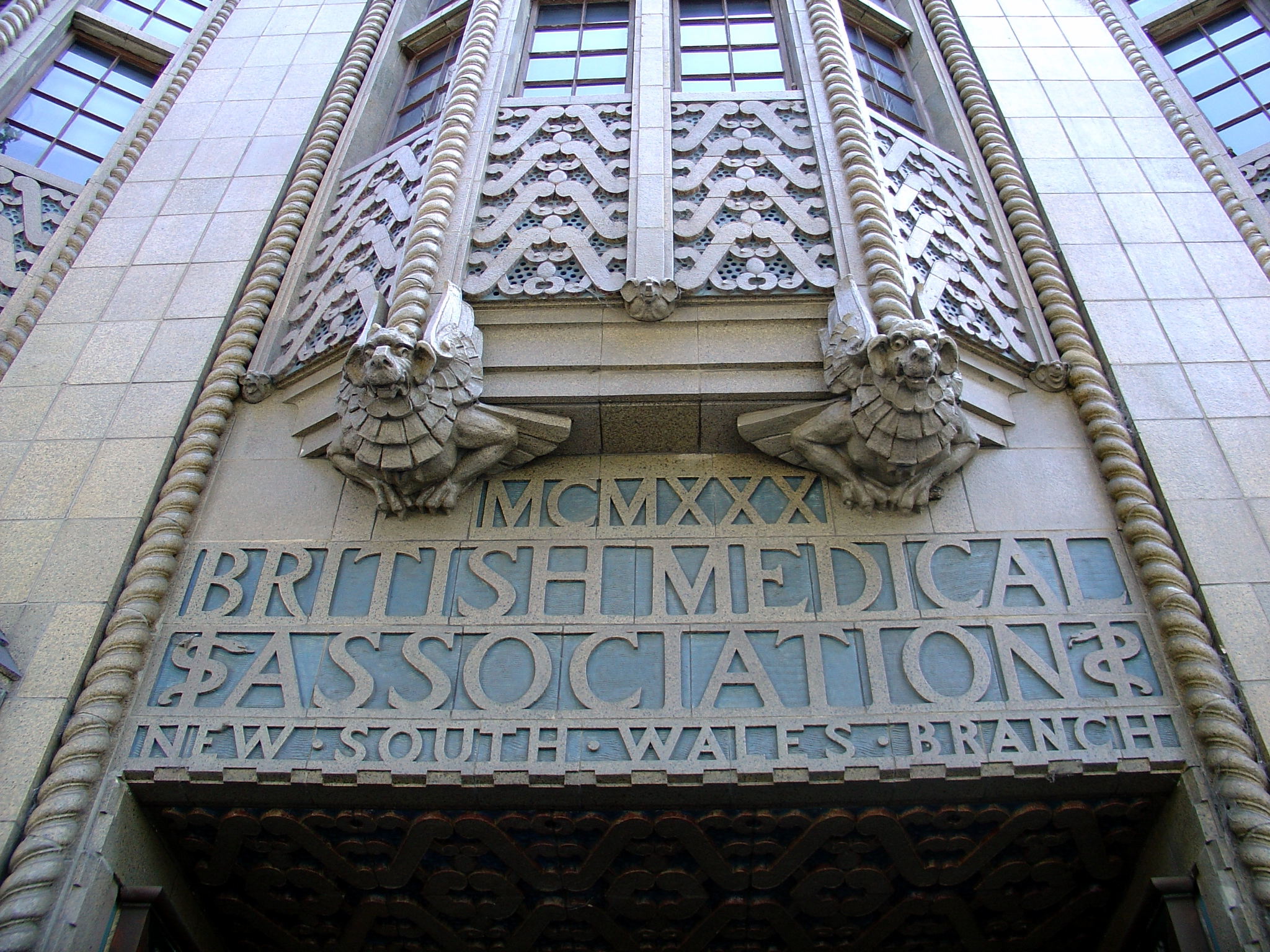
- Born: 2 August 1891; Albany, Western Australia
- Died: 3 July 1970 (aged 78); Bayview, Sydney, Australia
- Occupation: Architect
- Years active: 1928—1970
- Spouse(s): Ettie Spong Horne (1919—1939), Eileen Stella Hunt (1939—1970)
- Awards: RIBA Street Medal 1933, Sir John Sulman Medal 1935 & 1943, RAIA Gold Medal, 1962
- Practice: Fowell & McConnel: 1928—1939; Fowell & Mansfield: 1939—1946; Fowell, Mansfield & Maclurcan: 1946—1962; Fowell, Mansfield, Jarvis & Maclurcan: 1962—1970
- Projects: British Medical Association (BMA) House, P&O Building Sydney, Commonwealth Club, Gladesville Bridge
- Design: Churches and public buildings

Joseph Charles Fowell (2 August 1891 – 3 July 1970) was an Australian architect. Renown for his ecclesiastical architecture, Fowell was primarily responsible for the design of over forty churches in New South Wales and Victoria, including Catholic churches at North Sydney (1937), Parkes (1939) and Neutral Bay (1941).

== Background ==
Born in Albany, Western Australia and educated in England, Fowell returned to Australia in 1919 where he worked with Professor Leslie Wilkinson at Sydney University. In 1926 Fowell became an assistant to Henry Budden.

== Architecture firms ==
Fowell created a number of architectural partnerships including:

- Fowell & McConnel: 1928—1939, with Kenneth McConnel
- Fowell & Mansfield: 1939—1946 with J.L.S. Mansfield
- Fowell, Mansfield & Maclurcan: 1946—1962 with D.C.B. Maclurcan
- Fowell, Mansfield, Jarvis & Maclurcan: 1962—1970 with O.R. Jarvis

== Notable works ==
Year	Work	Firm	Location	Image	Award(s)	Comments	Notes
1930	British Medical Association (BMA) House	Fowell and McConnel	135-137 Macquarie Street, Sydney, NSW		RIBA Street Medal and Diploma, 1933	The first RIBA medal to be awarded in Australia.	
1935	St. Anne's Church	Fowell and McConnel	Blair & Mitchell Streets, Bondi, NSW		Sir John Sulman Medal, 1935	The first church to win this award. Later remodelled in 1964.	
1937	St Peter's, Church of England	Fowell and McConnel	Proston, Queensland				
1939	St Mary's, North Sydney		North Sydney, NSW				
1939	St Canisus' College		Pymble, NSW				
1941	St Joseph's		Neutral Bay, NSW				
1943	Orient Line Building	Fowell, McConnel & Mansfield	2-6 Spring Street, Sydney, NSW		Sir John Sulman Medal, 1943	Since remodelled.	
1956	St Augustine's Church	Fowell, Mansfield & Maclurcan	Meehan Street, Yass, NSW			Sculpture at this Church was created by prominent Australian Sculptor Tom Bass.	
1962	P&O	Fowell, Mansfield & Maclurcan	565 Hunter Street, Sydney, NSW		RAIA Gold Medal, 1962	Since remodelled.	
1965	Gladesville Bridge		Victoria Road, Drummoyne and Huntleys Point, NSW				
1967	Church of St Rose	Fowell, Mansfield, Jarvis & Maclurcan	Rose Street, Collaroy Plateau, NSW				
1967	Commonwealth Club	Fowell, Mansfield, Jarvis & Maclurcan	25 Forster Crescent, Yarralumla, ACT		Canberra Medallion, 1967		

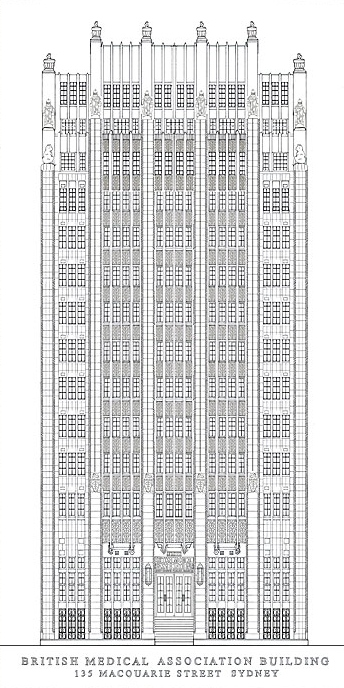
BMA House elevation.
