= Rosanna Capolingua =

Australian medical doctor (born 1959)

Rosanna Capolingua AM (born 26 January 1959) is an Australian doctor who served as federal president of the Australian Medical Association (AMA) from 2007 to 2009.

== Background ==
A graduate of the University of Western Australia, she was AMA (Western Australia) State President for two years and served on the Executive of the Federal AMA for four years. Capolingua was also Chair of the Federal AMA's Ethics and Medico-Legal Committee and the AMA Publishing Company.

She currently works as a general practitioner in Western Australia. Capolingua was once a member of the Liberal Party of Australia.

Capolingua was for a long time a board member of Healthway, a government-funded health promotion organisation, and served as its chairman for a period of time. She resigned from the role in February 2015 after an Australian Public Service Commission report found that she and other board members had misused privileges for their own personal benefit, including tickets to sports events provided by Healthway-sponsored teams. Premier of Western Australia Colin Barnett said that Capolingua's resignation was largely to do with governance failures. Capolingua suggested she had done nothing wrong but agreed to resign. She said ""I will lead the way by standing up and stepping aside."

Capolingua sued The West Australian for defamation following her resignation from the Healthway board. The case was settled, with The West Australian conceding that the statements made of Capolingua were defamatory.

Bob Cronin, the group editor-in-chief of West Australian Newspapers, stated: "The articles were published in circumstances where Dr Capolingua was (and still is) barred by statutory confidentiality obligations from disclosing information she obtained by reason of her role as Chair of Healthway, which prevented her from giving details of what went on at Healthway. The West accepts that Dr Capolingua was instrumental in initiating the Public Sector Commission review into Healthway’s access to and use of tickets, and took action to address inappropriate inclusion of tickets in sponsorship agreements and ensuring Healthway’s practices complied with Public Sector guidelines".

== Affiliations ==
Capolingua is a member of the:

- Medical Board of Western Australia, Professional Services Review Committee
- Board of MercyCare
- Director of General Practice Liaison at St John of God Subiaco Hospital, Subiaco

== Honours ==
Capolingua was appointed as a Member of the Order of Australia in the 2023 King's Birthday Honours for "significant service to patient care, to medicine, and as a role model to women".
