= St John of God Subiaco Hospital =

St John of God Hospital Subiaco
- St John of God Hospital
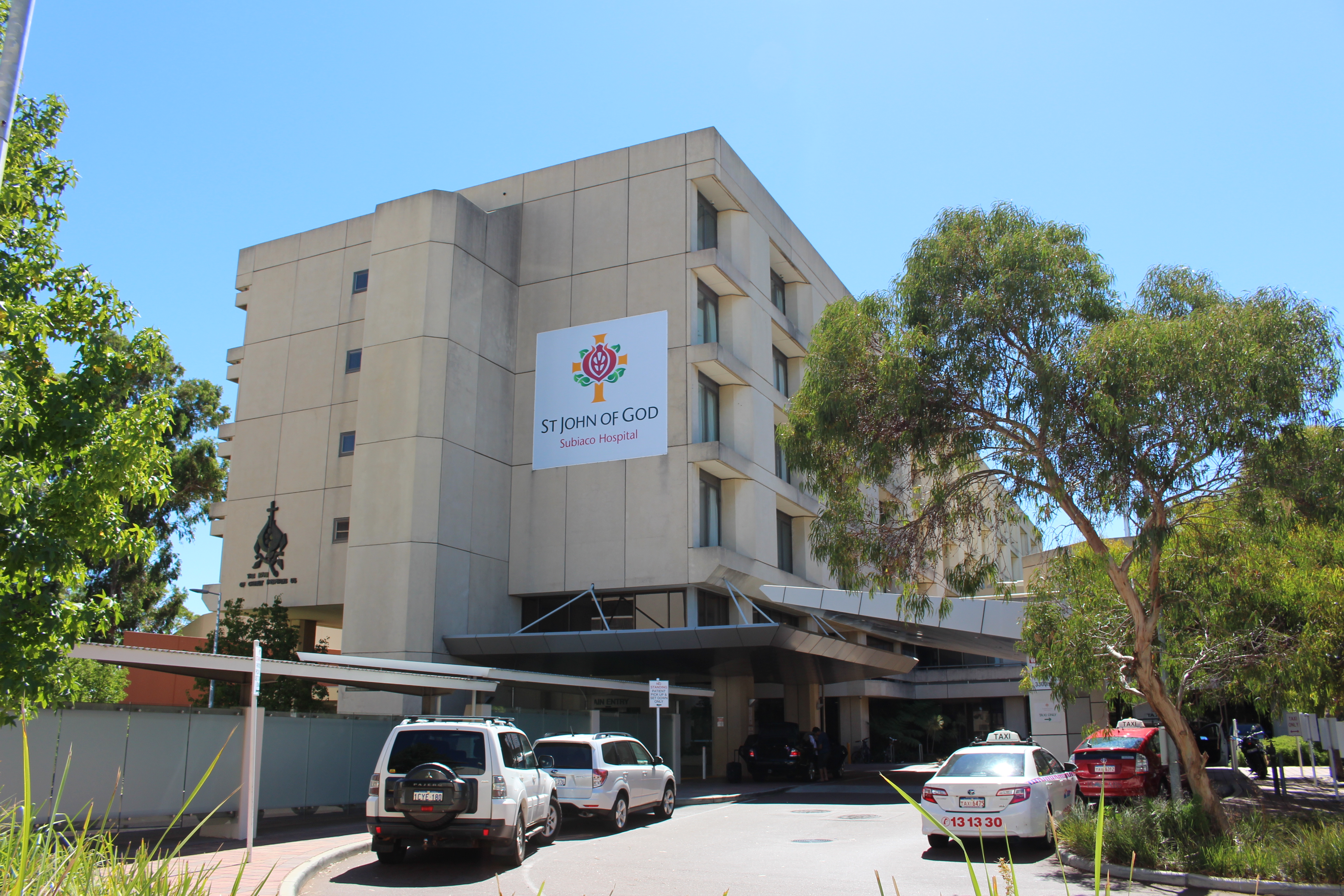

Geography
- Location: Subiaco, Town of Cambridge, Western Australia, Australia
- Coordinates: 31°56′29″S 115°49′32″E

Services
- Beds: 578

History
- Founded: 1898; 128 years ago

Links
- Website: www.sjog.org.au/subiaco
- Lists: Hospitals in Australia

St John of God Subiaco Hospital is a private hospital in Subiaco, Western Australia, founded in 1898.

== History ==
Archbishop of Perth Matthew Gibney invited eight sisters of St John of God to Western Australia in 1895 to help people with typhoid fever during the 1890s gold rush. He provided land for them to set up a hospital in a timber building in Subiaco, which opened on 19 April 1898 with fifteen beds, increased to thirty by 1900. The hospital accepted all patients – private, reduce-fee and free-bed – regardless of denomination, and distributed them throughout the buildings so that sisters were unaware of their status.

In 1939, the hospital had the second-largest maternity department in WA after King Edward Memorial Hospital. Babies born to single mothers were often adopted out, sometimes forcibly. In 2011, the hospital was among many institutions named in submissions to a Federal parliamentary inquiry into forced adoption in Australia. Files containing details of adoptions are kept at the hospital and some can be accessed by mothers, adoptees and their direct descendants.

The hospital was the first in Western Australia to install a da Vinci robotic surgical system. It is the oldest surviving hospital in Australia run by St John of God Health Care.

== Facilities ==
St John of God Subiaco Hospital has 578 beds and 20 operating theatres. The hospital also has an outpatient clinic, day surgery units and a conference centre, along with a cancer centre named after the Bendat family.

== Personnel ==
Former Australian Medical Association president Michael Gannon works at the hospital as an obstetrician and gynaecologist.

== Notable persons born at St John of God Hospital ==
- Michael Gannon
- Gina Rinehart

== See also ==
- List of hospitals in Western Australia
- List of hospitals in Australia
