= Andrew Miller (doctor) =

Australian anaesthetist

Andrew Miller is an Australian anaesthetist who was the president of the Australian Medical Association (WA).

He was educated at the University of Western Australia, Pennsylvania State University and Macquarie University. Along with his medical education, he has a legal degree, which has led him to be involved in the administration of not-for-profit organisations.

Miller was first elected to be president of the AMA (WA) in June 2016, having been vice-president for the previous two years. He succeeded Michael Gannon. The following year, he did not put himself up for re-election. In July 2019, he was elected president of the AMA (WA) again, and was re-elected the following year.

As AMA (WA) president, Miller has praised the Western Australian Government's handling of the COVID-19 pandemic and criticised the government for failing to learn from hotel quarantine breaches in other states, which has led to breaches in Western Australia. He has also called for Health Minister Roger Cook to resign after a seven year old died after failing to receive medical help at Perth Children's Hospital's emergency department for two hours.

Miller left the presidency of the AMA WA in June 2021, as the organisation's constitution says its president can only serve two consecutive years. He was succeeded by Mark Duncan-Smith.
