= Bondi, New South Wales =

Bondi
- Suburb
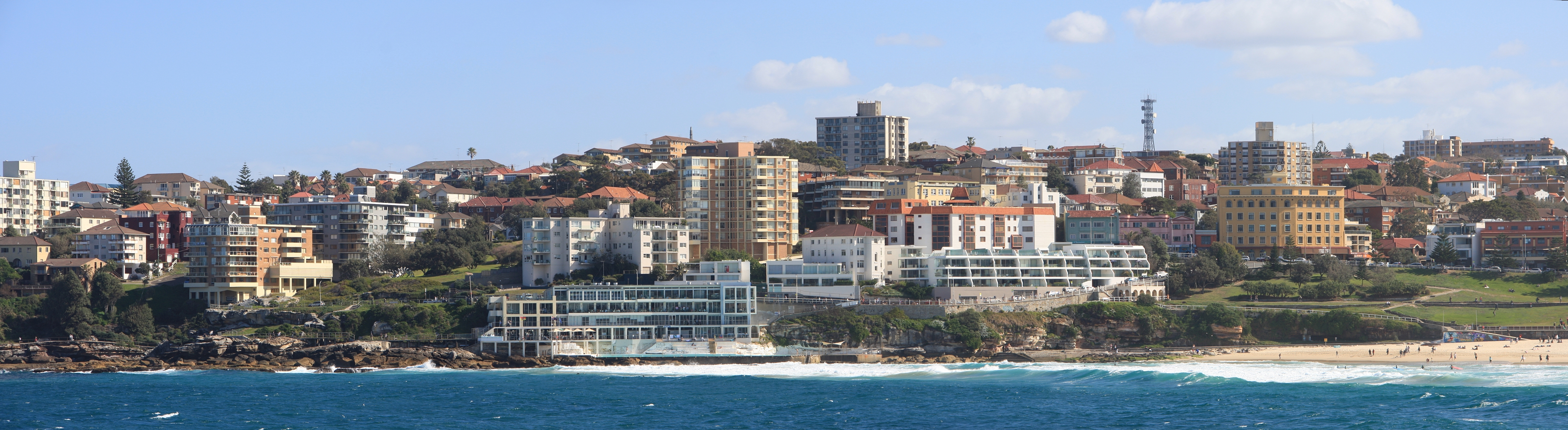
- Bondi, New South Wales

- Interactive map of Bondi
- Country: Australia
- State: New South Wales
- City: Sydney
- LGA: Waverley Council
- Location: 7 km (4.3 mi) east of Sydney CBD
- Established: 1851

Government
  - State electorates: Coogee; Vaucluse
  - Federal division: Wentworth

Area
  - Total: 0.87 km^{2} (0.34 sq mi)
- Elevation: 79 m (259 ft)

Population
  - Total: 10,411 (SAL 2021)
- Postcode: 2026
Suburbs around Bondi
Bondi Junction	Bellevue Hill	North Bondi
Bondi Junction	Bondi	Bondi Beach
Waverley	Bronte	Tamarama

Bondi (/ˈbɒndaɪ/) is a suburb of eastern Sydney, in the state of New South Wales, Australia, seven kilometres east of the Sydney central business district, in the local government area of Waverley Council.

== Geography ==
Bondi is a mostly medium and high-density residential area centred on Bondi Road, where the shopping area is situated. Bondi Beach is a neighbouring suburb and beach on the east side of Bondi. Bondi Junction is a neighbouring suburb and commercial centre to the west of Bondi. Tamarama, Bronte and Waverley are situated on the south side of Bondi.

== History ==
Bondi is reported to be derived from the Aboriginal word boondi meaning water breaking over rocks. It has been spelt a number of different ways over time, like Boondi, Bundi, and Bundye. The current spelling was accepted in 1827. The whole Bondi area was part of an 1809 land grant of 0.81 square kilometres (200 acres) to road-builder William Roberts. In 1851, Edward Smith Hall, editor of the Sydney Monitor, purchased the land for £200.

In the 1880s, Malcolm Campbell built Scarba, a two-storey, Italianate house in Wellington Street. It was later the residence of A.M. Loewenthal, an alderman in the local council. It was purchased by the New South Wales Government just before the First World War, then acquired by the Benevolent Society of New South Wales, who turned it into a children's welfare home known as Scarba House. This lasted until 1986, after which Scarba House became part of the Bondi Centre, which included a retirement village and various other welfare services. It is listed on the local government heritage register. It is now a residence within a large set of apartments on Ocean Street and Wellington Street.

Bondi Public School, located in Wellington Street, was built in 1883. It is also listed on the local government heritage register. Before that, the school ran from St Matthew's Church on Ocean Street, which is now one of the sites of Bondi Anglican Church.

Historically, the attractions in the area were Bondi Beach and the shopping centre at Bondi Junction (locally called 'the Junction'). The Bondi of this article developed as a predominantly residential area between the Junction and the beach, with a shopping strip along Bondi Road. Building styles are varied, with examples from the Victorian period (1840–1890), Federation (1890–1915), Inter-War (1915–1940) and contemporary. Terraces of Victorian shops alternate with Federation shops along Bondi Road.

There are a number of active community groups in Bondi. The Bondi Anglican Church is one of the churches and has three sites – at Bondi Junction, Bondi and Bondi Beach. The Wayside Chapel is another church working in Bondi Beach.

Waverley Rugby Club was founded in 1971 and is the local rugby union club, located in Bondi. Since its foundation, Waverley won the first Division Championship four times (in three of which won the First Grade title); Second Division twice; and Third Division once.

=== Trams ===
Tram services to North Bondi via Bondi Road and Campbell Parade from the CBD operated from either Circular Quay (via Bridge and Elizabeth Streets) or Railway Square (via Elizabeth and Liverpool Streets), to Oxford Street. The line then passed down Oxford Street to Bondi Junction, where it branched off from Bronte services, to run down Bondi Road to Fletcher Street, Campbell Parade and then to the North Bondi tram terminus. A feature of this line was the large three-track terminus cut into a hillside at North Bondi, which opened in 1946, as well as an underpass at 331a Bondi Road. Trams entered onto Campbell Parade via the underpass at a point where Bondi Road was too steep. The underpass and cutting have now been filled in, part of which is now public reserve and units.

The line opened in 1884 as a steam tramway to Bondi, then to Bondi Beach in 1894. Electric services commenced in 1902. The line closed in 1960. Current bus route 333 follows the former tram line as far as North Bondi.

A cross country tram line once operated from Bondi to Coogee. The line opened as a steam tramway in 1887, and was electrified in 1902. From 1910, through services operated from Bondi Beach to Coogee Beach, and later additionally from Waverley Depot to Coogee beach. This line branched off Bronte Road at Waverley and travelled south down Albion Street and Frenchmans Road, then via Frances and Cook Streets to join the Coogee line at Belmore Road in Randwick. The line was single track throughout, with a passing loop on Frenchmans Road. Initially services ran from the junction at Albion Street in Waverley to Randwick only, this was later extended to Coogee in 1907. It closed in 1954 and was replaced by bus route 314.

== Heritage listings ==
In addition to those listed above, Bondi has a number of other heritage-listed sites, including:

- 36 Anglesea Street: Electricity Substation No. 269
- 60 Blair Street: St Anne's Catholic Church, Bondi

== Demographics ==
According to the 2021 census, there were approximately 10,411 residents in Bondi, with 47.7% born in Australia. The most common other countries of birth were England 8.9%, South Africa 3.0%, Brazil 2.7%, New Zealand 2.4% and the United States of America 2.1%. 69.2% of people only spoke English at home, with other languages spoken at home being Spanish 4.5%, Russian 2.9%, Portuguese 2.8%, French 2.1% and Italian 1.7%.

The most common responses for religion in Bondi were No Religion 45.2%, Catholic 18.7%, Judaism 13.7% and Anglican 5.2%.

== Sport and recreation ==
Bondi is represented in one of the most popular sporting competitions across Australia, the National Rugby League competition, by the local team the Sydney Roosters, officially the Eastern Suburbs District Rugby League Football Club (ESDRLFC) and Bondi United in the South Sydney District Junior Rugby Football League competition.

== Media ==
Bondi FM, established in the early 2000s and broadcast 24 hours a day from the top of Hotel Bondi, became defunct in 2014. The current local radio offerings are Bondi Radio and Radio Bondi FM.

Bondi Vet is a veterinary television program focusing on a team of specialist vets, operating from a practice in North Bondi.

== Gallery ==
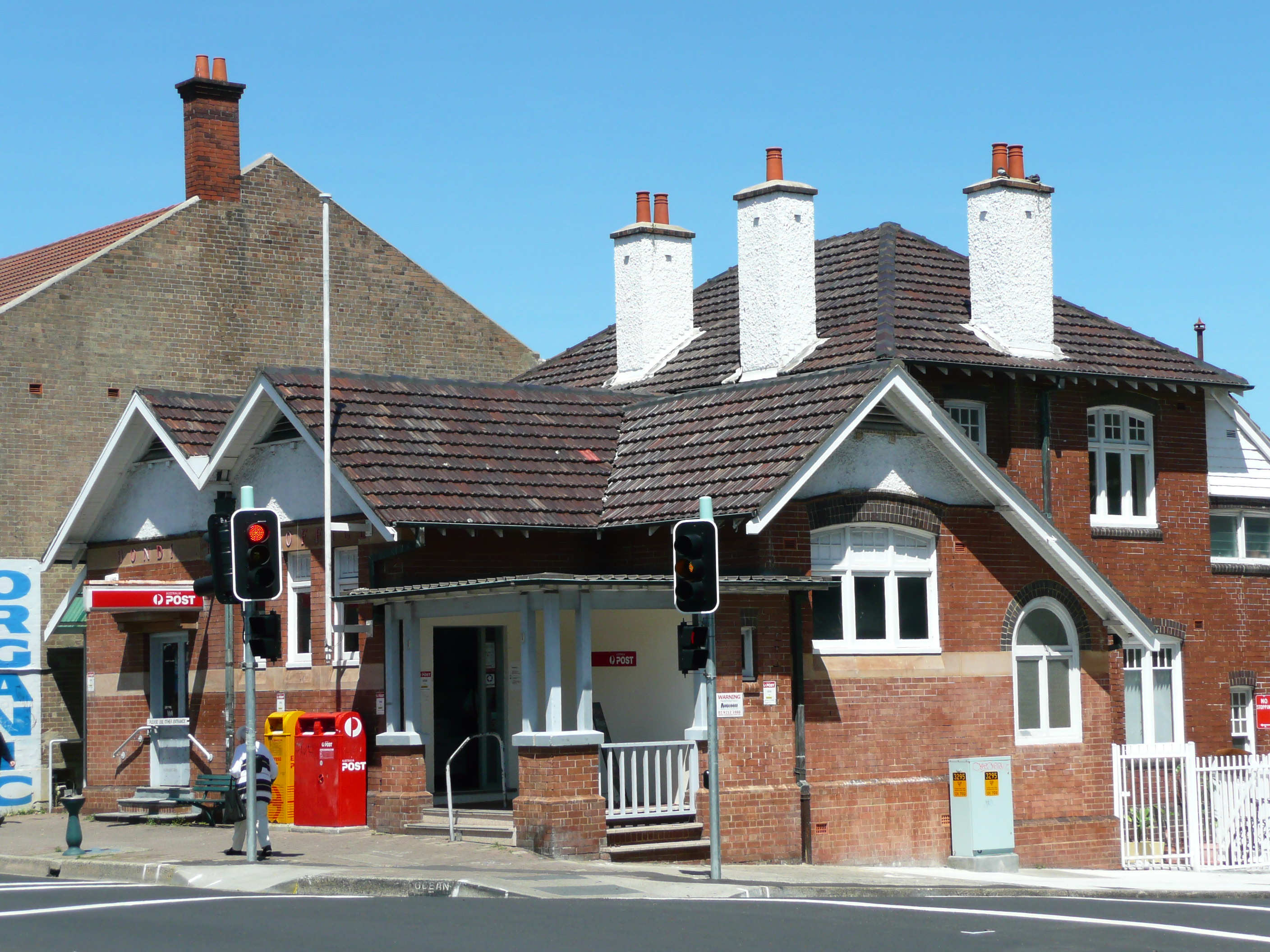
Bondi Post Office, Bondi Road, an example of the Arts and Crafts style

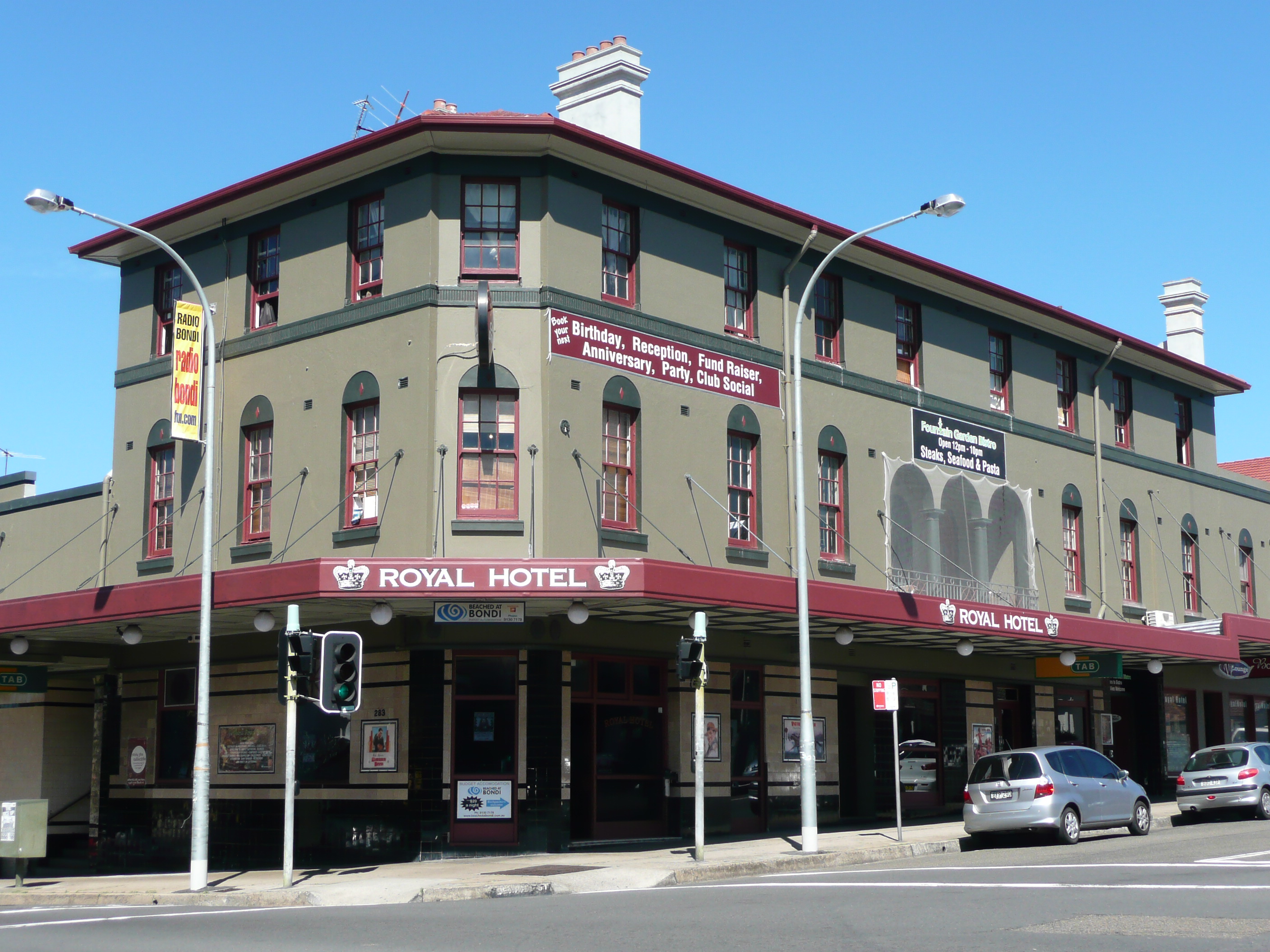
Royal Hotel, Bondi Road

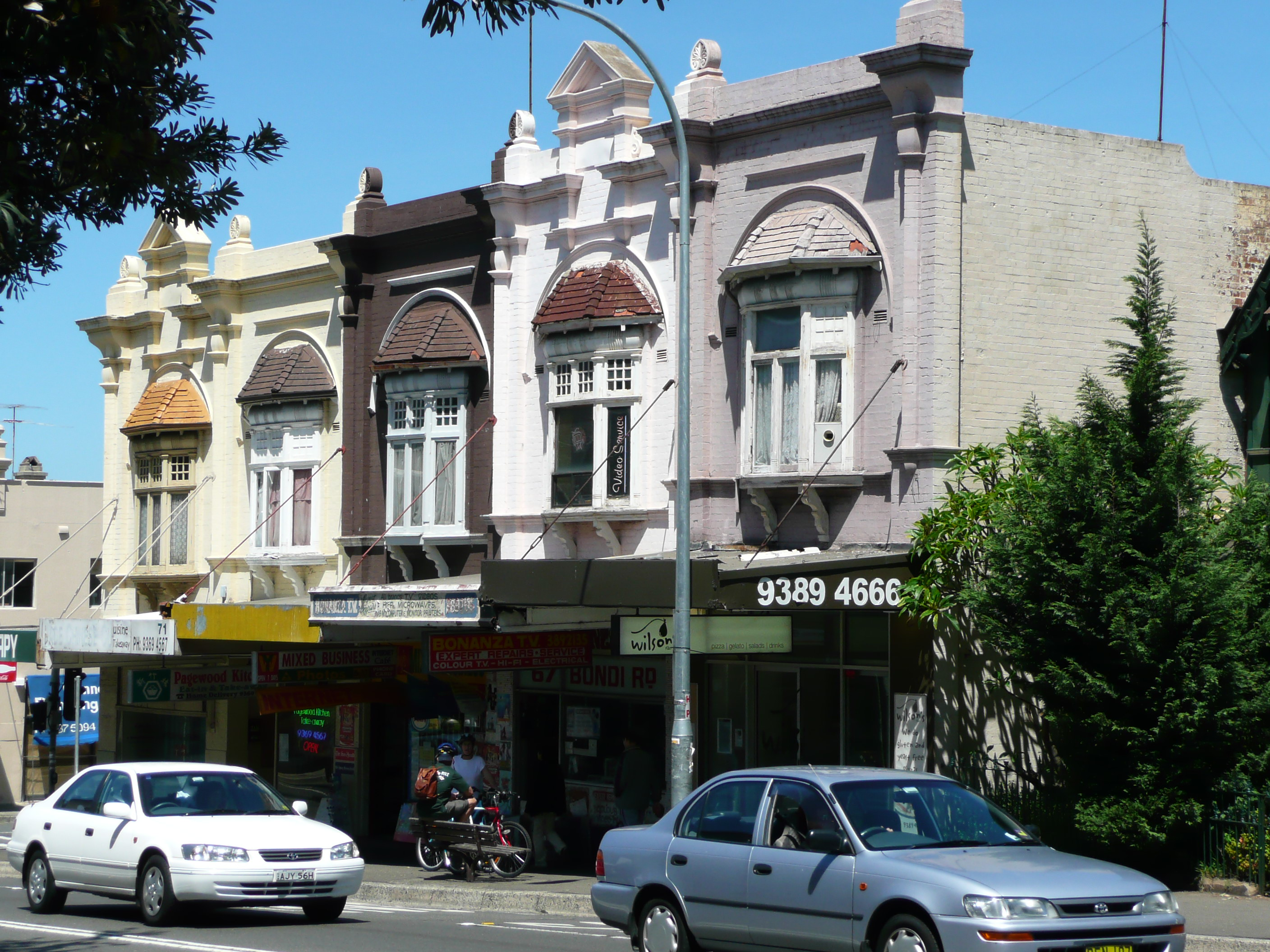
Shops and dwellings, Bondi Road

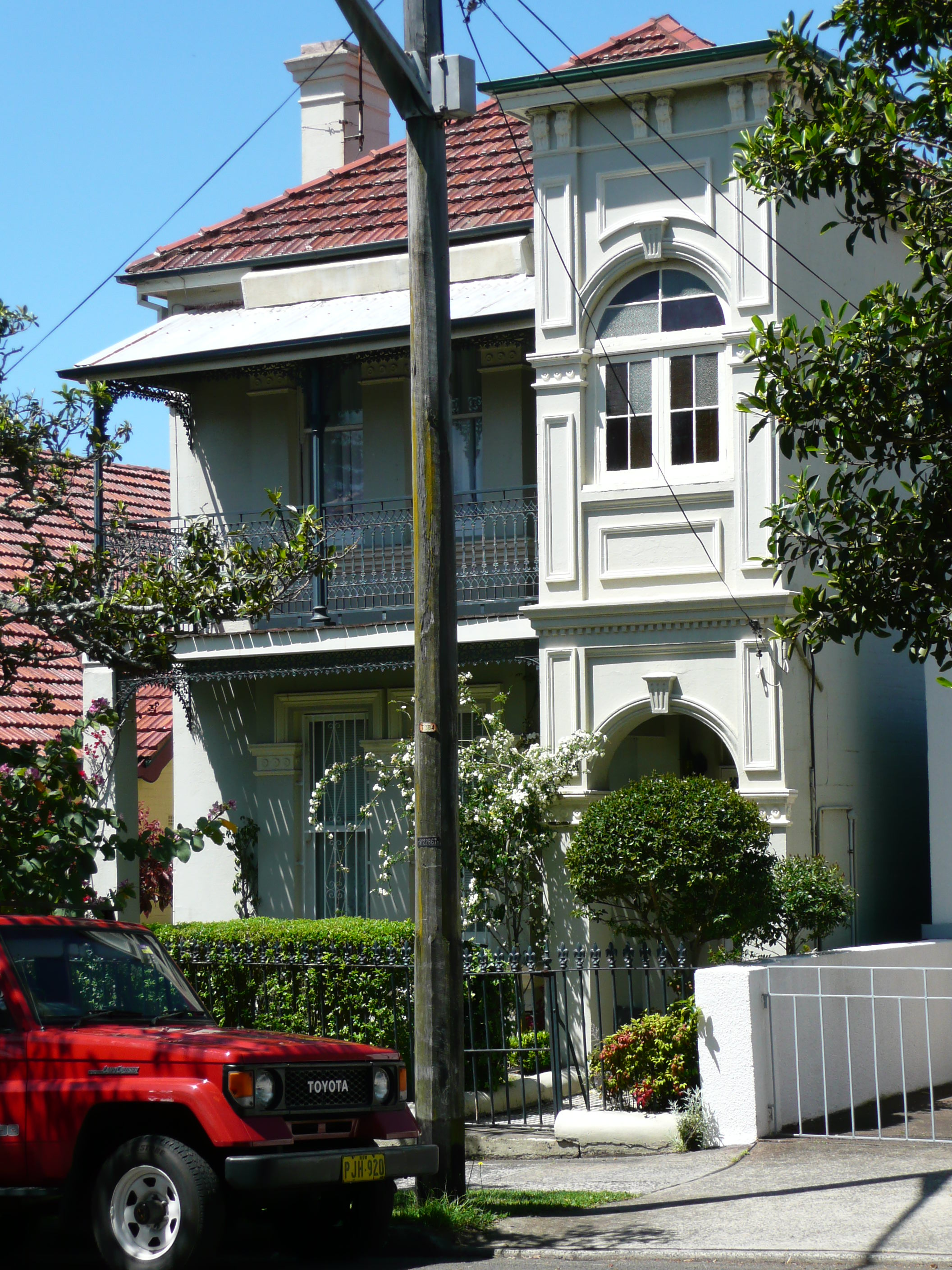
Victorian Italianate home, Bennet Street
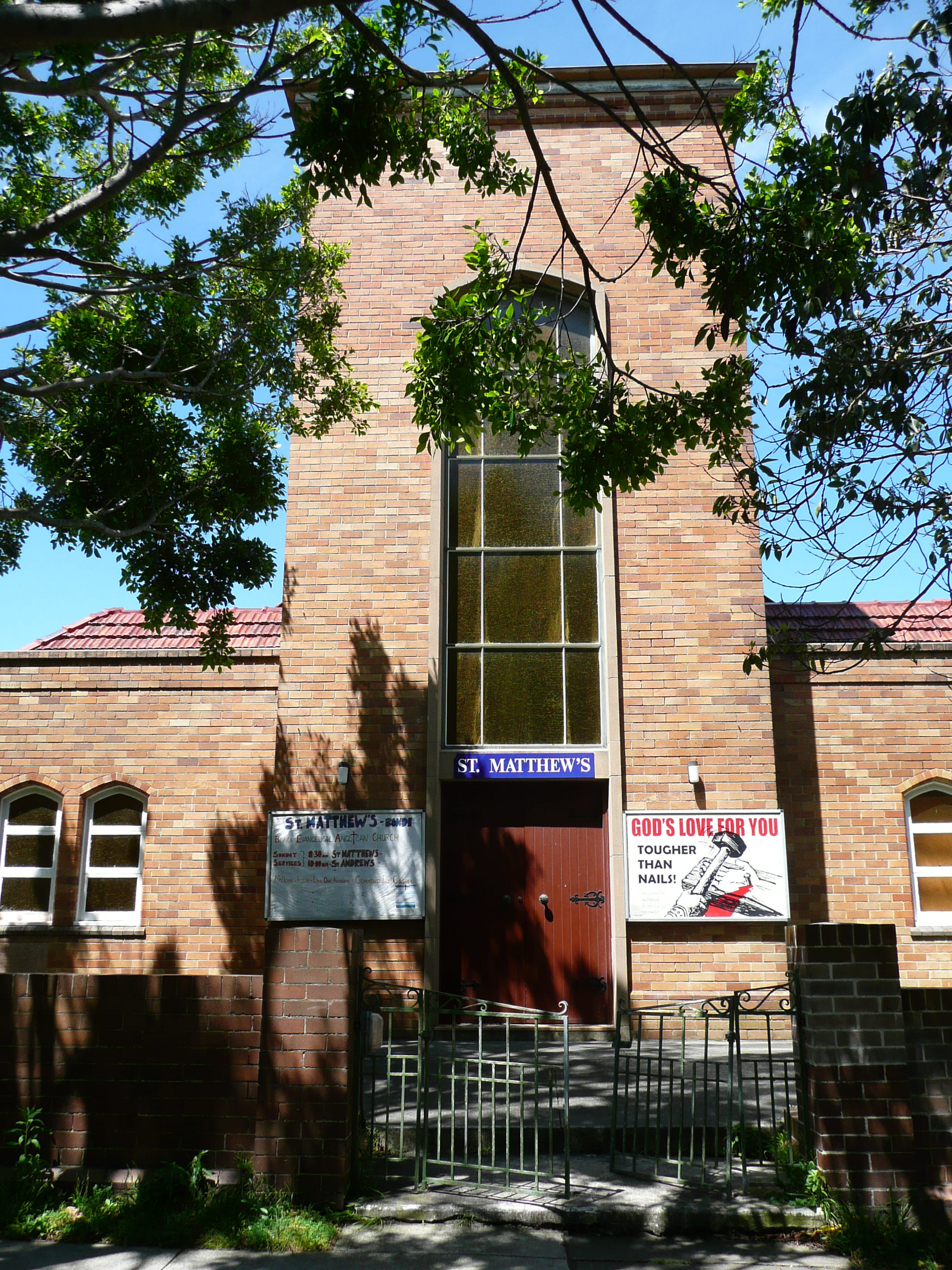
St Matthew's Anglican Church, Ocean Street

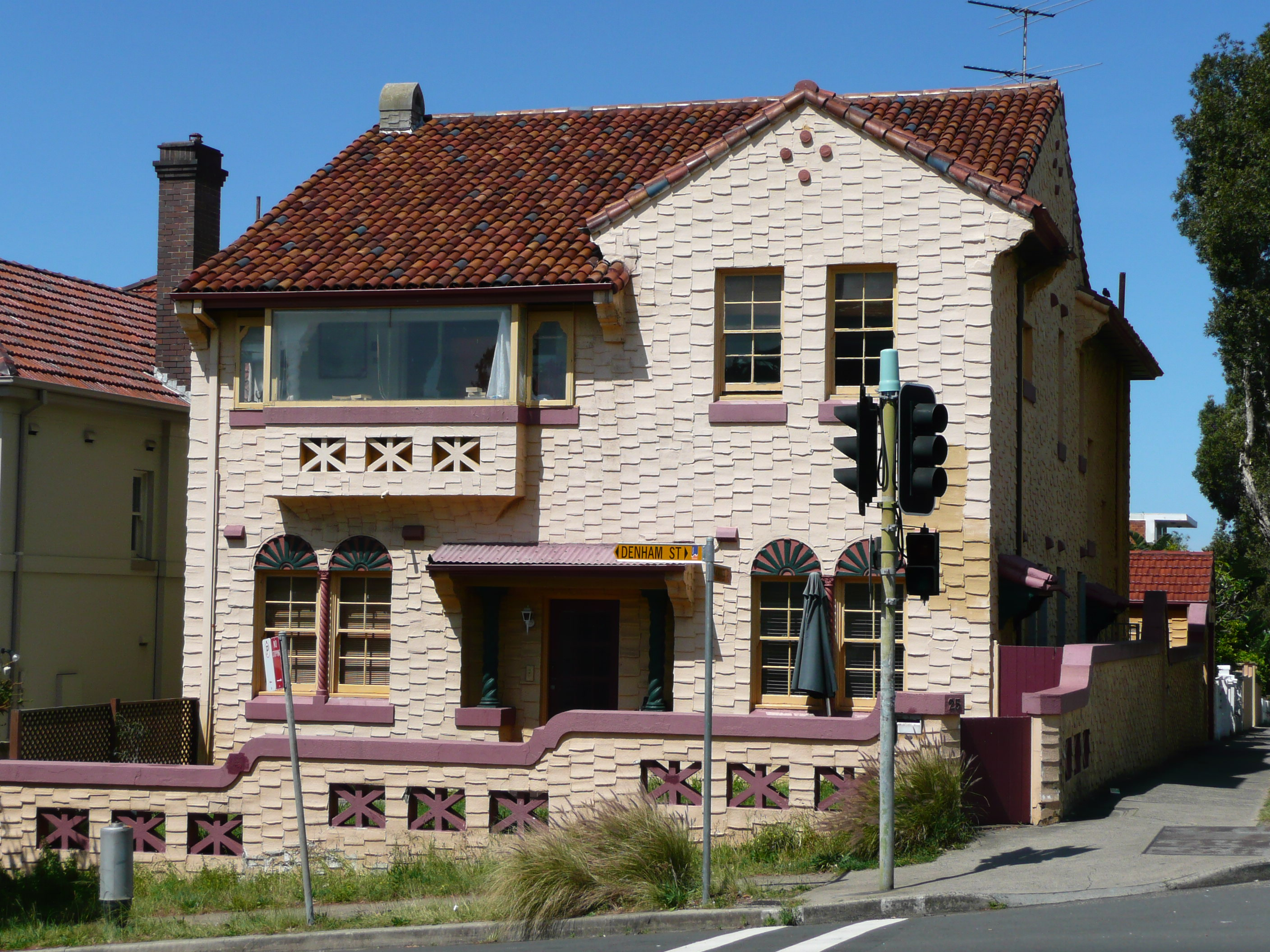
Residential building in Spanish Mission style, Denham Street

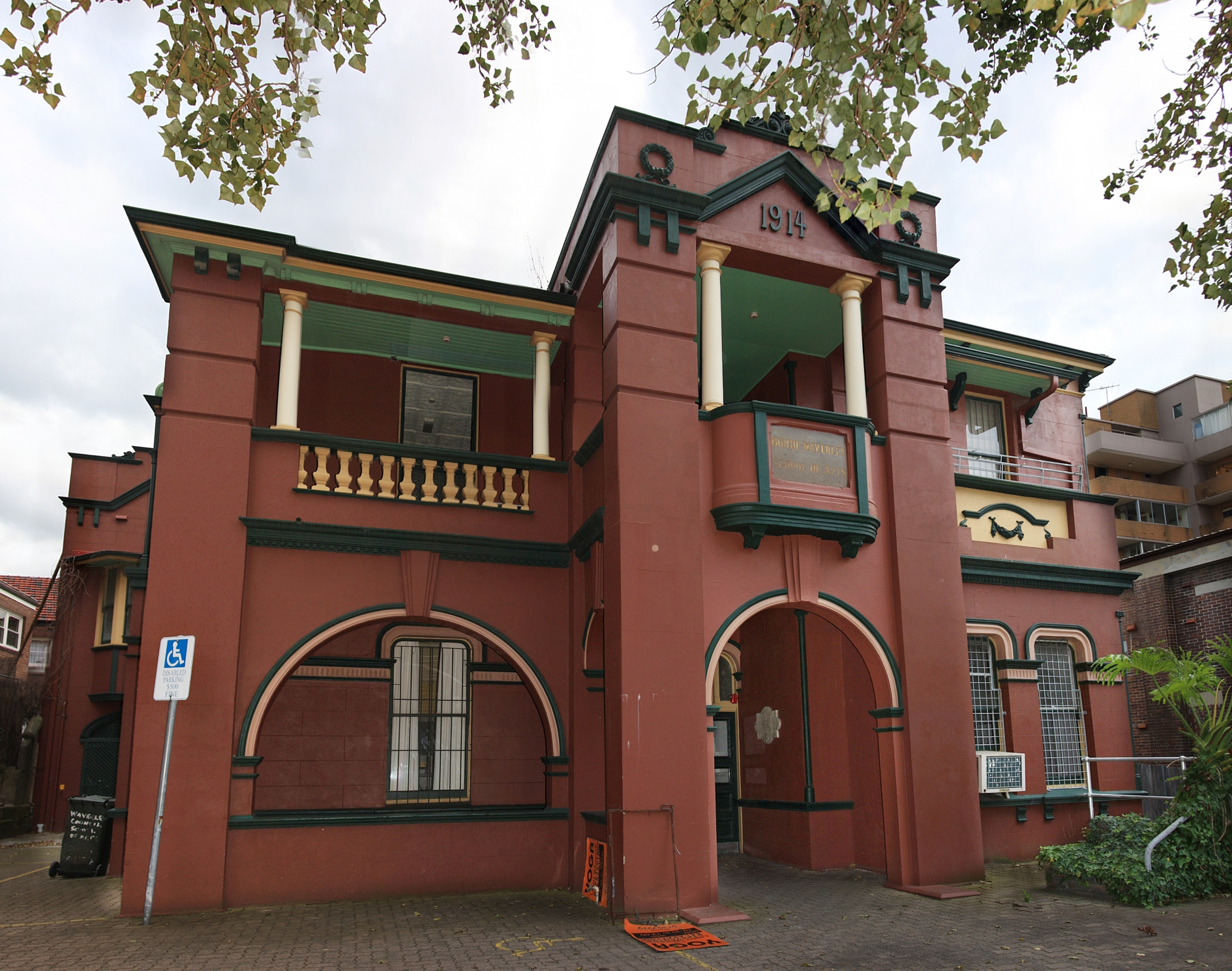
Bondi-Waverley School of Arts, Bondi Road
