= St Anne's Catholic Church, North Bondi =

St Anne's Catholic Church
- St Anne's Shrine
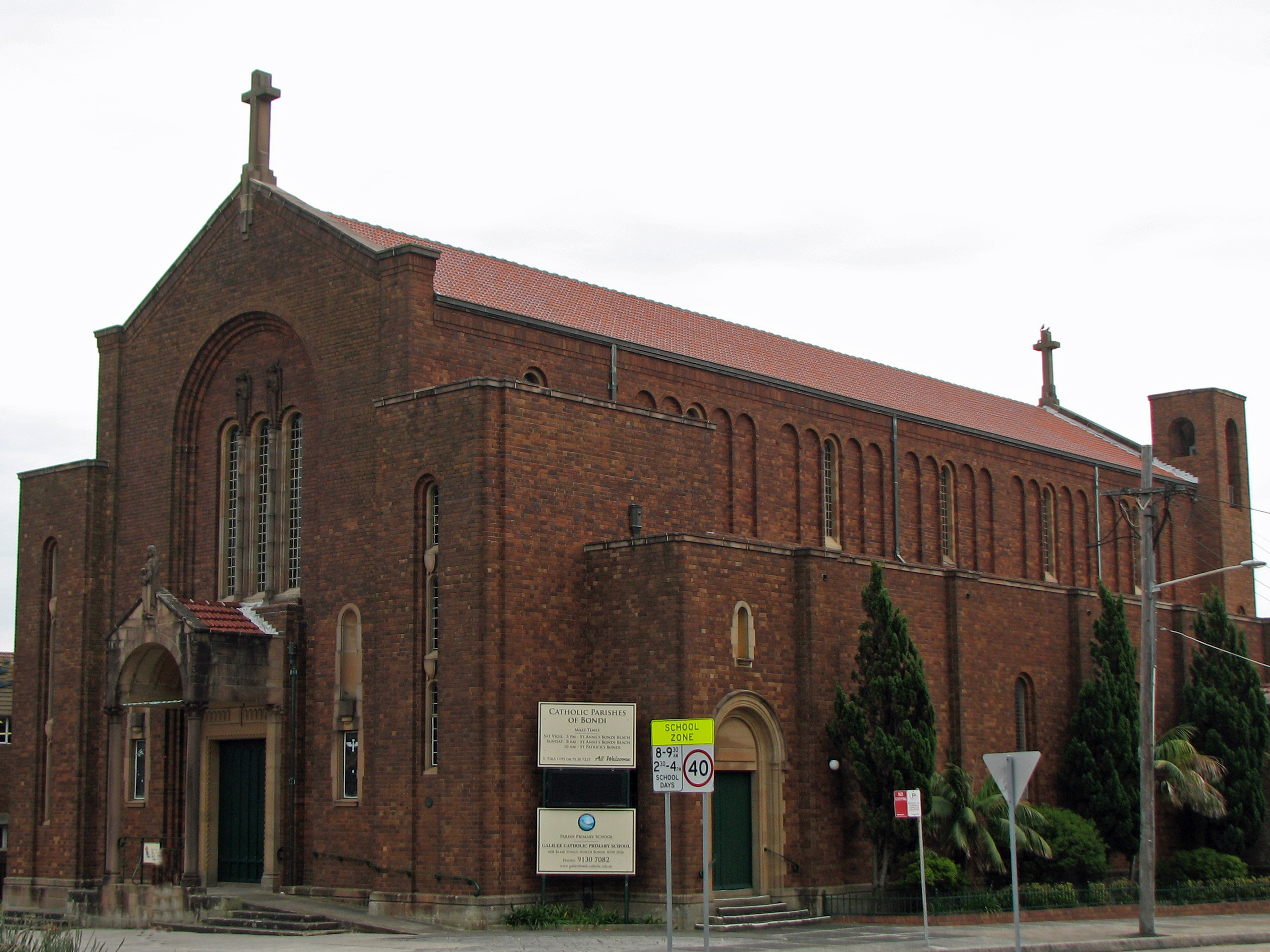
- St Anne's Catholic Church, North Bondi
- St Anne's Catholic Church
- 33°53′06″S 151°16′33″E
- Location: 60 Blair Street, North Bondi, Waverley Municipality, New South Wales
- Country: Australia
- Denomination: Roman Catholic
- Churchmanship: Trustees of The Sisters of Mercy
- Website: bondicatholic.org.au

History
- Status: Church
- Dedication: St Anne
- Dedicated: 1964 by Norman Thomas Cardinal Gilroy

Architecture
- Functional status: Completed
- Architects: Joseph Charles Fowell; Kenneth McConnel
- Architectural type: Church
- Style: Inter-War Romanesque
- Years built: 1934–1964

Administration
- Archdiocese: Sydney
- Parish: Bondi

Clergy
- Priest: Fr. Anthony Robbie

New South Wales Heritage Register
- Official name: St. Anne's Church; St Anne's Shrine
- Type: State heritage (built)
- Designated: 26 May 2006
- Reference no.: 1706
- Type: Shrine
- Category: Religion
- Builders: R. M. Bowcock

St Anne's Church is a heritage-listed Roman Catholic church located at 60 Blair Street, North Bondi, Waverley Municipality, New South Wales, Australia. The church was designed by Joseph Fowell and Kenneth McConnel, and built from 1934 to 1964 by R. M. Bowcock. It is also known as St. Anne's Church and St Anne's Shrine. The property is owned by the Sisters of Mercy and it was added to the New South Wales State Heritage Register on 26 May 2006.

== History ==
=== Indigenous history ===
Significant Aboriginal rock carvings provide evidence that Aboriginal people occupied sites nearby the location of St Anne's Shrine in Bondi Beach, long before European settlement. An important type of tool was first found in the region and is still known as the Bondi point. The indigenous people of the area at the time of European settlement have generally been referred to as the Sydney people or the Eora (Eora means "the people"). There is no clear evidence for the name of the particular groups of the Eora people that occupied what is now the Waverley area. Most sources agree on the Cadigal but there are sources which name the Biddigal and Birrabirragal bands as well. A number of place names within Waverley - most famously Bondi - have been based on words derived from Aboriginal languages of the Sydney region. By the mid nineteenth century the traditional owners of this land had typically either moved inland in search of food and shelter, or had died as the result of European disease or confrontation with British colonisers. Few religious beliefs of the people were recorded, but oral traditions have ensured that some have been carried on.

=== Background to the Parish of St Anne ===
From 1895 the Catholic Church was present in the Bondi area on land gifted to the Franciscan order at the corner of O'Brien and Simpson Streets. Rapid population growth in the area resulted in the parish of Bondi being divided in 1925, creating a new parish of St Anne's, Bondi Beach. Father Daniel O'Sullivan was appointed priest in 1926 to the new parish and oversaw the establishment of several major church buildings during his fifteen years of stewardship. A new site bordered by Blair Street, Mitchell Street, and Oakley Road was purchased in 1926. The year following the demolition of the older St Anne's church in O'Brien Street witnessed the construction of a new church school on the Oakley Road side of the new site. This was followed by a presbytery on Mitchell Road in 1932, and the first section of St Anne's Shrine fronting onto Blair Street in 1934. Also constructed during this period was St Anne's Convent in 1935 (built by the Sisters of Mercy) and a girls' school in 1938.

The initial brief for St Anne's Shrine required that the church be built in two stages as only half of the proposed budget of A£20,000 was available. In 1934 only the back, southern section of the church including nave and aisles was completed. In 1957 a newly appointed Father Patrick Cunningham set up a Parish Building Fund to raise money for building the northern section of the church comprising sanctuary, sacristies and altar. In 1964 the completed church was solemnly blessed by the Archbishop of Sydney, Norman Thomas Cardinal Gilroy.

Interior aspects of the 1964-designed church were later adjusted in view of the liturgical changes that followed the Second Vatican Council. In 1980, when Father Kenneth Sargeant was appointed parish priest, a stone altar was placed in the sanctuary to allow the priest to celebrate Mass facing the congregation. Also the church was carpeted throughout.

=== Building the church ===
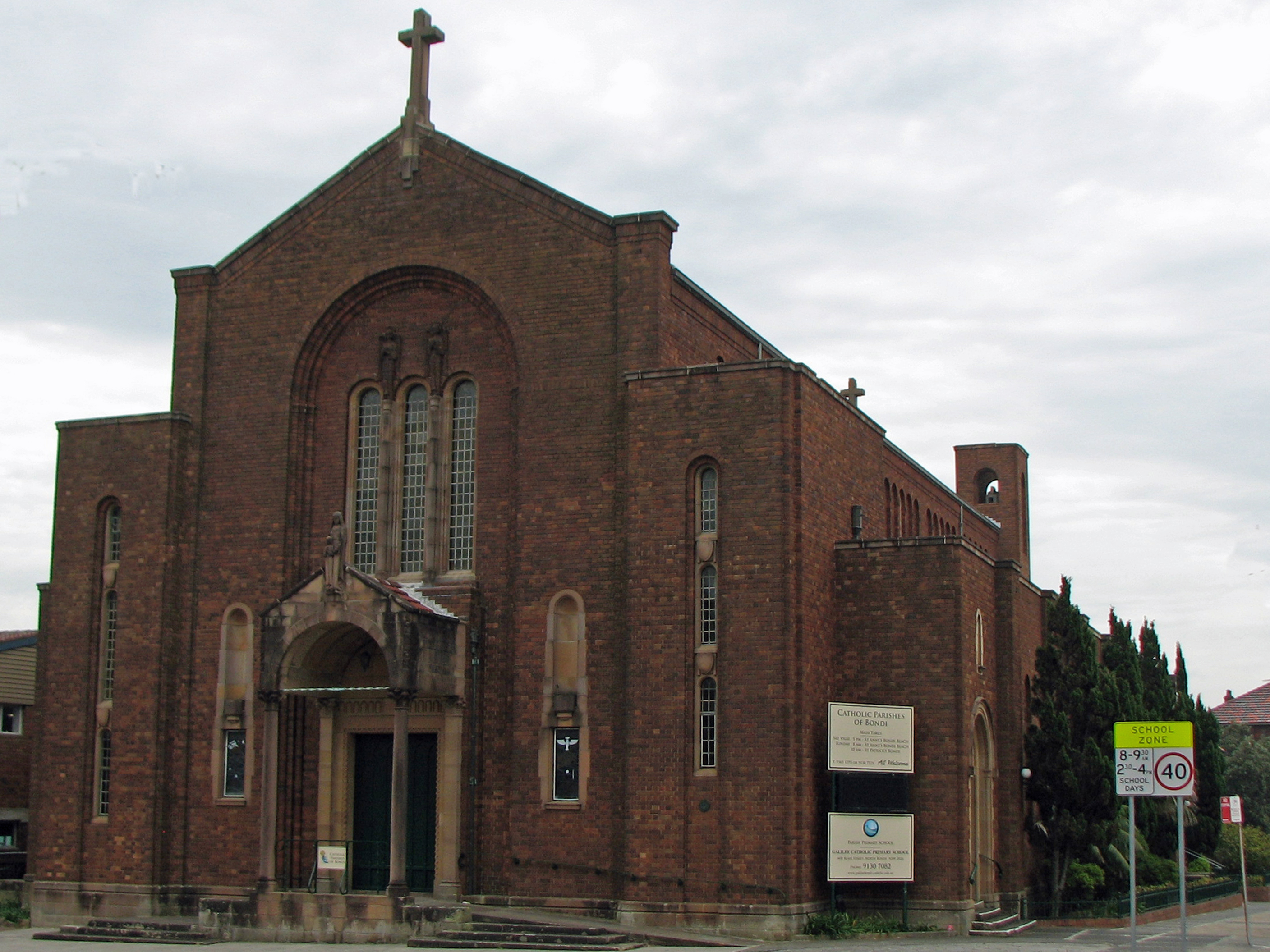
St Anne's Catholic Church, North Bondi

In 1934, the architects Fowell and McConnel won a design competition for a new Catholic Church at Bondi, judged by Leslie Wilkinson. The practice of Fowell and McConnel was established in 1927 when the pair entered a competition for the design of Tamworth War Memorial Town Hall for which they were awarded second place. They were more successful in winning the competition for the BMA building in Sydney's Macquarie Street, which also eventually won them the first RIBA medal to be awarded in Australia. Born in Australia but educated in England, Joseph Fowell (1891-1970) arrived back in Australia in 1919 where he taught under Leslie Wilkinson at the University of Sydney. The partnership went on to design a number of Catholic churches in Sydney and some New South Wales country towns. Kenneth McConnel left the practice in 1939 due to ill health. After World War II, McConnel formed a new partnership with Stanley Smith which was eventually to become McConnel Smith and Johnson.

Fowell and McConnel designed a church to accommodate 1,000 parishioners with separate committee rooms, campanile and cloister to be added when money became available. The first stage of the church was completed in 1934 with R. M. Bowcock as its builder. The north end of the building was enclosed by a timber framed wall, faced with fibre cement sheeting that marked the position of the future sanctuary. The north end of the church was completed with the addition of the apses some thirty years later to an amended design by Fowell, Mansfield, Jarvis and Maclurcan (Joseph Fowell being one of the original architects). The free standing campanile and linking cloister, which was part of the original concept, was not built.

==== Architectural accolades ====
St Anne's Church was awarded the Sir John Sulman Medal by the Royal Australian Institute of Architects in 1935. It was the first church building to receive the medal and remains the only complete church building to have received the medal (although additions to St Michael's Church were awarded the Sulman Medal in 1942).

In his history of the Sulman Medal, Andrew Metcalfe described the church as "a tour de force of brickwork construction with highlights of sandstone trim", and "perhaps the highlight of ecclesiastical architecture in interwar Sydney". He suggests it is stylistically related to and contemporaneous with the English architecture of Guildford Cathedral (c. 1932), St Saviour's, Eltham (c. 1933), St Wilfrid's, Brighton (c. 1934) and St Andrew's, Luton (c. 1932), all of which are linked to twentieth century Swedish architecture, notably Ragnar Östberg's Stockholm City Hall (1911-1923).

The National Trust's Jacqui Goddard described the church as:

"... absolutely, vitally important . . . An incredibly fine example . . . Of interwar architecture, with a lot of international influence . . . The interior is reasonably austere . . . But with very beautiful Australiana in its detailing".

— Jacqui Goddard, National Trust of Australia.

The church is featured in A Pictorial Guide to Identifying Australian Architecture, where it is presented as an example of the "Inter-War Romanesque" style. There it is described as a "nobly scaled design influenced by French examples such as Albi Cathedral" and Joseph Fowell listed as one of the style's "key practitioners".

== Description ==
St Anne's Church is a fine example of Inter-War Romanesque church architecture. The textured red brick façade contrasts with the sandstone plinth, entry portico, door and window surrounds and parapet copings. The roof is of red tiles over the nave and aisles, and copper over the northern apses. The south (Blair Street) elevation of the church features a sandstone portico with a gabled roof supported by sandstone columns and pilasters, described as "outstanding" in the Waverley Council heritage inventory file. A statue of St Anne with the child Mary forms the finial to the portico gable. The chamfered corners of the sandstone parapet wall to the portico gable are carved with gargoyles supporting saints. The corners of the sandstone entry door reveals are carved with a chevron pattern. Above the mullions to the three windows over the entry portico are two figures of angels. These were formed by carving green pressed bricks which were then fired and rebuilt in position. All other bricks in the building were apparently hand brushed by university students to give the façade a subtle texture. The main east and west gables of the church have sandstone crosses as finials.

Cream bricks internally blend with the sandstone trim to the arches, window reveals and sculptures. The plan of the church is based on an axial nave and aisles terminating in apses at the sanctuary end. A shrine to house a relic of St Anne is placed on the west aisle. A panelled timber confessional is located at the southern end of this aisle. The piety store (originally another confessional) at the southern end of the eastern aisle is of a similar style to the two confessionals on the western side of the church, but has been altered. The nave ceiling is constructed of panels of redwood timber boarding between trusses. The aisles also have panelled redwood boarded ceilings with recessed amber glass lights. Below the gallery, the ceiling is timber panelling. Twelve Stations of the Cross are located between the aisle arches and windows and at the south end of the church over the arches to the side aisles. Brick corbels beneath the stations contain lights to illuminate the stations at night. Ten bronze pendant lanterns designed by the architects light the nave. Cranked concrete buttresses hidden in the walls are connected horizontally by a beam in the nave waft below the clerestory. The aisle roof carries the weight of the nave, roof trusses to the foundations. A gallery at the rear of the church is supported on hardwood adzed beams themselves supported on stone piers. To alleviate problems of echo on the face brick the rear internal wall of the gallery is built with honeycomb brickwork with the interstices backed with small squares of an acoustic material, Celotex. The timber pews are original and were probably designed by the architects. The church had timber flooring with modern red carpet on the aisles between the pews, however green carpet covering the entirely of the nave and aisles flooring was introduced first in 1980 and expanded to cover all but the sanctuary in the late 1990s. All carvings in the church were executed by Mr Magness M. Swan to the design of the architect.

The apses on the north side were not built in the initial work of the 1930s but were constructed in the 1960s under the supervision of Joseph Fowell, one of the original architects, and form an harmonious addition. A half dome over the nave apse is lined with timbers in a herringbone radiating arrangement supported on a semi circular sandstone arcade. The apse houses a sandstone baldachino, designed to complement the arcade. The apse to the eastern aisle was also built at this time. The apse for the western aisle which was part of the original scheme was not built.

The foundations were built of sandstone from the quarry in Clyde Street, North Bondi. The Catholic Weekly of 7 December 1994 is quoted as stating that its statues are also of sandstone from the local quarry.

The interior is distinguished by a technically innovative ventilation system consisting of holes in the floor covered by ventilation boxes (hidden under pews) that could be opened by pulling on a drawstring to allow cool air from under the church to circulate throughout. On hotter days a motorised fan stored below the church could be activated to extract hot air from the ceiling of the church, thus aiding the convection process. A parishioner had been carrying out electrical maintenance on this system for much of the past 55 years that he had been attending the church. This ventilation system has been recently dismantled as part of a redesign of the spacing of the pews to allow for larger parishioners. However the removal of ventilation boxes and the filling in of the holes in the floor are reversible and the ventilation machinery remains intact, enclosed in a small sealed room under the church.

=== Condition ===
As at 29 January 2004, the building is generally in good condition. However, there is a structural crack at the south end and much of the timberwork is in need of refinishing.

The church is substantially intact in exterior and interior fabric although there have been many minor changes to the interior in recent years including carpeting, removing the altar rail, relocating altar gates and baptistry font, and dismantling the ventilation system. Many of the items that have been removed are being stored underneath the church.

=== Modifications and dates ===
Although the main body of the church was constructed in 1934, the second stage including final altar and apses were not completed until 1964, under the supervision of one of the original architects, Joseph Fowell.

Carpet was laid in the nave in 1980 and relaid in the late 1990s, and now includes the aisles. In 1999 the altar gates were removed and later repositioned on the eastern aisle. Other recent internal changes include: removing ventilation boxes from beneath the end of the pews and plugging the associated ventiation holes in the floor; removing several rows of pews and re-spacing the rest to allow for the comfort of larger parishioners; re-locating the baptismal font from the rear of the church to under the apse and then to the western front of the nave; installing glass panelling and doors at the end of the nave to provide a quiet "crying room" for parents of young children; replacement of two exterior light fittings with spherical lightbulbs; removal of six bronze candlesticks from the altar; removal of the altar rail.

== Heritage listing ==
As at 2 February 2004, St Anne's Church is of State significance as a fine and representative example of the Inter-war Romanesque style. A Catholic church largely built in the 1930s but completed in the 1960s to the competition-winning design of Joseph Fowell and Kenneth McConnel, the decorative scheme is restrained but features highly crafted timber, brick and sandstone detailing. It has a careful integration of furniture and fittings also largely designed by the architects that includes an ingenious and possibly unique ventilation system (recently dismantled but stored onsite). Winner of the Royal Australian Institute of Architects' 1935 Sulman Award, this is the only church to win this prestigious award as a complete design, and has been described as "perhaps the highlight of ecclesiastical architecture in interwar Sydney". Its representative significance is enhanced by its continuing role and positioning as a landmark element in a church-school precinct of buildings. This precinct also represents the establishment of the Bondi Beach Parish of the Catholic Church and its importance as a place of worship for the local Catholic community through several generations.

St Anne's Church was listed on the New South Wales State Heritage Register on 26 May 2006 having satisfied the following criteria.

The place is important in demonstrating the course, or pattern, of cultural or natural history in New South Wales.

St Anne's Church is of historic significance as a sign of the early and continuing role of the Catholic Church in the growth of residential development in the Bondi Beach area from the 1920s. Together with the adjacent school buildings the Church forms a precinct that has served the spiritual and educational needs of the local Catholic community for several generations. As winner of the Sulman Award for architecture in 1935, the church also offers historical insights into questions of taste and aesthetics in Sydney in the 1930s.

The place has a strong or special association with a person, or group of persons, of importance of cultural or natural history of New South Wales's history.

St Anne's Church testifies to the vision of the founding priest of St Anne's Parish at Bondi Beach, Father Daniel O'Sullivan, who played a major role in establishing the physical fabric required to meet the community's spiritual, pastoral and educational needs. The church is also associated with Father Patrick Cunningham, parish priest from 1957 to 1979 who, early in his ministry, devoted himself to the completion of the building. The prominent Sydney architect Joseph Fowell, considered one of the key exponents of the "Interwar Romanesque" style in Australia, is also associated with the building for presiding over both stages of design and construction thirty years apart.

The place is important in demonstrating aesthetic characteristics and/or a high degree of creative or technical achievement in New South Wales.

St Anne's Church is of state aesthetic significance as a fine example of the Interwar Romanesque style of architecture. Designed by Joseph Fowell, one of the pre-eminent exponents of this style in Australia, it has been described as a 'nobly scaled design' and as "perhaps the highlight of ecclesiastical architecture in interwar Sydney". The aesthetic and technical excellence of St Anne's Shrine was recognised immediately upon completion of the first stage of construction in the form of the Royal Australian Institute of Architects' Sulman Award for 1935. It is of interest that this important award was granted to an incomplete building, recognising the quality of the overall design intention.

The dominance of brick mass to round arched windows is characteristic of the Romanesque style, which was widely adopted in Catholic churches built in Australia and elsewhere in the 1920s and 1930s, possibly to distinguish them from the Gothic Revival style then used by the Anglican Church. The Romanesque style has been described as a means by which architects of the period could "move cautiously towards the uncluttered simplicity of mass and detail favoured by the modernists". The church illustrates typical characteristics of the style including: use of piers or buttresses, large entrance arches, low pitched gabled roofs, elaborately detailed brickwork and squat massing of the architectural volumes. The size and architectural massing of the church can readily be appreciated in its open corner setting, and its relatively monumental scale makes it an important landmark in the locality. The round arched stone entrance portico to Blair Street is considered an outstanding example of stone craftsmanship. The interior detailing is richer than the exterior and skilfully executed in brick, carved stone and timber. The spatial qualities of the interior, including the open relationship between nave and aisles, and the particularly fine modelling of the sanctuary with its encircling arcaded ambulatory are of considerable aesthetic merit and capture a symbolism and spatial quality evoking the medieval origins of the style.

The place has a strong or special association with a particular community or cultural group in New South Wales for social, cultural or spiritual reasons.

St Anne's Church is of social significance for its historic role in the establishment of the Bondi Beach Parish of the Catholic church and its importance as a place of worship for the local Catholic community through several generations.

The place has potential to yield information that will contribute to an understanding of the cultural or natural history of New South Wales.

St Anne's Church is of state significance in this criterion for its architectural qualities that provide an important point of reference in the adaptation of the Romanesque style as symbolic of the meanings and functions of the Catholic Church. Its contribution to understandings of 1930s taste and aesthetics is enhanced by it being the recipient of the Sulman Award of 1935, and by it being considered a primary example of the Interwar Romanesque style.

The (currently dismantled) ventilation system using convection to circulate cool air from beneath the church through ventilation holes under the pews is an ingenious, environmentally sustainable and possibly unique system of temperature modification that is worthy of further study.

The place possesses uncommon, rare or endangered aspects of the cultural or natural history of New South Wales.

St Anne's Church contains a rare ventilation system using convection to circulate cool air from beneath the church through ventilation holes into boxes hidden under the pews (where drawstrings could be pulled to allow the air to circulate into the church). This ingenious, environmentally sustainable and possibly unique system of temperature modification has been dismantled, however all the parts are stored on site and capable of reinstatement, or study. The church more generally is of local significance for being a fine building of relatively monumental scale within the Waverley area.

The place is important in demonstrating the principal characteristics of a class of cultural or natural places/environments in New South Wales.

St Anne's Church represents a fine example of the Interwar Romanesque style of architecture, which was commonly used in the design of Catholic churches throughout New South Wales in the 1920s and 1930s. It has been described as a "nobly scaled design" and as "perhaps the highlight of ecclesiastical architecture in interwar Sydney". The church's representative significance is enhanced by its positioning as the key element in a church-school precinct of buildings.

== See also ==
- Roman Catholicism in Australia
