= David Weedon =

Australian physician

David Weedon AO (born 1941) is an Australian physician and dermatopathologist. He was born in Queensland. He received his MBBS degree in 1966 at the University of Queensland (and later the M.D.), and completed residency training in pathology at that institution and the Mayo Clinic in Rochester, MN in the U.S. Weedon has authored two notable books in the field of pathology. The first focused on diseases of the gallbladder, and the second text, on dermatopathology, is widely considered to be the most encyclopedic reference work on the histomorphology of skin diseases. It is titled Skin Pathology. Published originally in 1997 and currently in its fourth edition, now edited by James W. Patterson, that book is extensively referenced. It combines information on classical and rare clinical presentations of cutaneous disorders, providing detailed descriptions of their histopathologic characteristics. Weedon has published over 120 original papers in the medical literature.

Weedon is a professor of pathology at Bond University, Queensland, where he was awarded the Student Council Award for Academic Excellence. He is a member of the Australian National Health and Medical Research Committee, and was a founding member of the Australasian Dermatopathology Society.

From 1995 to 1997, Weedon was the President of the Australian Medical Association (AMA). He has also served as a member of that organization's professional standards review panel, and he was President of the Royal College of Pathologists of Australasia from 2001 to 2003.

In 1997, Weedon was appointed an Officer of the Order of Australia for service to medicine, particularly in the fields of education, pathology and dermatopathology.
