= Steve Hambleton =

- Born: 14 January 1961 (age 65); Brisbane, Australia
- Education: University of Queensland
- Occupation: General practitioner
- Years active: 1987–present
- Known for: Former president of the Australian Medical Association
- Spouse: Deborah Hambleton
- Children: 4

Steven Jon Hambleton (born 14 January 1961) is a Queensland GP and former federal president of the Australian Medical Association.

== Early life ==
=== Education ===
Steve Hambleton attended St Joseph's College, Gregory Terrace from 1969 to 1978. Hambleton studied a Bachelor of Medicine, Bachelor of Surgery at the University of Queensland from 1979 to 1984.

== Professional career ==
=== Australian Medical Association Federal Presidency ===
Hambleton served as president of the Australian Medical Association for three years from his unopposed election in June 2011 to May 2014.

=== AMAQ Foundation ===
Hambleton is the Foundation President of the AMAQ Foundation, the charity arm of the AMAQ.
