= Electricity Substation No. 269 =

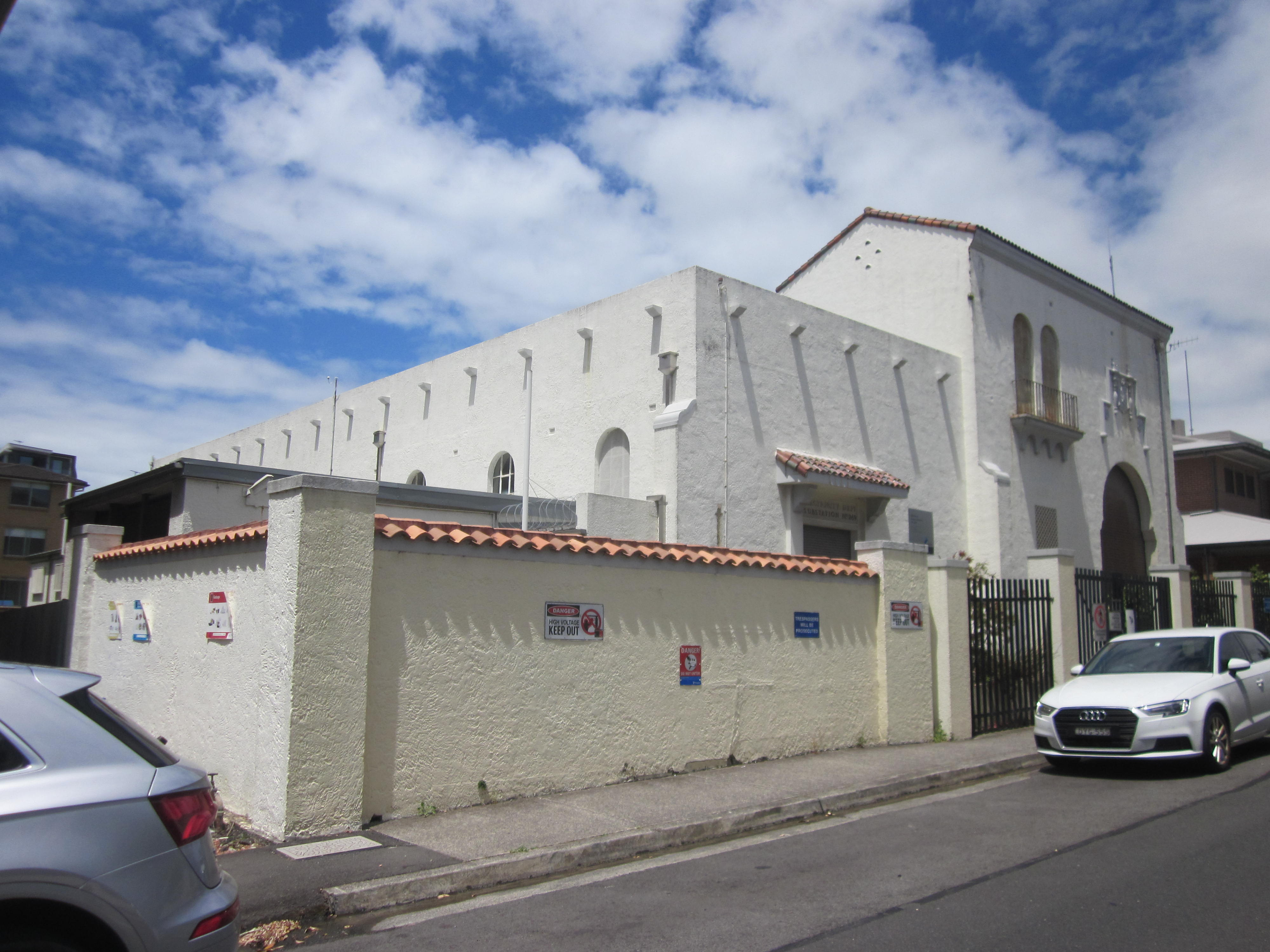
- Electricity Substation No. 269 at 36 Anglesea Street, Bondi, New South Wales

- Location within east Sydney Location within Australia
- 33°53′29″S 151°15′38″E
- Location: 36 Anglesea Street, Bondi, New South Wales, Australia

History
- Built: 1928

Site notes
- Architect(s): Walter Frederick White; City Architect's Office; Municipal Council of Sydney
- Owner: Ausgrid

New South Wales Heritage Register
- Official name: Electricity Substation No. 269; #269 'WAVERLEY' 33KV ZONE; 'ELECTRICITY DEPT SUBSTATION No. 269'; Angelsea Sub Station; Waverley Zone Substation
- Type: state heritage (built)
- Designated: 2 May 2008
- Reference no.: 1791
- Type: Electricity Transformer/Substation
- Category: Utilities – Electricity
- Builders: Municipal Council of Sydney

Electricity Substation No. 269 is a heritage-listed electrical substation located at 36 Anglesea Street, Bondi, New South Wales, Australia. It was designed by Walter Frederick White, City Architect's Office and Municipal Council of Sydney and built in 1928 by the Municipal Council of Sydney. The property is owned by Ausgrid. It was added to the New South Wales State Heritage Register on 2 May 2008.

== History ==
Waverley Zone Substation No. 269 is a purpose designed and built structure dating from 1928 that was constructed as a major component of the electricity distribution network of Sydney. From the late 1920s, there was an enormous expansion in electricity provision within the Sydney region, driven by the suburban growth of the 1920s and 1930s. Under this impetus, dozens of electricity substations were built annually to service demand. Waverley Zone Substation No. 269 was constructed by the Municipal Council of Sydney as a zone substation to supply high voltage power (33 kV) to the substations of the rapidly developing Bondi area. The zone substation remains in service for its original purpose.

=== Electricity provision in Sydney, 1904 to present ===
In 1904, the year in which the first power station in Sydney commenced operations, the Municipal Council of Sydney (MCS) was formed to produce and distribute electric light and power to central Sydney. From 1904 until 1935 the MCS, as both an electricity generation and distribution authority, constructed hundreds of small distribution substations throughout Sydney, many of which are still in service. The MCS supplied electricity to retail customers around the inner city, inner west and lower north shore and provided bulk power to outer western and northern suburbs such as Penrith, Hornsby and Manly.

The MCS initially competed against a number of private electricity supply companies. These were mostly small-scale operations that the MCS had acquired by 1914. The exception was the Electric Light and Power Supply Corporation (ELPSC), established in 1909, which was the one major private player in the Sydney electricity market until 1955 when it was nationalised by the Electricity Commission of NSW. In 1935 the functions of the MCS Electricity Department were taken over by the Sydney County Council (SCC) with broad responsibility for electricity supply across the Sydney region. There was rapid expansion in the electricity distribution network with 40–50 substations constructed annually. The scale of SCC's operations consistently made it the largest local authority in Australia throughout the second half of the 20th century. In 1991, the SCC was reconstituted as Sydney Electricity, a statutory authority. In 1996 Sydney Electricity merged with the Hunter regional electricity authority Orion (formerly Shortland Electricity) and was corporatised as EnergyAustralia. The distribution business of EnergyAustralia was renamed Ausgrid.

=== Substation design, 1904 to present ===
Electricity distribution substations were generally built as modest 1 or 2 storey buildings, with Zone Substations considerably larger in scale. The style and nature of substation construction became progressively more standardised as the electricity network expanded. While the earliest substations tended to be large, well-ornamented public buildings, as they became more commonplace, substations became smaller and simpler. This reflected the need for cost-effective construction methods, the reduction in size of electrical equipment and the speed with which substations needed to be constructed to keep pace with demand.

While early substations were often purpose-designed and built for a specific location, by the late 1920s the trend was for standardised designs built to a similar size and generally designed to fit on a standard suburban subdivision block, typically 100–200 square metres (1,100–2,200 sq ft).

Designs did keep pace with architectural trends and it is possible to identify a number of different and distinct architectural styles of substations. One-off designed substations did continue to be built well into the mid-20th century thought these tended to be restricted to what the SCC referred to as "high class" suburbs in Sydney's east.The number of substations constructed in the Sydney region exploded from the late 1920s, with dozens of substations being constructed in any one year to cope with expanding demand. While in the early years of network construction many substations had unique characteristics and were sited in response to a particular need, from the late 1920s standardised designs were generally used and expansion was based on a need to establish and expand the electricity grid rather than in response to localised or site-specific issues.

By the 1950s the trend towards architecturally designed and detailed substations was exhausted. From that point on, the freestanding metal kiosk-style substation was progressively introduced, while buildings, where they were constructed, tended towards strictly functional unadorned brick enclosures. Substation design was also influenced by the general changes in Australian building construction in the mid-20th century. The trend towards larger steel and concrete buildings saw "chamber"" style substations incorporated directly within new buildings. In such circumstances the electricity provider had little or no input into the architectural style of the substation chamber, merely supplying technical requirements which influenced the location and size of the substation within the new building. This trend also saw smaller older-style substations demolished in some areas and replaced with new chamber substations incorporated into a new development. This style of construction is commonplace today, particularly in high density urban areas.

EnergyAustralia's older substations range from very finely detailed to very plain and functional. The early government-run electrical authorities were aware of the need to make substations in residential areas attractive and in keeping with the surroundings, and an architect joined the substation design area of Sydney County Council in 1936. By contrast, the modern trend is to make substations essentially invisible, through incorporating them into larger buildings, placing them wholly underground or within anonymous small steel boxes which tend to be ignored in urban environments. The exception to this continues to be the zone substations and high voltage switchyards, which continue to require large buildings or areas of land to house equipment.

Historically, better quality buildings tended to be reserved for what the MCS referred to as "high class" suburbs (particularly Woollahra and Mosman) while middle- and working-class suburbs generally received much simpler, functional buildings. Designs tended to be reused, sometimes with only minimal variation. There are also marked stylistic differences between substations constructed by government as opposed to those constructed by the Electric Light and Power Supply Corporation (ELPSC) throughout the first half of the 20th century. The ELPSC substations tend to be functionalist brick boxes with only the slightest degree of architectural detailing or ornamentation, whereas the substations constructed by municipalities, while often reusing the same underlying design with minor variation, tend to be more finely detailed and in many instances are designed to match the architecture of the surrounding area. This may reflect the different nature of the competing priorities of a private as opposed to a government enterprise. A number of former ELPSC structures exist within the EnergyAustralia network.

== Description ==
The Waverley Zone substation is a large cement rendered building comprising a two-storey gable roofed structure with an abutting single storey section. Designed in the Interwar Mediterranean style, with elements of Spanish Mission style, stylistic elements include a stylised balcony with arch motif brackets, a curved tile ventilation panel, and decorative projecting rendered roof joists. The Waverley Zone substation is constructed with load bearing brickwork faced with cement render. It features rounded roof tiles, multi-paned windows and a large steel roller shutter entrance door (a later replacement of the original roller door).

=== Condition ===
There is a large crack to front boundary masonry wall. Some areas of building require painting. Evidence of weather penetration and minor damage to roof tiles. The substation is intact.

=== Modifications and dates ===
Gutters and downpipes have been replaced in correct profile. Doors and chain wire fences have been replaced.

== Heritage listing ==
As at 25 October 2007, Waverley Zone Substation No 269 is significant at state level as an exceptionally large and finely detailed example of a Mediterranean style substation with elements of Spanish Mission style. It was designed by the City Architect's Office of the Municipal Council of Sydney and built in 1928.

It is the largest of this style of substation and is the only zone substation to be designed in this style, (as distinct from the smaller local distribution substations of which five share a similar architectural style). Its important architectural values demonstrate the Municipal Council of Sydney's policy of designing attractive utilitarian buildings that would complement the prevailing architectural style of the surrounding area.

Waverley Zone Substation No 269 is significant at state level as a key component of electrical infrastructure for this area of the city and demonstrates a significant phase of expansion of electricity provision to Sydney's suburbs. The zone substation, which supplied bulk high voltage power to the distribution substations, was constructed in response to the strong residential growth in the surrounding suburbs in the 1920s and 1930s.

Waverley Zone Substation No 269 remains in service for its original purpose.

Electricity Substation No. 269 was listed on the New South Wales State Heritage Register on 2 May 2008 having satisfied the following criteria.

The place is important in demonstrating the course, or pattern, of cultural or natural history in New South Wales.

Waverley Zone Substation No. 269 is significant at state level both for its association with a significant historical phase, in the major expansion of electricity provision to Sydney's rapidly developing eastern suburbs in the 1920s and 1930s, and in demonstrating the continuity of historical activity in the provision of electricity. Electricity Zone Substations are the critical backbone of the electricity network and serve as the points where the high voltage power supplied from the generation system is received and transformed for distribution to the network of small distribution substations and thence to customers. Waverley Zone Substation No. 269 is historically important as a key component of the electricity distribution network which delivered high voltage power to the Bondi area and which underpinned the local electricity distribution system. The zone substation continues to serve its original function as an item of critical infrastructure within Sydney's electricity network (2007).

The place has a strong or special association with a person, or group of persons, of importance of cultural or natural history of New South Wales's history.

Waverley Zone Substation No. 269 is significant at state level for its association with the work of Walter Frederick White (ARIA) between c.1924 and 1947 at the City Architect's Office, Municipal Council of Sydney and its successor organisation, Sydney County Council. White is known to have been responsible for the substantial and sympathetic 1929 extensions to the Interwar Art Nouveau/Art Deco styled Auburn Zone Substation No. 167 and for the design of the distribution substation No. 349, Randwick (1930) which is an exceptionally attractive structure in the Interwar Mediterranean/Spanish Mission styles. Further research should reveal additional surviving substations built by the Municipal Council of Sydney and Sydney County Council that can be attributed to WF White.

The place is important in demonstrating aesthetic characteristics and/or a high degree of creative or technical achievement in New South Wales.

Waverley Zone Substation No. 269 is significant at state level for its size and style. It is a substantial, externally intact example of a zone substation in the Interwar Mediterranean/Spanish Mission styles and is the only zone substation built by the Municipal Council of Sydney in this style. It is similar in design to the more detailed and intact, but smaller distribution substation No. 349. Both substations were designed by the Municipal Council of Sydney in the Mediterranean/Spanish Mission style as prestige structures to complement the building stock of Sydney's eastern suburbs. The high standard of the Municipal Council of Sydney's electricity substation design of the 1920s and 1930s demonstrates its express policy of constructing finely designed buildings in areas it considered to be "high class" suburbs.

The place has a strong or special association with a particular community or cultural group in New South Wales for social, cultural or spiritual reasons.

The site does not meet this criterion

The place has potential to yield information that will contribute to an understanding of the cultural or natural history of New South Wales.

The site does not meet this criterion. While it continues its original function, its internal equipment has been modified many times over the life of the site.

The place possesses uncommon, rare or endangered aspects of the cultural or natural history of New South Wales.

Waverley Zone Substation No. 269 is significant at state level as the only zone substation built in the Interwar Mediterranean/Spanish Mission styles. It shares stylistic similarities with the following four smaller distribution substations (all in Sydney's eastern suburbs) that were built by the Municipal Council of Sydney (MCS) or Sydney County Council (SCC) between 1929 and 1939:

- No. 300, Clovelly (c. 1929, Interwar Spanish Mission, MCS)
- No. 314, Vaucluse (1930, Interwar Mediterranean, MCS)
- No. 364, Bellevue Hill (1931, Interwar Mediterranean, MCS)
- No. 592, Watsons Bay (1939, Interwar Mediterranean, SCC).

All four above substations are assessed on EnergyAustralia's section 170 Heritage and Conservation Register 2007 as having local significance. These are all considerably smaller, and some are less detailed, structures than Waverley Zone Substation No. 269.

The place is important in demonstrating the principal characteristics of a class of cultural or natural places/environments in New South Wales.

Waverley Zone Substation No. 269 is significant at state level as typical in form, scale and technical details to other zone substations. It is the only zone substation to have been designed in the Interwar Mediterranean/Spanish Mission styles.
