= AMA House, Sydney =

Heritage-listed building in Sydney, Australia

AMA House
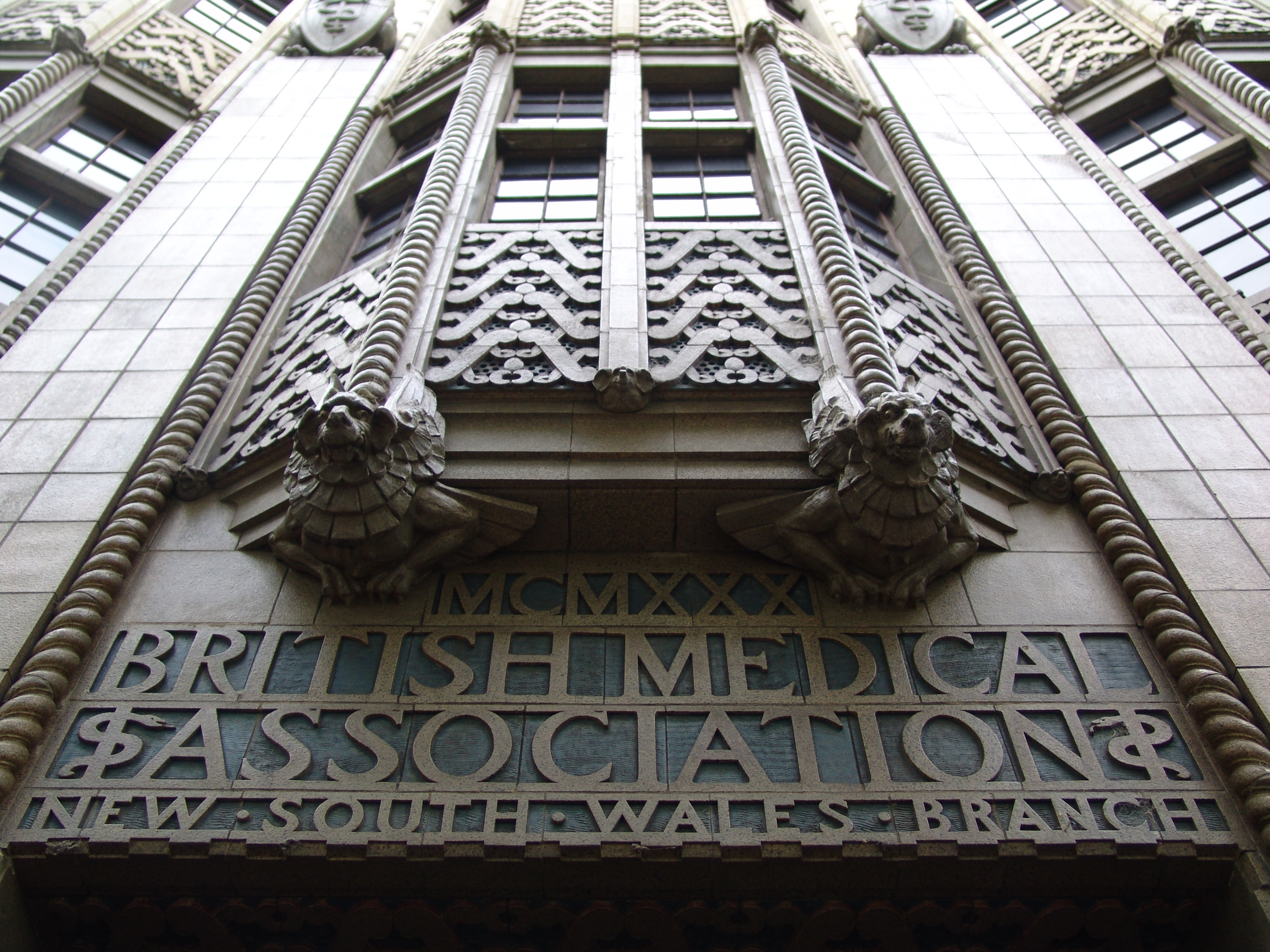
- The façade of the AMA House building, pictured in 2007

- Location within Sydney Location within Australia
- 33.8643°S 151.2124°E
- Location: 135–137 Macquarie Street, Sydney, New South Wales, Australia

History
- Built: 1929–1930

Site notes
- Architect(s): Fowell & McConnel
- Architectural style: Inter-war Art Deco
- Owner: Strata Plan No.14172

New South Wales Heritage Register
- Official name: BMA House; AMA House; Australian Medical Association House
- Type: State heritage (built)
- Designated: 2 April 1999
- Reference no.: 252
- Type: Commercial Office/Building
- Category: Commercial
- Builders: Messrs Hutcherson Bros

AMA House, Sydney or the Australian Medical Association House, Sydney is a heritage-listed former medical office and library and now commercial offices located at 135–137 Macquarie Street in the Sydney central business district, in the City of Sydney local government area of New South Wales, Australia. It was designed by Fowell & McConnel and built from 1929 to 1930 by Messrs Hutcherson Bros. It was formerly known as BMA House or the British Medical Association House. The property is privately owned. It was added to the New South Wales State Heritage Register on 2 April 1999.

== History ==
The British Medical Association, founded in England in 1832 to promote both the study of medicine and protection of the medical profession, established branches in three Australian states in 1879–80. The New South Wales branch, under its founding president, the highly distinguished Sir Arthur Renwick, grew from small beginnings in 1880 to be the largest in Australia. This BMA branch replaced the earlier Australian Medical Association formed in Sydney by Dr William Bland in 1859.

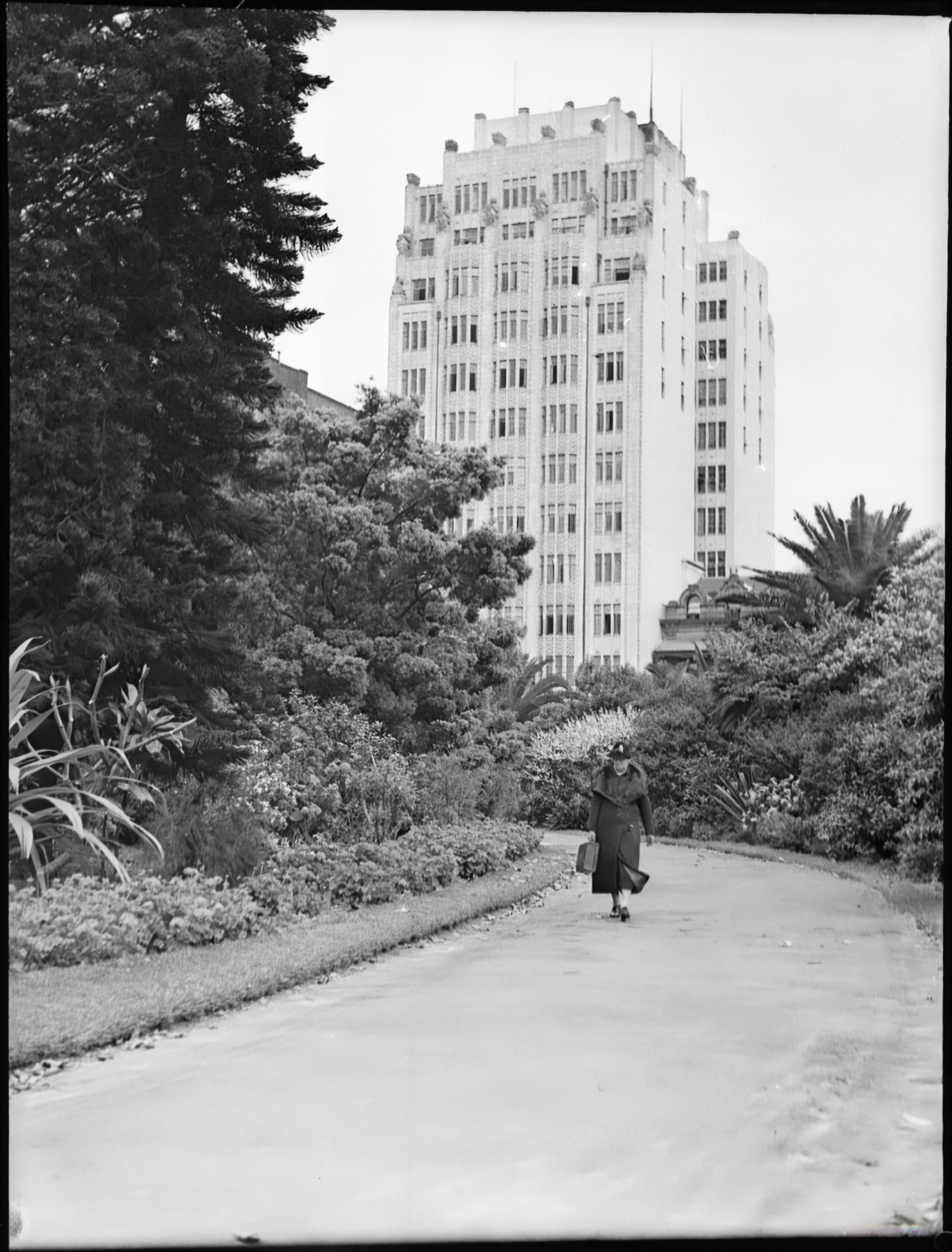
Australian Medical Association House, Macquarie Street, Sydney, 1938

The BMA flourished in New South Wales during the 23 years, 1908 to 1931, when its secretary was Dr Robert Todd, a prominent physician, barrister, clarinettist, university lecturer and medical administrator. Todd was largely responsible for the acquisition of lots 17 and 18 in Macquarie Street in the 1920s. This area of the city had been in the grounds of First Government House, demolished in 1845-6 and its land sub-divided after 1847. Lot 18 had been first purchased along with the adjacent lot 19 (the site of History House) by a speculative J. N. Palmer in 1849: lot 19 had been owned by Dr Bland in the 1850s and its neighbouring lots were some seventy years later acquired by the successor association to Bland's. The substantial Victorian houses on lots 17 and 18, Nos. 137 and 135 Macquarie Street, were demolished in 1929 and the BMA commissioned the winners of a vigorous competition, Fowell and McConnel, and their contractors, Hutcherson Bros, to erect a prestigious high-rise building on the double site.

The new building was completed in April 1930, acclaimed, along with Grace Bros' new store in King Street, as "the first two local examples that can be said to really follow the dictates of skyscraper and modern American architecture generally". Its qualities of design were recognised when in 1933 its architects were the first recipients of the Royal Institute of British Architects Street medal and diploma.

The faience terracotta panelling of the exterior by Wunderlich was matched in the principal public interior spaces and the six full-size medieval knights in armour along with two koalas perched high on the facade were manufactured by the same firm. The spectacular assembly hall was panelled with Queensland maple and with Colotex, which was affixed to battens on the concrete walls to give the best acoustics and insulation. Dr Todd died just a year after the building was completed and the hall became the Robert H. Todd Assembly Hall.

The offices and library of the BMA were on the first floor, the offices in room 101 now occupied by Dr Duke, the library in room 104 with the sign of Aesculapius guarding the entrance still.

In 1972 the BMA became the Australian Medical Association and in the 1980s the new body moved to a new AMA House in St Leonards. The original building is now entirely leased to professional people, mainly doctors and dentists.

== Description ==
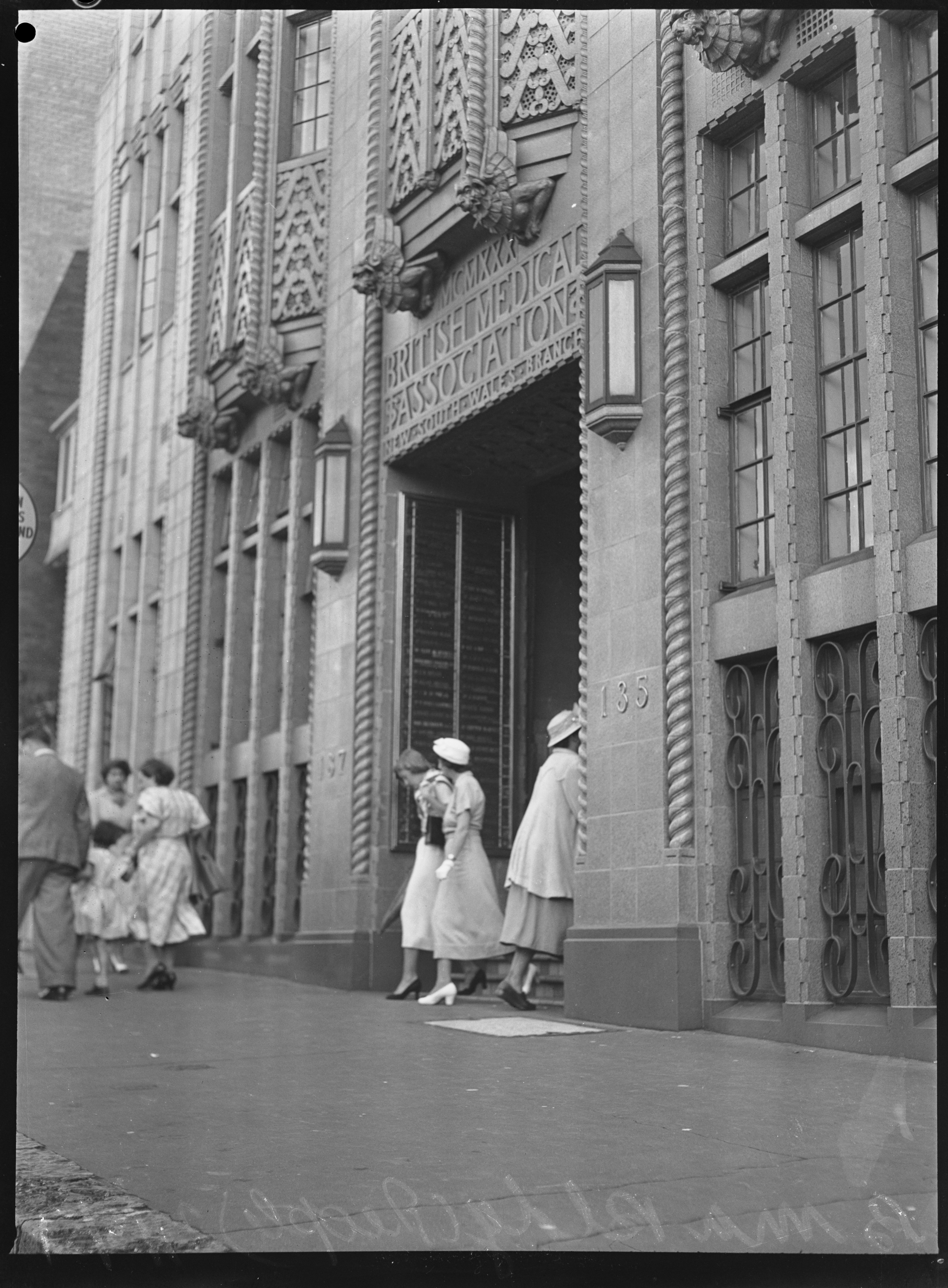
Australian Medical Association House, Macquarie Street, Sydney, 1951

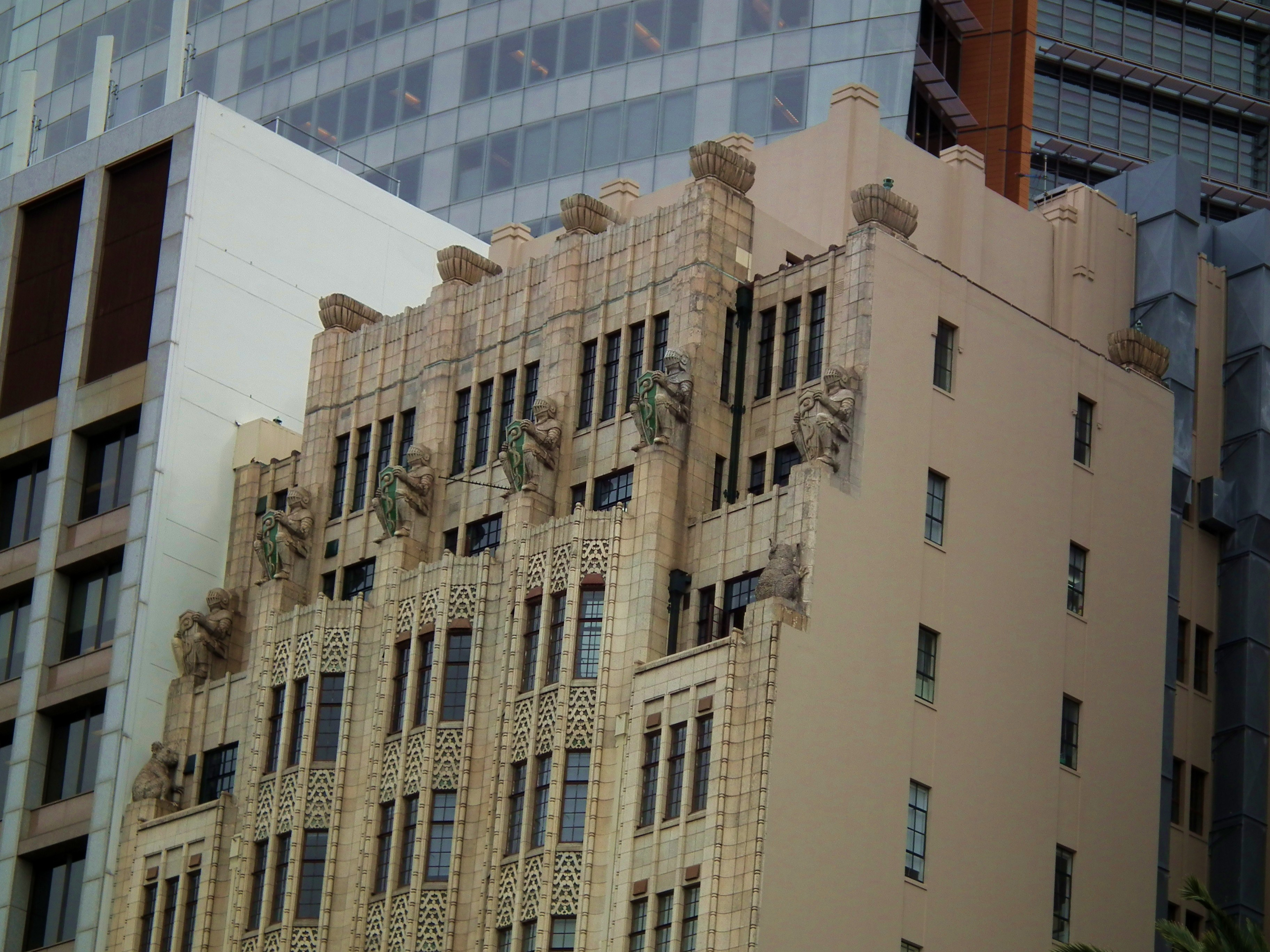
The upper exterior façade of the AMA House, showing koalas, pictured in 2012

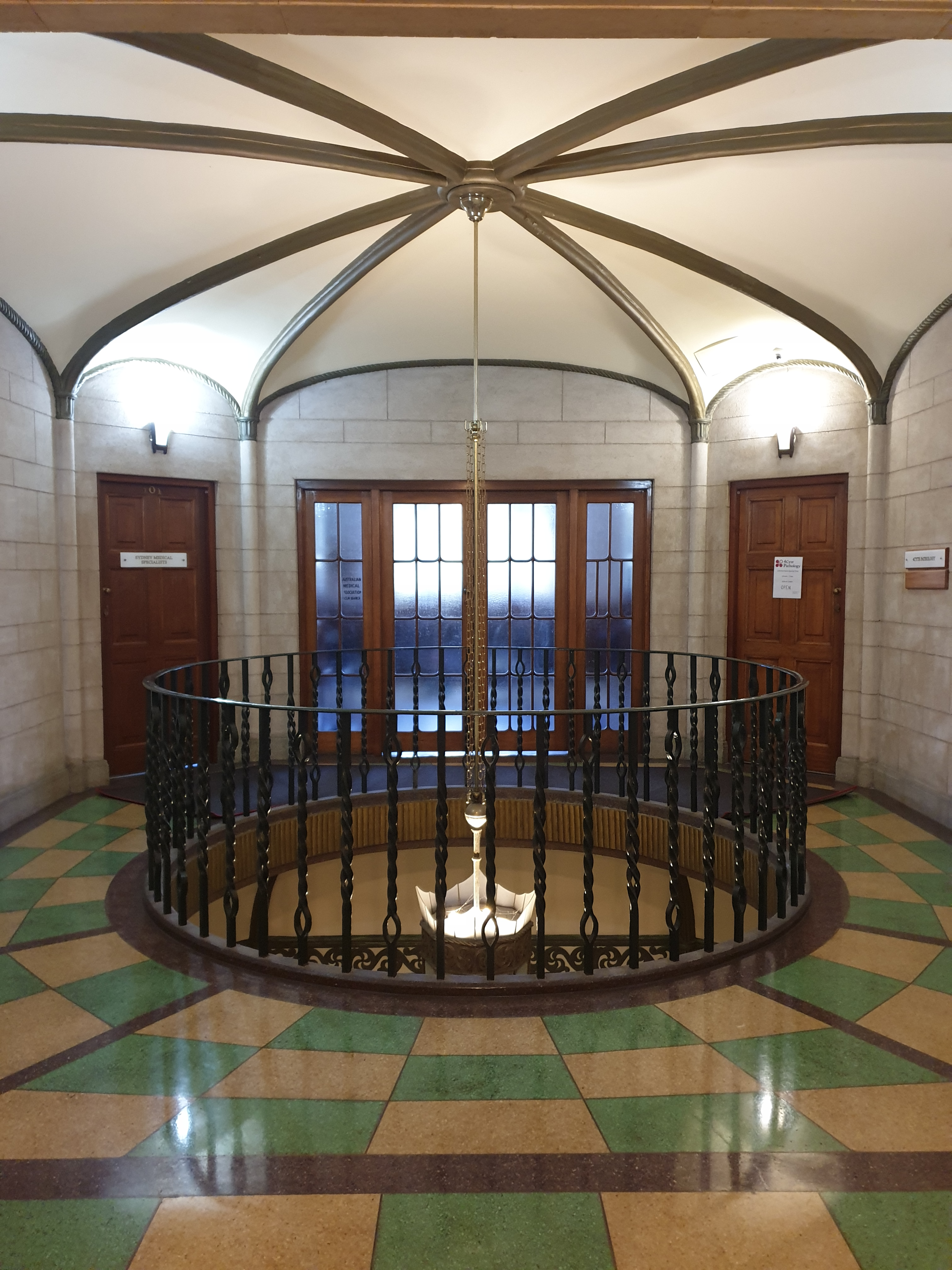
Interior of AMA House

Glazed terracotta tiles; steel frame windows Glazed terracotta tiles; rendered masonry; steel frame windows.

=== Condition ===
As at 1 November 2006, refer to Archaeological Zoning Plan. Mechanical Engineers for original building were Watson & White. The terracotta faience was manufactured locally by Wunderlich. The building won the RIBA Award for Street Architecture in 1935 and RIBA Bronze Medal.

== Heritage listing ==
The AMA House has high aesthetic significance as a particularly fine and rare example of early Sydney "skyscraper" designed in an exuberant and idiosyncratic Inter-war Art Deco style embellished with "Medieval" and "Gothic" decoration. While providing important evidence of the strong influence of American styles and building techniques on Sydney's interwar commercial buildings, AMA House is notable for its use of both local materials and technologies, including particularly the faience cladding by Wunderlich and maple joiner, and its flamboyant incorporation of Australian iconography, including particularly the Koala bears at the top of the front facade. The quality of original finishes and detailing both externally and internally and the high degree of intactness of significant original fabric enhance the building's architectural and aesthetic significance.

The building is also of importance as a fine, award-winning example of the work of a prominent firm of Sydney architects, Fowell and McConnel was one of only two office buildings designed by this firm in the Interwar period.

BMA House also has important historical associations with the medical profession in NSW generally and their professional organisation, the AMA in particular, these associations still retained in the building's name, various plaques, the decorative iconography and particular rooms such as the Robert H. Todd Assembly Hall and the former AMA offices. The building's location in Macquarie Street further enhances these associations, the building be one of the few and certainly the most obvious reminder of the former "medical precinct" character of Macquarie Street.

The building's technical significance arises primarily from its generous and varied use of new materials, detailing and technologies characteristic of the new commercial "skyscrapers" of the Interwar period and the high degree of intactness of these elements. The building is also a rare example of an Interwar building which incorporated squash courts at roof level.

BMA House was listed on the New South Wales State Heritage Register on 2 April 1999 having satisfied the following criteria.

The place is important in demonstrating the course, or pattern, of cultural or natural history in New South Wales.

AMA House also has important historical associations with the medical profession in NSW generally and their professional organisation, the AMA in particular, these associations still retained in the building's name, various plaques, the decorative iconography and particular rooms such as the Robert H. Todd Assembly Hall and the former AMA offices. The building's location in Macquarie Street further enhances these associations, the building be one of the few and certainly the most obvious reminder of the former "medical precinct" character of Macquarie Street. Has historic significance at a State level.

The place is important in demonstrating aesthetic characteristics and/or a high degree of creative or technical achievement in New South Wales.

AMA House has high aesthetic significance as a particularly fine and rare example of early Sydney "skyscraper" designed in an exuberant and idiosyncratic Art Deco style embellished with "Medieval" and "Gothic" decoration. While providing important evidence of the strong influence of American styles and building techniques on Sydney's interwar commercial buildings, AMA House is notable for its use of both local materials and technologies including particularly the faience cladding by Wunderlich and maple joinery and its flamboyant incorporation of Australian iconography including particularly the Koala bears at the top of the front facade. The quality of original finishes and detailing both externally and internally and the high degree of intactness of significant original fabric enhance the building's architectural and aesthetic significance. The building is also of importance as a fine, award-winning example of the work of a prominent firm of Sydney architects, Fowell and McConnel and was one of only two office buildings designed by this firm in the Interwar period. The building's technical significance arises primarily from its generous and varied use of new materials, detailing and technologies characteristic of the new commercial "skyscrapers" of the Interwar period and the high degree of intactness of these elements. The perforations in the spandrel panels, highlighted by decorative faience work - are also unusual innovations to improve air circulation (prior to air conditioning). The site also provides a rare example of an Interwar building which incorporated squash courts at roof level when first constructed. Has aesthetic significance at a State level.

The place possesses uncommon, rare or endangered aspects of the cultural or natural history of New South Wales.

The building is a rare example of so highly and idiosyncratically decorated an Art Deco "skyscraper" from the Interwar period and is unique in its exuberant use of Australian iconography on the main facade. Is rare at a State level.

The place is important in demonstrating the principal characteristics of a class of cultural or natural places/environments in New South Wales.

AMA House is a fine representative example of many of the architectural elements, construction techniques and materials used in Interwar commercial high-rise building design and the influence of American models on these. Is representative at a State level

== See also ==
- Australian Medical Association
- Joseph Charles Fowell
