= Michael Gannon (obstetrician) =

Michael Gannon is a Western Australian obstetrician and gynaecologist. Dr Michael Gannon is a former president of the Australian Medical Association (AMA) 2016–2018 and AMA (WA) 2014–2016.

Under Dr. Gannon's leadership, the AMA recommended a precautionary principle on access to e-cigarettes, pointing to existing evidence on the harms of vaping.
