= Australian Medical Association =

Australian professional association

- Type: Professional association
- Founded: 1962; 64 years ago
- Area served: Australia
- Key people: Dr Danielle McMullen (president); Dr Julian Rait (vice president)
- Revenue: ▼ A$22.0 million (2023)
- Total assets: ▼ A$41.6 million (2023)
- Subsidiaries: Australasian Medical Publishing Company; Drs4Drs
- Website: ama.com.au

The Australian Medical Association (AMA) is an independent professional association for Australian doctors and medical students. The association is not a government authority and does not regulate or certify doctors, a responsibility which lies with the Australian Health Practitioner Regulation Agency. The association's national headquarters are located in Barton, Australian Capital Territory, in addition to the offices of its branches in each of the states and territories in Australia.

The organisation aims to lead health policy debate. It is based on a structure of state branches and committees. The AMA advocates to promote and protect the interests of doctors in Australia, and medical patient care. It has around 30,000 members forming the largest voluntary association of doctors in Australia. The AMA has traditionally been a politically conservative body, although the AMA officially endorses trials to use pill testing.

The AMA offers an Indigenous Medical Scholarship. It has formed an Equity, Inclusion and Diversity Committee. The current president is Dr Danielle McMullen. The BMA Branches of the Australian states and territories formally merged into the Australian Medical Association in 1962.

== Aims and objectives ==
The AMA has a range of representative and scientific committees. One of its stated aims is "leading the health policy debate by developing and promoting alternative policies to those government policies that the AMA considers poorly targeted or ill-informed; responding to issues in the health debate through the provision of a wide range of expert resources; and commissioning and conducting research on health issues."

== Membership and demographics ==
The AMA represents slightly fewer than 30% of all Australian doctors, which is the largest voluntary association of doctors in Australia. This is down from previous levels of 95% in 1962 and 50% in 1987. The rate of membership amongst Australian GPs is lower than for other doctors, with approximately 6,000 out of 45,000 GPs being AMA members. Engagement of GPs by the AMA is lower than for the RACGP and ACRRM. In 2020, the incoming AMA President Omar Khorshid claimed in an interview that the AMA could still advocate on behalf of all doctors, even though only 30% of doctors supported the AMA through membership.

There are 15 officially recognised specialty medical Colleges in Australia. The AMA offers only the 11 largest out of the 15 representation on AMA Federal Council with the smaller Colleges currently ineligible for representation. The official Australian medical colleges that do not have representation within the AMA are Australasian College of Sport and Exercise Physicians, Australian College of Rural and Remote Medicine, College of Intensive Care Medicine and the Royal Australasian College of Medical Administrators. Other specialties that are sub-groups within a specialist college, however, do have voting representation on AMA Federal council, such as Orthopaedics and Paediatrics. Voting in the AMA is primarily through representation on Federal council so that unrepresented specialties do not get voting rights and ordinary members are only allowed to vote through their representatives.

The AMA offers an Indigenous Medical Scholarship. It has called upon the Federal government to spend more on Indigenous Health in a number of areas. However, the AMA lobbied against equitable time-tiered Medicare consultation rebates for different specialists, which was proposed by the MBS Review Taskforce. Inability to access equitable time-tiered MBS rebates for Sport & Exercise Medicine specialists under Medicare was an important issue for Indigenous Australians. In 2020, the AMA President Tony Bartone criticised attendees at the Black Lives Matter rallies in Australia during the COVID-19 pandemic for attending a large gathering, although AMA (WA) President Andrew Miller was supportive.

The AMA formed an Equity, Inclusion and Diversity Committee (EIDC) in 2016, which produced an anti-racism statement in 2018. The AMA held a Gender Equity Summit in 2019 and set targets to improve female representation on AMA Boards and Committees, aiming for >=40%. The AMA has only had three female Presidents in its history. In early 2020, less than 20% of members on AMA Federal Council were female. By 2026 this has increased to 35%. In 2017, 42% of doctors were female in Australia, although females only make up 36% of medical specialists.

The last 10 Presidents of the AMA have included five General Practitioners, 3 Obstetrician/Gynaecologists and 2 surgeons.

== History ==
=== Colonial medical associations ===
==== New South Wales ====
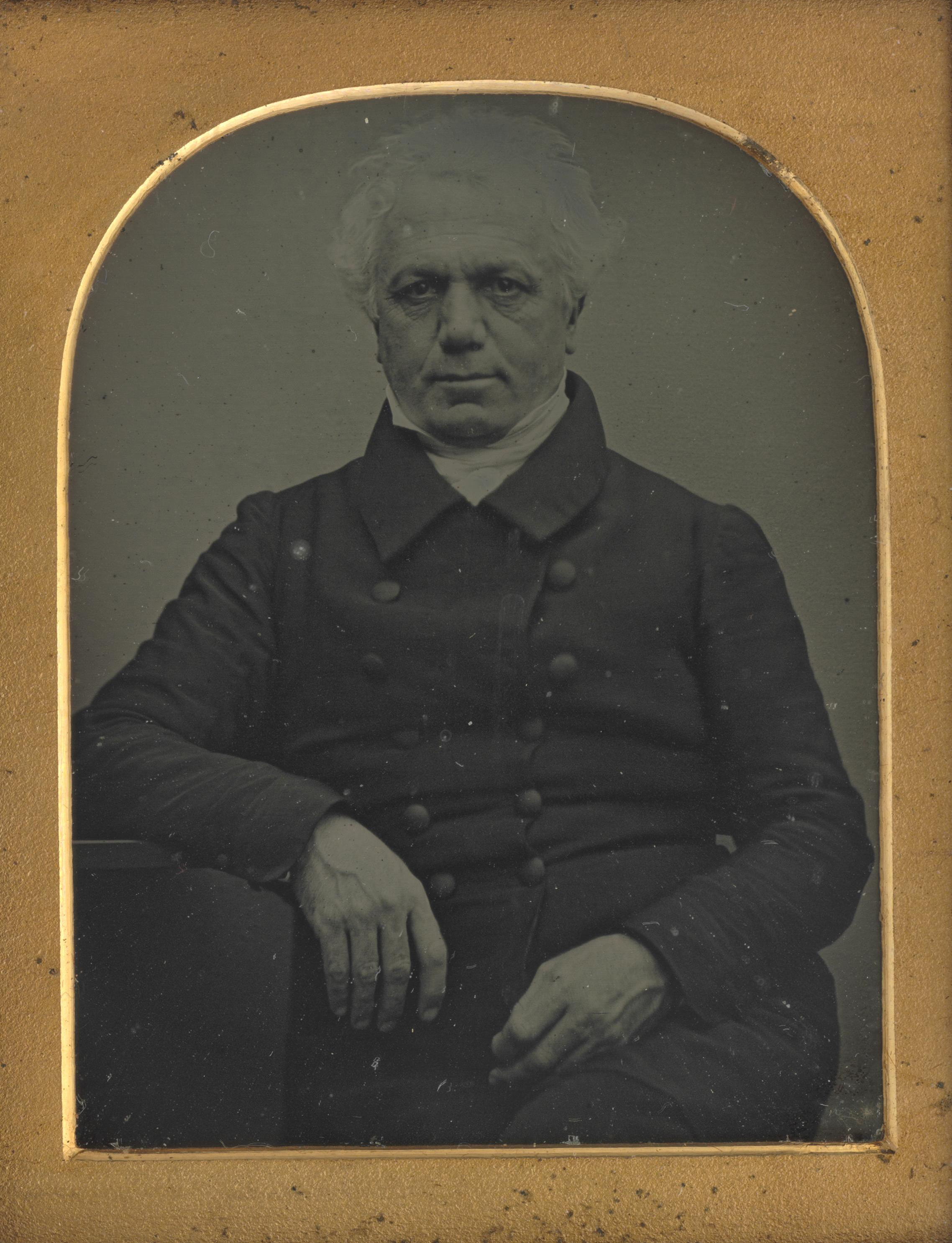
Surgeon William Bland, inaugural president of the short-lived Australian Medical Association established in 1858

The Medico-Chirurgical Association of Australia was formed in 1844 aiming to "maintain and secure the dignity and the privileges of the medical and surgical profession in this colony". Prominent surgeon and former convict William Bland was a founding member, but the organisation was short-lived. In 1850, Irish-trained physician Henry Douglass revived the Australian Philosophical Society (later the Royal Society of New South Wales), which included Charles Nicholson and a number of other doctors as members.

In 1858, English-trained physician James Robertson established a body called the Australian Medical Association (AMA), whose members were primarily from Sydney but also included some Queenslanders. Bland was elected as the organisation's president and it recorded over 110 members in its early years. However, it did not survive Robertson and Bland's subsequent deaths and was wound up in 1869.

Following the demise of the original AMA, unsuccessful attempts at revival were made by Frederick Milford and Charles Nathan. In 1876, Nicholson established a medical section of the Royal Society with the aid of Normand MacLaurin and Philip Sydney Jones. A New South Wales branch of the BMA was established in 1880, receiving official recognition on the same date as the South Australian branch.

==== Queensland ====
The Queensland Medical Society was established in 1871 with Kearsay Cannan as president and Joseph Bancroft as secretary. Following conflict between members, it was replaced by the Medical Society of Queensland (MSQ) in 1882 with Kevin Izod O'Doherty as inaugural president, later replaced by Bancroft. The society was complemented by the Queensland Medico-Ethical Association led by surgeon John Thomson. After Bancroft's death in 1894, Queensland followed the other colonies in establishing a branch of the BMA, with ophthalmologist William Frederick Taylor as inaugural branch president.

==== South Australia ====
The South Australian Medical Association was established in 1872 with surgeon William Gosse as president, but it was wound up in 1881. Many physicians were also prominent in the Royal Society of South Australia, including Joseph Verco, George Mayo and Edward Charles Stirling. South Australia was the first colony to establish a branch of the British Medical Association, doing so in 1879 with Gosse as president and Thomas Wilson Corbin as secretary. The South Australian branch of the BMA proved to be the most active in Australia, lobbying for the creation of a medical school at the University of Adelaide, organising the first Intercolonial Medical Congress in 1887, and encouraging other colonies to also affiliate with the BMA.

==== Tasmania ====
Several physicians were prominent in the Royal Society of Tasmania, established in 1843, including state premiers James Agnew and William Crowther. However, it was not until 1896 that Agnew established a medical section of the Royal Society, which functioned as the main medical organisation in Tasmania for 15 years. Attempts to establish a branch of the BMA were made as early as the 1880s, driven by Victorian-trained doctors. In 1897 a sub-branch of the Victorian BMA was formed in Launceston, which lasted until 1904. A Tasmanian branch of the BMA was eventually established in 1911, but was marked by conflict between groups from Launceston and Hobart. The branch was split into northern and southern sections in 1925.

==== Victoria ====
The Port Phillip Medical Association was established in 1846 with a membership drawn from the Port Phillip District of New South Wales. It was disbanded in 1851, the same year that the district became the separate colony of Victoria, but the following year was replaced by a new Victorian Medical Association (VMA) with David Elliot Wilkie as president. A rival Medical-Chirurgical Association of Victoria (MCA) was established in 1853 by William McCrea, joined by a number of independent bodies in gold rush districts such as Castlemaine, Mount Alexander, Bendigo and Ballarat.

The VMA and MCA merged in 1855 to form the Medical Society of Victoria (MSV). With James Edward Neild as honorary secretary, the MSV established a medical library and began publishing the Australian Medical Journal. However, it suffered from a series of internal conflicts between members and in 1868 was joined by a rival Medical Association of Victoria (MAV), publishing an alternative Australian Medical Gazette. In 1879, Neild resigned from the MSV over its failure to support him in a lawsuit and led moves to establish Victorian branch of the BMA, with surgeon William Gilbee as president. The MSV and BMA alternated between periods of enmity and cooperation until 1906, when they formally merged. Surgeon George Adlington Syme and Harry Brookes Allen were prominent supporters of the merger.

==== Western Australia ====
Due to its small population and distance from the other colonies, no serious attempts to establish a medical association in Western Australia were made until the 1880s. The Western Australian Medical Association was established in 1897, but lasted less than a year before a local branch of the BMA was set up with Alfred Waylen as inaugural president.

=== Later history ===
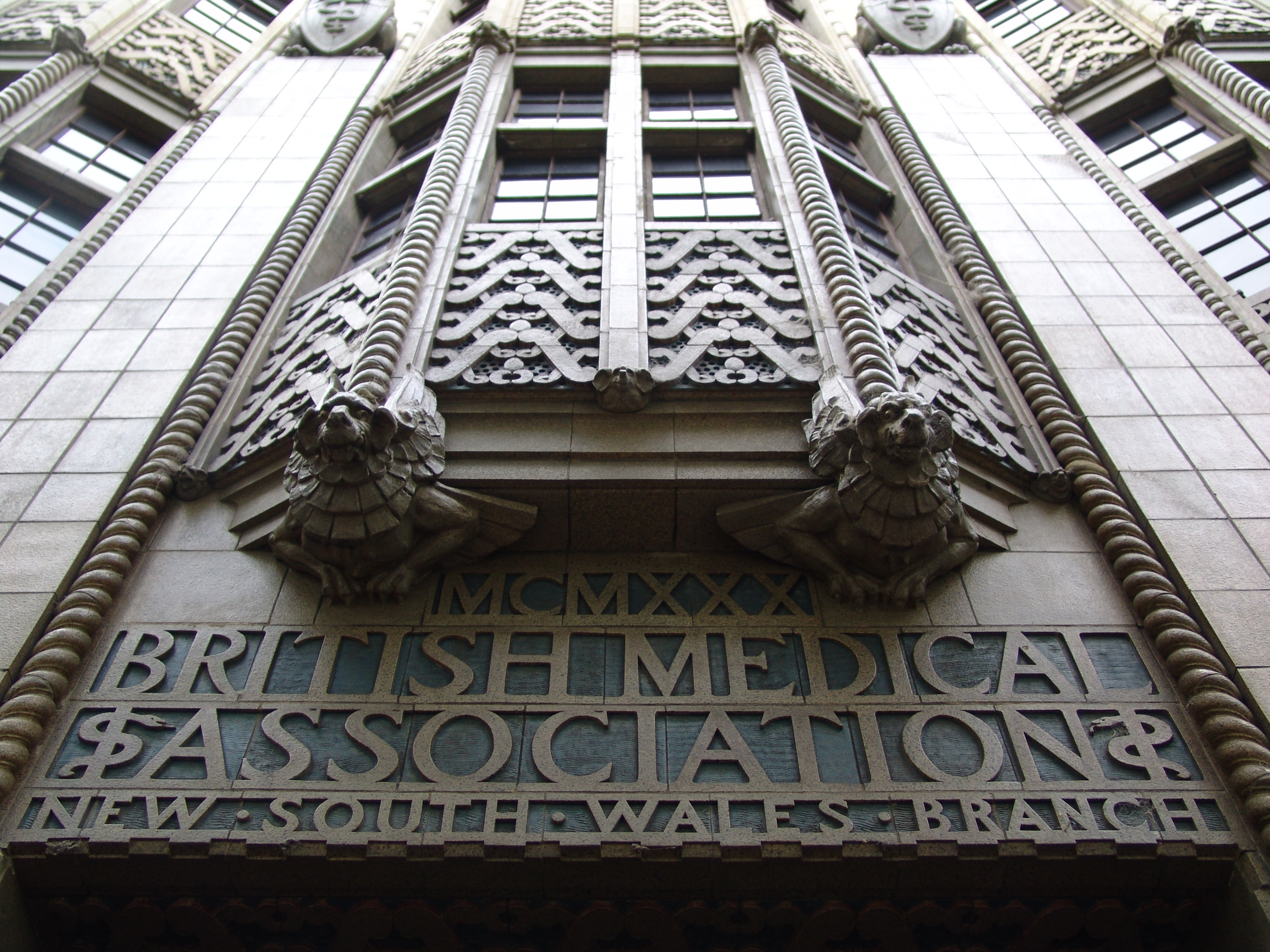
The entrance of the former BMA House located at 135-137 Macquarie Street Sydney, home to the New South Wales Branch of the BMA and then the AMA from 1930 to 1980.

In 1911, the South Australian branch of the BMA resolved that a federal committee be established to co-ordinate activities with the other Australian branches. The motion was made by William Thornborough Hayward.

The BMA Branches of the Australian states and territories formally merged into the Australian Medical Association in 1962.

== Presidents ==
1. Cecil Colville (1962–1964)
2. Sir Angus Murray (1964–1967)
3. Clarence Rieger (1967–1970)
4. Roderick Macdonald (1970–1972)
5. Gavin Johnson (1972–1973)
6. Sir Keith Jones (1973–1976)
7. Rupert Magarey (1976–1979)
8. Lionel Wilson (1979–1982)
9. Lindsay Thompson (1982–1985)
10. Trevor Pickering (1985–1988)
11. Bryce Phillips (1998–1990)
12. Bruce Shepherd (1990–1993)
13. Brendan Nelson (1993–1995)
14. David Weedon (1995–1996)
15. Keith Woollard (1996–1998)
16. David Brand (1998–2000)
17. Kerryn Phelps (2000–2003)
18. Bill Glasson (2003–2005)
19. Mukesh Haikerwal (2005–2007)
20. Rosanna Capolingua (2007–2009)
21. Andrew Pesce (2009–2011)
22. Steve Hambleton (2011–2014)
23. Brian Owler (2014–2016)
24. Michael Gannon (2016–2018)
25. Tony Bartone (2018–2020)
26. Omar Khorshid (2020–2022)
27. Steve Robson (2022–2024)
28. Danielle McMullen (2024–current)

== Other personnel ==
- Natalia Centellas, Secretary General (2022–present)
- Martin Laverty, Secretary General (2019–2022)
- Dr M.T Schaper (2018)
- Anne Trimmer, Secretary General (2013–2018)
- Francis J. Sullivan, secretary general (2008–2012)
- Kerry Gallagher, secretary general (2007–2008)
- Ralph Howard, assistant general secretary (1964–1965)

== Coat of arms ==
Coat of arms of the Australian Medical Association
Adopted Granted by the Kings of Arms (and supporters by Garter) on 10 June 1963 (Earl Marshal's warrant, 30 July 1962). Crest On a Wreath Argent and Vert, a Kangaroo proper, holding between the fore paws a Sun in splendour Or. Helm A closed Helmet, mantling Gules, doubled Argent. Escutcheon Argent, on a Cross formy throughout Gules, within a Bordure Ermine, a Rod of Aesculapius Or. Supporters On either side a Unicorn Argent, unguled armed and crined Or, supporting between the forelegs a Staff proper, flying thereon a Pennant per fess Argent and Vert charged with the Badge of the Australian Medical Association. Compartment A field of Grass Vert. Motto Latin: Pro Genere Humano Concordes ("All as one for mankind") Badge A Sun in splendour Or, the face charged with a Cross formy throughout Gules, thereon a Rod of Aesculapius Or. Symbolism The red cross is the international symbol of medical services. The Rod of Asclepius in the centre of the cross is a classical symbol of healing and medicine. The Unicorn was also fabled for its healing properties.

== Positions ==
The AMA has traditionally been a conservative (rather than progressive) body, often opposing change rather than lobbying for change within medicine. For example, the AMA released a press release in early 2019 claiming an "Advocacy breakthrough" which in fact was to "oppose changes" being considered under a wide-ranging review of the Medicare Benefits Schedule. Historically the AMA has tended to oppose "government interference in the practice of medicine" advocating on behalf of the service-providers (doctors) rather than the consumers (patients). The AMA has been recently criticised for accepting the Australian Federal Government's JobSeeker subsidy during the COVID-19 pandemic in Australia despite being profitable during 2020.

=== Climate change ===
The AMA acknowledges the scientific consensus that climate change is real and anthropogenic. In September 2019, the AMA officially declared climate change a public health emergency, stating that "The scientific reality is that climate change affects health and well-being by increasing the situations in which infectious diseases can be transmitted, and through more extreme weather events, particularly heatwaves."

Tony Bartone, AMA President, noted that climate change will cause "higher mortality and morbidity from heat stress; injury and mortality from increasingly severe weather events; increases in the transmission of vector-borne diseases; food insecurity resulting from declines in agricultural outputs; a higher incidence of mental-ill health".

The AMA has agreed with Doctors for the Environment Australia (DEA) that the healthcare sector in Australia should aim for an 80% reduction in emissions by 2030, but the AMA is still supportive of medical procedures with a poor evidence-base that could be considered wasteful and a source of excess emissions. For example, the AMA lobbied the Australian government to continue to fund spinal fusion as a surgical treatment under Medicare, even when there was substantial evidence that spinal fusion is an ineffective procedure and plans were in place to de-fund this surgery.

The AMA has called on the Australian Government to:

- Adopt mitigation targets within an Australian carbon budget
- Promote the health benefits of addressing climate change
- Develop a National Strategy for Health and Climate Change
- Promote an active transition from fossil fuels to renewable energy
- Establish a National Sustainable Development Unit to reduce carbon emissions in the healthcare sector.

=== Community pill-testing ===
The AMA officially endorses trials to use pill-testing at community events such as festivals. AMA President Dr Tony Bartone publicly declared his support for pill-testing at festivals, stating that it would provide "an opportunity to try and inform [drug users] about the dangerous consequences and try to get an opportunity to give them education and access to rehabilitation in terms of trying to reduce their drug dependency." NSW Premier Gladys Berejiklian rejected the AMA's call for pill testing.

=== COVID-19 ===
In June 2021, AMA President Omar Khorshid advocated for the construction of “purpose-built quarantine facilities” across each state and territory in Australia, particularly areas with significant international travel.

== See also ==
- Australian Medical Students' Association
- Medical Journal of Australia
- AMA House, Brisbane
- AMA House, Sydney
