= List of hospitals in Western Australia =

The following is a list of hospitals, hospital support services and palliative care centres in Western Australia. Medical facilities in Western Australia are either run by the State's Department of Health, the Commonwealth, or private institutions of non-government organisations.

== Metropolitan hospital services ==
Hospital	Type
Abbotsford Private Hospital (Formally Niola Private Hospital)	Private
Armadale Health Service	Public
Attadale Hospital	Private
Bentley Health Service	Public
Bethesda Hospital	Private
Sentiens Hospital, Perth	Private
Cambridge Private Hospital	Private
Fiona Stanley Hospital	Public
Fremantle Hospital and Health Service	Public
Glengarry Hospital	Private
Graylands Hospital	Public
Hollywood Private Hospital	Private
HMAS Stirling Health Centre	Commonwealth
Joondalup Health Campus	Jointly operate
Kalamunda District Hospital Campus	Public
King Edward Memorial Hospital for Women	Public
Mount Hospital	Private
Mount Lawley Hospital	Public
Mount Lawley Private Hospital	Private
Osborne Park Hospital	Public
Peel Health Campus	Public
Perth Children's Hospital	Public
Rockingham General Hospital	Public
Rottnest Island Nursing Post	Public
Royal Perth Hospital	Public
Royal Perth Rehabilitation Hospital	Public
Sir Charles Gairdner Hospital	Public
South Perth Hospital	Private
St John of God Midland Private Hospital	Private
St John of God Midland Public Hospital	Public
St John of God Murdoch Hospital	Private
St John of God Subiaco Hospital	Private
Waikiki Private Hospital	Private
West Leederville Private Hospital	Private

== Rural hospital services ==
Hospital	Type
Albany Hospital	Public
Augusta Hospital	Public
Beverley Hospital	Public
Boddington Hospital	Public
Boyup Brook Health Service	Public
Bridgetown Hospital	Public
Broome Hospital	Public
Bruce Rock Memorial Hospital	Public
Bunbury Hospital	Public
Busselton Hospital	Public
Carnarvon Hospital	Public
Christmas Island Health Centre	Commonwealth
Cocos (Keeling) Islands Health Centre	Commonwealth
Collie Hospital	Public
Coolgardie Health Centre	Public
Corrigin Hospital	Public
Cunderdin Hospital	Public
Dalwallinu Hospital	Public
Denmark Hospital and Health Service	Public
Derby Hospital	Public
Dongara Eneabba Mingenew Health Service	Public
Donnybrook Hospital	Public
Dumbleyung Memorial Hospital	Public
Esperance Hospital	Public
Exmouth Hospital	Public
Fitzroy Crossing District Hospital	Public
Geraldton Hospital	Public
Gnowangerup Hospital	Public
Goomalling Hospital	Public
Halls Creek Hospital	Public
Harvey Hospital	Public
Kalbarri Health Centre	Public
Kalgoorlie Hospital	Public
Karratha Health Campus	Public
Katanning Hospital	Public
Kellerberrin Memorial Hospital	Public
Kojonup Hospital	Public
Kondinin Districts Health Service	Public
Kununoppin and Districts Health Service	Public
Kununurra Hospital	Public
Lake Grace Hospital	Public
Laverton District Hospital	Public
Leonora Hospital	Public
Margaret River Hospital	Public
Meekatharra Hospital	Public
Merredin Health Service	Public
Moora Hospital	Public
Morawa and District Health Service	Public
Mullewa Health Service	Public
Murray District Hospital	Public
Nannup Hospital	Public
Narembeen Memorial Hospital	Public
Narrogin Hospital	Public
Newman Hospital	Public
Norseman District Hospital	Public
North Midlands Health Service	Public
Northam Hospital	Public
Northampton Kalbarri Health Service	Public
Onslow Hospital	Public
Paraburdoo Hospital	Public
Peel Health Campus	Public
Pemberton Hospital	Public
Pingelly Hospital	Public
Plantagenet Hospital	Public
Port Hedland Hospital	Public
Quairading Hospital	Public
Ravensthorpe Health Centre	Public
Roebourne Hospital	Public
Southern Cross Hospital	Public
St John of God Bunbury Hospital	Private
St John of God Geraldton Hospital	Private
Tom Price Hospital	Public
Wagin Hospital	Public
Warren Hospital	Public
Wickham Health Centre	Public
Wongan Hills Hospital	Public
Wyalkatchem-Koorda and Districts Hospital	Public
Wyndham Hospital	Public
Yarloop Hospital	Public
York Health Hospital	Public

== Hospital support services ==
Service	Type
Australian Red Cross Blood Service	NGO
Health Support Services	Public
PathWest	Public
Silver Chain Nursing Association	NGO
St John of God Pathology	Private

== Palliative care ==
Service	Type
Brightwater Care Group	Private
Bethesda Hospital	Private
Hollywood Private Hospital	Private
Murdoch Community Hospice	Private
The Cottage Hospice	Private

== Closed hospitals ==
Service	Type
Denmark District Hospital	Public
Fremantle Asylum	Public
Kaleeya Hospital	Public/Maternity
Newcastle Hospital (Toodyay)	Public
Nickol Bay Hospital (Karratha)	Public
Old York Hospital	Public
Princess Margaret Hospital	Public
Rotunda Hospital / Edward Millen Home / Hillview Hospital	Private/Public
Sunset Hospital	Private
Swan District Hospital	Public
Swanbourne Hospital	Public
Woodside Hospital	Public
Woodvale Private Hospital for Women	Private
