= Timeline of Geelong history =

This is a timeline of major events in the history of the city of Geelong, Australia.

== 19th century ==
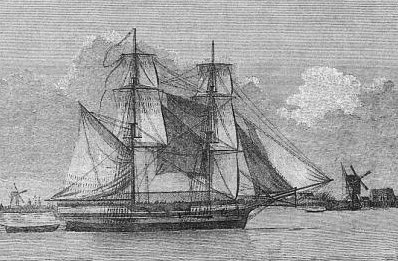
Woodcut of the Lady Nelson

- 1802 – Lady Nelson enters Corio Bay
- 1803 – Escaped convict William Buckley living in area.
- 1835 – John Batman establishes base camp at Indented Head
- 1838 – Geelong township surveyed, Geelong population is 545.
- 1839 – First sale of Geelong town allotments
- 1839 – First postal mail between Geelong and Melbourne
- 1840 – First issue of the Geelong Advertiser newspaper is published
- 1842 – First St Mary's Catholic Church opens
- 1845 – Geelong Keys discovered at Corio Bay
- 1849 – The Geelong town council is incorporated.
- 1850 – Geelong is the fifth largest town in Victoria.
- 1851 – Gold is found in the Mount Bunninyong district
- 1851 – Geelong population is 8,000
- 1853 – Geelong population is 22,000
- 1855 – Geelong Grammar School founded
- 1855 – St Augustine's Boys Orphanage established
- 1857 – Victoria's first country railway from Geelong to Melbourne is built
- 1859 – Thomas Austin releases 24 rabbits into the wild on his property 'Barwon Park' at Winchelsea just outside Geelong on Christmas Day, introducing the rabbit to Australia.
- 1862 – Geelong to Ballarat railway opens
- 1888 – First telephone exchange in Geelong opens
- 1890 – Geelong Cementworks Opens

== 20th century ==
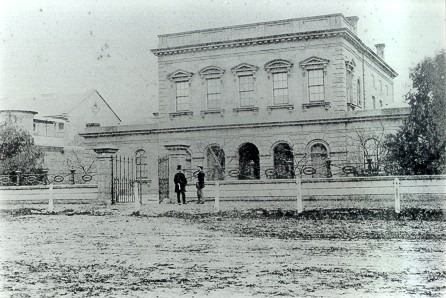
The former Geelong Law Courts, in Myers Street, Geelong.

- 1910 – Geelong officially becomes a city
- 1912 – Electric trams begin operation in Geelong
- 1912 – First automatic telephone exchange in the Southern Hemisphere opens in Geelong
- 1920 – Royal Australian Navy's submarine fleet based at Osborne House
- 1925 – Geelong Football Club wins premiership
- 1925 – Ford Australia plant opens at Norlane
- 1925 – Retail chain Target opens first store in Geelong
- 1926 – Geelong suburb Highton gets struck by tornado
- 1930 – 3GL radio station opens
- 1931 – Geelong Football Club wins premiership
- 1937 – Geelong Football Club wins premiership
- 1940 – Manning Clark begins teaching at Geelong Grammar School
- 1951 – Geelong Football Club wins premiership
- 1952 – Geelong Football Club wins premiership
- 1954 – Shell refinery opens at Corio
- 1956 – Electric trams cease operation in Geelong
- 1963 – Geelong Football Club wins premiership
- 1963 – Alcoa aluminum smelter opens at Point Henry
- 1965 – Holy Cross Hospital (later St John of God Geelong Hospital) opens
- 1977 – First students enrolled at Deakin University at Waurn Ponds
- 1980 – Christian College opens
- 1983 – Ash Wednesday fires cause major damage at nearby coastal areas
- 1987 – National Wool Museum opens
- 1990 – First commercial FM Radio station K-Rock begins FM broadcasting
- 1990 – Pyramid Building Society collapse
- 1991 – HM Prison Geelong officially closes

== 21st century ==
- 2000 - Fully-restored Victorian era carousel opened in new pavilion on the waterfront
- 2001 – Geelong population is 184,332
- 2002 – 23 May, Skilled Stadium hosts a visit from the Dalai Lama
- 2003 – Former mayor Frank De Stefano is sentenced to 10 years imprisonment on fraud charges involving A$8.3 million
- 2006 – Geelong population is 210,000 becoming the 12th largest city in Australia
- 2007 – Geelong Football Club wins premiership by record margin of 119 points
- 2009 – Geelong Football Club wins premiership
- 2010 – Geelong Ring Road construction Complete
- 2011 – Geelong Football Club wins premiership
- 2015 – Worksafe Victoria Headquarters Construction started
- 2016 – Geelong population is 253,269
- 2016- A giant cell storm comes through Geelong, flooding the Barwon and Moorabool rivers, along with Belmont, South Geelong, and Newtown.
- 2016 – End of Ford's car manufacturing
- 2018 – Worksafe Victoria Headquarters Construction complete
- 2019 – The Mercer and Miramar Geelong construction started
- 2020 - COVID-19 reaches Geelong. Total of 2,370 cases confirmed since arrival date
- 2020 - Devastating Storm hits Geelong causing Tornado in Suburb of Waurn Ponds

Timeline of tallest buildings in Geelong:

1. The Miramar – 71 m (2019)

2. The Mercer – 64 m (2019)

3. Worksafe Headquarters Geelong – 60 m (2018)

4. Mercure Hotel – 40 m (2008)

6. Shell Refinery – 40 m (1946)

7. Fyansford Cementworks – 30 m (1954)

== See also ==
- History of Victoria
