= St John of God Midland Private Hospital =

Hospital in Perth, Western Australia

- St John of God Health Care
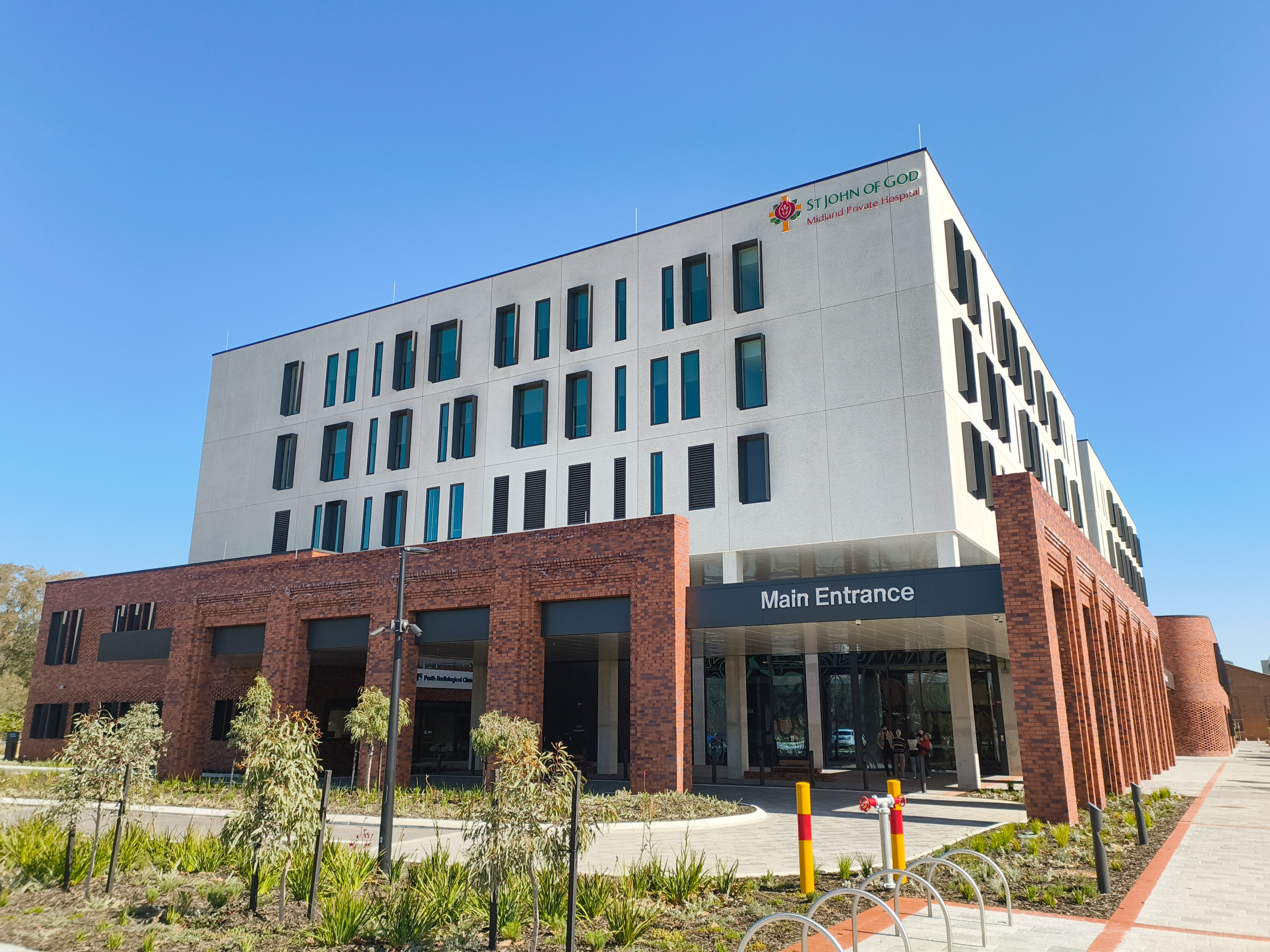
- The St John of God Midland Private Hospital in August 2026

Geography
- Location: 41 Watertank Way, Midland, Western Australia, Australia
- Coordinates: 31.896814°S 116.004969°E

Organisation
- Care system: Private

Services
- Emergency department: No
- Beds: 123

History
- Opened: August 27, 2026

Links
- Lists: Hospitals in Australia

St John of God Midland Private Hospital is a private hospital in Midland, Western Australia, operated by St John of God Health Care, a Catholic not-for-profit healthcare group. The 123-bed facility is located within the historic Midland Railway Workshops precinct and opened to patients on 27 August 2026.

== History ==
The St John of God Midland Public and Private Hospitals opened in November 2015, replacing the former Swan District Hospital. The co-located campus combined a 307-bed public hospital with a 60-bed private hospital operated by St John of God Health Care. In June 2023, the Western Australian Treasury exercised a contractual right to purchase the 60 private beds for conversion to public use.

In January 2024, St John of God Health Care announced plans to build a new, standalone private hospital approximately 300 metres from the existing campus. The project was delivered by construction company Built. Practical completion of the new hospital was reached in June 2026.

The facility opened to patients on 27 August 2026. Its opening coincided with the transfer of the remaining private beds and surgical theatres at the original co-located campus to public use, converting that site into a fully public 367-bed hospital.

== Facilities and services ==
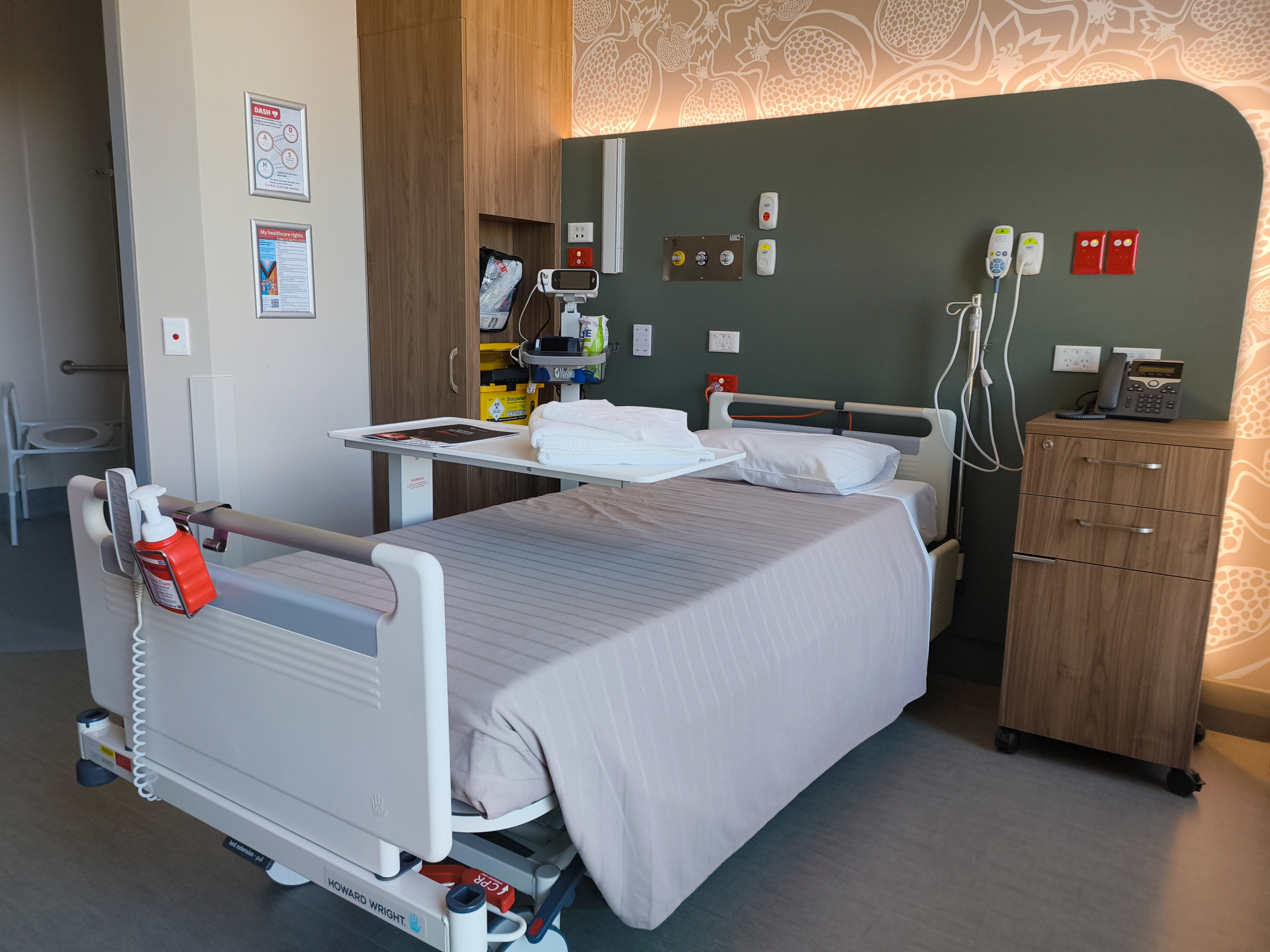
Patient room

St John of God Midland Private Hospital has 123 beds, an intensive care and coronary care unit, eight operating theatres, a day surgery unit, and an interventional cardiology catheterisation laboratory. The hospital provides a range of medical and surgical specialties and offers on-demand room service dining for inpatients. The hospital does not operate an emergency department.

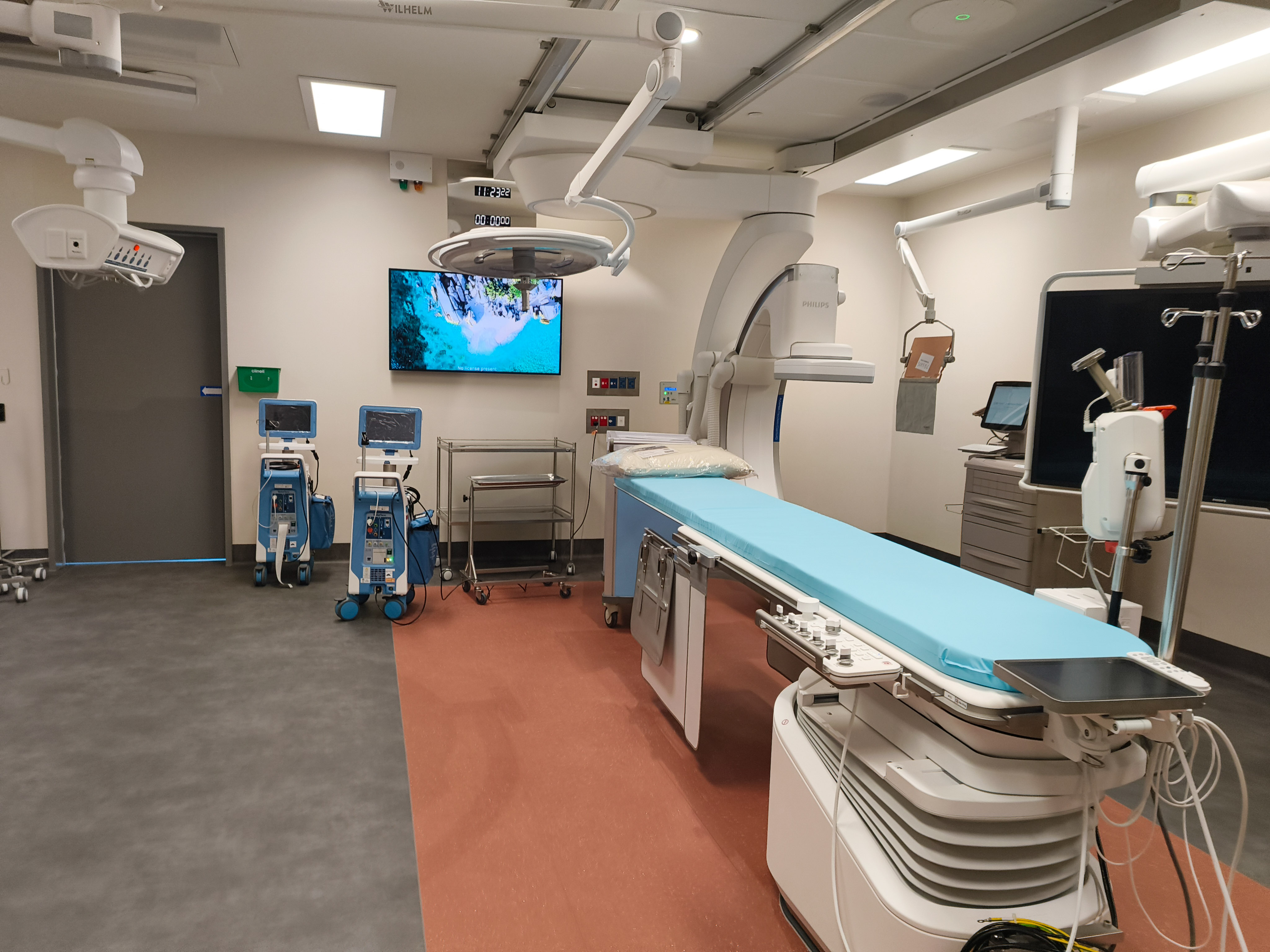
Angiography suite
