= Mount Lawley Hospital =

- Department of Health
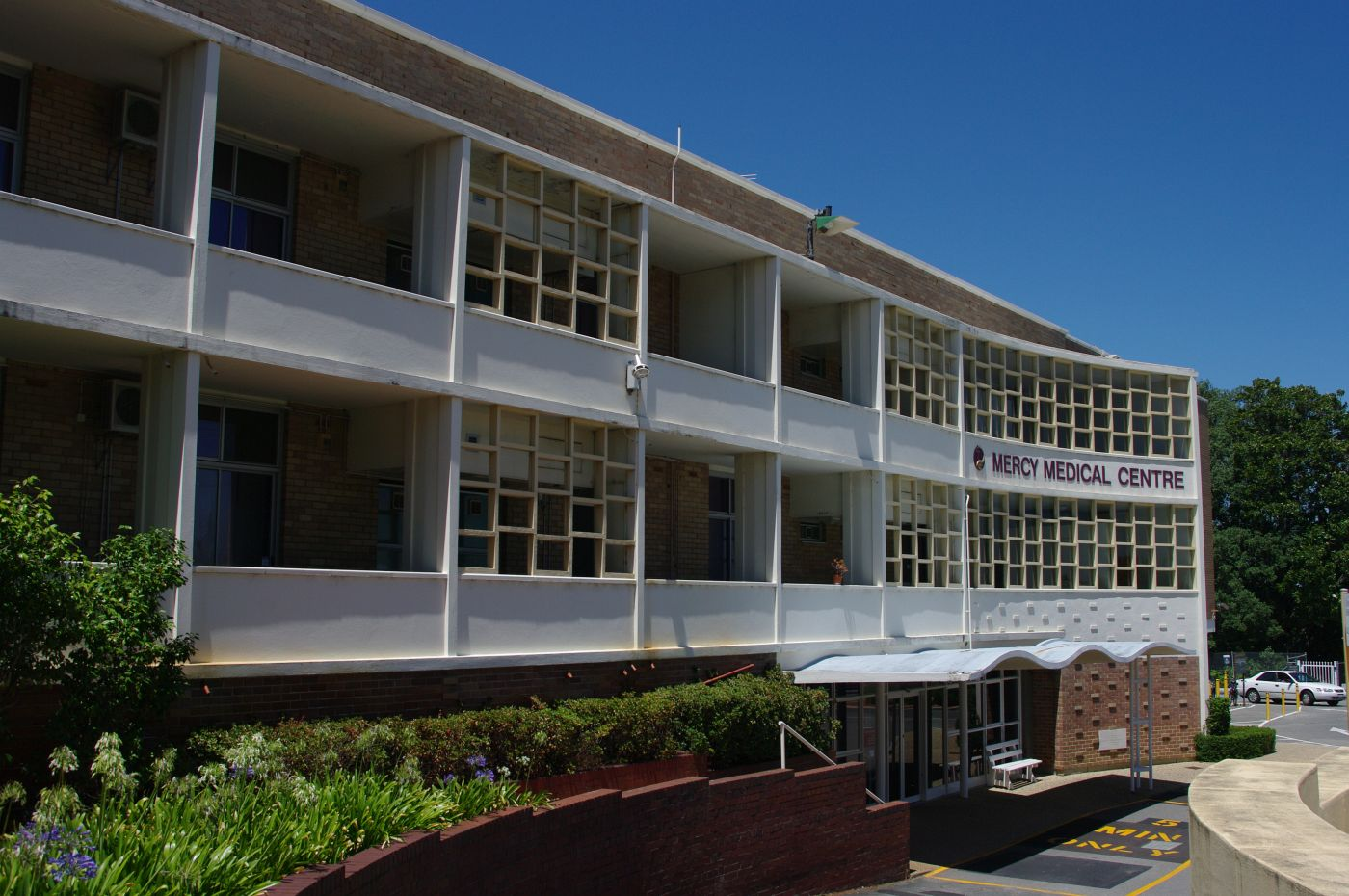
- Mercy Hospital medical suite wing

Geography
- Location: Mount Lawley, Western Australia
- Coordinates

Organisation
- Care system: Medicare
- Type: General

Services
- Beds: 205

History
- Former names: Mercy Hospital; St Anne's Hospital; St John of God Mt Lawley Hospital
- Opened: 1937

Links
- Website: emhs.health.wa.gov.au

Mount Lawley Hospital, formerly St John of God Mt Lawley Hospital, is a 205-bed public hospital located on the banks of the Swan River in Mount Lawley, Western Australia.

Established in 1937, the hospital was initially known as St Anne's Hospital. In September 2026 it was taken over by the Government of Western Australia.

== History ==
Mercy Hospital was established by the Sisters of Mercy as St Anne's Nursing Home on 10 April 1937 and later as St Anne's Hospital. In 1996 it changed its name to Mercy Hospital as part of commemorations celebrating the 150th anniversary of the arrival of the Sisters of Mercy in the state.

St John of God Health Care purchased the hospital in November 2013. It became known as St John of God Mt Lawley Hospital on 5 May 2014, and the official handover ceremony took place on 6 June of that year.

On November 2025, the Government of Western Australia announced it had purchased the hospital. The sale took effect on 1 September 2026 with the hospital becoming a public hospital as part of the Department of Health system and being renamed Mount Lawley Hospital.

== Facilities ==
Mount Lawley Hospital has 205 beds and eight operating theatres. The hospital also contains endoscopy, pathology, radiology, a hydrotherapy pool and an on-site specialist medical centre.
