= Ron Tandberg =

Australian illustrator and cartoonist

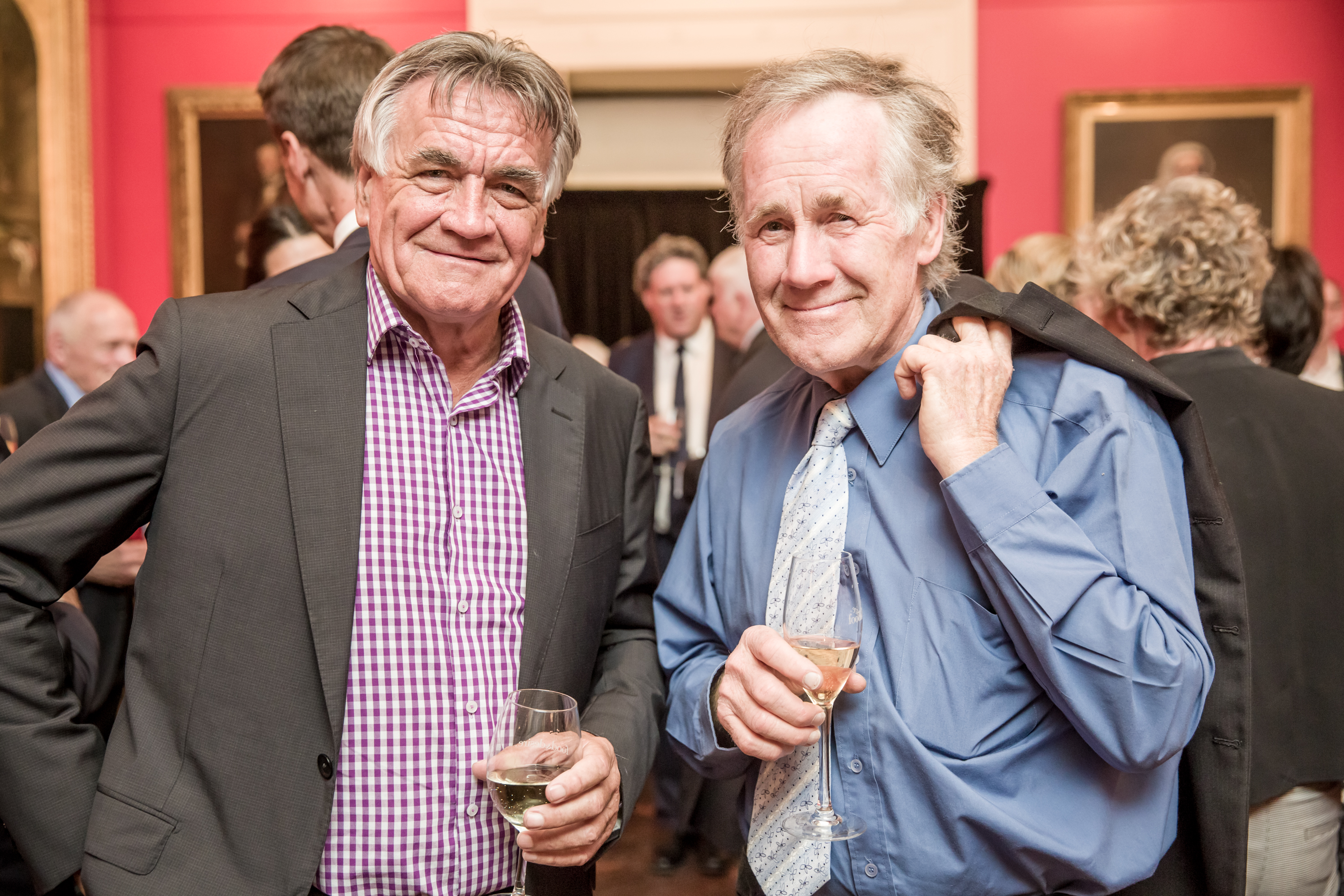
- Tandberg (right) with Barrie Cassidy at 2015 Melbourne Press Club Hall of Fame event.
- Born: Ronald Peter Tandberg; 31 December 1943; Melbourne, Victoria, Australia
- Died: 8 January 2018 (aged 74); Geelong, Victoria, Australia
- Occupation: Cartoonist
- Years active: 1963–2017
- Employer: The Age

Ronald Peter Tandberg (31 December 1943 – 8 January 2018) was an Australian illustrator and political cartoonist who contributed to The Age newspaper in Melbourne, Australia from 1972. Tandberg's credits include eleven Walkley Awards. He was inducted into the Melbourne Press Club's Victorian Hall of Fame in 2014.

== Early life and education ==
Tandberg was born in Melbourne to working-class parents and raised in a small house at the suburb of Pascoe Vale South. His grandfather was a builder who gave away his money during the Great Depression and believed in communist ideas. Raised a Catholic, his father was a maintenance electrician while his mother was an overlocker who worked in a knitting mill. Both his parents worked at William Angliss Meatworks. He attended a Catholic primary school (St Fidelis' Primary) in Moreland, St Ambrose primary school Brunswick, St Joseph's College, and then Coburg Technical School. Qualifying for a teaching certificate, he worked as an art teacher, then attended RMIT to study art and graphic design.

== Artistic career ==
Tandberg started working at Leader Community Newspapers in 1963, although he claimed he lost this job for impersonating his boss. At around the same time, he was producing a regular comic strip called "Fred and Others" which was syndicated to The Herald in Melbourne, The Advertiser in Adelaide, and eventually international papers including The Washington Post and the Los Angeles Times. After a few newspapers dropped the strip, Tandberg approached The Age about taking it on. Editor Graham Perkin declined, but offered him a job as a political cartoonist, which he reluctantly accepted in 1972, thus beginning a 45-year career with the newspaper. Tandberg became known for his distinctive "pocket" cartoons—minimalist single-panel images to complement and draw attention to a story.

Tandberg illustrated an HIV/AIDS prevention poster campaign for the National AIDS Education Council with the tag line "If it's not on, it's not on" (referring to a condom), which was widely distributed in Australia in the early 1990s.

== Death ==
Tandberg died of oesophageal cancer at St John of God Hospital, in Geelong, Victoria, surrounded by his family, in the afternoon of 8 January 2018, at the age of 74. He was survived by his wife, Glen, five children and seven grandchildren.

== Bibliography ==
- Tandberg, Ron (1981). The Age of Tandberg. ISBN 0-7131-8044-7.
- Tandberg, Ron (1982). Tandberg Draws the Line: The Second Age of Tandberg. ISBN 0-7131-8052-8.
- Tandberg, Ron (1984). Tandberg's Age of Consensus. Anne O'Donovan Pty Limited. ISBN 0-9084-7616-7.
- Tandberg, Ron (1994). The Ageless Tandberg. ISBN 1-86350-161-4.
