= St John of God Midland Public Hospital =

Hospital in Perth, Western Australia

- St John of God Health Care
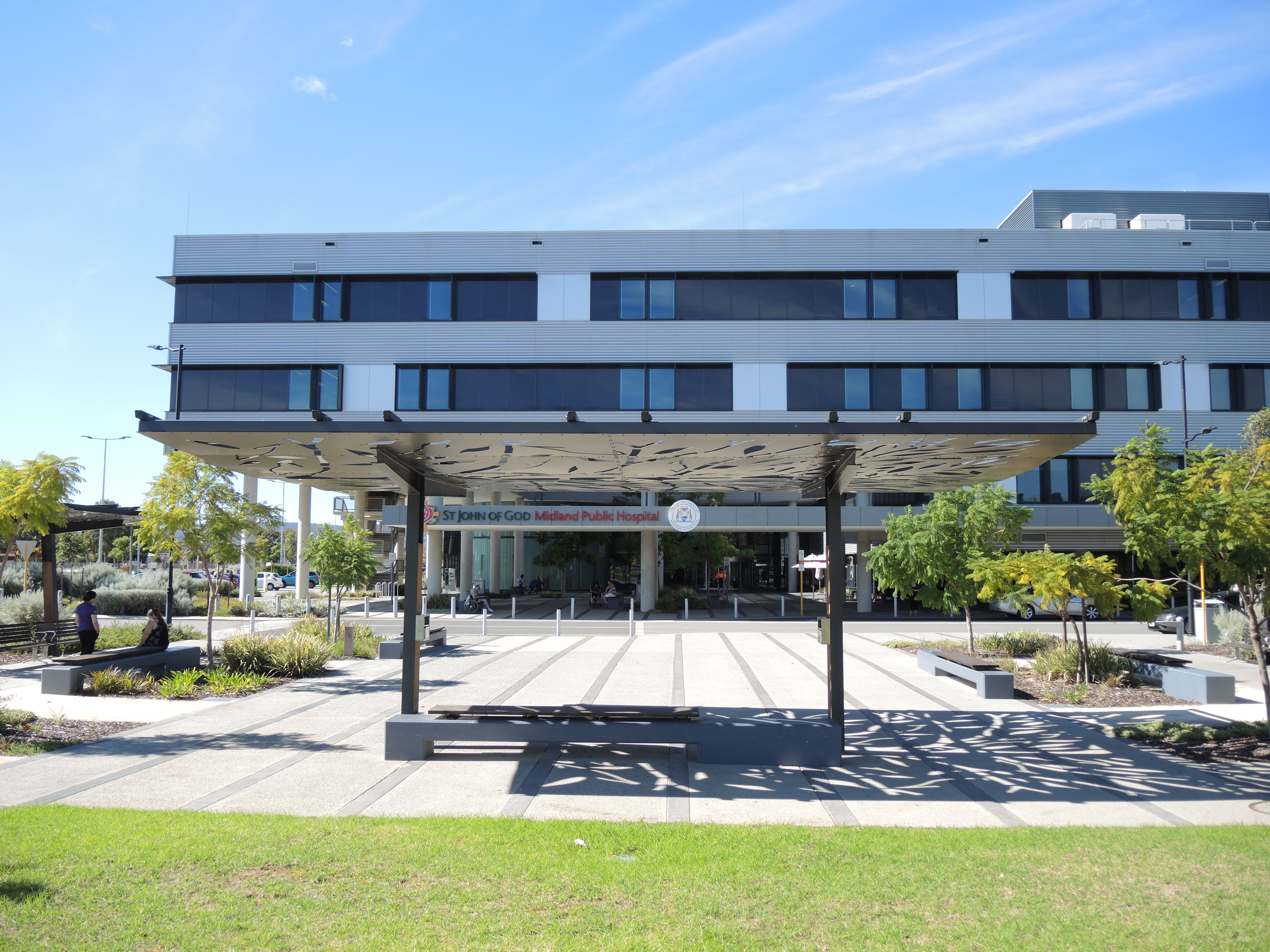

Geography
- Location: 1 Clayton Street, Midland, City of Swan, Western Australia, Australia
- Coordinates: 31°53′41″S 116°00′33″E

Services
- Emergency department: Yes
- Beds: 367

History
- Founded: November 2015; 11 years ago

Links
- Lists: Hospitals in Australia

St John of God Midland Public Hospital is a health care facility in Midland, Western Australia which opened in November 2015.

St John of God Health Care built and operates the hospital under a public-private partnership with the Western Australian state government. St John of God Midland Public Hospital has replaced the nearby Swan District Hospital.

== History ==
Since 1954 the Midland area has been served by Swan District Hospital, which initially opened as a maternity hospital, and expanded to a general hospital in 1963. The hospital was further developed in 1971 and 2001.

In September 2005, the then Health Minister Jim McGinty announced that the hospital would be upgraded to a 326-bed general hospital, either through redevelopment of the existing campus, or construction of a new campus in Midland. He confirmed in November 2005 that a new hospital would be built at the site of the former Midland Railway Workshops.

In March 2010 Health Minister Kim Hames confirmed that the new $360 million Midland Health Campus would be provided by a private operator, under a public-private partnership. Expressions of interest were called for in October 2010, with St John of God Health Care announced as the campus operator on 14 June 2012 under a 20 year contract to the Department of Health. St John of God Health Care's plan included a 60-bed private hospital, which some shared services with a 307-bed public hospital within the same building complex. As part of the contractual agreement, the Department of Health included a clause allowing them the option to purchase and convert the private hospital floorspace for public use if the need arose, with St John of God given assurances by the Metropolitan Redevelopment Authority that land would be made available for an additional stand-alone private hospital if the decision was made to convert the hospital from a public-private partnership to a fully public facility.

Construction began in August 2012, and the hospital opened on 24 November 2015 with Swan District Hospital closing at the same time.

In June 2023, the State Treasury entered discussions with St John of God to purchase the 60 beds and 3 operating theatres within the private hospital, with the intention to convert them for public use and increasing capacity from 307 to 367 beds by mid-2026.

In January 2024, St John of God Health Care announced their intentions to construct a new, standalone private hospital in Midland. The new 126-bed facility opened on 27 August 2026, when the previous private hospital facilities were converted for public use.

== Services ==
Midland Public Hospital provides a range of medical and surgical services. The public hospital includes an emergency department, critical care unit, maternity unit, neonatology unit, paediatric unit, mental health unit, and various clinical support services.

=== Services not offered ===
St John of God Health Care, in accordance with its Catholic values, will not provide some procedures and services, including abortion, sterilisation, contraception, and assisted reproductive technology. In April 2012, the state government expected that this would affect approximately 250 out of 29,000 patients in the hospital's first year after opening. Terry O'Gorman, president of the Australian Council for Civil Liberties, said that this would compromise the principle of secular public services, and called for contract conditions to require patients to be referred elsewhere. The Opposition's health spokesman, Roger Cook, called for the government to cancel the contract with St John of God Health Care. Subsequently, the government revealed that termination, sterilisation, and contraceptive procedures would be performed by another service provider within the public hospital. Assisted reproductive technology, which was not offered at Swan District Hospital, remained at King Edward Memorial Hospital.

== Social outreach ==
St John of God Social Outreach provides a range of community care services in the Midland community, including:

- Care for Aboriginal women and their families when they are pregnant through the Moort Boodjari Mia service.
- St John of God Raphael Services provides perinatal infant mental health care and undertakes research. Staffed by mental health clinicians, Raphael Services provide free support for parents and families affected by anxiety, depression and other mental health difficulties during pregnancy and in the postnatal period. The services also provide counselling and support for parents undergoing prenatal testing or who have experienced pregnancy loss.

== See also ==
- List of hospitals in Western Australia
- List of hospitals in Australia
