= Royal Perth Hospital =

Hospital in Perth, Western Australia

- Department of Health
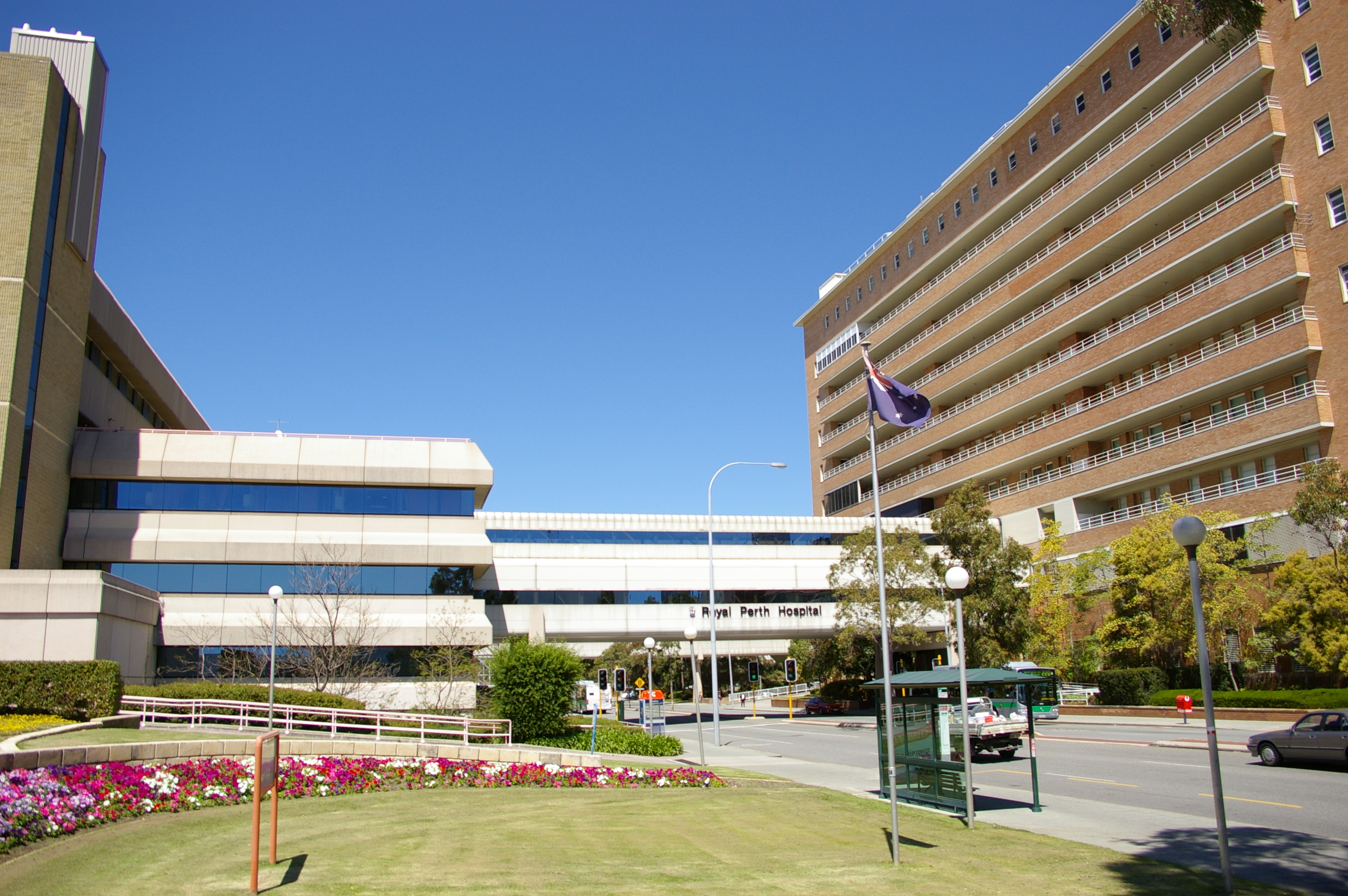
- Royal Perth Hospital from Wellington Street

Geography
- Location: Wellington Street, Perth, City of Perth, Western Australia, Australia
- Coordinates: 31°57′18″S 115°52′01″E

Organisation
- Type: Teaching

Services
- Emergency department: Yes
- Beds: 450

Helipads
- Helipad: Yes

History
- Founded: 1829; 197 years ago

Links
- Website: Official website
- Lists: Hospitals in Australia

Western Australia Heritage Register
- Official name: Royal Perth Hospital Heritage Precinct
- Type: State Registered Place
- Designated: 8 January 2016
- Reference no.: 4289

Royal Perth Hospital (RPH) is a 450-bed adult and teaching hospital located on the northeastern edge of the central business district of Perth, Western Australia.

== History ==
The hospital traces its history back to the first colonial hospital, which was established in a tent on Garden Island, just off the coast of Western Australia, in 1829. In June 1830, the hospital tent was re-erected in Cathedral Avenue, Perth. From 1833 a more substantial colonial hospital operated for a short time from a rented room in a private house. Six years later, in December 1840, this was re-opened in a building formerly used as stables on the corner of St Georges Terrace and Irwin Street. The hospital commenced operations on the corner of Murray Street and Victoria Square on 14 July 1855, and was formally named the Colonial Hospital. In the years since, it has expanded north to Wellington Street. It has been known variously as the Perth Public Hospital, the Perth Hospital and finally, from 1946, as Royal Perth Hospital.

=== Future ===
Initial plans in 2005 were to close down operations at RPH in response to the opening of Fiona Stanley Hospital; however, the Western Australian government's South Metropolitan Services have changed plans since. The main campus on Wellington Street will retain its role as a major adult trauma centre and centre for complex surgeries. The Shenton Park campus (a tertiary rehabilitation centre) has closed down and rehabilitation services moved to Fiona Stanley Hospital.

== Facilities ==
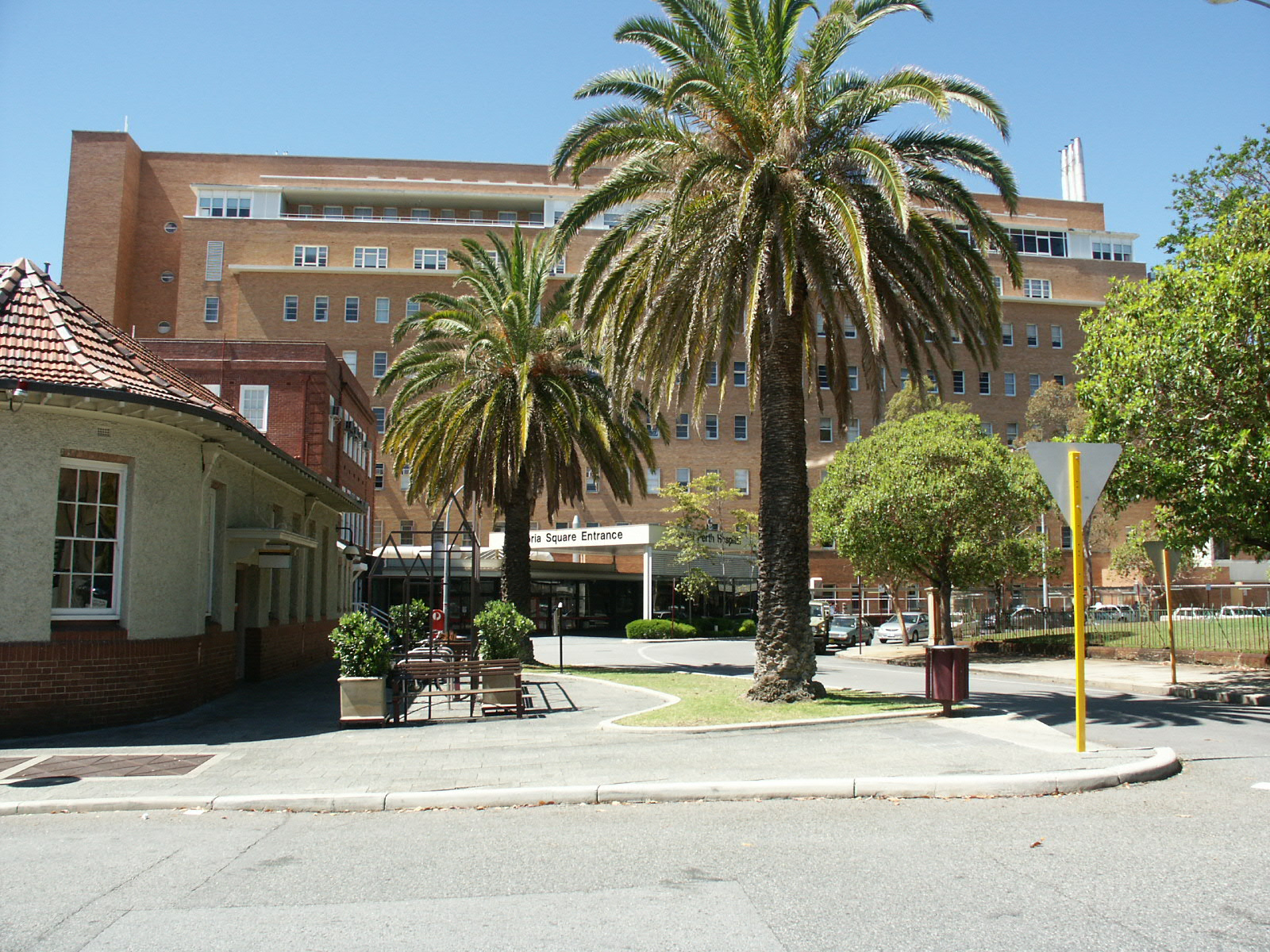
Royal Perth Hospital. Visible buildings are Colonial House (left) and South Block behind

Royal Perth Hospital employs over 6000 people and sees over 70,000 patients each year. Some of the services offered are imaging, trauma and neurosciences, a wide variety of surgical options, critical and emergency care, dermatology, internal medicine, and haematology.

As well as providing a comprehensive array of medical services for adults, Royal Perth exists as a teaching hospital, having close associations with Western Australia's four major universities and TAFE institutions. This allows tertiary institutions to provide practical, professional education opportunities and ensures Royal Perth has well-trained and capable staff.

Royal Perth also fosters relationships with WA's other hospitals, including Sir Charles Gairdner Hospital, Fiona Stanley Hospital and Perth Children's Hospital, ensuring all services are available to inpatients, even if RPH doesn't provide them itself.

== Research ==
The head of research at Royal Perth Hospital is Professor Peter Leedman, and RPH is a leading researcher into both patient recovery and improvements in staff practices. RPH shares its campus with several other major research foundations, including the Western Australian Institute for Medical Research, ensuring several research projects are taking place at any one time. The high standing of RPH researchers is demonstrated by their significant contribution to the annals of international scientific literature each year. In 1998, a total of 158 articles and 114 abstracts were published in refereed medical, nursing and scientific journals. In addition, staff presented a total of 190 papers at national and international professional conferences.

== Shenton Park ==
The Royal Perth Rehabilitation Hospital was first established as an isolation tent hospital in the bush at Shenton Park during the outbreak of smallpox in April 1893. This hospital, variously known as the Isolation Hospital, the Victoria Hospital, the Infectious Diseases Branch and finally as the Royal Perth Rehabilitation Hospital, commenced its role as a major rehabilitation hospital with the rehabilitation of polio patients following the epidemic of 1948–56.

== Personalities ==
Several well-known practitioners and medical researchers have worked at Royal Perth Hospital over the years, including Dr Fiona Wood, winner of the 2005 Australian of the Year Award, and Professor Barry Marshall and Dr Robin Warren, winners of the 2005 Nobel Prize in Physiology.

The Royal Perth Hospital motto is "Servio". The hospital logo is based on the arms of the City of Perth and was first introduced in 1935. It comprises the St George's Cross on a white shield with a black swan in the top left canton and a banner inscribed with the word "Servio".

== Heritage listing ==
Various RPH buildings are listed on the State Register of Heritage Places.

== See also ==
- List of hospitals in Western Australia
- List of hospitals in Australia
