= St John of God Frankston Rehabilitation Hospital =

- St John of God Health Care

Geography
- Location: Frankston, victoria, Australia
- Coordinates: 38.152613°S 145.155769°E

Organisation
- Type: Specialist
- Religious affiliation: Catholic Church

Services
- Beds: 60
- Speciality: Rehabilitation

History
- Constructed: 1976
- Opened: 1977

Links
- Lists: Hospitals in Australia

St John of God Frankston Rehabilitation Hospital is a 60-bed hospital providing specialist inpatient and outpatient rehabilitation care.

Located in Frankston, Victoria, the facility is a specialist rehabilitation hospital, providing neurological, orthopedic, cardiac and reconditioning programs.

The hospital was built in 1976 and opened the following year as Peninsula Private Hospital. It then relocated to a new site in 1999 and shortly after became the Nepean Rehabilitation Hospital. The facility was acquired by St John of God Health Care in March 2004 and renamed St John of God Frankston Rehabilitation Hospital in 2012.

The hospital made global news in 2009 for its work with Russell McPhee, a man who had been paralysed for 20 years. After undertaking a course of botulinum toxin injections – or botox – McPhee was reportedly able to walk again.

St John of God Frankston Rehabilitation Hospital is a division of St John of God Health Care.

== Facilities ==
The hospital has 60 beds, hydrotherapy pool, cardiac, physiotherapy and occupational therapy gyms, a chapel and a pet visiting room.

The facility underwent a $723,000 façade upgrade in 2010, including redevelopment of the cardiac/pulmonary gym.

== Services ==
Rehabilitation services offered by the hospital include:

- Stroke
- Neurological
- Orthopaedic
- Spinal injury
- Cardiac
- Pain management
- Reconditioning
- Pulmonary
- Oncology

== Social outreach ==
In 2010, the hospital partnered with Open Family Australia to introduce a new drug and alcohol educational program for homeless youths in Frankston.

In conjunction with other local businesses, St John of God Frankston Rehabilitation Hospital funds a full-time youth worker to help combat youth homelessness, crime and alcohol and drug-related abuse among troubled youth in the region.
