= St John of God Burwood Hospital =

Australian hospital

- St John of God Health Care

Geography
- Location: Sydney, New South Wales, Australia
- Coordinates: 33.869937°S 151.100022°E

Organisation
- Type: Specialist
- Religious affiliation: Catholic Church

Services
- Speciality: Psychiatric hospital

Links
- Lists: Hospitals in Australia

St John of God Burwood Hospital is an Australian psychiatric hospital in Sydney's Inner West region providing inpatient, day patient, and outpatient mental health care.

St John of God Burwood Hospital is a division of St John of God Health Care, a Catholic, not-for-profit healthcare group serving communities throughout Australia, New Zealand, and the wider Asia-Pacific region with hospitals, home nursing, and social outreach services.

== Facilities ==
St John of God Burwood Hospital is equipped with one electroconvulsive therapy (ECT) suite, one transcranial magnetic stimulation (TMS) interventional laboratory, and the only specialist inpatient mother and baby unit in New South Wales. The hospital operates a Counseling and Therapy Centre on-grounds along with specialised medical consulting rooms at the adjacent Medical Centre.

== Research ==
In 2009, the Perinatal and Women's Mental Health Unit was established through a partnership with St John of God Health Care and the University of New South Wales. Based at the Burwood Hospital and led by Marie-Paule Austin, the unit is the first of its kind in Australia to combine prenatal care and women's mental health services. Austin and her team conduct research into anxiety, depression, bipolar disorder, and other emotional health issues experienced by mothers during pregnancy and after birth.

== See also ==
- List of hospitals in Australia
