= St John of God Berwick Hospital =

- St John of God Health Care

Geography
- Location: Melbourne, Victoria, Australia
- Coordinates: 38.044986°S 145.344822°E

Organisation
- Type: General
- Religious affiliation: Catholic Church

Services
- Beds: 202

History
- Former names: Berwick Hospital, Berwick Bush Nursing Hospital
- Opened: 2018

Links
- Lists: Hospitals in Australia

St John of God Berwick Hospital is a private hospital located in Melbourne, Victoria. It provides health care to Melbourne's south east and regional eastern Victoria.

Originally known as Berwick Hospital, the facility was taken over by St John of God Health Care in 2003. The original hospital was established in 1939 as Berwick Bush Nursing Hospital.

St John of God Berwick Hospital is a division of St John of God Health Care, a leading Catholic not-for-profit health care group, serving communities with hospitals, home nursing, and social outreach services throughout Australia and New Zealand.

== Redevelopment ==
Construction of the new St John of God Berwick Hospital facility at 75 Kangan Dr, Berwick started in January 2016 and opened on 18 January 2018. The new hospital provides 202 beds, including 12 beds in the Day Oncology Centre, eight operating theatres, two procedure rooms, a cardiovascular interventional laboratory, six birth suites and the first intensive care and cardiac care unit for the region.

The old 82-bed hospital on Gibb Street, Berwick is now known as St John of God Langmore Centre, which provides mental health care, including a perinatal mental health inpatient service, for the south east Melbourne community

== Services ==
The services provided by St John of God Berwick hospital include:

- Day surgery
- Medical and surgical services
- Obstetrics and gynaecology
- Special care nursery
- Oncology
- Elective surgery
- Medical care
- Endoscopy
- Critical care

== St John of God Healthcare at Home ==
In 2010, St John of God Health Care launched Healthcare at Home, previously known as Health Choices, in Berwick. The service provides home-based nursing care in Victoria's Casey/Cardinia region.

== Social outreach ==
St John of God Raphael Services provides perinatal infant mental health care and research in Berwick. Staffed by mental health clinicians, Raphael Services provide free support for parents and families affected by anxiety, depression and other mental health difficulties during pregnancy and in the postnatal period. They services also provide counselling and support for parents undergoing prenatal testing or who have experienced pregnancy loss.

== See also ==
- List of hospitals in Australia
