= St John of God Bendigo Hospital =

- St John of God Health Care

Geography
- Location: Bendigo, Central Victoria, Australia
- Coordinates: 36.761938°S 144.263266°E

Organisation
- Type: General
- Religious affiliation: Catholic Church

Services
- Beds: 167

History
- Opened: 2005

Links
- Lists: Hospitals in Australia

St John of God Bendigo Hospital is a 167-bed private hospital located in central Victoria.

St John of God Health Care acquired Mt Alvernia Mercy Hospital in February 2005, renaming it St John of God Bendigo Hospital. The private hospital services the City of Bendigo and Central Victoria.

St John of God Bendigo Hospital is a division of St John of God Health Care, a Catholic not-for-profit health care group, serving communities with hospitals, home nursing, and social outreach services throughout Australia, New Zealand and the wider Asia-Pacific region. Currently the hospital is partially non-functional, and struggles to be viable. An entire ward is unused and the hospital is on unsure footing financially.

== Facilities ==
The 167-bed hospital has six theatres, one endoscopy suite, a cardiac interventional lab and a critical care/intensive care unit, as well as a hydrotherapy pool and gymnasium.

== Services ==
Services provided by St John of God Bendigo Hospital include:

- Medical and surgical care
- Maternity
- Cardiology and coronary care
- Intensive care
- Rehabilitation
- Cancer treatment
- Obstetrics and gynaecology
- Day surgery
- Elective surgery
- Outpatient services

== Social outreach ==
St John of God Raphael Services provides perinatal infant mental health care in Bendigo. Staffed by mental health clinicians, Raphael Services provide free support for parents and families affected by anxiety, depression and other mental health difficulties during pregnancy and in the postnatal period.

They services also provide counselling and support for parents undergoing prenatal testing or who have experienced pregnancy loss.

St John of God Horizon House program provides safe, stable accommodation and support vulnerable young people aged 16–22 years who are currently experiencing, or are at serious risk of, homelessness. The program supports young people to access education, training and employment opportunities and make the transition to independent living.

In 2017, an additional four units were added to enable the service to support 12 young people in the program.
