= St John of God Ballarat Hospital =

- St John of God Health Care

Geography
- Location: Ballarat, Victoria, Australia
- Coordinates: 37.557514°S 143.847692°E

Organisation
- Type: General
- Religious affiliation: Catholic Church

Services
- Beds: 221

History
- Opened: 1915

Links
- Website: www.sjog.org.au/hospitals/ballarat.aspx
- Lists: Hospitals in Australia

St John of God Ballarat Hospital provides hospital care for people living in Ballarat and Western Victoria regions of Australia.

Founded in 1915, the 221-bed hospital is located in the central business district of Ballarat, a city in Victoria, Australia. It is the largest private hospital in regional Victoria.

St John of God Ballarat Hospital is a division of St John of God Health Care, one of the largest Catholic not-for-profit health care providers in Australia, serving communities with hospitals, home nursing, and social outreach services throughout Australia, New Zealand and the wider Asia-Pacific region.

== Facilities ==
St John of God Ballarat Hospital has five operating theatres, including a theatre with stereoscopic laparoscopic equipment, endoscopy unit and a cardiac and vascular angiography suite.

The hospital also has an emergency department, day chemotherapy centre, medical and surgical wards, a maternity unit, day procedure centre and rehabilitation gym and hydrotherapy pool.

== Services ==
The hospital provides a range of health care services, including:

- Emergency medicine
- Coronary care
- Intensive care
- Elective surgery
- Emergency medicine
- Rehabilitation
- Maternity and gynaecology
- Medical and surgical
- Outpatient care
- Community mental health

== Research ==
In collaboration with the Australian Catholic University, St John of God Ballarat Hospital undertakes nursing and midwifery clinical research.

The hospital launched the Ballarat Collaborative Health Research Centre in November 2016, a joint initiative between St John of God Ballarat Hospital, Ballarat Health Services, Australian Catholic University and Federation University.

== Ballarat Cancer Centre ==
Along with Ballarat Health Services, Austin Health and the Ballarat community, St John of God Ballarat Hospital was part of a successful push in 2010 to secure state and federal government funding for a $56.5 million Ballarat Cancer Centre.

The centre will include two new linear accelerators, four radiation oncology bunkers, four extra chemotherapy chairs and a computed tomography scanner. It is expected to be completed by early 2013.

== Social outreach ==
St John of God Raphael Services provides perinatal infant mental health care and research in Ballarat. Staffed by mental health clinicians, Raphael Services provide free support for parents and families affected by anxiety, depression and other mental health difficulties during pregnancy and in the postnatal period. The services also provide counselling and support for parents undergoing prenatal testing or who have experienced pregnancy loss.

St John of God Health Care delivers community mental health support in Ballarat through its Social Outreach services. Pomegranate House Community Psychology Services provides specialised care to the local community and offers holistic, professional and compassionate care tailored to individual needs.

== See also ==
- List of hospitals in Australia
