= Fiona Stanley Hospital =

Hospital in Perth, Western Australia

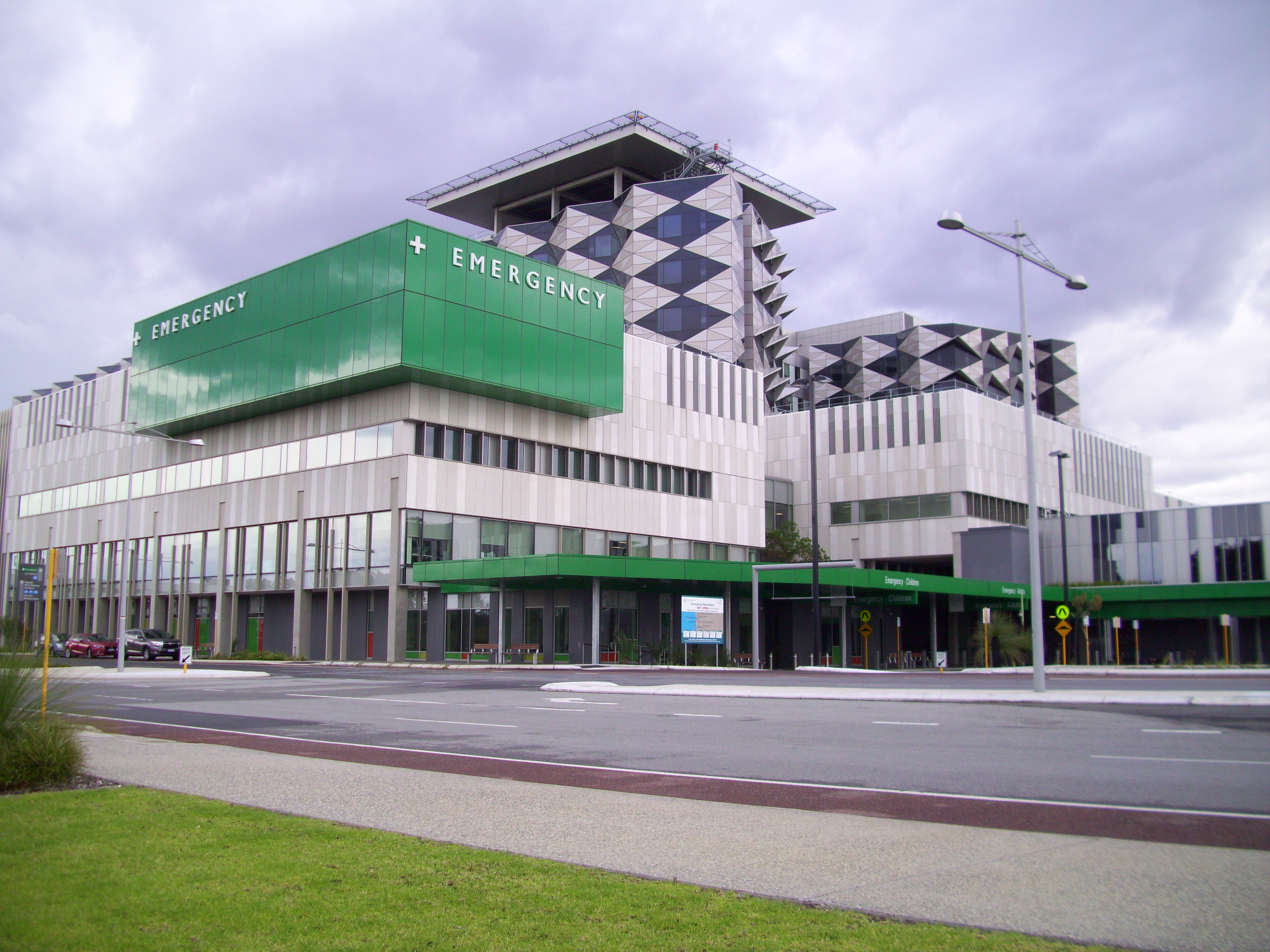

Geography
- Location: Murdoch, City of Melville, Western Australia, Australia
- Coordinates: 32°04′15″S 115°50′49″E

Organisation
- Care system: Medicare

Services
- Emergency department: Yes
- Beds: 783

Helipads
- Helipad: ICAO: YXFH
Number	Length		Surface
Number	ft	m	Surface
1			concrete

History
- Founded: Phase 1: 4 October 2014; Phase 2A: 17 November 2014; Phase 2B: 2 December 2014; Phase 3: 3 February 2015; Phase 4: 23 March 2015

Links
- Website: www.fionastanley.health.wa.gov.au
- Lists: Hospitals in Australia

Fiona Stanley Hospital (FSH) is a state-owned hospital and teaching facility located in Murdoch, Western Australia. Completed in December 2013, the hospital is the largest building project ever undertaken for the Government of Western Australia. It is immediately adjacent to the private St John of God Murdoch Hospital, with the distance between the entrances to the emergency departments of these two hospitals being approximately 390 metres (1,280 ft).

A branch of the Fiona Stanley is the local hospital service on Rottnest Island, known as the Rottnest Island Nursing Post.

== Design ==
The hospital campus includes the main Fiona Stanley Hospital tower with 18 theatres and over 22 wards on nine levels, an education building complete with replica wards and a large tiered lecture theatre, a separate mental health building, the four-storey State Rehabilitation Service building, a pathology building, an administration building and two multi-storey public carparks. The total floor area is 150,000 square metres (1.6 million square feet). Most of the 640 patient bedrooms in the hospital are single-bed en-suite facilities, with less than 10% accommodating two patients.

After completion of the first stage, the initial design of the hospital was to have a capacity of 643 beds. The final design saw the bed capacity increase to 783. The hospital is named after epidemiologist and public health campaigner Fiona Stanley.

The site of the hospital is adjacent to Murdoch railway station, Murdoch University, Wandoo Rehabilitation Prison and the private St John of God Murdoch Hospital. It is located 15 kilometres (9 miles) south of the Perth central business district via the Kwinana Freeway.

== Construction ==
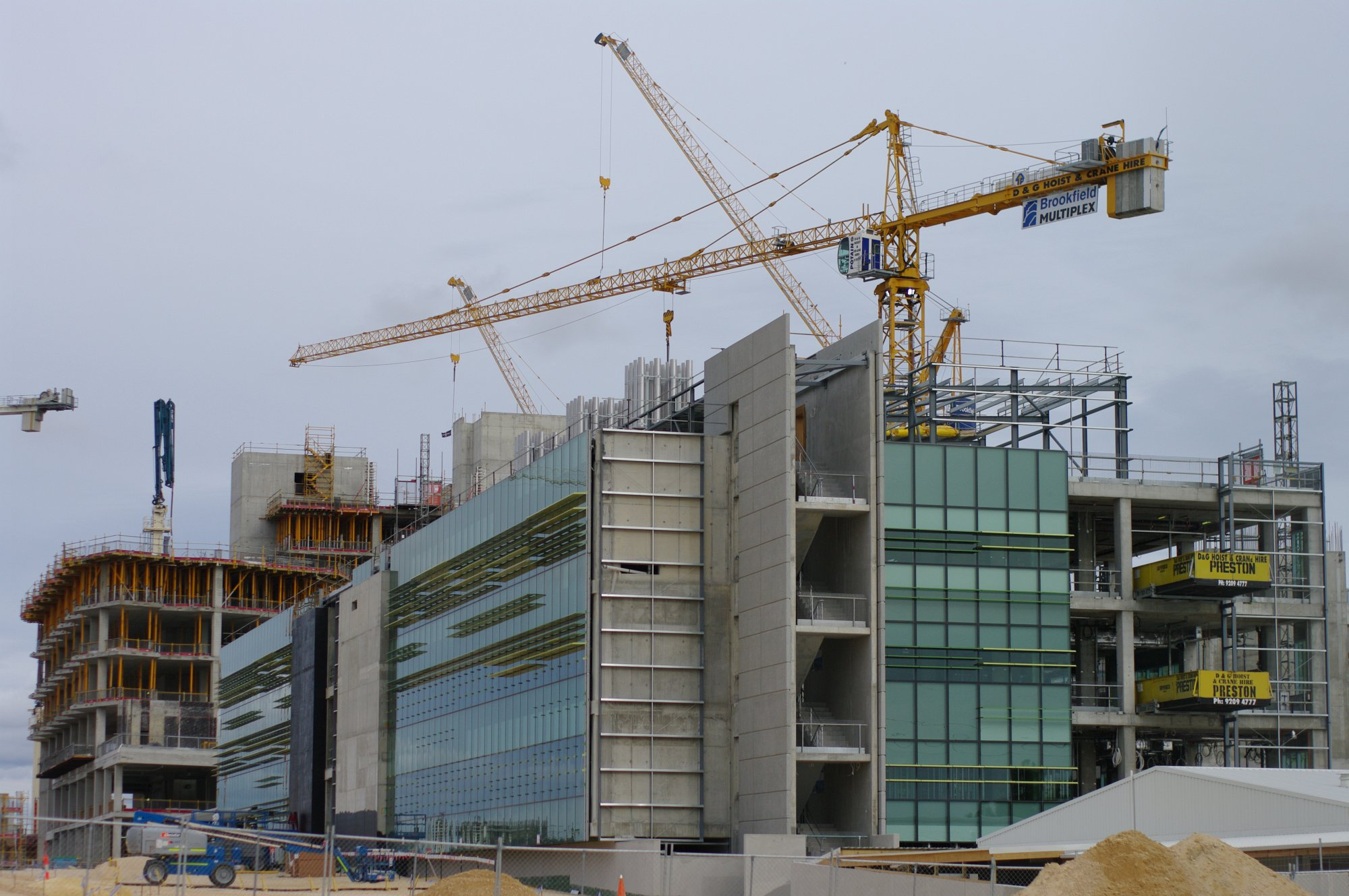
Hospital during construction, December 2010

The entire health campus, comprising several buildings, was designed by the Fiona Stanley Hospital Design Collaboration, a joint venture between the local offices of three architectural practices Silver Thomas Hanley, Hames Sharley and Hassell. After the appointment of the three firms in 2007, construction commenced in 2009, which was estimated to have cost A$2 billion, equivalent to A$2.46 billion in 2022. The directors responsible for the project from each firm were Giorgio Raffa, Warren Kerr and Jeff Menkens. The managing contractor for the project was Multiplex.

== Opening ==
The hospital opened progressively over several months between October 2014 and March 2015. The opening was delayed by six months to October 2014 due to issues with readiness of new integrated state-of-the-art information technology clinical systems. The Fiona Stanley facilities incorporate technological innovations such as automated guided vehicles that deliver catering towards, and mobile computer workstations on wheels to assist staff with dispensing of patient medications while accessing required clinical applications. Most bedrooms also have new multi-purpose, wall-mounted swing-arm, bedside patient entertainment systems incorporating touchscreens and keyboards that patients can use for ordering meals, making phone calls, watching TV or movies/games, which can also be redirected for use by clinical staff via a swipe card for functions such as updating patient records and reviewing diagnostic imaging such as X-rays.

=== Phase 1 ===
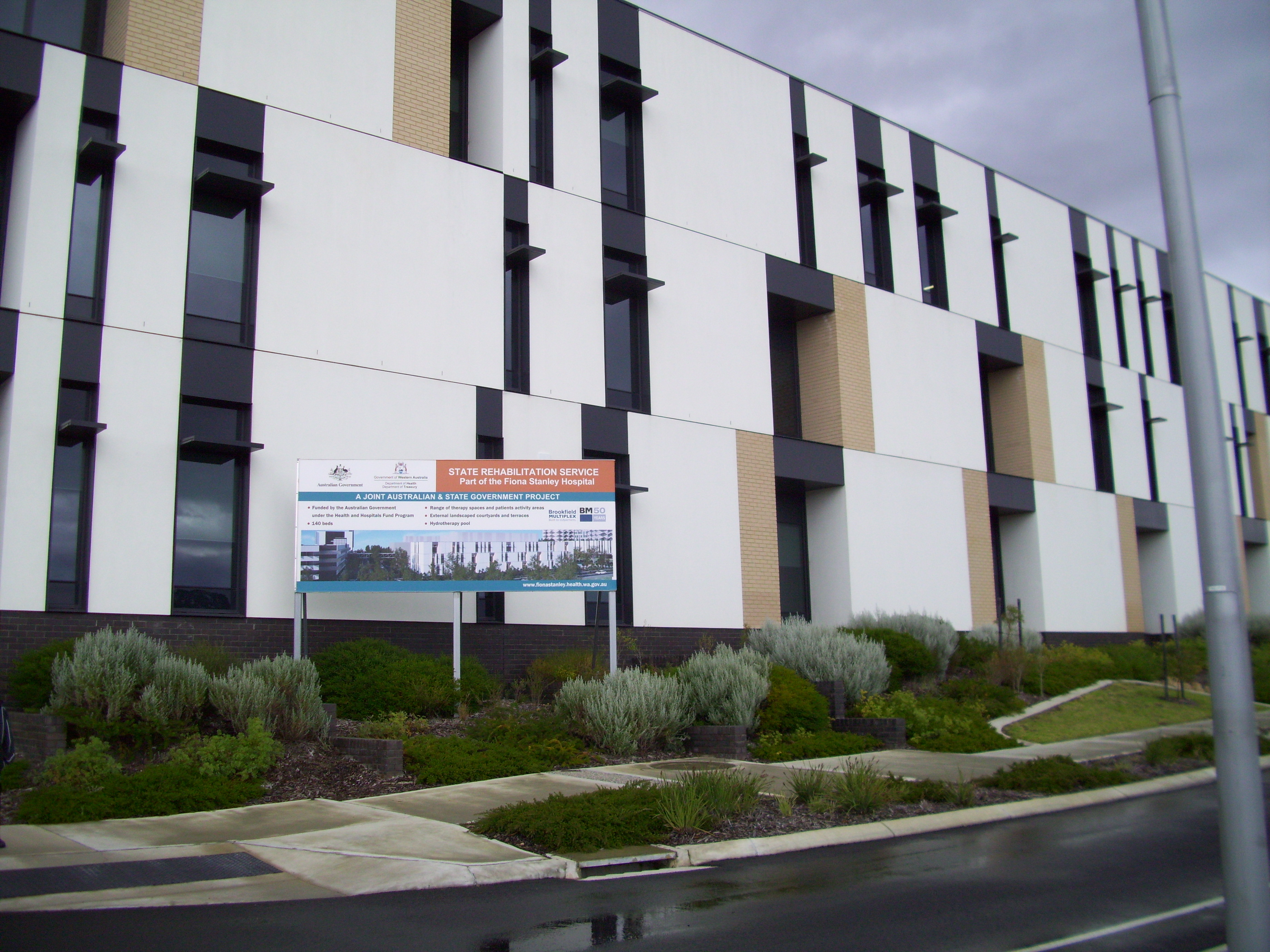
Exterior of the State Rehabilitation Service building at Fiona Stanley Hospital

Phase 1 was the opening of the State Rehabilitation Service, with pathology, pharmacy and medical imaging providing support as required. It opened on 4 October 2014, with patients from Royal Perth Hospital's Shenton Park campus being transferred to the new facility. Approximately 23 vehicles – ambulances, or others suitably equipped – left Shenton Park, transporting more than 80 patients. The new State Rehabilitation Service has a 140-bed capacity.

=== Phase 2 ===
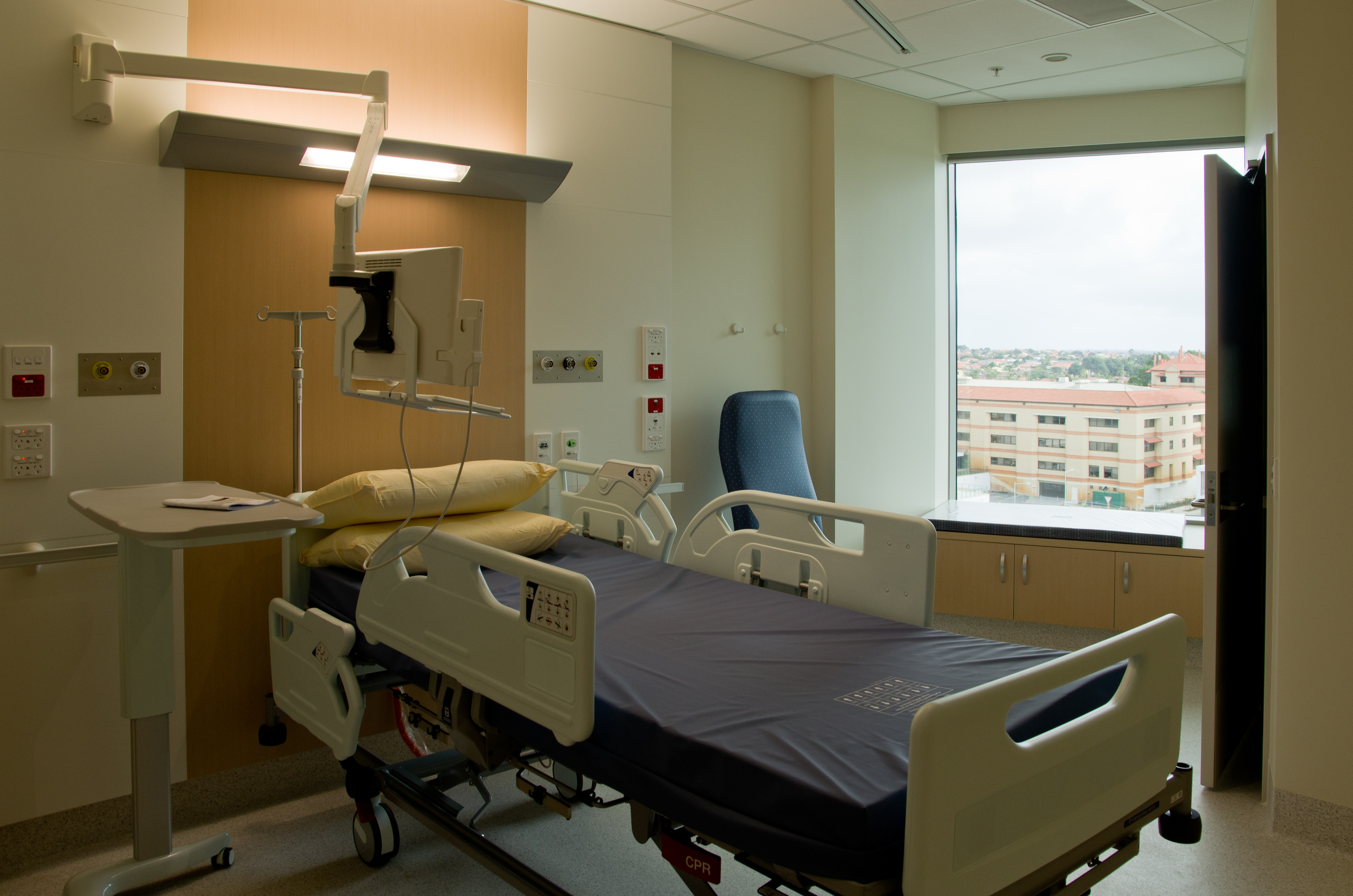
Standard ward room

In Phase 2A, several operating theatres and two 24-bed general wards (surgical and medical) opened on 17 November 2014, along with orthopaedic, anaesthetic, hyperbaric medicine and limited intensive care capability.

Phase 2B in early December included opening of significant maternity services (obstetrics, the birth suite and neonatal services) on level 3 of the main building.

=== Phase 3 ===
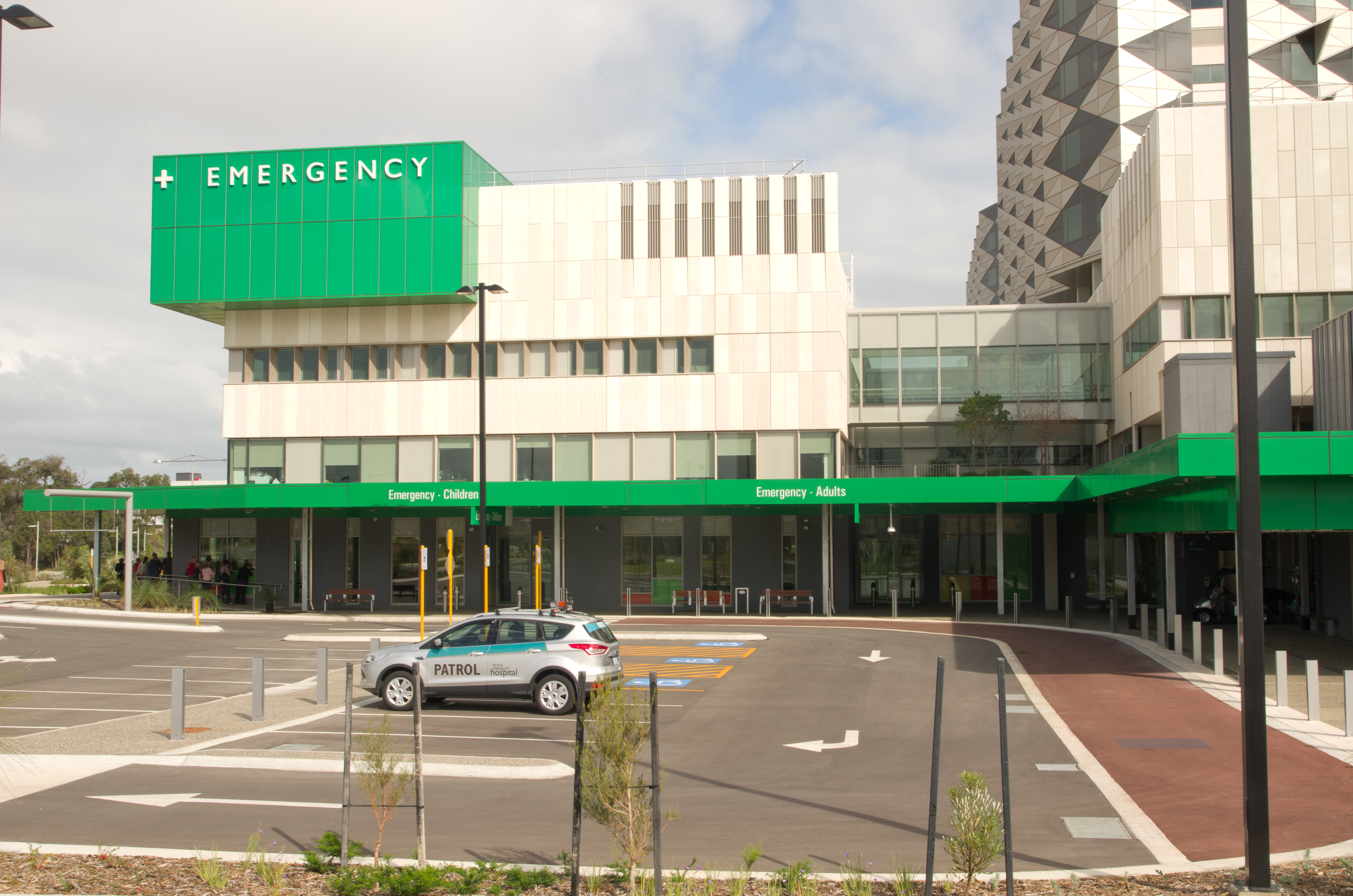
Emergency department of FSH. It opened on 3 February 2015.

Phase 3, the biggest stage, included the opening of the Emergency Department (ED), from 3 February 2015 with 72 beds including a paediatric emergency department. Many ED staff from the Fremantle Hospital moved across on the opening day and the ED at Fremantle closed as scheduled. Most other medical specialities in the main nine-storey main hospital building also opened, including 18 more wards and corresponding outpatient services in 10 clinics.

=== Phase 4 ===
The final Phase 4 included the opening of the heart and lung transplant services in March 2015. The hospital employs approximately 4,000 clinical staff, as well as administrative, and other support staff such as cleaners, catering, equipment sterilisation services and technical support for hospital facilities such as power and security.

== Gallery ==
Main hospital exterior
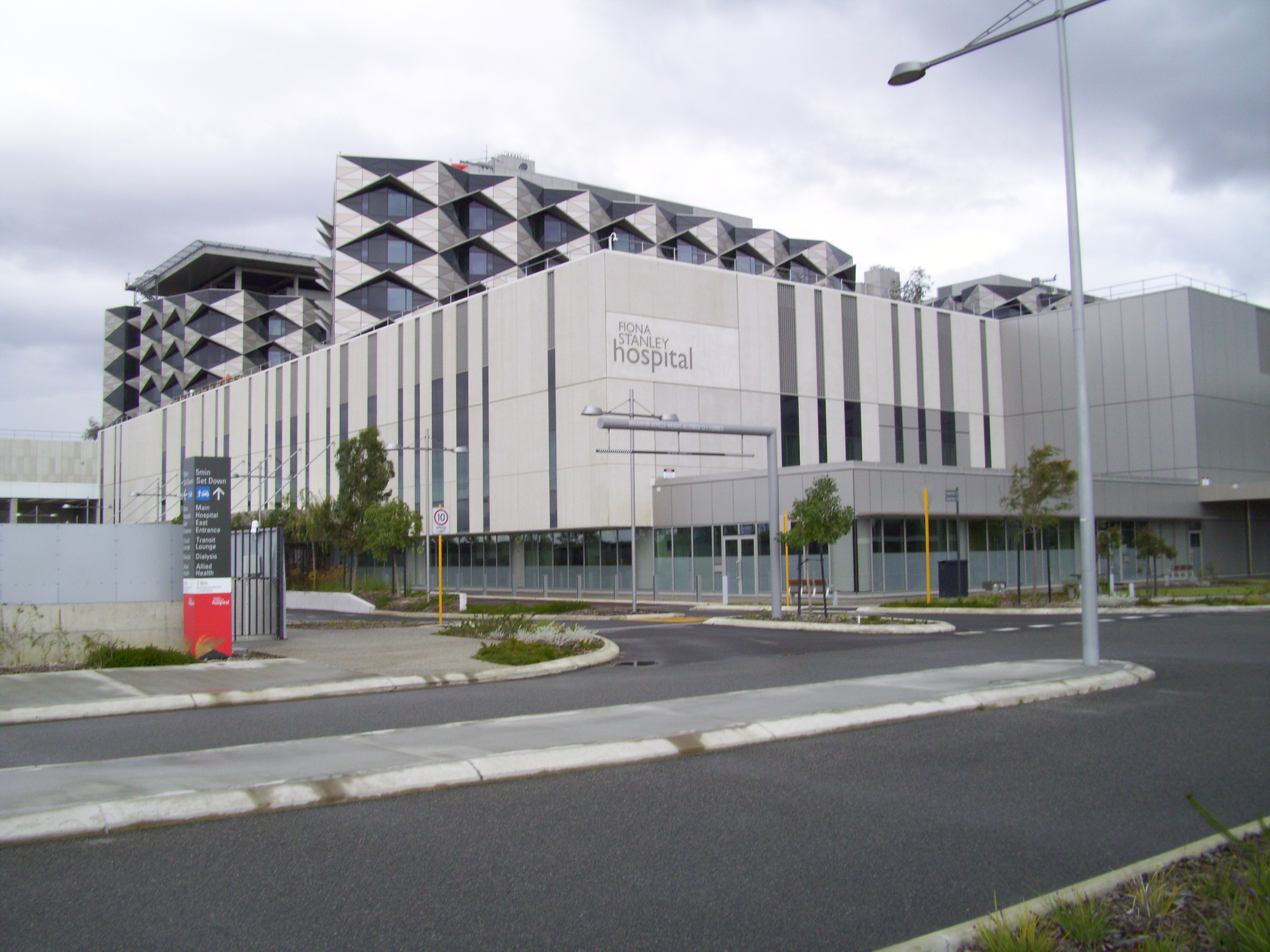
View from north-east

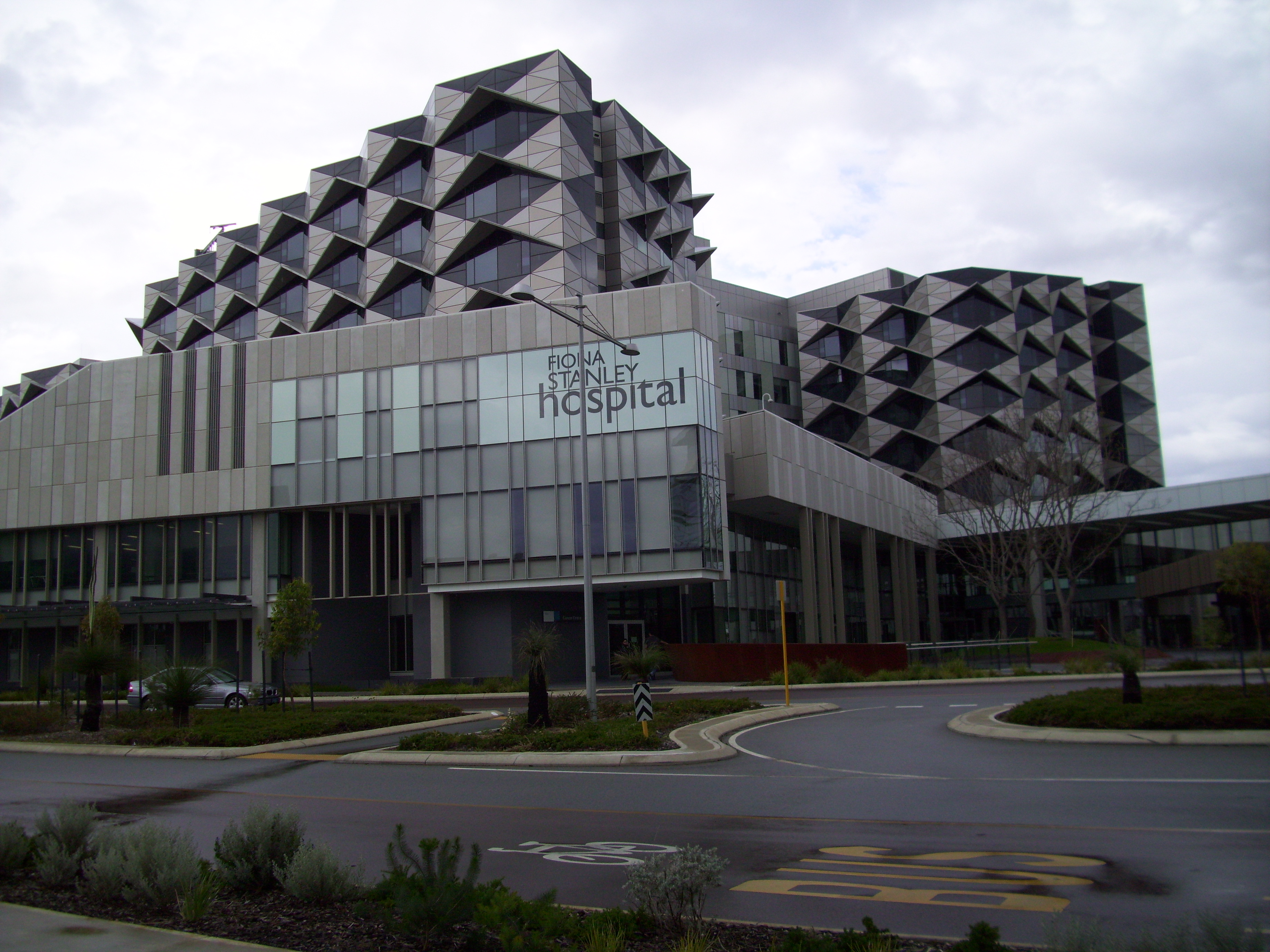
View from north-west

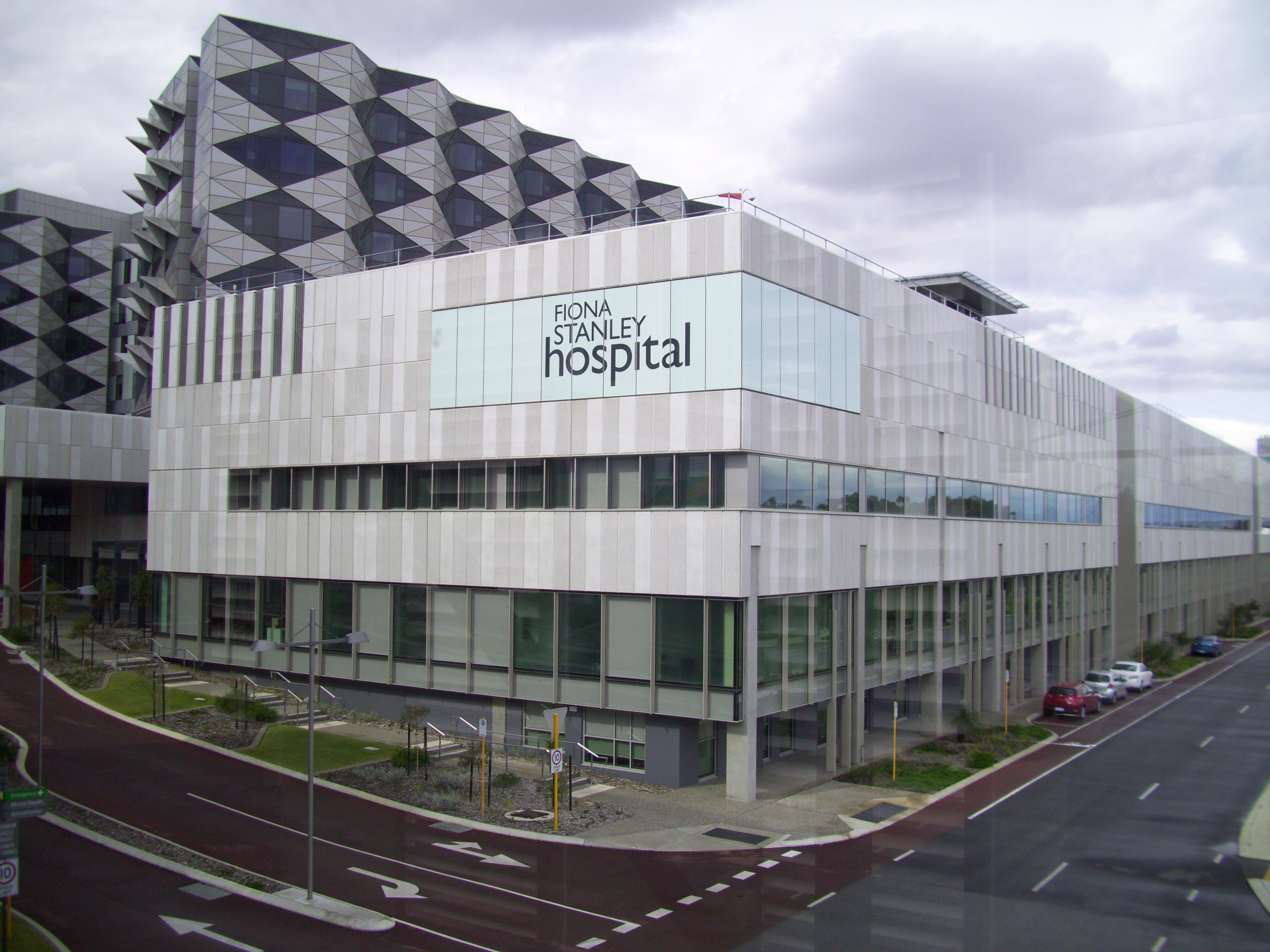
View from south-west

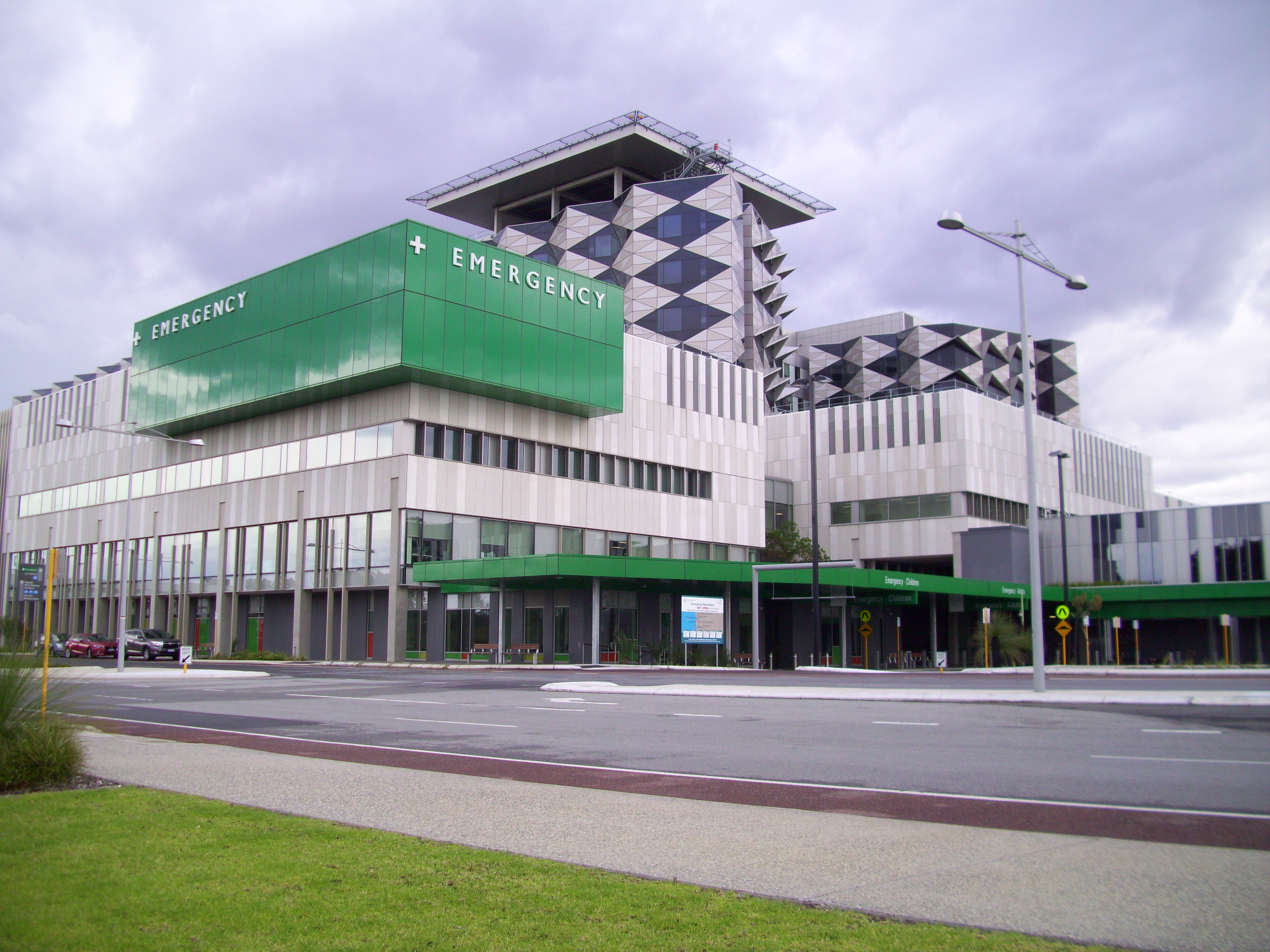
View from south-east

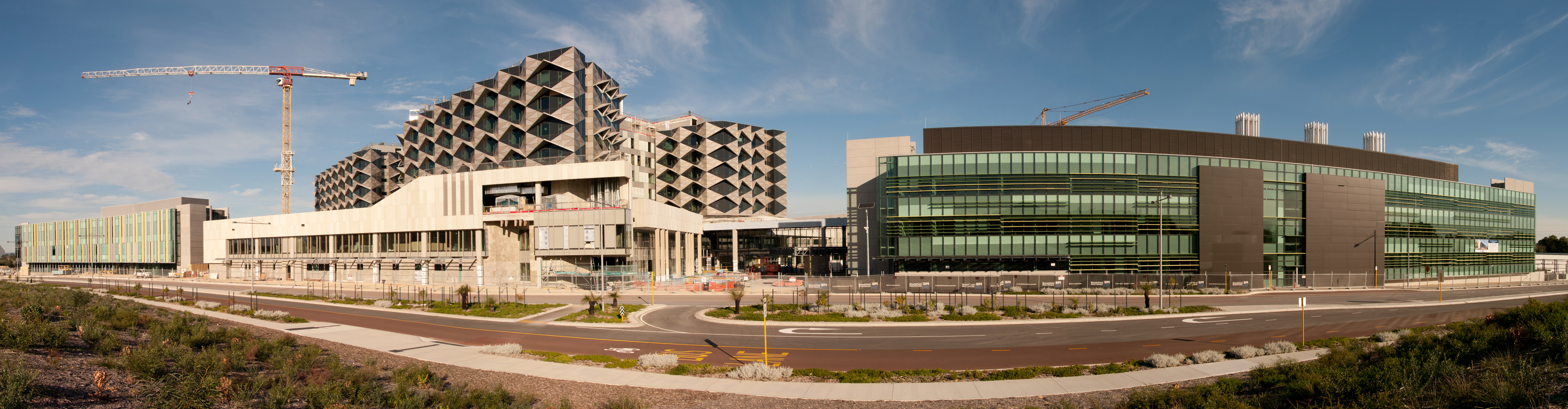
Panorama of the construction of the hospital, May 2012

== Awards ==
In July 2015, the West Australian chapter of the Australian Institute of Architects awarded the Fiona Stanley Hospital Design Collaboration (comprising architectural practices Silver Thomas Hanley, Hames Sharley and Hassell) the following awards and commendations:

- The George Temple-Poole Award (the program's highest overall honour)
- The Jeffrey Howlett Award for Best Public Architecture
- The Wallace Greenham Award Best Sustainable Architecture
- A Commendation for Urban Design

== Controversy ==
Throughout its construction phase, Fiona Stanley Hospital was originally planned to be a "paperless" hospital, thus meaning all the information is stored within computers. This idea was abandoned shortly after.

A number of medication errors were reported in 2016. A 41-year-old man died after suffering avoidable side-effects of a medication to treat his inflammatory bowel disease. Another patient suffered a catastrophic aneurysm after a medication to treat low blood pressure was inadvertently given in too high dose.

Fiona Stanley has also been criticised for sanitary standards of operating theatres. In 2016 a patient contracted hepatitis C after undergoing a procedure immediately following a patient with that disease.

== See also ==
- List of hospitals in Western Australia
- List of hospitals in Australia
