= St John of God Geraldton Hospital =

Hospital in Geraldton, Western Australia

- St John of God Health Care

Geography
- Location: Geraldton, City of Greater Geraldton, Western Australia, Australia
- Coordinates: 28°47′03″S 114°36′57″E

Organisation
- Type: General
- Religious affiliation: Catholic Church

Services
- Beds: 60

History
- Opened: 1935; 91 years ago

Links
- Website: www.sjog.org.au/our-locations/st-john-of-god-geraldton-hospital
- Lists: Hospitals in Australia

St John of God Hospital Geraldton is a 60-bed private hospital providing health care to Geraldton and the Mid West of Western Australia.

Established in 1935, the hospital first opened as a 28-bed facility and underwent major renovations in 1969. In 1980, the community raised $1.6 million towards building a new hospital, which opened in 1992.

St John of God Geraldton Hospital is a division of St John of God Health Care, a leading Catholic not-for-profit health care group, serving communities with hospitals, home nursing, and social outreach services throughout Australia, New Zealand and the wider Asia-Pacific region.

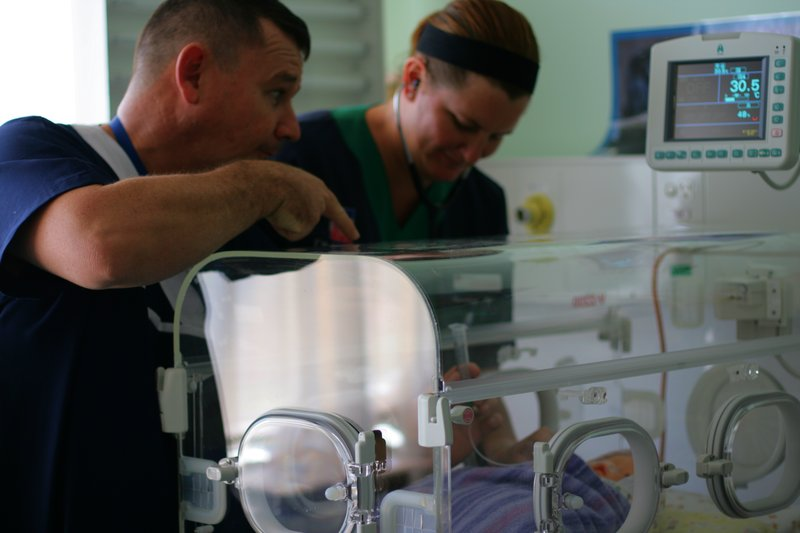
BLW Vocational nurse training at Geraldton

== Facilities ==
St John of God Hospital Geraldton houses two operating theatres, one procedure room and a range of onsite diagnostic services, including medical imaging and pathology.

The hospital also operates a Specialist Medical Centre that provides facilities for permanent and visiting medical practitioners, encompassing a range of medical specialties.

== Services ==
The hospital provides health care to Geraldton and surrounding communities, on an inpatient and outpatient basis. Services provided by the facility include:

- Maternity
- General surgery
- General medical
- Orthopaedic surgery
- Palliative care
- Outpatient services

The hospital does not provide emergency services.

== Social outreach ==
St John of God Hospital Geraldton runs a number of social outreach programs, including:

- St John of God Horizon House program in Geraldton provides safe, stable accommodation and support vulnerable young people aged 16–22 years who are currently experiencing, or are at serious risk, of homelessness. The program supports young people to access education, training and employment opportunities and make the transition to independent living.
- Centacare Young Mum’s Group – support groups for young mothers
- Indigenous scholarships – two annual scholarships to indigenous students studying either registered or enrolled nursing
- Red Cross soup program – the hospital is part of the Red Cross and Suncity Christian Centre Soup Program

== See also ==
- List of hospitals in Australia
