= Rottnest Island Nursing Post =

Hospital in Perth

- Fiona Stanley Hospital

Geography
- Location: 2 Abbott St, Rottnest Island WA 6161, Australia, Western Australia, Australia
- Coordinates: 31°59′37.4″S 115°32′23.1″E

History
- Former name: Rottnest Island Hospital

Links
- Lists: Hospitals in Australia

The Rottnest Island Nursing Post, formerly known as the Rottnest Island Hospital, is a public hospital on Rottnest Island, Western Australia. It operates as a branch of Fiona Stanley Hospital; being staffed by nurses, managers and specialists, but relying on administrative support from the main hospital.

The nursing post provides services such as retrieval, referral to specialists, x-ray examinations, pharmaceuticals, and pathology collection. It has the facilities to attend to 30 patients per day, operating 24 hours per day.

In the past, the nursing post has dealt with quokka and snake bites.
