= St John of God Bunbury Hospital =

Hospital in Bunbury, Western Australia

- St John of God Health Care

Geography
- Location: Bunbury, City of Bunbury, Western Australia, Australia
- Coordinates: 33°22′06″S 115°38′53″E

Organisation
- Type: General
- Religious affiliation: Catholic Church

Services
- Beds: 145

History
- Opened: 1927; 99 years ago

Links
- Website: www.sjog.org.au/our-locations/st-john-of-god-bunbury-hospital
- Lists: Hospitals in Australia

St John of God Bunbury Hospital is a 145-bed private hospital providing health care to the south west of Western Australia.

The hospital was established in 1927 in Bunbury as a branch of St John of God Hospital in Perth, and in 1940 was established as an independent hospital in a new building. The hospital relocated to the South West Health Campus in 1999. It is now collocated with the public Bunbury Regional Hospital.

St John of God Bunbury Hospital is a division of St John of God Health Care, a Catholic not-for-profit health care group.

== Facilities ==
Facilities include 145 inpatient beds, five operating suites, a cardiac interventional laboratory, a birthing suite and maternity ward, acute medical/surgical wards, a high dependency unit, a day procedure unit, palliative care wing and hydrotherapy pool.

In 2011, St John of God Bunbury Hospital began construction on a $35.9 million redevelopment, which includes a Comprehensive Cancer Centre, Coronary Care unit, and an accommodation and transport service for regional cancer patients. The coronary care unit opened in January 2013 and the cancer centre opened in May of the same year. The cancer centre includes cancer consultant suites, on-site breast screening, expanded cancer imaging and therapeutic services, as well as research and teaching facilities.

== Services ==
Services offered by St John of God Bunbury Hospital include:

- Cardiac services
- Interventional cardiology
- Cancer treatment
- Renal dialysis
- Elective surgery
- General medicine
- Palliative care
- Maternity, obstetrics and gynaecology
- Allied health
- Drug and alcohol services

The hospital operates outreach services for vulnerable populations. Based in Bunbury, the South West Community Alcohol and Drug Service Team aims to reduce the harm associated with the use of alcohol and other drugs in the South West region of Western Australia. The hospital's Horizon House program provides safe, stable accommodation and supports vulnerable young people aged 16-22 years who are currently experiencing, or are at serious risk, of homelessness. The program helps young people access education, training and employment opportunities and make the transition to independent living.
