= St John of God Geelong Hospital =

- St John of God Health Care
- Myers Street entrance to the hospital

Geography
- Location: Geelong, Victoria, Australia
- Coordinates: 38°09′05″S 144°21′28″E

Organisation
- Type: General

Services
- Beds: 252

History
- Former name: Holy Cross Hospital
- Founded: 1965

Links
- Website: www.sjog.org.au/hospitals/geelong.aspx
- Lists: Hospitals in Australia

St John of God Geelong Hospital is a 284-bed hospital providing inpatient and outpatient care in the Barwon and south-west regions of Victoria.

Founded in 1965, the Sisters of St John of God purchased the hospital in 1977 and it was renamed from Holy Cross Hospital to St John of God Geelong Hospital in 1980.

St John of God Geelong Hospital is a division of St John of God Health Care, a Catholic not-for-profit health care group.

== Redevelopment ==
In 2012, St John of God Geelong Hospital began construction on a $64.6 million redevelopment which includes the addition of 64 new beds.

The redevelopment, which finished in 2014, included the addition of 64 new beds, the establishment of an emergency facility and rehabilitation service, three new operating theatres, new nurse units for oncology, palliative care and orthopedic services, an education and training centre, and additional car-parking.

A second $21 million redevelopment finished in 2017 adding three operating theatres, a hydrotherapy pool and rehabilitation centre, angiography suite and new chapel. In 2017, the hospital’s new intensive care unit opened.

In 2020, the hospital's Emergency Department opened 24/7 becoming the first private emergency department to open 24/7 in the region.

== Social outreach ==
St John of God Raphael Services in Geelong provides perinatal infant mental health care and research. Staffed by mental health clinicians, Raphael Services provide free support for parents and families affected by anxiety, depression and other mental health difficulties during pregnancy and in the postnatal period. The services also provide counselling and support for parents undergoing prenatal testing or who have experienced pregnancy loss.

St John of God Horizon House program in Geelong provides safe, stable accommodation and support vulnerable young people aged 16–22 years who are currently experiencing, or are at serious risk, of homelessness. The program supports young people to access education, training and employment opportunities and make the transition to independent living.

== History ==
=== 1965: Construction and Opening ===
The four-level, 80-bed facility opened under the name Holy Cross Hospital in 1965, administered by the RC Missionary Sisters of the Sacred Heart. Construction and equipment cost A£750,000 (A$1.5m), the building designed by Buchan, Laird & Buchan (now the Buchan Group – a multinational architecture firm which originated in Geelong). The original configuration featured medical, surgical, obstetric and paediatric departments.

=== 1974 ===
In 1974, due to financial and administrative difficulties faced by the MSC order, the hospital was to be sold. The local RC church acted to keep it by inviting another order, the Sisters of St John of God to take over its administration. The name of the hospital was not changed at this time, remaining as Holy Cross.

=== 1977 ===
The Sisters of St John of God purchased the hospital from the Missionary Sisters of the Most Sacred Heart (MSC Sisters) in 1977.

=== 1980 ===
The name of the hospital was officially changed from the Holy Cross Hospital to St John of God Geelong Hospital in 1980.

The Missionary Sisters of the Most Sacred Heart partnered with the Hospital Auxiliary to build a new 81-bed hospital.

=== 1989 ===
The Sisters handed over the management of the hospital to lay caregivers in 1989.

=== Further developments ===
- In 1988, plans to increase bed capacity and services was realised with the completion of the east wing which added four new operating theatres and three levels of patient accommodation.
- A west wing was added in 1997, along with 60 additional beds, upgrades to maternity facilities and new medical consulting suites.
- The Specialist Centre on Myer Street was completed in 2009, adding day surgery services and specialist consulting suites.
- The development of the six storey Granada Medical Centre, an emergency department, three new operating theatres and a hydrotherapy centre, was completed in 2014.
- In 2017 a new eight bed intensive care unit was opened the cardiac care unit will be expanded and upgraded.

== See also ==
- Missionary Sisters of the Sacred Heart
