= Swan District Hospital =

Former hospital in Perth, Western Australia

Geography
- Location: Eveline Road, Middle Swan, City of Swan, Western Australia, Australia
- Coordinates: 31°53′S 116°01′E

Organisation
- Type: General

Services
- Emergency department: Yes
- Beds: 193

History
- Founded: September 22, 1951; 74 years ago
- Closed: November 24, 2015; 10 years ago

Links
- Lists: Hospitals in Australia

The former Swan District Hospital was a general public hospital in Middle Swan, in Perth's north-eastern suburbs. The hospital had an emergency department, 193 beds, and also provided outpatient services. It closed on 24 November 2015 following the opening of the Midland Health Campus.

== History ==
Construction of the Swan District Hospital was being considered in 1951.

It was opened on 22 September 1954 by the Minister for Health, Emil Nulsen, as a 25-bed maternity hospital. A hospital in the Midland area had previously been requested in the 1930s. The hospital expanded with the addition of a 40-bed general wing that opened 18 October 1963. A second general wing, that also included new X-ray facilities and a nursing aide training school, opened on 20 August 1971. The Swan Valley Centre, a 25-bed mental health unit, opened in early 2001.

== Closure ==
Swan District Hospital closed following the opening of the new Midland Health Campus on 24 November 2015. In September 2015, it was reported that all health services at the site except the dental clinic would cease when the main hospital closed. Kim Hames, then the state Health Minister, stated that the hospital site may be sold to pay down state debt. The site was handed to the Department of Lands in March 2016.
