= St John of God Health Care =

Catholic not-for-profit private hospital group in Australia

St John of God Health Care is a not for profit, Catholic provider of health care services in Australia, with 25 hospitals and facilities comprising more than 3,200 beds. The group operates in Western Australia, New South Wales, Victoria, and New Zealand.

The group has evolved out of the Brothers Hospitallers of Saint John of God, a Catholic order.

== History ==
The congregation of the Sisters of St John of God was founded in 1871 in Wexford, Ireland. In 1895, Perth's Bishop Matthew Gibney sent a request to the Sisters for help to care for people suffering from typhoid fever during the 1890s gold rush. The first hospital established under this arrangement was at Kalgoorlie in the late 1890s followed shortly by another in the Perth suburb of Subiaco.

The Sisters often cared for patients with infectious diseases including typhoid and Hansen's disease (leprosy), which spread quickly in crowded mining camps. In 1937, after much lobbying by Sister Mary Gertrude, the order established a hospital for Aboriginal Australian patients with Hansen's disease, outside of Derby.

The Sisters of St John of God went on to establish additional hospitals, pathology and social outreach services in Western Australia, Victoria and New South Wales.

In 2007, St John of God Health Care merged with the services previously operated by the Hospitaller Order of St John of God in Victoria, New South Wales and New Zealand.

In 2015, St John of God Health Care expanded into public health care and took ownership of Hawkesbury District Health Service and opened St John of God Midland Public and Private Hospitals.

In May 2025, the Sisters of St John of God announced plans to close the Sisters of St John of God Heritage Centre in Broome, Western Australia. The former convent has operated as a museum and archive since 1995, and many Aboriginal families with links to the area are concerned about what will happen to the historical photos and documents, many of which could be the only copies of such documentation in existence. As a result of being a privately owned collection, these documents and photographs are not protected by state legislation and as a result, could technically be destroyed without recourse available to family members and descendants of the Stolen Generations survivors. The Sisters of St John of God have long had links to the Broome area, having arrived at La Grange Mission (also known as Bidyadanga), 200 km south of Broome in 1957 to teach the children living in the mission. At the time the Sisters of St John of God arrived to La Grange, Missions continued to house Aboriginal children and young people, most of whom had been forcibly removed from their families for the purpose severing ties to family, language and culture under the guise of protection.

== Pomegranate symbol ==
The symbol used by St John of God Health Care is a cross with a pomegranate. The cross symbolises the Christian heritage of the organisation; the pomegranate, which is open to allow the seeds to scatter, symbolises self-giving and represents the organisation's values.

The pomegranate symbol was chosen by the Sisters of St John of God to reflect the order's patron Saint, John of God, who ministered to the sick and poor in the Spanish town of Granada – ‘pomegranate’ in Spanish – in the early 16th century.

== Services ==
St John of God Health Care operates private and public hospitals, as well as disability, home nursing and social outreach services.

== Locations ==
St John of God operates 13 medical/surgical hospitals, one rehabilitation hospital, three psychiatric hospitals, three day hospitals and one oncology centre across Australia. It also operates home nursing services in Western Australia and Victoria, social outreach services in Western Australia, New South Wales and Victoria and supported residential facilities for people living with a disability in Victoria and New Zealand.

=== Australia ===
==== New South Wales ====
- St John of God Burwood Hospital
- St John of God Richmond Hospital
- Hawkesbury District Health Service: established in 1996, Hawkesbury District Health Service replaced the old Hawkesbury Hospital which was built in 1955. In 2015, St John of God Health Care acquired the Hawkesbury District Health Service from Catholic Healthcare. As of 2018 the facility has 131 beds and three operating theatres. Its cancer care unit opened in 2017.

==== Victoria ====
- St John of God Ballarat Hospital
- St John of God Bendigo Hospital
- St John of God Berwick Hospital
- St John of God Geelong Hospital
- St John of God Warrnambool Hospital
- St John of God Langmore Centre
- St John of God Frankston Rehabilitation Hospital

==== Western Australia ====
- St John of God Bunbury Hospital
- St John of God Geraldton Hospital
- St John of God Midland Public and Private Hospitals
- St John of God Murdoch Hospital and Surgicentre
- St John of God Subiaco Hospital
- St John of God Wembley Day Surgery
- St John of God Carine Specialist Centre

=== New Zealand ===
- St John of God Halswell – a 51-bed facility residential and respite support service and three community homes for people with acquired brain injuries, physical and neurological disabilities.
- St John of God Wellington – a 36-bed residential care facility for people with physical disabilities.

== Social outreach ==
The system operates a number of social outreach and community programs to support disadvantaged and vulnerable communities, including:

- St John of God Accord – disability support services including day respite, to group housing and employment support.
- St John of God Horizon Houses – accommodation and support in WA and Victoria for people aged 16–22 at risk of homelessness.
- St John of God Raphael Services – early intervention counselling, therapy and support for parents from conception through to their child's fourth year. Services are located in Victoria, WA and NSW.
- International health programs – aimed at raising the capacity of healthcare workforces in Timor-Leste, Papua New Guinea and the Kingdom of Tonga.
- St John of God Casa Venegas – accommodation and support in Sydney for people with enduring mental illness.
- Community mental health services – in regional Victoria and Perth, WA, providing individually tailoring counselling at low or no cost.
- Waipuna – a youth service in Christchurch, New Zealand.

== Home nursing ==
St John of God Health Choices, a division of St John of God Health Care, provides home nursing services in the Australian states of Victoria and Western Australia. Health Choices has bases in Ballarat, Bendigo, Berwick, Geelong, Melbourne, Subiaco and Warrnambool.

In 2009, Health Choices was created as a separate division to provide home nursing in sites where it had not existed before.

In May 2010, St John of God Health Choices acquired Melbourne-based nursing provider M&M HealthPower.

St John of God Health Care is a provider of community nursing services on behalf of the Department of Veterans Affairs. The Health Choices service is free for veterans and people with private health cover.

== The St John of God Foundation ==
The fundraising arm of St John of God Health Care is the St John of God Foundation, established in 1994 by the Sisters of St John of God. In February 2010, the Foundation was integrated into St John of God Health Care.

The Foundation raises funds to support medical research, life-changing medical equipment and person-centred treatment in response to the needs of people and communities that are not met by traditional means or government funding.

== See also ==
- List of hospitals in Australia
- List of hospitals in New Zealand
