= Department of Health (Western Australia) =

Department of Health Western Australia

Agency overview
- Jurisdiction: Government of Western Australia
- Employees: 44,000
- Agency executive: Dr Shirley Bowen, Director General
- Website: www.health.wa.gov.au

The Department of Health is a Western Australian government department responsible for regulating and advancing health within the state. It manages a system of multiple Health Service Providers (HSPs) which make up Western Australia's public health system, and is collectively referred to as WA Health. WA Health covers a state which spans over 2.5 million square kilometres, making it the world's largest single health authority by area.

== History ==
The Public Health Department of Western Australia operated between 1911 and 1984. It merged with Mental Health Services and the Department of Hospital and Allied Services in July 1984, to become the Health Department of Western Australia. In September 2001, it was renamed to the Department of Health.

== Preceding agencies ==
- Medical Department, 1 January 1850 – 1 October 1906
- Central Board of Health, 17 November 1886 – 31 May 1911
- Public Health Department of Western Australia, 1 June 1911 – 30 June 1984
- Department of Hospital and Allied Services, 30 April 1981 – 30 June 1984

== See also ==
- List of hospitals in Western Australia
