= Calvary Hospital =

Calvary Hospital may refer to:

- Calvary Hospital, Bronx, a non profit institution in the borough of The Bronx in New York City
- Calvary Hospital, Hobart, located in Lenah Valley, Tasmania
- Calvary Hospital, Canberra, located in Bruce, Australian Capital Territory
- Calvary Hospital, Wagga Wagga, located in Wagga Wagga, New South Wales
- Calvary North Adelaide Hospital, located in North Adelaide, South Australia
- Calvary Wakefield Hospital, located in Adelaide, Australia
