= Norah Martin =

Mother superior and hospital nurse (1888–1977)

Norah Martin OBE

Personal life
- Born: Norah Margaret Martin; 18 June 1888 Booligal, New South Wales, Australia
- Died: 25 August 1977 (aged 89) Ryde, New South Wales, Australia
- Known for: Superior-general

Religious life
- Religion: Christianity (Catholic)
- Order: The Little Company of Mary
- Monastic name: Mother Mary Bernard

Norah Margaret Martin OBE (1888–1977), later known by her religious name Mother Mary Bernard, was an Australian religious sister and the superior general of the Little Company of Mary, an order of religious who care for the ill. She served as superior general for 12 years, from 1947 to 1959. She also served as provincial superior for the New Zealand and the Australian provinces. She was a skilled nurse and served as superior for several of the order's hospitals. She initiated the effort that eventually led to the beatification of Mary Potter, the founder of her order.

== Early life ==
Norah Margaret Martin was born on 18 June 1888 in the rural community of Box Creek near Booligal in New South Wales, Australia. Her parents, Patrick and Mary Martin, had immigrated to Australia from Ireland. Her father worked as a grazier, responsible for the care of livestock. The couple had six children, of whom Norah was the youngest. She was educated by the Sisters of St Joseph of the Sacred Heart at their convent school in Hillston. After her father died in 1901, Martin left school to assist her mother at home. The family moved to Sydney in 1905.

== Religious life ==
At age 20, Martin decided to enter the religious life and in 1908 became a postulant with the Sisters of the Little Company of Mary in Lewisham, Sydney, New South Wales. Founded by the Venerable Mary Potter in Nottingham, England, the Little Company of Mary was a religious order dedicated to nursing the ill and dying. The Australian congregation has been established in 1885. The sisters were known affectionately as the "Blue Sisters" because of their distinctive blue habit. Martin took on the religious name of "Mary Bernard" and professed her final vows on 6 August 1912.

Martin trained as a nurse at Lewisham Hospital, working in operating theatres. She became a member of the Australasian Trained Nurses' Association, the first nurses association in Australia. She passed their qualifying examination in 1913. She worked in the Little Company of Mary hospital in Christchurch, New Zealand, from 1917 to 1929.

In 1929, Mother Mary Xavier Lynch, the provincial superior for Australasia, retired. Martin was appointed her successor. She was provincial superior for six years. From 1935 to 1941, she served as the superior of Lewisham Hospital. She served a second term as provincial supervisor for Australasia from 1941 to 1947.

In 1947, in recognition of her leadership skills, Martin was elected superior general of the Sisters of the Little Company of Mary. The election was held at the mother house in Rome. As superior general, Martin was responsible for managing the affairs of the entire order; she was the first Australian to be chosen for this role. According to the Australian Dictionary of Biography, she may have been the first Australian woman to lead an international religious order.

Martin travelled widely to visit the provinces of her order. She toured Australia as mother superior in 1953. During World War II, she closed the novitiate house in Rome, but reopened it after the war ended. Despite the challenges of managing the order during wartime, she oversaw the addition of 15 new hospitals worldwide. While superior general, she also initiated a movement for the beatification of Mary Potter, the founder of her order. Potter was declared venerable in 1988 by Pope John Paul II; efforts are still underway to support her being recognised as a saint in the Catholic Church.

After serving as superior general for 12 years, Martin stepped down and returned to Australia. She oversaw the management of the Mount St Margaret Hospital as superior from 1959 to 1965. She was then appointed to serve as provincial superior for New Zealand.

== Later life ==
Martin retired in 1969.

She was appointed Officer of the British Empire in the 1969 Birthday Honours (New Zealand) for "services to the nursing profession".

On 25 August 1977, Martin died at the Mount St Margaret Hospital in Ryde where she had once served as superior. She is buried in the Rookwood cemetery.

== See also ==
- Little Company of Mary Healthcare (Australia)
- Nursing in Australia
