= Healthscope =

Private healthcare provider in Australia

- Type: Subsidiary
- Industry: Healthcare
- Founded: 1985; 41 years ago
- Defunct: 30 November 2026
- Fate: Receivership; Assets to be acquired by Calvary-led group and broken up
- Headquarters: 312 St Kilda Road, Melbourne, Australia
- Key people: Nicole Waldron (Interim CEO)
- Services: Private healthcare
- Divisions: Hospitals, Mental Health Clinics, Rehabilitation Centres
- Website: healthscope.com.au

Healthscope was a for-profit, American-owned Australian company which operates private hospitals and medical centres, as well as a number of psychiatric and rehabilitation hospitals. The company is headquartered on St Kilda Road, Melbourne.

In 2025, it was placed into receivership by lenders over A$1.6 billion in debt. McGrathNicol was appointed receivers-and-managers and KordaMentha were appointed administrators, with a further $100 million injected into the receivership by Commonwealth Bank to keep operations going.

In the following years, the receivers broke up the company, culminating in an effective bidding war between two forms, with one being not-for-profit seen as to rely on tax breaks to save the company at the expense of taxpayers and creditors. The Calvary Health structure won in the end and receivers announced the remaining hospitals will be split up into four operators.

== History ==
Healthscope is a private healthcare provider in Australia with 40 hospitals.

Formed in 1985, the Healthscope Group has a long history in the private health care industry, and was initially listed on the Australian Securities Exchange (ASX) in 1994.

In October 2010, the Healthscope business was acquired by a consortium of funds, advised and managed by TPG Capital and The Carlyle Group and was subsequently de-listed from the ASX. Following a period of successful growth under private ownership, the Healthscope business was re-listed on the ASX on 28 July 2014.

In July 2015, Healthscope sold its Australian Pathology division to Crescent Capital Partners.

In August 2017, Healthscope sold their Medical Centres portfolio to Singapore-based Fullerton Healthcare.

On 6 June 2019, Canadian firm Brookfield Business Partners announced completion of its takeover of Healthscope. Brookfield partnered with institutional investors including the Caisse de dépôt et placement du Québec, and the CDPQ maintains a minority stake in Healthscope.

On 16 March 2026, Healthscope announced that Tino La Spina had ceased as Chief Executive Officer, with Chief Operating Officer Nicole Waldron appointed Interim Chief Executive Officer.

On 26 May 2025, Healthscope went into receivership after its lenders voted to end their support for Brookfield, which had been unable to pay to keep facilities open. McGrathNicol were appointed receivers, with the Commonwealth Bank and Westpac, two of the lenders owed $1.6 billion. It comes during debate on whether the NSW Government should take over hospitals in NSW, and after recent critical failures such as the death of the two-year-old son of Elouise Massa who says the administration should stop 'the private equity firm Brookfield [from profiting from] the care of sick and injured Australians', and the bungled recovery and death from anaphylaxis of 17-year-old walk-in James Tsindos. KordaMentha were appointed administrators and Commonwealth Bank has injected an extra $100 million to keep the hospitals afloat, with assurances that the hospitals will run as per usual with no redundancies and pauses at this stage and only the ownership has collapsed.

In 2026, receivers began to break up the company, with a not-for-profit among major bidders to take on the company's assets; 28 hospitals will be operated by Calvary Health. In April 2026, Northern Beaches Hospital was transferred from founding PPP to public hands by the NSW Government, following increasing pressure compounded by the operator's collapse.

In August 2026, it was revealed the receivers are in a bidding war between a proposed not-for-profit structure PurposeCo and a consortium of landlords and Calvary, weighing up a 2-year-long though higher return on investment as a not-for-profit and fierce opposition by private landlords.

Australian Managing director of major landlord Northwest Healthcare Richard Roos expressed regrets over a leaseback property deal with then-newly-heavily-debt-laden Healthscope in 2018, and expresses confidence in winning the ballot, as PurposeCo is being called an "interesting" construct to rely on charitable tax breaks to turn the business around at the expense of taxpayers.

On 14 September, it was announced the Calvary consortium won the bid, and that the company will be split between at least 4 operators, Calvary Health, Healthe Care, ACURIO and KnG Group. Creditors are expected to receive 40c to the dollar, as the consortium had to raise its bid to gain support.

The sale has sparked fears that Calvary will not honour gender-affirming care, abortion, IVF or contraception in Hobart Private Hospital. Tasmanian health minister Bridget Archer says she will make sure that Tasmania will not lose access to such services, whether it will be negotiations with Calvary or a private health system in the public health system.

=== Ownership ===
Healthscope was a public company whose stock was traded on the Australian Securities Exchange under the stock code HSP. The company completed an initial public offering in 1994 when it raised A$70 million by issuing 40 million shares at A$1.75 each. In 2010, Healthscope was acquired by the Carlyle Group. It was managed by TPG and the Carlyle Group and was later re-added to the ASX on 28 July 2014. From July 2014, Healthscope stock was again part of the S&P/ASX 200 Index under the stock code HSO. In June 2019, Healthscope was delisted again.

== Hospitals and facilities run by Healthscope ==
=== Hospitals ===
Healthscope operates and manages 36 private hospitals in Australia, which includes eleven mental health facilities, and six rehabilitation hospitals as well as managing 20 residential care houses through Healthscope Independence Services.

- Queensland
  - Brisbane Private Hospital
  - Peninsula Private Hospital
  - Pine Rivers Private Hospital
  - Sunnybank Private Hospital
- New South Wales
  - Campbelltown Private Hospital
  - Lady Davidson Private Hospital
  - Hunter Valley Private Hospital
  - Nepean Private Hospital
  - Newcastle Private Hospital
  - Norwest Private Hospital
  - Prince of Wales Private Hospital
  - Sydney Southwest Private Hospital
  - The Hills Private Hospital
  - The Sydney Clinic
- Australian Capital Territory
  - National Capital Private Hospital
- Victoria
  - Dorset Rehabilitation Centre
  - Holmesglen Private Hospital
  - John Fawkner Private Hospital
  - Knox Private Hospital
  - La Trobe Private Hospital
  - Melbourne Private Hospital
  - North Eastern Rehabilitation Centre
  - Northpark Private Hospital
  - Ringwood Private Hospital
  - The Geelong Clinic
  - The Melbourne Clinic
  - The Victoria Clinic
  - The Victorian Rehabilitation Centre
- Tasmania
  - Hobart Private Hospital
- South Australia
  - Adelaide Community Healthcare Alliance
    - Ashford Hospital
    - Flinders Private Hospital
    - The Memorial Hospital
    - Griffith Rehabilitation Hospital
- Western Australia
  - Mount Hospital
- Northern Territory
  - Darwin Private Hospital

=== Former Healthscope Hospitals ===
The following hospitals were previously part of the Healthscope network and have since been sold, closed or transitioned to new ownership.

- Pacific Private Hospital (Transitioned to Nexus in 2022)
- Gold Coast Private Hospital (previously Allamanda Private Hospital - Transitioned to Mater ownership on 1 August 2026)
- Northern Beaches Private Hospital (Transitioned from PPP to Public ownership 29 April 2026)
- Tweed Day Surgery (Site reverted to Day Hospital Partners 1 October 2025)
- Geelong Private Hospital (Closed: site reverted to Barwon Health)
- Bellbird Private Hospital (site reverted to Eastern Health October 2022)
- Frankston Private Hospital (site reverted to Peninsula Health 1 Sep 2022)
- St Helen's Private Hospital (Mental Health facility) (Closed 23 June 2023)
- Parkwynd Private Hospital (Closed in April 2021)

=== Mental Health Services ===
Healthscope Hospitals is the largest operator of private inpatient mental health facilities in Australia with 11 hospitals providing care. Healthscope Hospitals provide treatment for mental health issues and for substance use disorders.

Healthscope Hospitals offering Mental Health Services

- Brisbane Private Hospital (Brisbane, Qld)
- Campbelltown Private Hospital (Campbelltown, NSW)
- Northpark Private Hospital (Bundoora, Vic)
- Pine Rivers Private Hospital (Strathpine, Qld)
- Sydney Southwest Private Hospital (Liverpool, NSW)
- The Geelong Clinic (Geelong, Vic)
- The Hills Private Hospital (Baulkham Hills, NSW)
- The Melbourne Clinic (Richmond, Vic)
- The Sydney Clinic (Randwick, NSW)
- The Victoria Clinic (Prahran, Vic)
- The Darwin Clinic (Darwin, NT)

The programs available at Healthscope Hospitals include:

- Mood & Anxiety Disorders
- Eating Disorders
- Addiction Services
- Post Traumatic Stress Disorder (PTSD)
- Personality Disorders
- Aged Psychiatry
- Psychosis Obsessive Compulsive Disorder (OCD)
- Postnatal Depression
- Innovative Treatments for Depression (TMS)

Former Healthscope Mental Health Hospital

- St Helen's Private Hospital (Hobart) - (Closed in 2023)

=== Rehabilitation Services ===
Healthscope Hospitals offering Rehabilitation Services

- Brisbane Private Hospital (Brisbane, Qld)
- Campbelltown Private Hospital (Campbelltown, NSW)
- Darwin Private Hospital (Darwin, NT)
- Dorset Rehabilitation Centre (Pascoe Vale, Vic)
- Geelong Private Hospital (Geelong, Vic)
- Griffith Rehabilitation Hospital (Hove, SA)
- Gold Coast Private Hospital (Southport, Qld)
- Hobart Private Hospital (Hobart, Tas)
- Hunter Valley Private Hospital (Newcastle, NSW)
- Lady Davidson Private Hospital (North Turramurra, NSW)
- Mount Hospital (Perth, WA)
- National Capital Private Hospital (Canberra, ACT)
- Newcastle Private Hospital (Newcastle, NSW)
- North Eastern Rehabilitation Centre (Ivanhoe, Vic)
- Peninsula Private Hospital (Kippa-Ring, Qld)
- Sunnybank Private Hospital (Sunnybank, Qld)
- The Hills Private Hospital (Baulkham Hills, NSW)
- The Victorian Rehabilitation Centre (Glen Waverley, Vic)

=== Healthscope Pathology ===
In July 2015, Healthscope sold its Australian Pathology business to Crescent Capital Partners. Healthscope sold its New Zealand pathology business in August 2020 to NZ Super.

=== Healthscope Medical Centres ===
In August 2017, Healthscope sold their Medical Centres division including a portfolio of 43 medical centres, four specialist skin clinics and one specialist breast diagnostic clinic to Fullerton Health Care.

=== Healthscope Independence Services ===
Healthscope Independence Services is a provider of unique accommodation, attendant care and in-home services to individuals with acquired brain injuries, other disabilities or complex conditions and others leaving hospital requiring extra support at home. Healthscope Independence Services provides long-term, short-term, transitional and respite options in metropolitan Melbourne, regional Victoria, New South Wales and Darwin in the Northern Territory.
