= Mary Moodie =

Mrs. Mary Madeline Sophia Moodie (QSO) (2 July 1926 – 25 October 1995) was a New Zealand foster care advocate and caregiver for disabled children in Christchurch, New Zealand.

== Biography ==
Mary grew up in the Wairarapa as one of six children alongside many foster brothers and sisters, because her parents had an 'open door' policy. She said her mother began fostering children in 1916.

Around 1951, in her early twenties, she began a career of fostering children herself. She had three of her own children with her husband, Stanley Edmond Middleton Moodie (1916 - 1992), and adopted two. The couple divorced in 1969, and Mary was known as a solo mother. She initially fostered children in her Sumner home, later moving to Redcliffs where her home Whakamarumaru was established.

In 1991, she set up and managed the Mary Moodie Trust, which was set up to provide 'quality care for physically and intellectually impaired children based on Christian principles', operating two foster homes in Sumner. From October 1995, just prior to her death, a respite home in Avonhead Road called The Mary Moodie Respite Care Centre was established for short stays by foster children.

Aged 69, Mary died on 25 November 1995, and a public memorial service was held at the South City Christian Centre on the corner of Moorhouse Avenue and Columbo Street in Christchurch on 9 November 1995. It was reported she had fostered 167 children over her 44-year career.

Talking to reporter Sue Lancaster in 1988, she outlined something of her experience in fostering:

"Everyone tells you 'I think you're wonderful' or 'I think you're a saint' when you're not. And it's so hard to live up to...either that, or they think you're in it for the money. I think I have made a lot of mistakes in the last 37 years, and even now, I still have a lot to learn...the minute you think you know it all in fostering, you should be out."

== Advocacy ==
Moodie was an active advocate for foster-parenting throughout her career. After a period as vice-president, she was the national president of the Foster Care Federation from 1990 to 1994, advocating for support for foster parents and ending the 'myths of fostering'. In this capacity she spoke against a 1992 Human Rights Commission report of children being beaten while in foster care in Christchurch, saying she had no knowledge of institutionalised child abuse in Christchurch, and 'I would be the one of the first to know'.

In May 1994, she was a consultant for the South Island Foster Care Federation, as it set up a working party to 'consider guidelines for foster parents who had suffered abuse from children in their care.' In September 1994, she was cited as a spokesperson for the Foster Care Federation, speaking on the way adolescents were becoming harder to foster because of their disturbed behaviour, so they needed a safe holding space and counselling.

== Whakamarumaru ==
After starting to foster in her home in Sumner, Mary set up a care home for disabled children in a large house in Redcliffs called Whakamarumaru, the Māori word for shelter. In 1984, it was run by Mary and her team, having been overseen by Presbyterian Support Services from 1976, and could accommodate 14 children. Here in 1978 she was also running an emergency day-care scheme for children in her neighbourhood.

Mary fostered children known as 'state wards' as well as privately fostered children here. She was an advocate for licencing all foster homes: in 1975 she noted that only those fostering children under the age of 6 were then needed to be licensed, as it was 'thought that after the child goes to school, the school will find out if anything is wrong at home'.

In 1985, Whakamarumaru was taken over from Presbyterian Support Services by I.H.C, as it had more specialised experience in working with disabled children.

Like other such homes in Christchurch, the residents of Whakamarumaru were the recipients of charitable aid, such as 'Operation Santa', run by the Waimari Lions Club, who delivered wrapped gifts to the children. In 1982 the home received $5000 from the New Zealand Lottery Board, for running costs, and in 1981 the Sutherland Self Help Trust granted it $4000 for renovation and furnishings.

In 1978, along with Louise Miles, Mary was considered by Maurice McGregor, Superintendent of Presbyterian Support Services as one of their two stalwarts of the care of disabled children in Christchurch.

== Awards ==
In 1992, Mary received the Paul Harris Fellowship by Rotary International, and in 1998 was named the Melvin Jones Fellow by the Lions Club International.

Mary received a Queen's Service Order medal in the 1995 New Zealand New Year's Honours List.

== Legacy ==
=== The Mary Moodie Family Trust ===
After Mary's death, her Sumner properties were sold, and two houses built to operate as care homes by the Mary Moodie Family Trust on a section at 534 Ferry Road, Christchurch. One was known as Mary Moodie House, and the other named Kelly Butler House, each housing six residents, who had been in the care of the Trust and its predecessor organisations as children for many years (39 years in one case). The houses were contracted by the Department of Social Services to provide residential care for people with intellectual disabilities.

=== The Mary Moodie Respite Care Charitable Trust ===
This was a separate trust for respite care of children and young people established on the 14th of August 1995. It later became known as Mary's Respite and is now closed. From August 2017 its work has been undertaken by NZ Care Group.

=== Memorial ===
In 1997, a memorial bench was installed and a tree planted in Mary's name in Barnett Park, Redcliffs, by the Christchurch Family and Foster Care Association Inc., supported by the Hagley-Ferrymead Community Board. It was unveiled on 22 March 1998, on the occasion of National Family and Foster Care Week.

== Royal Commission of Inquiry into Abuse in Care ==
As part of a November 2013 report 'Putting People First', tabled as part of the evidence presented to the Royal Commission of Inquiry into Abuse in Care, the care provided by the Mary Moodie Family Trust was called into question from around 2011 after an anonymous complaint was made to the Needs Assessment Service Co-ordination Association (NASCA).

A 2012 Ministry of Health assessment found that the care standards were falling short, there were ten open police files (such as Fay Gillman's allegations of assault by staff against her daughter Leeanne) and a complaint of a resident being dragged across the floor being investigated by the Health and Disability Commissioner. Relationships between the Trust and residents (and their families) were also breaking down, so temporary managers were put in place. These managers found that residents lived in fear of retribution if they complained. By the end of 2012, the Ministry of Health had terminated its contract with the Trust, and the home had closed, with new places found for all residents. The Mary Moodie Family Trust was removed from the Charities Register in July 2013, and its properties sold in 2015 for NZ$1.2 million. At the behest of families whose relatives had been in the care of the Mary Moodie Family Trust, in 2015 Crown Law investigated whether they should receive part of the proceeds of the sale of the Trusts' properties.

In 2014, the Mary Moodie Family Trust took the Ministry of Health to court, seeking the restoration of its reputation following the termination of the contract.
