= Blue Nun (disambiguation) =

Blue Nun is a brand of wine. The term may also refer to:

- Blue Nun (album), a 1981 album by Carlene Carter
- María de Ágreda, Spanish Franciscan nun
- Sisters of finding Jesus in the Temple, a Catholic religious order popularly known as blue nuns due to the colour of their habit
- Order of the Most Holy Annunciation, a Roman Catholic religious order, also known as Blue Nuns
