= Calvary North Adelaide Hospital =

Hospital in South Australia

Coordinates: 34.9100°S 138.5890°E

- Little Company of Mary Health Care

Geography
- Location: Strangways Terrace, North Adelaide, SA, Australia

Organisation
- Care system: Private
- Type: General
- Affiliated university: None

Services
- Emergency department: No
- Beds: 133

History
- Founded: 1900

Links
- Website: www.calvarycare.org.au/hospitals/calvary-north-adelaide-hospital
- Lists: Hospitals in Australia

Calvary Hospital North Adelaide is a private, not-for-profit Catholic hospital in North Adelaide.

It was previously known as Calvary Hospital Adelaide, originally North Adelaide Hospital, and is one of Adelaide's oldest hospitals, having first been established around 1884, with the Sisters of the Little Company of Mary taking control in 1900.

== History ==
In 1884 Mrs. Isabel Baker and Miss Bessie Baker had been responsible for bringing out a number of sisters of the Dominican Order, who had intended to follow the nursing profession at the deceased Governor Daly's residence on the corner of Ward and Hill Streets in North Adelaide, but owing to unforeseen circumstances, they were not able to do so. The Bakers took over the hospital and Miss Mundy was appointed matron.

In 1900, Mother M. Xavier Lynch of the Nursing Sisters of the Little Company of Mary in Sydney arranged to send five sisters to commence a branch of her order at the hospital, and the Sisters took over the running of the hospital in that year.

Drs Edward Willis Way and James Alexander Greer Hamilton (1854–1925) were the principal surgeons at the North Adelaide Hospital.

== Services ==
Calvary North Adelaide Hospital provides a range of acute and specialist health services, including:

- Medical and surgical services, supported by a perioperative suite with a day of surgery unit, three procedural rooms and seven operating theatres.
- Gastroenterology services, including diagnostic and interventional endoscopy procedures.
- Cancer services, including medical oncology and chemotherapy treatment services.
- Maternity and women’s health services, including birthing and postnatal care.
- Palliative and end-of-life care through the Mary Potter Hospice, a 15-bed inpatient hospice unit.
- Diagnostic and support services including radiology, pathology, physiotherapy, occupational therapy and pharmacy services.

== Description ==
Calvary North Adelaide Hospital is a fully operational hospital which, according to Calvary Health Care’s 2019–20 Annual Review, has 133 beds.

Much of the hospital is heritage listed, maintaining its turn of the century exterior and interior.

It features a large maternity wing, 8 operating theatres, day surgery suite, 1 medical ward including a day infusion centre, two surgical wards all supported by a Level II Intensive Care Unit.

The hospital also houses the extensive Mary Potter Hospice, a 15-bed hospice caring for palliative care patients, and a comprehensive Oncology Centre, a radiology department, and also multiple specialist suites within or adjacent to the hospital.

The grounds at the rear of the hospital also contains a turn of the century chapel.

It is located on Strangways Terrace in North Adelaide, only two kilometres from the Adelaide city centre.

It is owned by parent corporation Little Company of Mary Health Care (or "Calvary Health Care") which, in 2006, acquired Calvary Wakefield Hospital, Calvary Central Districts Hospital and Calvary Rehabilitation Hospital. Due to these acquisitions, the original hospital is now known as Calvary North Adelaide instead of Calvary Hospital Adelaide.

== Facilities ==
Facilities at Calvary North Adelaide Hospital include patient rooms, visitor lounges and landscaped grounds. The campus also contains a heritage-listed chapel and dedicated support service areas.
