= 1969 Birthday Honours (New Zealand) =

Awards list for New Zealand

The 1969 Queen's Birthday Honours in New Zealand, celebrating the official birthday of Elizabeth II, were appointments made by the Queen on the advice of the New Zealand government to various orders and honours to reward and highlight good works by New Zealanders. They were announced on 14 June 1969.

The recipients of honours are displayed here as they were styled before their new honour.

== Order of the Bath ==
=== Companion (CB) ===
Military division

- Major General Robert Boyd Dawson CBE DSO – Generals' List (Regular Force).
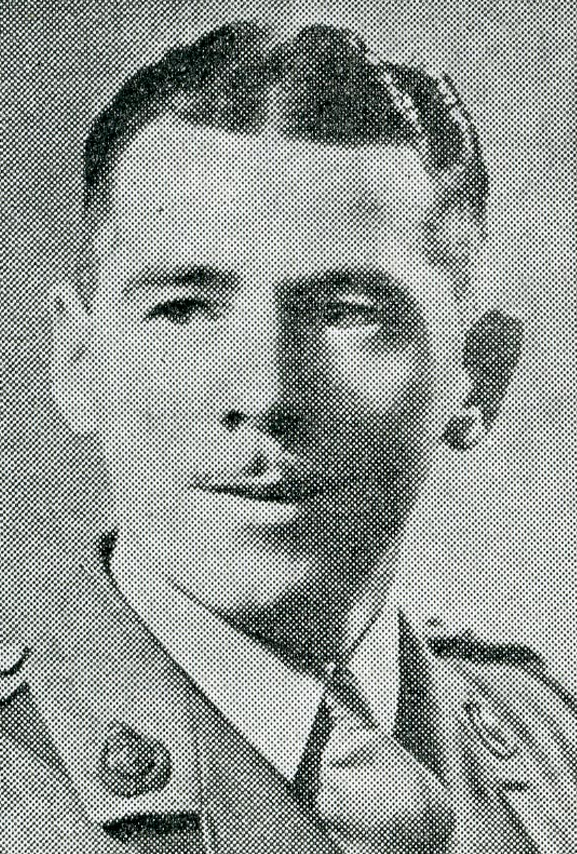
Robert Dawson

== Order of Saint Michael and Saint George ==
=== Companion (CMG) ===
- Alfred Onslow Glasse OBE MC JP. For services to the community and particularly to local government in Auckland.
- Adrian George Rodda – chairman, State Services Commission.
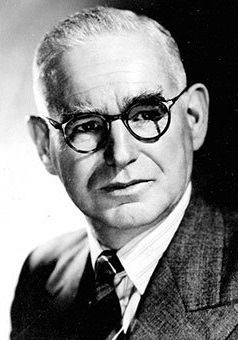
Fred Glasse

== Order of the British Empire ==
=== Knight Commander (KBE) ===
Civil division

- Hamilton Mitchell – of Wellington; president of the New Zealand Returned Services Association.
- Henry Ernest Blyde CBE JP – of New Plymouth. For services to local government.

=== Commander (CBE) ===
Civil division

- Eardley Lorimer Button OBE ED FRCS FRACS – of Wellington. For services to the medical profession.
- Ronald Alan Candy OBE – of Waitoa. For services to the dairy industry.
- Leonard Thomas Daniell DCM – of Masterton. For services to farming.
- Henry Rodolph Wigley OBE – of Timaru. For services to the tourist industry.

Military division

- Commodore Leonard Stanley Stanners OBE – General List (Supply and Secretariat Specialization), Royal New Zealand Navy.
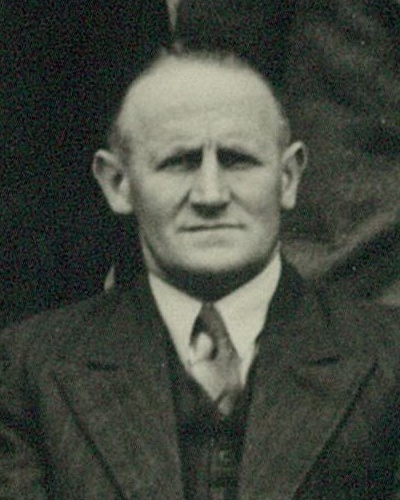
Alan Candy

=== Officer (OBE) ===
Civil division

- Harold Philip Fowler – of Invercargill. For services to education.
- Wallace Galloway JP – of Dannevirke. For services to the community.
- Henry Lewis Gibson – of Dunedin. For services to the community.
- Harold Cecil Holland – of Auckland. For services to industry and education.
- Norah Martin (Mother Mary Bernard) – provincial superior for New Zealand of the Little Company of Mary. For services to the nursing profession.
- John O'Halloran JP – of Te Kūiti. For services to the community.
- John Joseph Parsons – of Pātea. For services to agriculture.
- Selwyn Isaac Vercoe JP – of Blenheim. For services to journalism and to the community.
- Alfred Walmsley – of Invercargill. For services to commerce and the community.
- Robert Fleming Wardlaw JP – of Waimana. For services to the community.

Military division

- Surgeon Commander James Smith Watt Frew – Royal New Zealand Navy.
- Lieutenant Colonel John Harold Gray – Royal New Zealand Infantry Regiment (Territorial Force).
- Wing Commander David Manson Crooks – Royal New Zealand Air Force.

=== Member (MBE) ===
Civil division

- Ernest Edwin Beale JP – of Woodville. For services to the community.
- David Joseph Berry – of Raetihi. For services in local government and to farming, especially as a sheep breeder.
- Charles Oliver Coad – chairman, Wellington advisory committee, New Zealand Foundation for the Blind.
- Clare Esther Mary Crawford – of Christchurch. For services to the community.
- Michael Francis Foley – of Stratford. For services to the acclimatisation movement.
- Sidney James Guppy JP – of Nelson. For services to sport.
- Laura Mary Harry. For services to the community of Buller particularly in hospital and nursing fields.
- René Mary MacLennan – lately matron, Rawene Hospital, Hokianga.
- Laurence Carrington Mail MB ChB – of Geraldine. For services to the community, particularly in the medical field.
- Robert Steele Martin JP – county engineer, Rotorua.
- Arthur William Miller – of Taradale. For services to the community.
- Francis William Laidlaw Milne – of Auckland. For services to the community.
- Arthur Mervyn Nicholson JP – of Auckland. For services to education.
- Te Arahori Potaka – of Wanganui. For services to the Māori people.
- Donald Stewart Reid JP – resident commissioner and stipendiary magistrate, Chatham Islands.
- Vivian George Herbert Rickard JP – of Rangitukia. For services to local government and community affairs.
- Russell Robertson – of Oamaru. For services to sport.
- Dora Frances Steptoe – vice-president, Women's Borstal Association.

Military division

- Lieutenant (Temporary Lieutenant Commander) David John Collins – Royal New Zealand Navy.
- Warrant Officer First Class Graham Robertson Young – Royal Regiment of New Zealand Artillery (Regular Force).
- Warrant Officer First Class Stanley Desmond Michael Benedict Wright – Royal Regiment of New Zealand Artillery (Regular Force).
- Warrant Officer First Class Clifford Melrose Kennedy BEM – Royal New Zealand Infantry Regiment (Regular Force).
- Major Anthony Thomas Mortiboy ED – Royal New Zealand Corps of Signals (Territorial Force).
- Squadron Leader (now Wing Commander) Leonard James Thompson – Royal New Zealand Air Force.

== Companion of the Imperial Service Order (ISO) ==
- William Hay – lately managing director, State Advances Corporation.

== British Empire Medal (BEM) ==
Civil division

- Douglas William Arter. For services to soldiers overseas.
- Myrtle Ann Mary Bell. For services to the community, particularly youth projects, in Reefton.
- Estelle Colleen Brunker. For services to sport in Whangārei and Northland.
- Aileen Charlotte Clements. For services to the community in Nelson.
- Walter Francis Collins – welding overseer, New Zealand Electricity Department.
- Alice Mary Dent. For services to the community in Taupō.
- Christina Harley. For services to the community in Broad Bay.
- Daniel Robert Hyde. For services to youth in Auckland.
- John Wates Luskie – senior engineer's assistant (mechanical), New Zealand Electricity Department.
- Louise Miles - For services to handicapped children in Christchurch.
- John Russell – detective sergeant, New Zealand Police Force, Kaikohe.
- Laura Joan Swan. For services to the community particularly as an entertainer in Auckland.
- Frank Thomson – detective, New Zealand Police Force, Wanganui.

Military division

- Chief Mechanician William Anthony Barry – Royal New Zealand Navy.
- Chief Radioman John Nicholas Hewson – Royal New Zealand Navy.
- Staff Sergeant Edward Peter Agnew – Royal New Zealand Engineers (Territorial Force).
- Staff Sergeant Russell John Meek – Royal New Zealand Armoured Corps (Territorial Force).
- Staff Sergeant Peter Quinn – Royal New Zealand Army Medical Corps (Regular Force).
- Staff Sergeant Edward George Willbond – Royal Regiment of New Zealand Artillery (Regular Force).
- Sergeant Peter Alexander Shilton – Royal New Zealand Air Force.
- Flight Sergeant Eric David Waghorn – Royal New Zealand Air Force.

== Air Force Cross (AFC) ==
- Wing Commander Frederick Martin Kinvig – Royal New Zealand Air Force.

== Queen's Police Medal (QPM) ==
- William Harold Angus Sharp – Assistant Commissioner, New Zealand Police.
- Archibald Conrad Blackwell Wade – chief superintendent, New Zealand Police.

== Queen's Commendation for Valuable Service in the Air ==
- Flight Lieutenant Graham Neville Lucas – Royal New Zealand Air Force.
