= Bessie Anstice Baker =

Australian writer

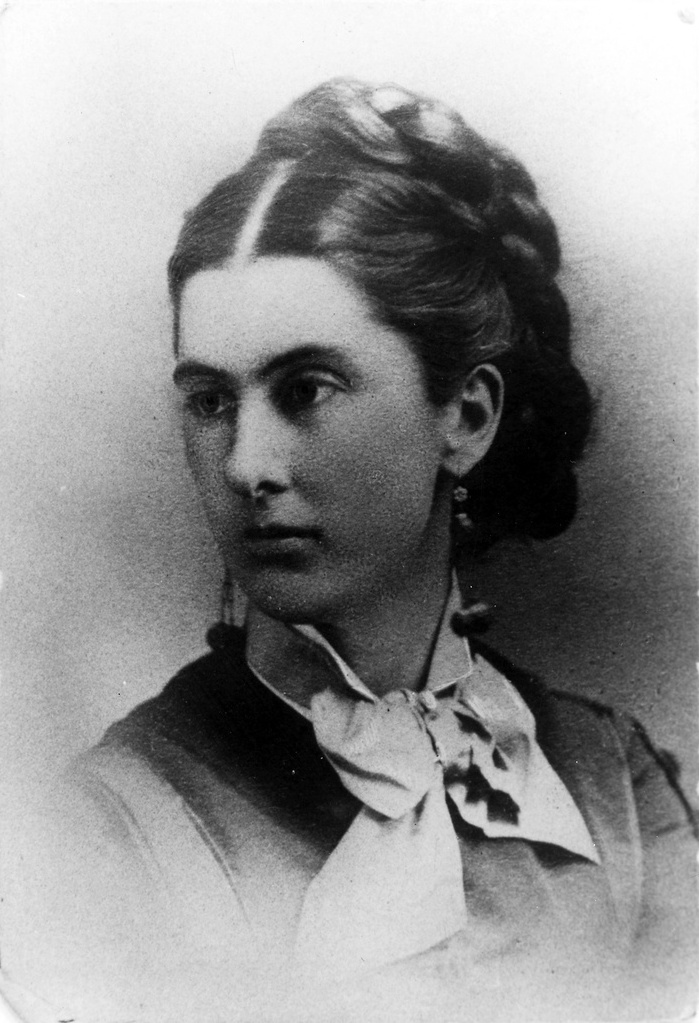
- Portrait of Bessie Anstice Baker from the Library of South Australia
- Born: 24 September 1849; Magill, South Australia, Australia
- Died: 16 October 1914 (aged 65); London, England
- Occupations: writer, lay Catholic leader
- Notable work: A Modern Pilgrim's Progress

Elizabeth Anstice Baker (24 September 1849 – 16 October 1914) was an Australian writer, philanthropist, and social reformer. Born into an Anglican family, she converted to Roman Catholicism and wrote a book about her religious journey, entitled A Modern Pilgrim's Progress. The book was widely read in Catholic circles and was translated into French. She received the Pro Ecclesia et Pontifice medal from Pope Pius X in 1902, becoming the first Australian woman to be honored with this medal.

Baker was active in supporting charitable causes, both in Australia and in England. With her mother, Isabelle Baker, she established the first Catholic hospital in Adelaide, South Australia, Australia. A women's rights activist, she participated in the suffrage movement in Australia and England, and was a member of the Catholic Women's League. She also organized a mobile church ministry in England and Wales, known as a motor church, to serve the needs of both Catholics and non-Catholics in rural areas.

== Early life and family ==
Elizabeth Anstice Baker, known as "Bessie", was born on 24 September 1849. According to newspaper articles at the time of her death, she was born in England; she later emigrated to Australia with her family at the age of 15. However, the Australian Dictionary of Biography lists her birthplace as Magill, a suburb of Adelaide, in South Australia.

Her parents were John Baker and Isabella Morrison Baker (née Allan), wealthy landowners. John Baker was born in England, and emigrated at age 25 to the British colony of Van Diemen's Land, now known as Tasmania. Isabella Baker was born in Scotland; her father George Allen was a wealthy landowner in Van Dieman's land. The couple had twelve children; Elizabeth was the sixth child. Her sister Mary Ross died at age 20, shortly after giving birth, and her younger brother, Augustus, died in 1868 of diphtheria.

Baker's father was a successful pastoralist who became quite wealthy through his business dealings. After spending years in Van Diemen's Land, he moved to South Australia where he was a leading figure in society. Among other business and civil endeavors, he helped to establish the South Australia Chamber of Commerce, and served as its first chair. He entered politics in the 1850s, serving on the South Australia Legislative Council and briefly serving as the South Australian premier. He died in 1872, and was given a state funeral. One of his sons, Richard Chaffey Baker, also became a noted Australian politician.

Elizabeth's childhood was shaped by being raised in an affluent and socially active family. She had private schooling at home, and was tutored by Anglican clergyman, as was typical of well-to-do families at that time. Elizabeth was highly intelligent and an avid reader. She also studied in England, and in Paris from 1860 to 1862, before returning to Adelaide to live again with her family.

== Conversion to Catholicism ==
Baker was raised in the Anglican Church of Australia. She recalls in her book A Modern Pilgrim's Progress that her family said daily prayers at home, presumably from the Anglican prayer book, and attended church every Sunday. The family observed a strict sabbath, not allowing children to play or read novels, but encouraging them to read religious material only. Despite finding Sunday services "dull", Baker continued to be regular in church attendance. As a young woman and adult, she was an active church member. When she was grown, she played organ at services at the Anglican church in Adelaide, and taught Sunday School classes.

However, she wrestled internally with questions about her faith. She found it troubling that there were divergent views within Anglicanism; in Australia, these differences were highlighted by internal disputes in the Anglican Church in Australia between those favoring a "high church" tradition, adopting a formal liturgy, and those with a more evangelical approach to the faith, with an emphasis on personal conversion. Baker read widely in theology and philosophy, seeking to find a firm foundation that she could rely on. She was particularly concerned with reconciling a modern view of science with religious belief.

In 1876, Baker traveled to Europe with her sisters and their mother, Isabelle. While residing in France, she was influenced by Etienne Le Vigoureux, a French Dominican priest who served as a teacher and mentor. He was particularly helpful in addressing her questions about science and religion.

After years of spiritual struggle, she decided to convert from Anglicanism to Catholicism while in France. As is typical of converts to the Catholic Church, she went through a period of study and preparation for her conversion. She was then accepted into full communion in the Catholic Church in December 1877. Her mother, Isabelle, later converted to Catholicism as well, in 1881.

== Social reform and philanthropy ==
After three years of living in Europe, Baker returned to Australia in 1879. Independently wealthy, she devoted her time, energy and funds to social causes. She served for two years on South Australia's State Children's Council, from 1888 to 1889. Among others, Baker served on the council alongside woman's rights activist Catherine Helen Spence. Like Spence, Baker believed that women should have the right to vote, and was an active supporter of the women's suffrage movement.

She was also active in supporting the Catholic community in Adelaide. She became a benefactor to Mary Rose Columba Adams, an English Benedictine sister, and helped fund the establishment of a congregation of Benedictine sisters in Adelaide. Baker and her mother, Isabelle, led a campaign to establish a Catholic hospital in Adelaide, called The Calvary Hospital; the Bakers recruited nurses from among the sisters of the Dominican order and the Little Company of Mary. Bessie Baker managed the hospital, and oversaw the development of a nursing school.

In 1901, Baker moved to London, England. She continued to participate in social reform movements, and joined the fight for women's suffrage in England. She was also active in the Catholic Missionary Society and the Catholic Women's League.

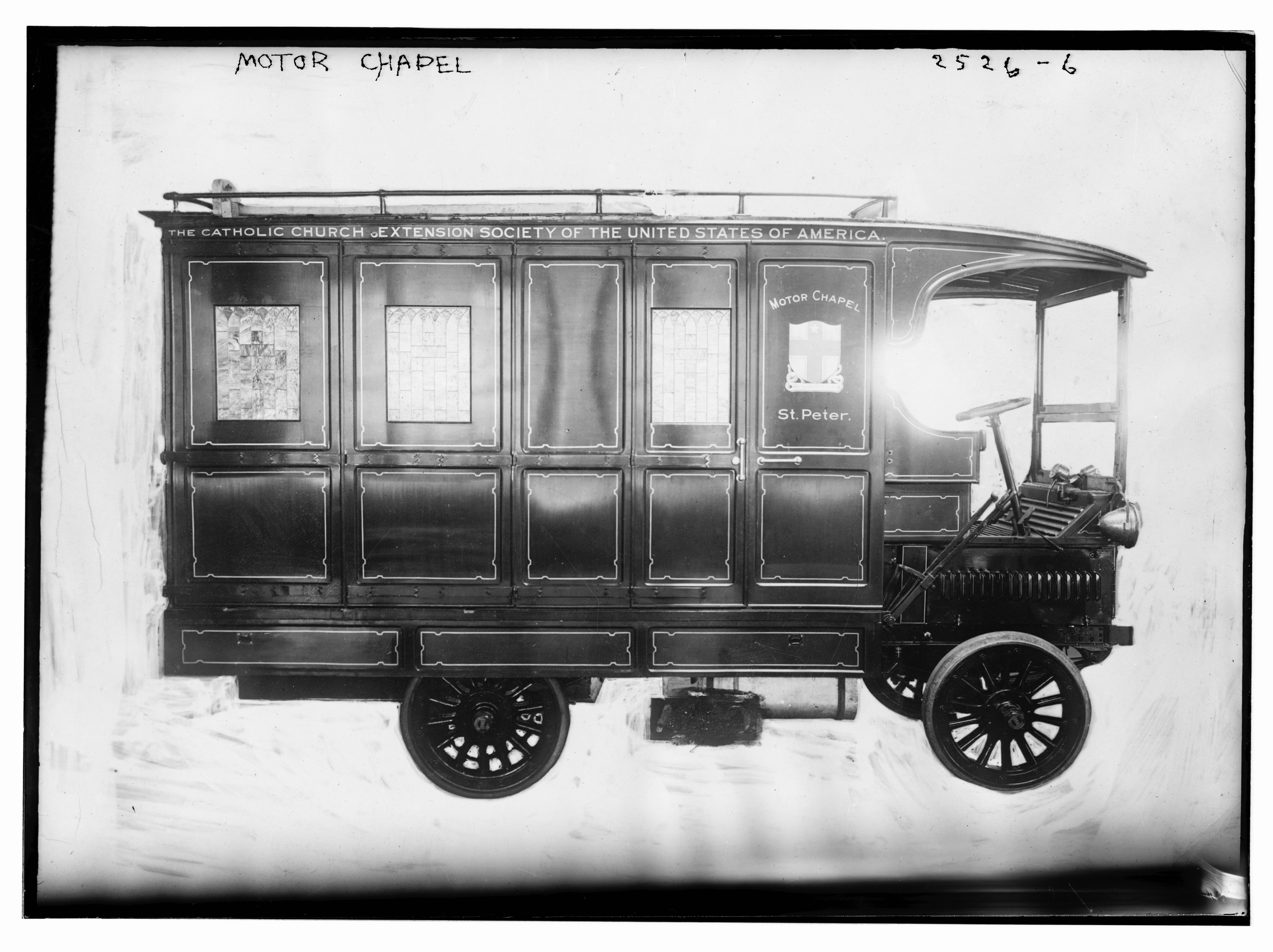
A Catholic Motor Chapel in 1910

As part of her charitable outreach, Baker started a "motor church" in England and Wales, providing funding and organizational support. Motor churches or chapels were vehicles that could be used as small chapels for holding services; they were driven to remote areas, where full-time clergy were not available, to provide religious and charitable support to communities.

== A Modern Pilgrim's Progress ==
While living in England, Baker penned a memoir about her conversion to Catholicism, entitled A Modern Pilgrim's Progress. The title is an homage to a classic Christian text by the English Puritan John Bunyan. In her book, Baker shared her own intellectual wrestling with matters of faith, including how scientific knowledge, such as the theory of evolution, could be reconciled with religious belief. Revealing the breadth and depth of her self-directed study in these matters, she discussed the writings of well-known philosophers and scientists, including Immanuel Kant, Charles Darwin, and Herbert Spencer. Her clear writing and a well-reasoned and logical engagement with these weighty questions contributed to the book's popularity.

According to the introduction, Baker first wrote the book at the request of a personal friend, as a personal reflection, but later was encouraged to publish it. The first edition was published in 1906. It had several printings and was translated into French. It was very well received in Catholic circles.

== Honours ==
In 1902, in a ceremony led by Cardinal Moran in Rome, Baker received the Pro Ecclesia et Pontifice medal from Pope Pius X. The medal was awarded to her for her "devotion and fidelity" to the Catholic Church and the Pope. She was the first Australian woman to receive this medal.

== Death ==
After having contracted influenza, Baker died on 16 October 1914 in London, England. She is buried in Fulham, England, in the church graveyard of St. Thomas' Church.

== See also ==
- Catholic Church in Australia
- List of converts to Catholicism
