= Hobart Private Hospital =

Hospital in Tasmania, Australia

- Healthscope
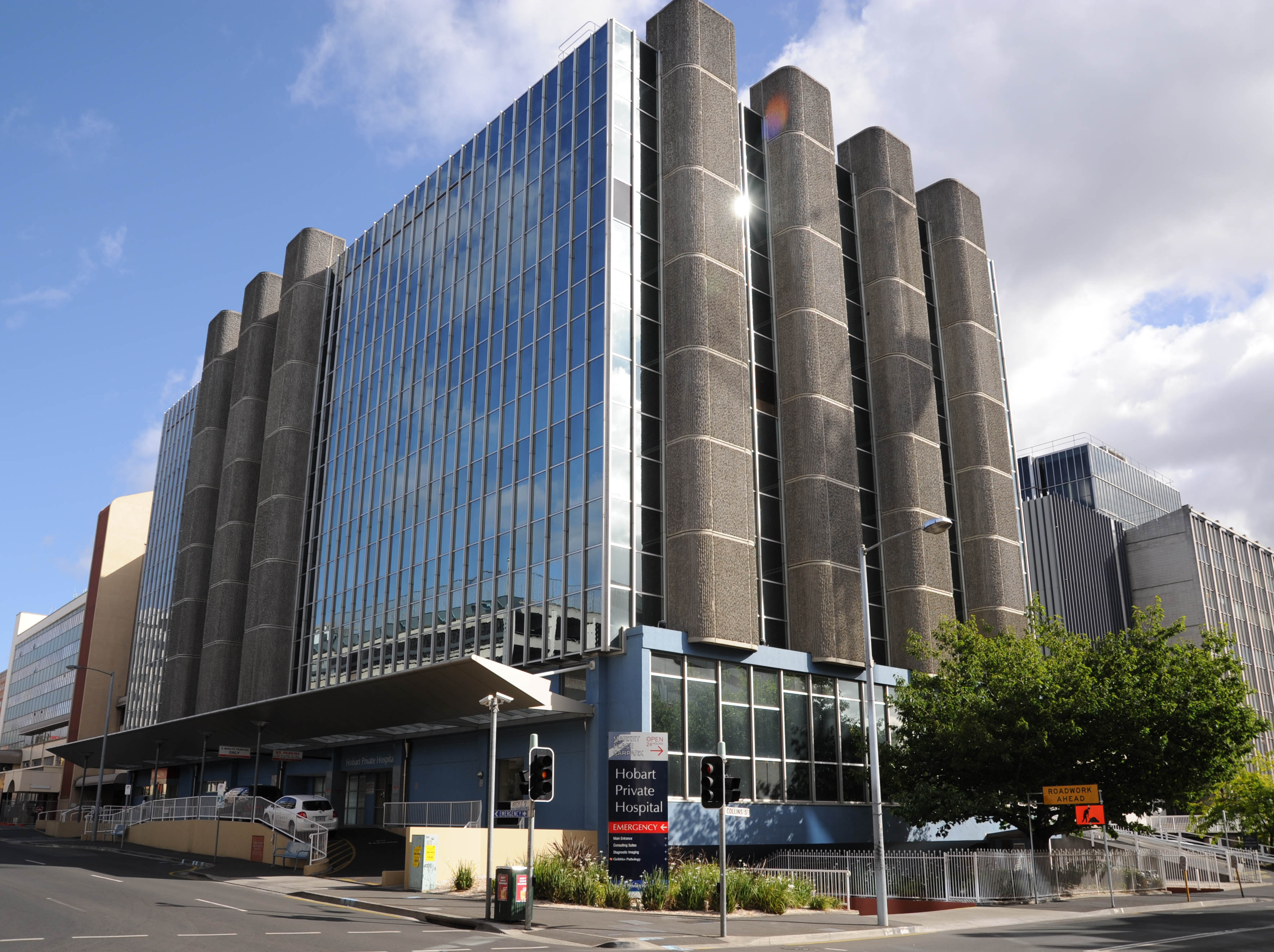

Geography
- Location: Hobart, Tasmania, Australia, Australia
- Coordinates: 42.880777°S 147.329928°E

Organisation
- Type: Private hospital

Services
- Emergency department: Yes

History
- Founded: 1999

Links
- Website: Official Website
- Lists: Hospitals in Australia

The Hobart Private Hospital is a 146-bed private hospital located in the central business district of Hobart adjacent to the Royal Hobart Hospital. It is owned by Healthscope, one of Australia's leading providers of hospitals, medical and pathology centres.

The Hobart Private Hospital provides private health care specialising in the areas of emergency, cardiac, maternity, orthopaedics, gastroenterology, urology, plastic and reconstructive surgery, respiratory medicine, rehab and general surgery.

In December 2019, after previous discussions ended in a stalemate, it was announced that the lease to Healthscope would be renewed for another 20 years.

In 2026, following the collapse of Healthscope, the hospital plans to be offloaded to buyer Calvary Health. The sale has sparked fears that Calvary will no longer honour gender-affirming care, abortion, IVF or contraception at the hospital. Tasmanian health minister Bridget Archer says she will make sure that Tasmania will not lose access to such services, whether it will be negotiations with Calvary or a private health system in the public health system.
