= Calvary Mater Newcastle =

- Calvary Health Care
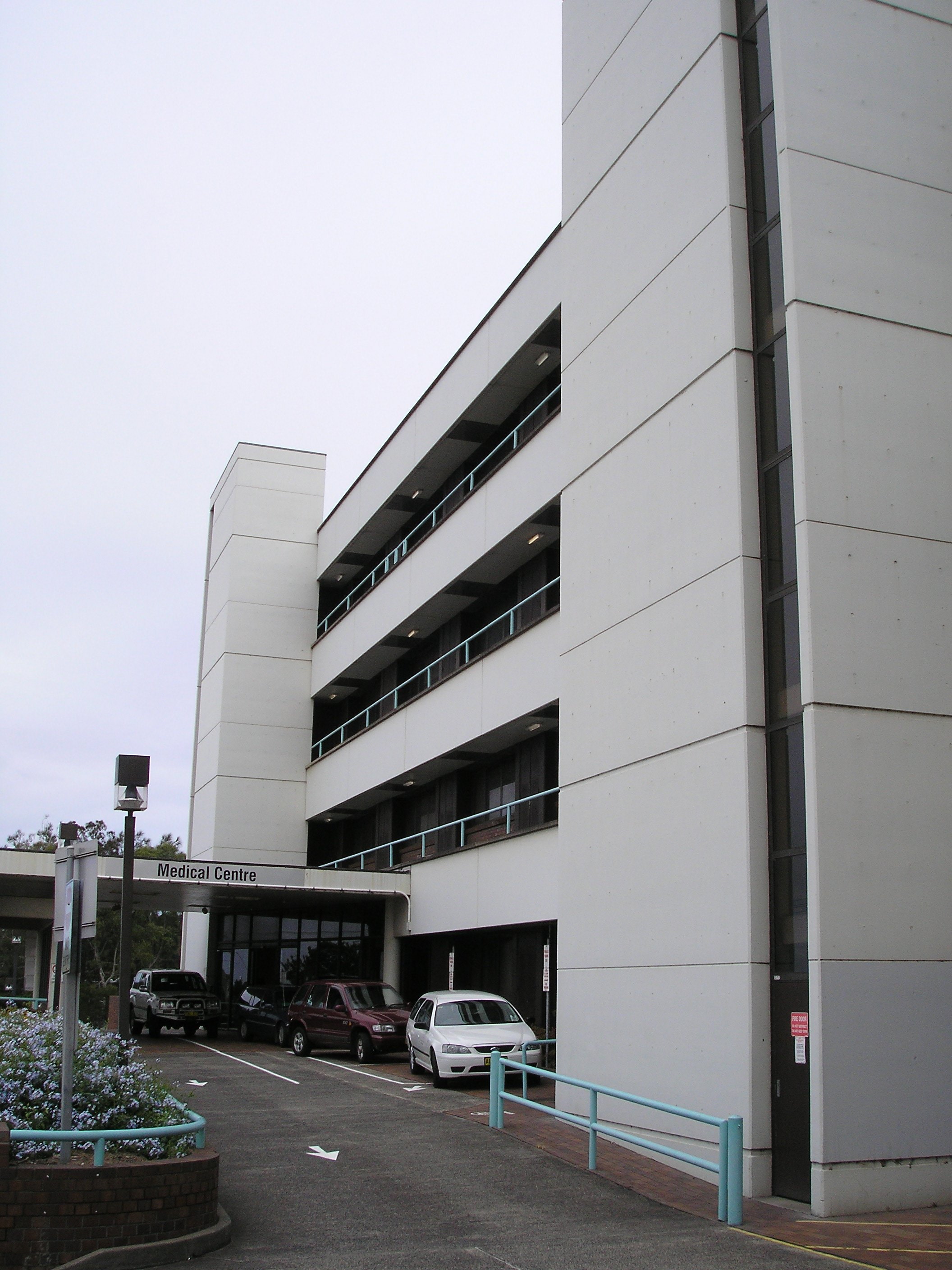
- Calvary Mater Newcastle pre-redevelopment in 2007

Geography
- Location: Cnr Edith Street & Platt Street, Waratah, New South Wales, Australia
- Coordinates: 32.8986°S 151.7208°E

Organisation
- Care system: Public Medicare (AU)
- Type: Public–private partnership
- Affiliated university: University of Newcastle
- Network: Hunter New England Local Health District

Services
- Emergency department: Yes
- Beds: 215

History
- Founded: 8 December 1921 by Sisters of Mercy as the Newcastle Mater Misericordiae Hospital

Links
- Website: www.calvarycare.org.au/hospitals/calvary-mater-newcastle
- Lists: Hospitals in Australia
- Other links: www.nsw.gov.au/departments-and-agencies/hnelhd

The Calvary Mater Newcastle (commonly known as The Mater, Waratah) is a teaching, psychiatric and cancer hospital in Newcastle within the Hunter region of New South Wales, Australia. Prior to 2007, the hospital was known as the Newcastle Mater Misericordiae Hospital which was originally operated by the Catholic Sisters of Mercy.

The 215 bed hospital is a major teaching hospital of the University of Newcastle, alongside the nearby John Hunter Hospital. The hospital contains an emergency department with trauma mostly being diverted to John Hunter.

== Overview ==
The hospital was opened on 21 December 1921 as a then-34 bed facility operated by the Singleton Convent of the Catholic Sisters of Mercy. The hospitals original building, a grand mansion known as Enmore Hall, was a converted private residence of the late Colonel Charles Frederick Stokes, purchased by the Sisters of Mercy from his widow, Ada Gertrude Stokes. This building has been demolished.

The hospital was officially opened and dedicated by the Archbishop of Sydney, Michael Kelly, on 25 March 1922 with Mother Mary Magdalen its first Directress.

Following the 1989 Newcastle earthquake and the construction and establishment of the John Hunter Hospital at nearby New Lambton Heights, many specialties were relocated to the new hospital. In 1991, the maternity ward was closed and all future birthing was relocated to the John Hunter and later Newcastle Private Hospital, ending the decades-old motto of "Born Smarter at the Mater".

The hospital underwent a three and a half year $161M redevelopment led by construction company Abigroup which was completed in 2009.

In 2025, it was revealed that the hospital has a major mould infestation due to defective external cladding as well as critical pest and maintenance failures. In 2026, Liberal National Coalition Shadow Minister for Health, Sarah Mitchell, moved a motion to establish a parliamentary enquiry into the 'Management, maintenance and operational issues at Calvary Mater Hospital, Newcastle' which was established on 4 February 2026. The state Labor government voted against the enquiry.

=== Ownership ===
The hospital is not owned or affiliated with Mater Group; it was transferred from the Sisters of Mercy to NSW Health which the state Labor government led by Morris Iemma thereafter converted into a public–private partnership in 2006. The partnership operates between the public NSW Health and the private and non-for-profit Little Company of Mary Health Care, trading as Calvary Health Care with the facilities management being overseen by Honeywell.

== Specialty services provided ==
The Newcastle Calvary Mater provides the following services and clinics:

- Anaesthesia
- BreastScreen NSW
- Cardiology
- Coronary care
- Emergency medicine
- General medicine
- Hemodynamics
- Intensive care
- Oncology
- Palliative care
- Pathology
- Psychiatry
- Radiology
- Respiratory medicine
- Speech pathology
- Toxicology and Pharmacology

== Gallery ==
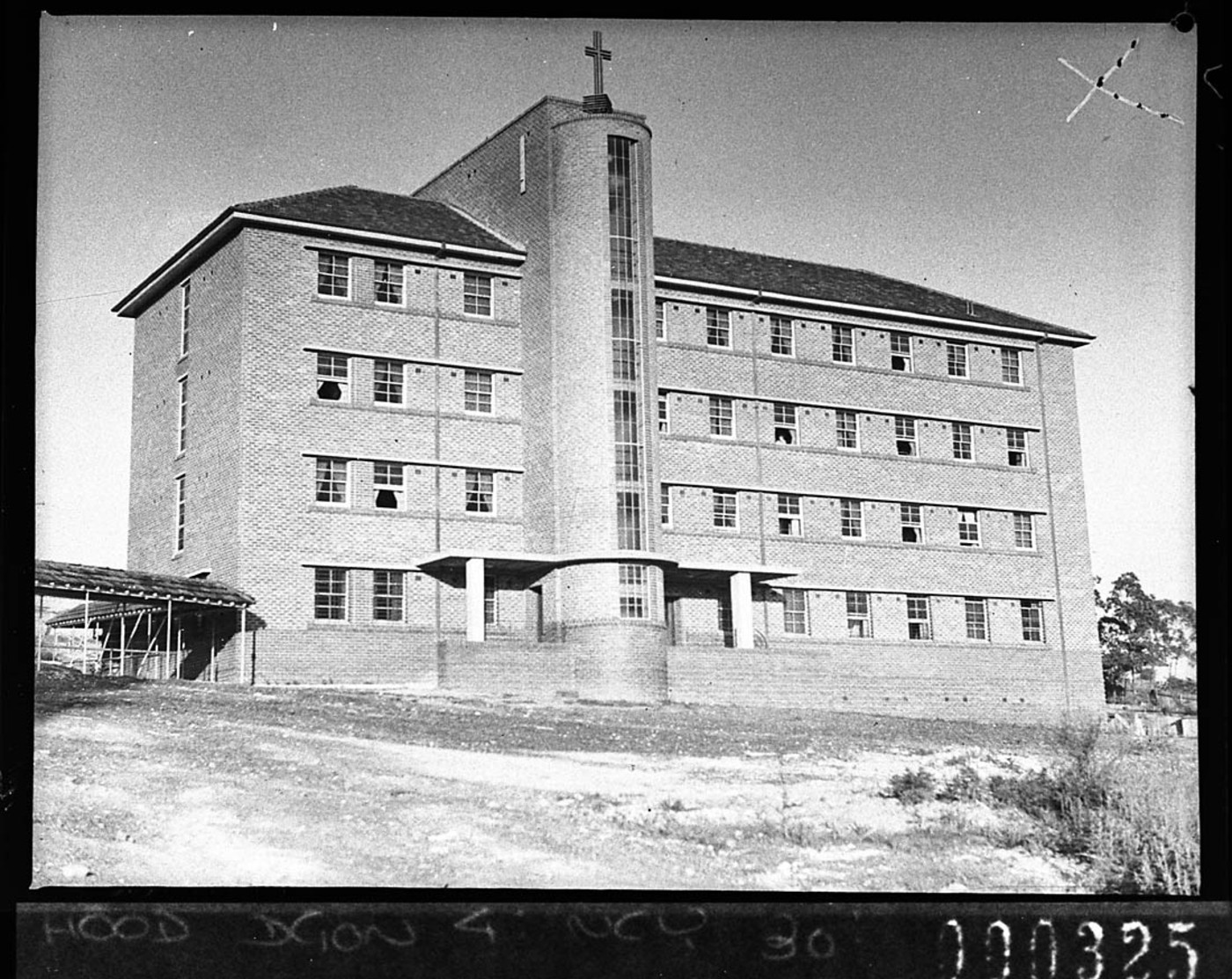
Newcastle Mater Misericordiae Hospital, 1939

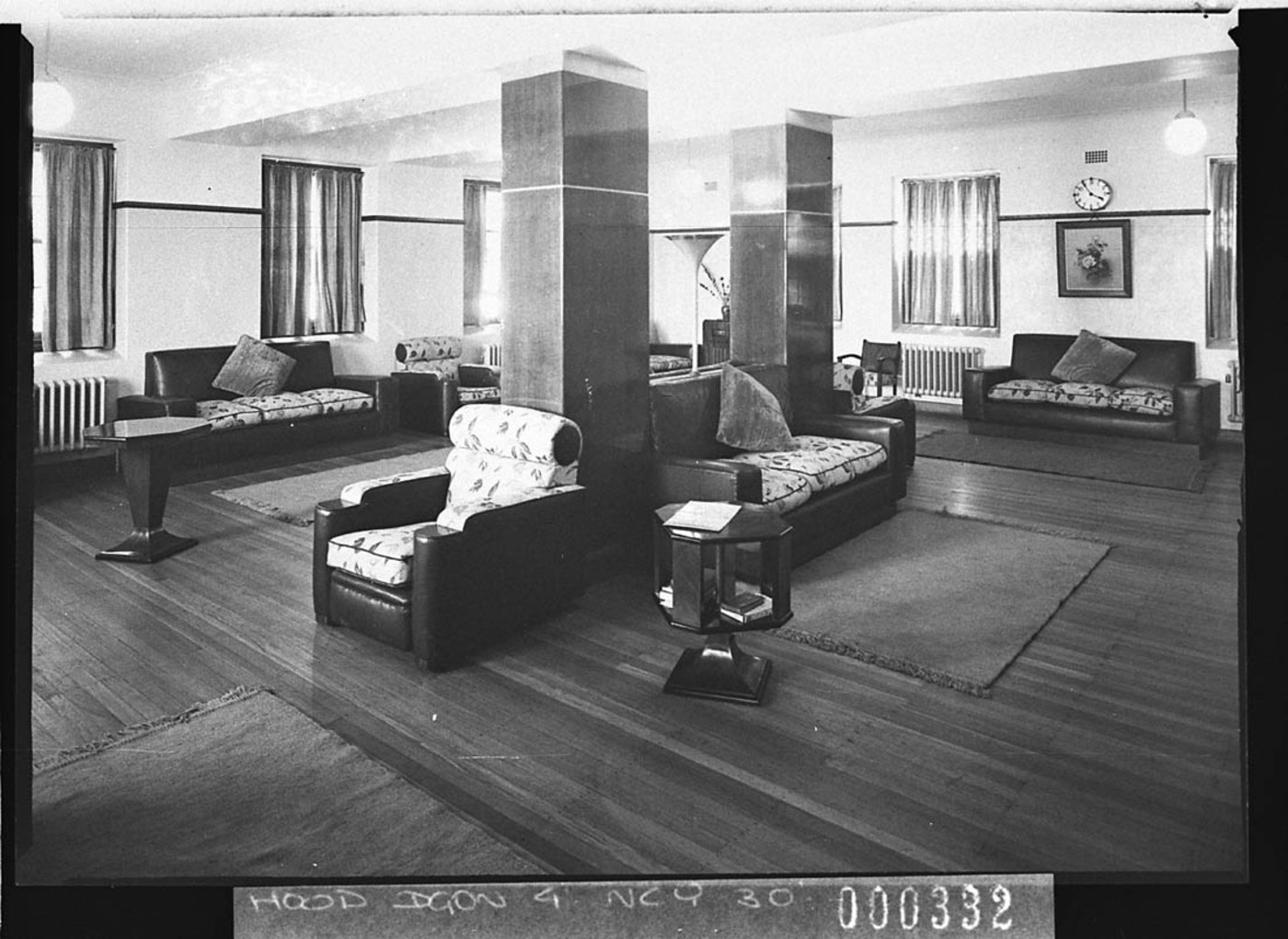
Newcastle Mater Misericordiae Hospital waiting room, 1939

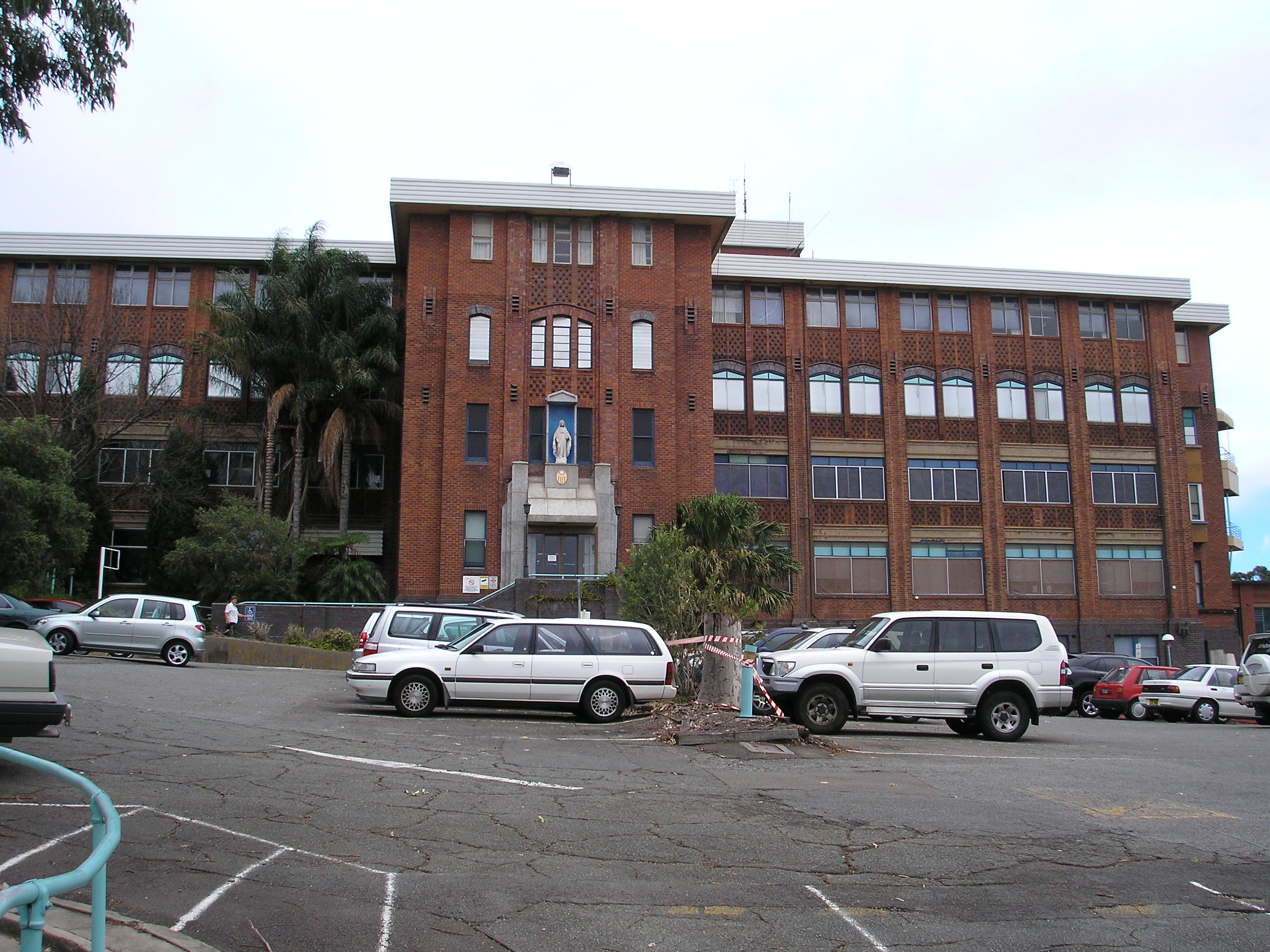
Calvary Mater building (demolished as part of redevelopment), 2007

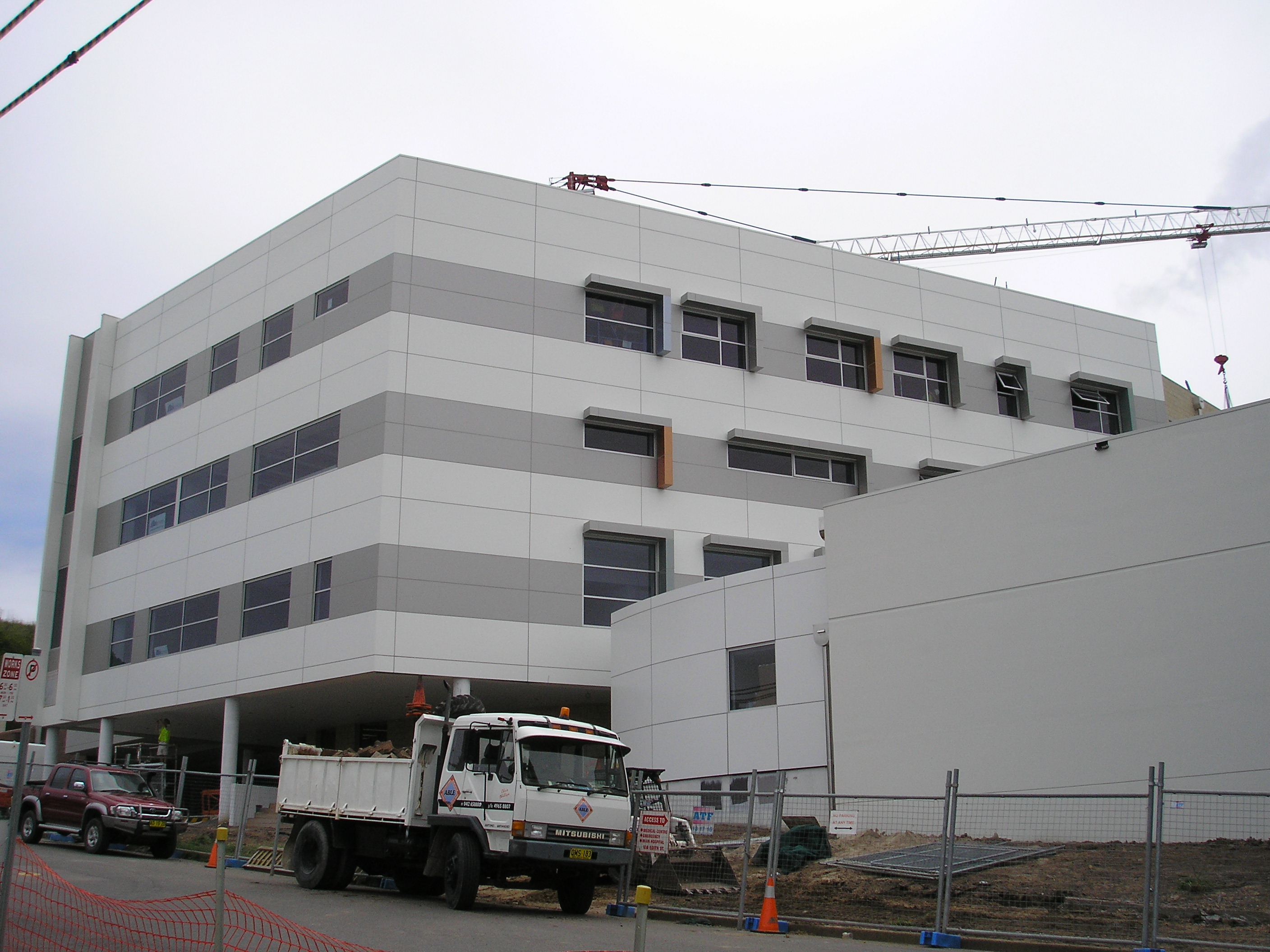
Calvary Mater under redevelopment, 2007

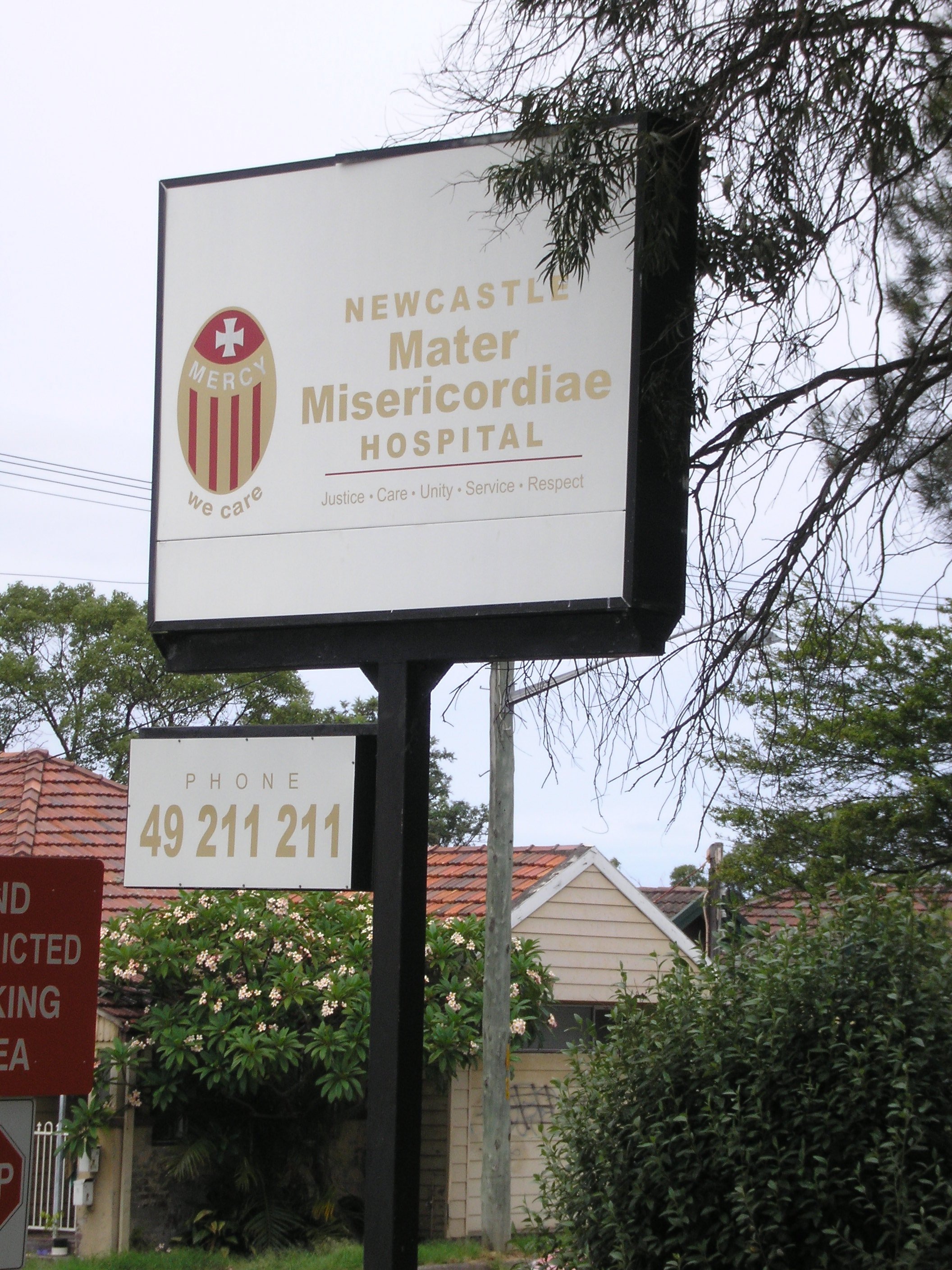
Original entry sign, pre-2007
