= René Shadbolt =

New Zealand military nurse, and hospital matron

René Mary Shadbolt MBE (26 April 1903–16 August 1977) was a notable New Zealand civilian and military nurse, and hospital matron. She was born in Duvauchelle, Banks Peninsula, New Zealand in 1903, and died in Henderson in 1977.

She was one of three nurses from New Zealand in the Spanish Civil War, and married Willi Remmel a German anti-fascist volunteer in Spain in 1938.

She was a nurse at a military convalescent hospital in World War II, and then from 1949 to 1967 was matron of the Hokianga Hospital in Rawene, Northland. In the 1969 Queen's Birthday Honours, she was appointed a Member of the Order of the British Empire, in recognition of her services.

She remarried (briefly) to George MacLennan in 1944. A nursing scholarship for trainee nurses from the Hokianga area, the Rene Mary MacLennan Scholarship, was established in her memory.

In the suburb of Blockhouse Bay, Auckland, there is a park called Sister Rene Shadbolt Park, named in her honour.
