= Alan Candy =

New Zealand dairy industry leader (1903–1974)

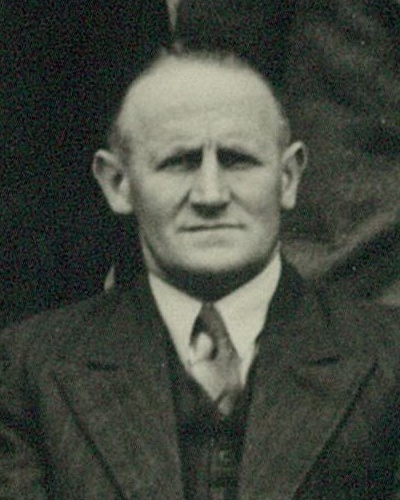
Candy in 1948

Ronald Alan Candy CBE (25 August 1903 – 27 October 1974) was a New Zealand farmer and dairy industry leader. He was born in Wanganui, New Zealand, on 25 August 1903. He was chairman of Massey Agricultural College from 1944 to 1946.

In the 1946 New Year Honours, Candy was appointed an Officer of the Order of the British Empire, in recognition of his services as a member of the National Council of Primary Production. In 1953, he was awarded the Queen Elizabeth II Coronation Medal, and in the 1969 Queen's Birthday Honours he was promoted to Commander of the Order of the British Empire, for services to the dairy industry.
