= St Lukes Private Hospital =

Hospital in Tasmania, Australia

Calvary St Luke's Hospital
- Little Company of Mary Health Care

Geography
- Location: Launceston, Northern Tasmania, Tasmania, Australia, Australia
- Coordinates: 41.4339°S 147.1494°E

Organisation
- Care system: Private health insurance
- Type: Private hospital
- Affiliated university: Catholic Church, Little Company of Mary Health Care

Services
- Emergency department: No
- Beds: 120

History
- Opened: 1900

Links
- Website: www.calvarycare.org.au/hospitals/calvary-st-lukes-hospital-launceston
- Lists: Hospitals in Australia

Calvary St Luke’s Hospital is a private hospital located in Launceston, Tasmania, Australia. Formerly known as St Luke’s Private Hospital, it forms part of the health services available in northern Tasmania and is operated by Little Company of Mary Health Care, trading nationally as Calvary Health Care Australia.

== History ==
St Luke’s Private Hospital was founded in 1900 by the St Luke’s Anglican Association, a charitable organisation established to provide care for the aged, disabled and terminally ill.

The hospital was sold in 1986 and again in 2004, when it became part of Little Company of Mary Health Care, a Catholic not-for-profit health care organisation operating nationally as Calvary Health Care Australia.

== Facilities ==
Calvary St Luke’s Hospital includes general medical wards, inpatient mental health facilities, palliative care units, and associated patient services. The hospital campus also includes a chapel and on-site parking facilities.

The hospital provides services to both private patients and the public health system. Media reporting has noted the hospital’s role within the broader Launceston health network, including the impact of infrastructure issues on service delivery.

== Services ==
Calvary St Luke’s Hospital provides a range of medical, palliative and mental health services to the Launceston region and surrounding areas.

The hospital operates The Calvary Clinic, a private inpatient mental health unit located on the hospital campus. The Calvary Clinic provides inpatient and day therapy programs for adults experiencing conditions such as anxiety disorders, depression, bipolar disorder and post-traumatic stress disorder (PTSD).

According to Healthdirect Australia, The Calvary Clinic is the only private inpatient mental health facility in northern Tasmania.

The hospital has also been referenced in ABC News reporting in relation to temporary service disruptions and the transfer of some surgical services, reflecting its interaction with the broader Tasmanian health system.
