= Annie Lynch =

Religious and hospital administrator (1870 – 1938)

Personal life
- Born: 4 December 1864 Ranahinch, County Westmeath, Ireland
- Died: 7 June 1938 (aged 73) Wollongong, New South Wales, Australia
- Known for: Hospital administration

Religious life
- Religion: Christianity (Catholic)
- Order: The Little Company of Mary
- Monastic name: Mother Mary Xavier

Annie Lynch (1864 – 1938), known by her religious name as Mother Mary Xavier, was an Irish-born Australian religious sister and nurse. She was a member of the Little Company of Mary, and served as the congregation's first provincial for the region of Australasia. She oversaw the growth of the Lewisham Hospital as superior of the Lewisham convent. As provincial, she established several more hospitals in Australia and New Zealand.

== Early years ==
Annie Lynch was born on 4 December 1864 in the town of Ranahinch, in County Westmeath, Ireland. She was named after her mother, Annie Lynch, née O'Reilly. Her father worked as a grazier, responsible for the care and feeding of sheep and cattle.

Not much is known about her childhood, but in rural Ireland, many families dependent on agriculture experienced hardship. The 1870s were a time of rising tensions over land reform and tenants rights. Due to flooding and lost crops, the years 1879 and 1880 were particularly difficult, with famine adding to political tensions.

== Religious vocation and nursing ==
As a young woman, Lynch attended a convent school run by the Sisters of Mercy in nearby Ballyjamesduff. Drawn to the religious life, Lynch decided to join the Little Company of Mary, a Catholic religious order founded by Mary Potter in 1877. The order's particular mission was to care for the sick and the dying, and the sisters were trained in nursing. Lynch moved to Rome, Italy, where Potter had established a mother house in 1882. Lynch joined the Little Company of Mary as a postulant on 1 April 1887. During her novitiate, she was supervised by Potter herself. After professing her final vows, she adopted her religious name, "Mary Francis Xavier". She also began wearing the order's blue habit; this distinctive dress earned members of the order the nickname of "Blue Nuns" or "Blue Sisters". Lynch received training as a nurse in Rome, and then worked in Rome, Fiesole and Florence, both in hospitals and in private homes.

Lynch remained at the mother house in Rome until 1894, when she was sent to establish a congregation of the order in Malta. She was joined by three other Blue Sisters; they were responding to the invitation of Archbishop Pietro Pace for skilled nurses to care for the ill. Lynch was appointed superior of the new convent. In 1898, a convent building to house the sisters was started; it was completed in 1901 and the top floor was used for a hospital.

== Leadership in Australia ==
In 1899, before the completion of the new building in Malta, Lynch was recalled to Rome by Mary Potter. Her leadership and administrative skills were needed for a new assignment. Potter asked Lynch to serve a six-month stint as visitor-general for the Australian congregation of the Little Company of Mary. A small group of sisters, under the leadership of Mother Mary Rafael Farrar, had arrived Sydney in 1885, accompanying Cardinal Patrick Moran, who was returning from a trip to Rome. They formed a convent in Lewisham, next to St Thomas Catholic Church. The sisters first founded the Children's Hospital of the Holy Child in 1889. A general hospital was begun on 7 August 1898. The order also managed the Mount St Margaret psychiatric hospital.

By 1899, tensions had arisen between the church hierarchy and the sisters, as well as within the community itself. Lynch was tasked with bringing about reconciliation. She arrived in Sydney on 21 August 1899. At the end of six months, she was appointed superintendent of the congregation.

For the next 40 years, Lynch oversaw management of the Lewisham Hospital. The facility served women and children in its early years, but in 1912 it began admitting male patients. Due in large part to Lynch's dedication and skilled administration, it came to be regarded as one of the best hospitals in Australia.

Lynch also increased the number of hospitals managed by the "Blue Sisters". In November 1899, upon the request of community leaders in North Adelaide, Lynch agreed to send sisters to manage the hospital there, which was in debt and in need of skilled nurses. In 1904, again responding to a request, she sent four sisters from her congregation to South Africa to establish a hospital in Port Elizabeth. In 1914, she established a new congregation in Christchurch, New Zealand, and opened a hospital there the following year.

Also in 1914, Lynch travelled to Rome to attend the first general chapter of the Little Company of Mary, occasioned by the death of the order's foundress, Mary Potter. Interested in maintaining the highest standards of care, Lynch went on to visit hospitals in England and the United States to learn more about current trends in nursing and hospital administration.

In 1922, the Little Company of Mary, having grown in size, formally established four separate provinces; Lynch was appointed provincial for the Australasian province. On 28 August 1924, a celebration was held to honour the 25th anniversary, or silver jubilee, of her arrival in Sydney. She travelled to Rome shortly thereafter to attend the election of the new Mother-General of the order.

In 1926, Lynch established a hospital in Wagga Wagga, New South Wales. In 1927, she oversaw the founding of a second hospital in New Zealand, in Wellington.

On 18 September 1927, Archbishop Michael Kelly officiated at the opening of the Maternal Heart Chapel in Lewisham Hospital. Lynch had led the effort to raise funds to establish the new chapel at the hospital.

== Death and legacy ==
Lynch retired due to ill health in 1929 and lived her last years at the sisters' home in Wollongong. She died on 7 June 1938, 50 years to the day from the opening of the Lewisham Hospital.

Upon her death, her body was brought to the Chapel of the Maternal Heart at Lewisham Hospital, where it was received by a choir of nuns and members of the clergy, including Thomas O'Shea, the Archbishop of Wellington, New Zealand, and Giovanni Panico, the apostolic delegate. The nuns kept vigil overnight, in keeping with Catholic tradition. On 9 June 1938, Archbishop O'Shea presided over a Solemn Requiem Mass in the chapel. The Very Reverend R. Macken gave the eulogy. In his remarks, he observed that "Australia is indebted to her more than any other for the growth and expansion of that great home of the healing known as Lewisham." The chapel, which seated 650, was filled to capacity.

After the Mass, a large funeral procession made its way to Rookwood Cemetery, where Lynch was buried with Catholic rites.

Countess Eileen Marie Freehill donated 5,000 Pounds to the Lewisham Hospital in memory of Lynch. Her husband, Colonel Francis Freehill, was secretary of the hospital for many years.

== See also ==
- Norah Martin
- Little Company of Mary Health Care (Australia)
- Nursing in Australia
