= Sisters of Finding Jesus in the Temple =

Catholic religious order

The Sisters of Finding Jesus in the Temple are a Catholic religious order popularly known as Blue nuns due to the colour of their habit. It was the name of a pre-Reformation Catholic order founded in London at the time of the crusades by an unknown dean. Their chief work is education. They also support care for the elderly and Catholic missions abroad.

A new order was founded in England in 1860 by Cardinal Wiseman and it subsequently spread to France. In England a center of their work was the Diocese of Clifton which they left in 2010. As of 2019, they still operated as a registered charity in England and Wales.

== See also ==
- Finding in the Temple
- Sisters of the Little Company of Mary
