= Louise Miles =

New Zealand care-giver (1918–2005)

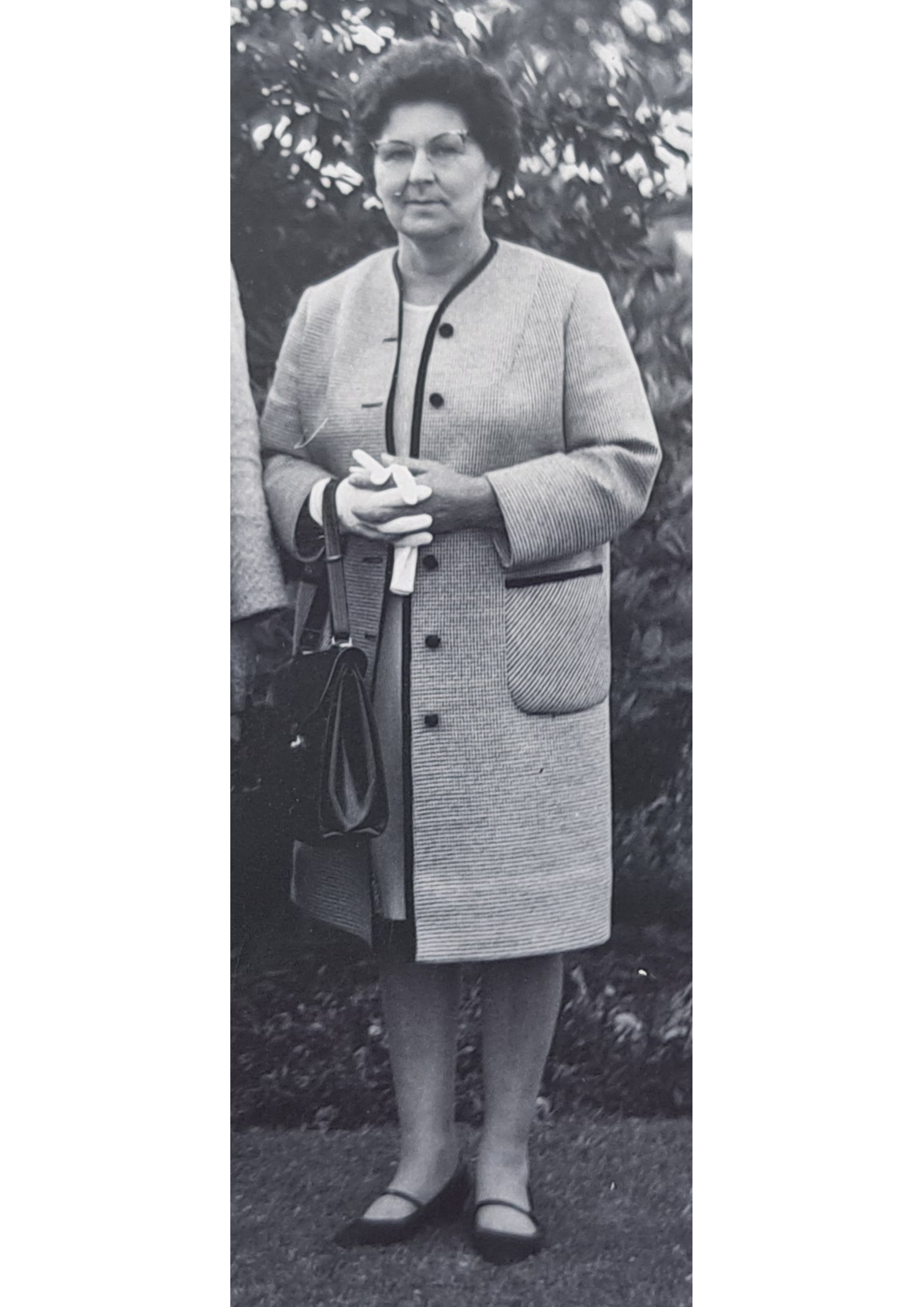
Louise Miles on the occasion of receiving the British Empire Medal 'for the care of handicapped children', c.1969.

Louise Miles (4 January 1918 – 26 December 2005) was a caretaker for disabled children in Christchurch, New Zealand.

== Biography ==
Born as Louisa Spencer on 4 January 1918, in Wellington, her father, Harry was a coal merchant and her mother, Mary-Ann (née Stewart), from Newtown, was a foster carer. By the time Louisa was 21, her mother had fostered 50 children. Louisa had five siblings, and was known within her family as Lou. She would later change her name to Louise at some point in the early 1960s.

On 6 February 1939, she married Ronald (Ron) Charles Miles (1914–1986), a Christchurch garage attendant. Ronald was the son of Christchurch carter Charles and Georgina Miles (née Giddy). From around 1946, the couple lived at 132 Aldwins Road, Phillipstown in Christchurch. Here they initially established a day-nursery, but it was unsuccessful, so they began taking in 'handicapped' 'permanent children boarders' (sic).

== Little Acre ==
=== Establishment ===
In 1958, Louise and Ronald purchased and moved into a 11-bedroom house at 226 Lincoln Road, Addington with their foster family of seven. This home became a care home for children, called 'Little Acre', known for taking in particularly disabled children. In December 1959, the home was described in detail in The Press newspaper, with Louise noted as being a mother of two and a 'foster mother to 57 children...children other people do not want'. By the time the care home vacated this house in 1973, the press reported that the Miles' were caring for 'more than 20 children from the age of two to 14', as well as 'eight retarded women in a home in Gerald Street'. The street is named incorrectly: the women lived in nearby Jerrold St (now renamed after street reconfiguration as 476 Barrington St). The residence at 226 Lincoln Road does not survive and the site is now part of the Raceway Motel.

From 1958 to 1971, Louise was on the committee of the Canterbury branch of the Epilepsy Association, initially as secretary-treasurer, and in 1964 as welfare officer.

=== Publicity, community fundraising and support (1959–1973) ===
Throughout the late 1950s, 1960s and 1970s Little Acre appears in the local newspapers as the recipient of much community goodwill and supplemental funding, with Louise regularly giving interviews to journalists and associated photographers. In this period, Louise was uncritically praised in the press for being 'gentle and sympathetic' and having 'mental empathy...with a high sensitivity for the physical and emotional states of the children' in her care, in her 'Home with a Special Touch'.

Inspired by this article, in September 1961, Christchurch Lions funded and relined a room in the house, where five bedrooms had been fire damaged before they moved in, and also built another room onto the front for the girls, which was painted 'coral and lime green' with a white ceiling. At this time there were 12 children being cared for at Little Acre.

In April 1964, as a 'disability organisation' Little Acre received 800 pounds from the proceeds of the national Golden Kiwi lottery, while in September 1970 the Canterbury University Engineering Society donated the $50 proceeds of a spring fashion show. A set of images taken by the Christchurch Star in 1971 show Louise outside the home with a number of children in her care around her. Little Acre received the proceeds of a 'Monster Auction' at Cashmere School in July 1972. The Red Cross donated parcels of clothing and toys to Little Acre in December 1972.

In December 1968, it was announced that a four-year-old child with Down Syndrome who lived at Little Acre, Tony Reilly, was chosen to front the 1969 Intellectually Handicapped Children (IHC) Appeal for funds. Tony's image appeared in newspapers under the headings 'Help a handicapped child grow up' and 'What will happen to me when I grow up?...Tony alone cannot answer this'. The IHC magazine of December 1968 also featured an article about Louise Miles who said that caring for 'handicapped children' was her 'private hobby' and that she had a 'gift' for it. The children are depicted making beds, playing with blocks, and using an electric floor polisher, to show that 'the children help with the work'. Louise Miles estimated that over the previous 25 years she had fostered 400 children, some as 'permanents', others for short stays. At this time she said she had 17 'permanents' ranging in age from 2 to 21. She mentions the house in Jerrold Street 'where seven girls she had bought up are living...and help her with the bathing and feeding of children' as well as working elsewhere. The children were attending Allenvale School, Sydenham Special School, and the Crippled Children's Craft Centre, and some were being schooled at Little Acre, although the teachers were not qualified: '...they know how to train the children well. The children all know how to co-operate'.

=== Move to Huntsbury House ===
On Saturday 24th March 1973, Little Acre moved into Huntsbury House in Cashmere, the former Fresh Air Home of the Cashmere Sanatorium, which had opened on 23 October 1923 to care for the children of the patients in nearby Coronation Hospital (also known as Cashmere Sanitorium). It had then evolved into the Huntsbury Children's Home from October 1956 to 1971, before Little Acre moved in. In a photograph taken by the Christchurch Star as Little Acre was about to move in to Huntsbury House, Louise is shown looking out over the balcony of the home, and also inspecting the kitchen with Valerie Joan Henry. The home had 60 beds and was maintained by the Presbyterian Social Service Association, who leased the building from the North Canterbury Hospital Board. A community group fundraised for furnishings. Louise was photographed outside the house surrounded by children on the occasion of the move, which was undertaken by volunteers from the local Rotary Club. The sign at the front of the home read 'Little Acre' in yellow writing overlain with sequins, on a blue background. In 1979, Louise Miles estimated that between 36 and 38 children were cared for here by the Miles' at any one time over the next seven years. In 1993, Huntsbury House was demolished along with the rest of the former Cashmere Sanitorium buildings to make way for a new development called Broad Oaks.

=== Publicity, community fundraising and support (1973–1979) ===
In June 1973, the Christchurch Garrison Band donated $150 from a concert at the Hillsborough Tavern to Little Acre. The Woolston Buffalo Lodge donated $150 to the home to 'help make Christmas brighter in December 1973.' In February 1974, the Miles' were presented with a large cheque for $3,000 from the United States Navy Antarctic Support force, where a broadcaster Al Bray had broken a record for a continuous radio show over Christmas at McMurdo Station. The couple were photographed with a 'shopping list'. In December of that year, a set of Christchurch Star photographs show a Father Christmas unveiling a colour television set for the children at Little Acre, also donated by the United States Navy Antarctic Support Force, along with gifts for the children . At some stage while at Huntsbury, Miles received as 'Teleflower award', presented with a large bunch of flowers by a child, as photographed by V.C. Browne.

A documentary about the children's home and Louise Miles' work was televised via the Broadcasting Corporation of New Zealand (BCNZ) in 1974, filmed in colour by local Christchurch company Robbins Recordings, and produced by Keith Robbins . It was called 'Four in the Morning: Handicapped Foster Children', which she said was the time she stayed up to, to care for the children. In this documentary Louise revealed that the name of the home was because the couple 'thought we had God's Little Acre, for it wasn't only us doing; God was always helping us'. She said 'I seem to have a gift for healing the handicapped. I think that loving them brings back something they're missing'.

The documentary shows the work needed to run the home, as well as the Miles' holiday home in Butler's Road, near Pleasant Point, beside the Ōpihi River, where the children were taken for holidays: they were filmed swimming in the river and eeling at night. The film also outlined the various ways the Miles' made money, such as buying used prams, furniture, and other items at auction, and repairing them for re-sale. A consignment of 600 pairs of shoes from a fire sale was sold to members of the public who flocked to Little Acre to purchase them, netting 300 pounds for the couple. Louise recounted that this money was used to buy an old yellow school bus, which they named 'The Mustard Pot'. She also described how 78 fowls would be purchased weekly, which would be plucked by hand at the home, dressed and sold on to hotels. Louise said she did dress-making for the children and smocking for a local business as well as knitting up to 80 skeins of wool each holiday period to produce woollen garments for the babies in the home. She also recounted how she darned socks for men at a hospital. The theme of the Miles' having little funds for Little Acre is repeated throughout the film. John Shaw, from Christchurch Presbyterian Social Services Association, said that the Miles 'were on the point of bankruptcy' when Huntsbury Home became vacant. Louise stated 'I had to be very crafty to keep these children. Sometimes I'd buy something at auction and put it in another auction at the same day with a reserve on it. We were determined not to take charity'.

In April 1974, the Miles were presented with a turquoise-coloured $4,000 14-seater Bedford van for the children, by the South Canterbury Jaycees. A large playhouse arrived in April 1976 from the president of the Christchurch Lions Club. In November 1977, Little Acre was one of the two recipients of funds from a City South Charity Auction, presented by local Radio Avon D. J. Murray Inglis. In December that year an anonymous Christchurch family gave gifts, including a trampoline, to the children at Little Acre as they were about to embark on their annual holiday camp at Pleasant Point. October 1978 saw a delegation of Associated Contract Cleaners donate their time to cleaning the home 'from top to bottom'.

=== Witness testimony to the Royal Commission of Inquiry into Abuse in Care ===
In 1962, a 6-month-old baby named Renée Grace (later Habluetzel) was taken into care at Little Acre and later adopted by Louise and Ronald Miles. In August 2022 she gave witness testimony to the Royal Commission of Inquiry into Abuse in Care, set up on 1 February 2018 to understand what happened to children, young people and adults in State care and in the care of faith-based institutions in Aotearoa New Zealand between 1950 and 1999.

In her testimony Renée described what happened to her and other children over 17 years at Little Acre. She appears in the 1974 documentary 'Four in the Morning' as 'a willing helper', and is shown distributing meals in the dining room, holding babies and peeling potatoes. She recounted being severely beaten and abused by Louise Miles throughout her life there: 'she terrorised us but she was held up as a beacon of compassion'. Renée cites Miles as being 'the most evil person I have ever met... [s]he was so cruel to the most vulnerable people – not just me but hundreds of children...she was a monster'. She said that '[d]isabled children are so vulnerable, and the fact I'm the only person to come forward from the place I grew up isn't surprising, because Mrs. Miles got people she could shut up'. Forced to work cleaning and caring for both Louise Miles and the younger children, Renée stayed at Little Acre until 1978, after which she escaped and attempted to alert authorities about the abuse at Little Acre on several occasions.

The Royal Commission of Inquiry into Abuse in Care noted 'that Presbyterian Support South Island commissioned an independent investigation into the allegations made [about Little Acre] between 2005 and 2007 [after Louise Miles' death, and the demolition of both Little Acre sites] but they were unable to be corroborated. The matter was also referred to the New Zealand Police and no charges were laid'.

=== "Little Acre: The friendly children's home run by a 'monster'" ===
On 16 November 2024, an extensively detailed investigation titled "Little Acre: The friendly children's home run by a 'monster'" was published in Christchurch newspaper The Press in its Mainlander section. Written by senior features writer Charlie Mitchell, it included interviews with three survivors of Little Acre: Renée Habluetzel, a woman known only as Christine, and a man with the pseudonym 'Jack'. The interviews with Christine and 'Jack' corroborated Renée's testimony provided to the Royal Commission of Inquiry into Abuse in Care, recounting seeing and/or experiencing regular beatings, kicking, hair-pulling, prolonged chest-deep cold baths with their heads held under the water, humiliation, theft and starvation at the hand of Louise Miles, who 'gathered up children like she collected dolls'.

Mitchell writes that, 'like the castle at the centre of Disneyland, Little Acre was a facade, a beautiful edifice that was hollow inside...enabled by a system that ignored obvious warning signs, one that fell under the spell of a woman who sold herself as the kind face of institutionalisation'. Barry Helem, co-chief executive of Presbyterian Support, who had oversight of the home, told Mitchell that the organisation had not kept detailed records on Little Acre 'as it had been common practice to destroy documents every decade or so', and that what Miles had done to the children in her care was 'deplorable, it's abuse, and even by the standards of the 1960s it should not have been tolerated.' Mitchell reported that while Presbyterian Support wants to help the survivors of Little Acre 'on the pathway to healing, it is still figuring out what that entails.'

For 'Jack', who was beaten, locked under the house, starved and shamed for wetting the bed, 'I was always trying to fight for my life...the abuse was unreal'. Jack's family was dissuaded by Miles from visiting: '[h]is mother was only allowed to visit when he was asleep'. Christine recounted the way Miles exploited her, and a group of other disabled female care-givers (known at the time in the press as 'retarded women'), as unpaid slaves to care for the children, rising at 5.30am to 'get several disabled kids fed, toileted and medicated'. She then went to work in a local factory for the day, returning to feed, medicate and put the children to bed. Miles controlled her finances, discouraged her education and limited her activity until she escaped at the age of 28. Mitchell also interviewed a disabled full-time care-giver at Little Acre, Valerie Joan Henry, who loved and cared for Renée and 'Jack' as a mother would, providing badly needed comfort and affection. Renée told Mitchell that after she escaped from Little Acre, '[t]he ongoing grief for me was the loss of people like her in my life...Valerie Joan should have got the British Empire Medal'.

On 8 March 2025, Rosa Smith's traumatic experience over 18 years at Little Acre was published in The Press. She was interviewed from her home in Brisbane by Charlie Mitchell. Rosa arrived at Little Acre at the age of two, and left at 20, and shared the same types of experiences as Renee, 'Jack' and Christine. Her head was banged into corners of doorways by Louise Miles, leaving scars, and she was 'forced into physical labour from a young age'. '[Louise Miles] wasn't just violently abusive with her hands', Rosa said 'she was sadistically abusive with her mouth and her mind.'

== Award ==
In the 1969 Birthday Honours Louise Miles was awarded the British Empire Medal 'for the care of handicapped children.' As Stephen Winter wrote in an article in The Conversation, called 'Survivors of abuse in care know how redress should work – will the government finally listen?', Prime Minister Christopher Luxon announced on 12 November 2024 at the Crown's apology to survivors of state and faith-based care that honours of 'proven perpetrators' would be removed.

'What this means is unclear. Many abusers are dead, others are too old to be brought to trial. At present, there may be no mechanism to rescind honours posthumously, leaving alleged serial abusers such as Louise Miles undisturbed.'

== Retirement ==
In December 1978, Louise Miles was reported as suffering from ill-health, which was forcing her to retire. In February 1979, Louise and Ronald Miles closed Little Acre, and left Christchurch for Tauranga, taking six children and a foster daughter with them. The press reported on a farewell community luncheon at St Martin's Church, Christchurch on 23 February, at which Louise estimated that she had cared for more than 500 children over 40 years.

== Death ==
Louise Miles died on 26 December 2005, aged 87. Ronald Miles died in Tauranga on 19 June 1986 aged 72.
