= Calvary Riverina Hospital =

Coordinates: 35°7′9.63″S 147°21′9.64″E

- Little Company of Mary Health Care
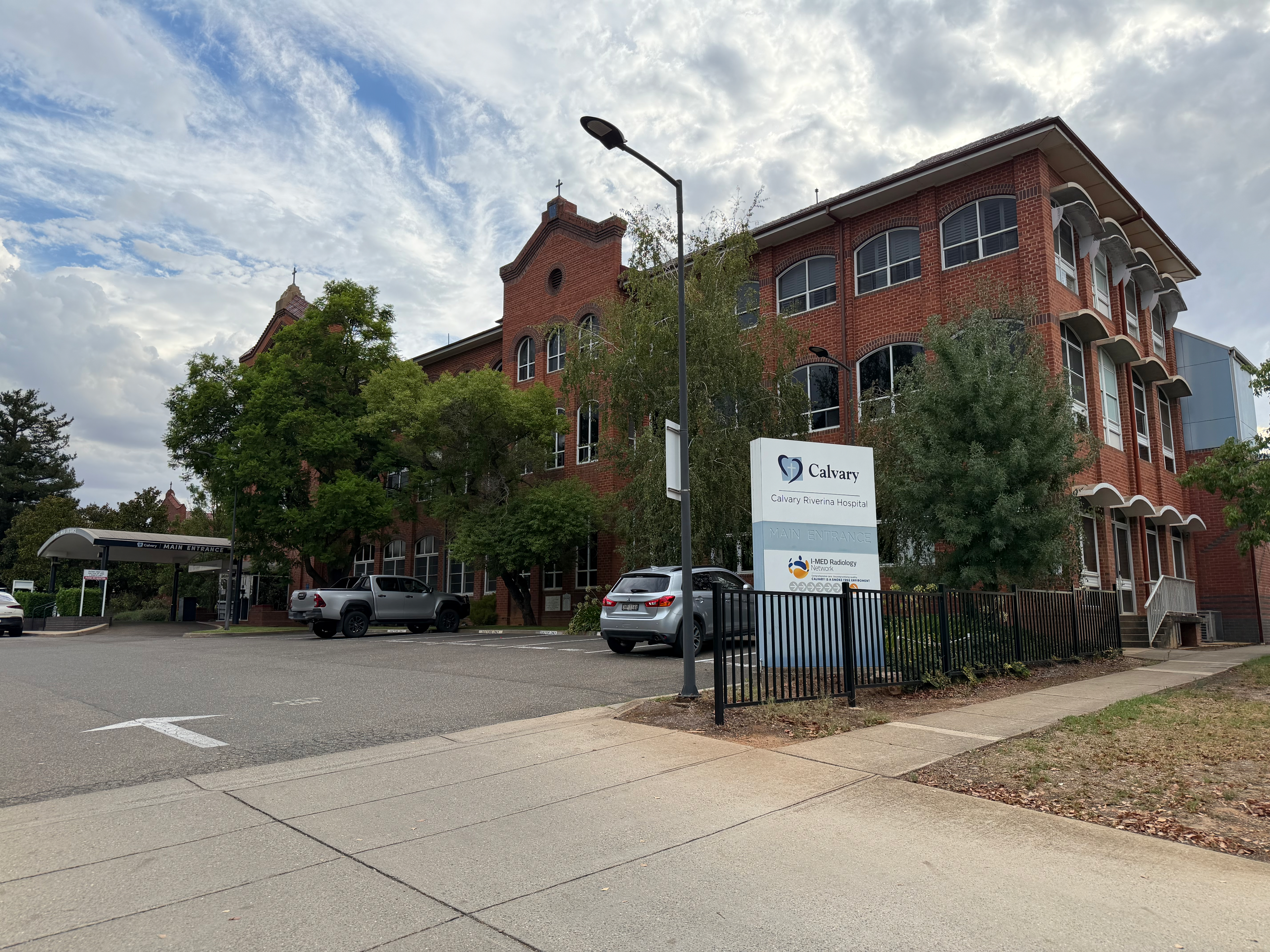
- in February 2026

Geography
- Location: Hardy Avenue, Wagga Wagga, New South Wales, Australia

Organisation
- Care system: Private Health Insurance
- Type: Private Hospital
- Affiliated university: Notre Dame University Australia

Services
- Beds: 121

History
- Founded: 1926

Links
- Website: www.calvarycare.org.au/hospitals/calvary-riverina-hospital
- Lists: Hospitals in Australia

Calvary Riverina Hospital is a private hospital in Wagga Wagga, New South Wales, Australia. The hospital was founded in 1926 by the Sisters of the Little Company of Mary and was originally known as Lewisham Hospital. The hospital later became part of the Calvary Health Care network and is operated by Little Company of Mary Health Care, a Catholic not-for-profit healthcare organisation.

== History ==
Lewisham Hospital was established in Wagga Wagga in 1926 to serve the health needs of the Riverina region and was operated by the Sisters of the Little Company of Mary. Over time, the hospital expanded and became part of the Calvary Health Care network, reflecting the broader growth of Catholic healthcare services in regional New South Wales.

== Services ==
Calvary Riverina Hospital provides acute medical, surgical and maternity services to the Riverina community.

The hospital operates alongside the Calvary Riverina Surgicentre and the Calvary Riverina Drug and Alcohol Centre, both managed by Calvary Health Care. The Drug and Alcohol Centre provides inpatient withdrawal management, residential rehabilitation and community-based recovery programs for individuals affected by substance use.

The hospital provides specialist palliative care services and maintains links with hospice and community-based palliative care providers through regional palliative care networks.

== Facilities ==
According to Calvary Health Care, Calvary Riverina Hospital includes multiple operating theatres across two campuses, intensive care and coronary care units, dedicated maternity facilities, and a range of diagnostic and support services including radiology, pathology and cancer care. Independent regional health service directories also describe the hospital as providing intensive care, obstetrics, rehabilitation and specialist medical services.
