= Calvary Hospital, Hobart =

Hospital in Tasmania, Australia

Calvary Lenah Valley Hospital
- Little Company of Mary Health Care

Geography
- Location: Lenah Valley, Hobart, Tasmania, Australia
- Coordinates: 42°51′58″S 147°18′14″E

Organisation
- Care system: Private
- Funding: Not-for-profit
- Type: General

Services
- Emergency department: Yes
- Beds: 400

History
- Opened: March 15, 1899

Links
- Website: www.calvarycare.org.au/hospitals/calvary-lenah-valley-hospital-hobart
- Lists: Hospitals in Australia

Calvary Lenah Valley Hospital is a Catholic not-for-profit private hospital located in Lenah Valley, Hobart, Tasmania, Australia. It operates as part of Little Company of Mary Health Care, commonly known as Calvary Health Care. The hospital is the largest private hospital in Tasmania, providing surgical, maternity, intensive care and emergency services.

== History ==
Calvary Lenah Valley Hospital was founded by the Sisters of the Little Company of Mary. Construction of the Lenah Valley campus commenced in 1938, and the hospital officially opened in 1940 as Calvary Hospital, Lenah Valley.

The hospital’s origins date back to 1899, when the Homoeopathic Hospital opened in South Hobart. This facility later became St John’s Hospital and formed part of Calvary’s broader historical development in Tasmania.

Over subsequent decades, Calvary Lenah Valley Hospital has undergone extensive redevelopment, including the expansion of operating theatres, maternity and birthing suites, and critical care facilities.

In August 2024, the hospital’s emergency department resumed full-time operations after reduced hours caused by staffing shortages in the healthcare sector.

In 2025, Calvary Lenah Valley Hospital expanded its maternity services following the closure of Hobart Private Hospital’s maternity unit. Annual birth capacity increased from approximately 350 to 900 births. Calvary reported recruiting around 80% of midwives displaced by the Hobart Private Hospital closure. The Australian Government provided $6 million in joint funding to Calvary Lenah Valley Hospital and the Royal Hobart Hospital to support maternity service expansion and facility upgrades.

Calvary Health Care operates three other hospitals in Tasmania:

- Calvary St John’s Hospital, South Hobart
- Calvary St Luke’s Hospital, Launceston
- Calvary St Vincent’s Hospital, Launceston

== Facilities and services ==
Calvary Lenah Valley Hospital offers a comprehensive range of services, including:

- 24-hour private Emergency department
- Cardiac centre and Cardiothoracic surgery services
- Critical care and Intensive care unit units
- Maternity and birthing suites
- Endoscopy and day surgery units
- Orthopaedics, Neurosurgery, Urology, Gynaecology and General surgery
- Disability services, including the SHAID Clinic (Specialised Health Care for Adults with Intellectual Disabilities)
- On-site pharmacy, radiology (CT, MRI and Nuclear medicine) and pathology
- Palliative care and home care support
- Allied health services, including Physiotherapy, Occupational therapy and Dietetics

== Affiliations ==
The hospital operates under Little Company of Mary Health Care (Calvary Health Care) and maintains links with other Calvary hospitals across Tasmania.

== Controversies ==
In April 2024, Calvary Lenah Valley Hospital faced public scrutiny following allegations of sexual misconduct involving a practising doctor. The hospital cooperated with authorities and implemented additional patient safety measures.

In 2018, a patient publicly criticised the hospital following complications arising from a colonoscopy procedure, citing delays in communication and inconsistent information during the complaint process.

== Sustainability initiatives ==
Calvary Lenah Valley Hospital participates in the Tasmanian GreenMed program, which aims to reduce medical waste through the recycling of plastics and other materials generated by healthcare facilities.
