= Little Company of Mary =

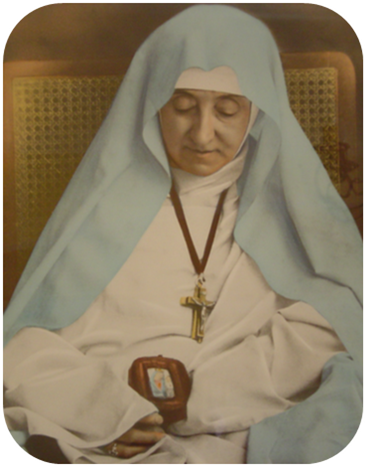
Venerable Mary Potter

The Little Company of Mary, also known as the Blue Sisters, is a Catholic religious institute of women dedicated to caring for the suffering, the sick, and the dying. The order was founded in 1877 in Nottingham, England by Mary Potter.

== History ==
The Little Company of Mary began in 1877, in an abandoned factory in Hyson Green, Nottingham. Their principal work was the care of the sick and dying. Their charism was based on the idea that Mary was at the foot of the Cross at the Crucifixion. In a similar way, the Company seeks to accompany the sick and dying.

In 1882, they went to Italy. Mary Potter had gone to gain approval for the constitutions of her new congregation, and while there she established Calvary Hospital on the Via Santo Stefano Rotondo, not far from St. John Lateran.

In 1885, at the request of Cardinal Francis Moran in Sydney, Australia, six sisters traveled by ship to Australia, establishing a community there. Under the leadership of Mother Mary Xavier Lynch, the first provincial for Australasia, the order grew and established numerous hospitals in Australia and New Zealand. She also oversaw the founding of a hospital in Port Elizabeth, South Africa. In 1888, the sisters expanded their work to Ireland.

In 1893, three Little Company of Mary sisters arrived in Chicago to begin their ministry in the United States, providing home-based hospice care. In 1930 Little Company of Mary Hospital was founded in Evergreen Park, Illinois. As of 2019, there were sisters working in California, Illinois, Indiana and Ohio. Their healthcare ministries include hospitals, home care, hospice, extended care, and outreach programs.

By 1922, the Little Company of Mary congregation had grown large enough to establish provinces with regional provincials. The four provinces were Australasia, England, Ireland, and Italy.

== Modern day ==
The Little Company of Mary is currently present and operational in Australia, New Zealand, Tonga, Ireland, Italy, South Africa, South Korea, Philippines, United Kingdom, United States of America, and Zimbabwe. They continue to assist in healthcare in these countries, as well as praying and accompanying them during their illness.

In Australia, the congregation's health, aged care and community ministries are administered through Little Company of Mary Health Care, which operates nationally under the trading name Calvary Health Care. Established as the corporate arm of the Little Company of Mary Sisters, Calvary provides hospital services, specialist health services, residential aged care, retirement living communities and home care services across several Australian states and territories.

== See also ==
- Little Company of Mary Health Care (Australia)
- Sisters of Finding Jesus in the Temple
