= Little Company of Mary Health Care (Australia) =

Catholic hospital network in Australia

The Little Company of Mary Health Care (trading as Calvary Health Care) is a Catholic not-for-profit health, aged-care and community-care organisation in Australia. It forms part of the ministry founded by the Sisters of the Little Company of Mary, an international religious congregation established in 1877 by Venerable Mary Potter. Calvary operates public and private hospitals, residential aged care homes, retirement living communities and home care services across several Australian states and territories.

== History and mission ==
The Little Company of Mary was founded in Nottingham, England, in 1877 by Mary Potter in a former stocking factory provided by Bishop Edward Bagshawe. Her aim was to care for those who were sick, dying or otherwise vulnerable, combining prayer with nursing and social service.

At Potter’s direction, six Sisters of the Little Company of Mary sailed to Sydney aboard the SS Liguria, arriving on 4 November 1885. They began home nursing and social work in the inner suburbs, operating soup kitchens and shelters for women and children.

Within four years they opened the Children’s Hospital of the Holy Child at Lewisham (1889), later renamed Lewisham Hospital.

Over subsequent decades the Sisters founded further hospitals and aged-care facilities throughout Australia, including Calvary North Adelaide Hospital (1900), Calvary Wagga Wagga (1926) and Calvary Bethlehem in Melbourne (1941).

In 1997 the Sisters established Little Company of Mary Health Care Limited to ensure continuity of their ministries. In 2011, canonical stewardship passed to a new body, Calvary Ministries, recognised by the Holy See to continue the work of the Little Company of Mary in Australia. Calvary identifies its core values as healing, hospitality, stewardship and respect, drawn from Potter’s original vision.

== Hospitals ==
As of 2025, Calvary operates 17 hospital and specialist health facilities across five states and territories, including both public and private hospitals.

Australian Capital Territory

- Calvary Bruce Private Hospital – Bruce (private)
- Calvary John James Hospital – Deakin (private)

New South Wales

- Calvary Mater Newcastle – Waratah (public)
- Calvary Riverina Hospital – Wagga Wagga (private)
- Calvary Riverina Surgicentre – Wagga Wagga (private)
- Calvary Riverina Drug and Alcohol Centre – Wagga Wagga (public)

South Australia

- Calvary Adelaide Hospital – Adelaide (private)
- Calvary Central Districts Hospital – Elizabeth Vale (private)
- Calvary North Adelaide Hospital – North Adelaide (private)

Tasmania

- Calvary Lenah Valley Hospital – Lenah Valley (private)
- Calvary St John’s Hospital – South Hobart (private)
- Calvary St Luke’s Hospital – Launceston (private)
- Calvary St Vincent’s Hospital – Launceston (private)

Victoria

- Calvary Health Care Bethlehem – Caulfield South (public)

== Specialist health facilities ==
- Hyson Green Mental Health – Bruce (private)
- Calvary Connery Centre – Elizabeth Vale (private)
- Calvary Health Care Kogarah – Kogarah (private)

== Aged care homes ==
As of 2025, Calvary operates 57 residential aged care homes across Australia, offering nursing, dementia and respite care. These facilities are located in the Australian Capital Territory, New South Wales, South Australia, Victoria and Tasmania.

== Retirement living communities ==
As of 2025, Calvary manages 17 retirement living communities across New South Wales, Victoria, South Australia, Tasmania and the Australian Capital Territory. These communities are often co-located with Calvary’s aged-care campuses to provide a continuum of accommodation and support.

== Home care services ==
As of 2025, Calvary’s home care network comprises 17 service centres across Australia, delivering nursing, personal care, respite and allied-health support for older people and those living with chronic illness.

== Recognition ==
In 2025, Calvary Health Care was named Australia's most attractive employer and healthcare brand in the Randstad Employer Brand Research Awards, recognising its workforce engagement and community reputation.
