= Integrated ticketing =

Transport ticketing system

Integrated ticketing enables a journey involving transfers within or between different modes of transportation using a single payment method that is valid for the entire journey. These modes include buses, trains, subways, and ferries, among others. The purpose of integrated ticketing is to promote public transport use by simplifying transitions between different modes and improving service efficiency.

However, even with integrated ticketing, using another mode or operator on the same trip may require payment of another fare. While it is a prerequisite for fare integration (a higher level of integration where different modes or operators are unified under one fare system and accept transfers between the two) simply using the same ticketing system does not necessarily indicate using the same fares and transfers. For instance, San Francisco Bay Area uses the Clipper card as merely a unified ticketing system for the region, where all operators accept the same card but (mostly) charge their own fares for each trip when moving between modes or operators, while Seattle's ORCA card offers unlimited transfers between modes and operators for two hours per trip.

In many instances, integrated ticketing is facilitated through electronic ticketing technologies such as magnetic stripe cards, smart cards or contactless smart card. Some smart card systems, such as Hong Kong’s Octopus card and Tokyo's Suica, are also used for payments beyond transportation, including goods and services. While electronic methods are prevalent, certain public transport systems still utilize paper tickets, which permit transfers within a specified area or, in some cases, allow unlimited travel during designated periods, as seen with the Transperth FamilyRider in Australia.

Countries such as Switzerland have established national integrated ticketing systems that extend beyond transportation to include access to leisure destinations, museums, and other services. Other nations, such as the United Kingdom, Australia, and Sweden, have implemented similar systems within major cities and metropolitan areas.

The successful implementation of integrated ticketing requires extensive coordination and cooperation among public transport providers and technology suppliers. Political, technological, and project management challenges have contributed to significant delays in some projects. For example, the system in Sydney required a restart, and in Dublin, the project faced substantial delays after its initiation in 2002, with the TFI Leap Card system launching in December 2011. Similarly, the process of replacing magnetic stripe cards with smart cards in Stockholm took several years, nearing completion after a project initiated in 2002.

== Examples ==
Examples of integrated ticketing around the world:

=== Asia Pacific ===
Area	Transport authority	System name	Ticket type	Operational since	Transport types	Comment
Adelaide	Adelaide Metro	MetroCARD	Smart card	November 2012	Buses, trains & trams	
Auckland	Auckland Transport	AT HOP card	Smart card	27 October 2012	Buses, ferries & trains	
Auckland	Auckland Transport	Snapper card	Smart card	2011	Buses (NZ Bus-operated services only)	To be phased out from April 2013
Canberra	Transport Canberra	MyWay	Smart card	February 2011	Buses, light rail	
Jakarta	PT Jakarta Lingko Indonesia	Jak Lingko	Smart card	December 2017	Commuter rail, LRT, MRT, BRT, Angkot	
Kuala Lumpur	Land Public Transport Commission	Touch 'n Go	Smart card	1997	Commuter rail, LRT, MRT, monorail, BRT, buses, parking, toll fare	
Melbourne	Public Transport Victoria	myki	Smart card	2009	Buses, trains, trams & restricted regional rail services	Replaced the Metcard system in the Melbourne metro area in 2012
Perth	Transperth	SmartRider	Smart card	January 2007	Buses, ferries & trains	Replaced the MultiRider magnetic stripe card system. Paper tickets are also available. SmartRider is also available for use in Bunbury, Busselton, Geraldton & Kalgoorlie
Singapore	Land Transport Authority	EZ-Link	Smart card	2001	MRT (subway), bus, parking	CEPAS-compliant EZ-Link cards have replaced original EZ-Link cards in 2009
South East Queensland	Translink	go card	Smart card	January 2008	Buses, ferries, trams & trains	
Sydney	Transport for NSW	Opal card	Smart card	December 2012	Buses, ferries, light rail, trains	
Tokyo	JR East	Suica	Smart card	November 2001	Buses, trains, subway, monorail	

=== Europe ===
Area	Transport authority	System name	Ticket type	Operational since	Transport types	Comment
Netherlands	Trans Link Systems	OV-chipkaart	Smart card	2002	All public transport on the Dutch mainland (trains, metros, trams, buses, ferries, ships, etc.)	The OV-chipkaart was launched in 2002 but only fully replaced the national strippenkaart of the 1980s for buses, trams, and metro trains in 2011, and the paper ticket system for rail travel in July 2014. In 2022, a new system has been gradually rolled out called OVpay, which allows travellers to also use their bank cards, smartphones and smartwatches in addition to the already existing smart card to use the public transportation system.
Greater Dublin Area	National Transport Authority	TFI Leap Card	Smart card	2011	Buses, trains, LUAS and the future Metro	* Integrated ticketing not currently available. Journeys involving change of bus or transfer from Luas/DART/Bus are charged as separate journeys
Greater London	TfL	Oyster card	Smart card	July 2003	Bus, tube, trams, DLR, London Overground & most National Rail services	
Greater London	TfL	Travelcard	Magnetic stripe ticket, or loaded into an Oyster card	May 1983	Bus, tube, trams, DLR, London Overground & most National Rail services	
Greater Stockholm	SL	SL-kort	Smart card	May 2022	Buses, Metro, rail, tram, ferries	Replaced the SL Access smart card system.
Lombardy (Italian region)	Regione Lombardia	Io Viaggio Ovunque	Paper ticket / magnet-electronic paper ticket (SBME) / smart card (Io Viaggio)	2011	for travel on the entire local public transport network in the region of Lombardy: urban, suburban and intercity buses, trams, subways/metro, regional trains, boats (on Lake Iseo only), and more	1 to 7 days tickets can be purchased by anyone; monthly and more long have different features, and require subscription that provides / enable personal smart card.
Northern Ireland	Translink	Smartlink	Smart card	October 2009	Bus in Belfast, Bus in Derry, regional & intercity bus, Railways services	
Paris	RATP/SNCF	Navigo pass, Mobilis/Jeunes one-day tickets	Smart card / magnetic ticket	2006	Subway, commuter rail (RER and Transilien), tramway, bus	
Switzerland	Swiss Federal Railways	Swiss Pass	Magnetic stripe card	1989	Buses, trains, ships and tramways	See also: Fare zones of Zurich
Prague and Central Bohemia	ROPID	Pražská integrovaná doprava		1991		
Subotica	Subotica-Trans	SuBus	Smart card	2012	Buses	

=== North America ===
Area	Transport authority	System name	Ticket type	Operational since	Transport types	Comment
Greater Toronto Area	Metrolinx	Presto card	Smart card	2009	Subway, commuter rail (GO Transit), tramways, buses	
San Francisco Bay Area	Metropolitan Transportation Commission	Clipper card	Smart card	2010	Subway (BART), commuter rail (Caltrain, SMART), light rail (Muni Metro, VTA light rail), ferries (Golden Gate Ferry, San Francisco Bay Ferry), cable car, buses, bikeshare (Bay Wheels)	Some modes and operators do offer discounted fares for transfers from another, but it the exception not the norm. Some services do not use Clipper despite serving the bay area, such as the ACE commuter trains.

== See also ==
- Automated fare collection
- List of smart cards
- Sustainable transport
- Fare integration
