= SmartRider =

Contactless ticketing system in Western Australia

- Location: Western Australia
- Launched: 2007
- Manager: Public Transport Authority
- Currency: AUD (A$256 maximum load)
- Credit expiry: Never
- Auto recharge: Autoload
- Validity: Transperth; TransAlbany; TransBunbury; TransBusselton; TransGeraldton; TransGoldfields; TransKarratha; TransHedland; TransEsperance
- Retailed: Transperth InfoCentre; Authorised retail outlets; SmartRider Hubs
- Website: www.transperth.wa.gov.au/SmartRider

SmartRider is the contactless electronic ticketing system of the Public Transport Authority of Western Australia. The system uses RFID smartcard technology to process public transport fares across public train, bus and ferry services.

The system is widely used across the Transperth public transport network in metropolitan Perth, as well as regional town bus services in TransAlbany, TransBunbury, TransBusselton, TransEsperance, TransGeraldton, TransHedland, TransGoldfields, TransKarratha, and TransCarnarvon in Western Australian regional centres. SmartRider is not used for ticketing on Transwa train and coach services but can be recognised as proof of entitlement to concession fares, including for coach travel on South West Coach Lines.

The SmartRider is a credit card-sized physical smartcard incorporating a microchip and internal aerial, allowing the smartcard to communicate with processors located at Transperth railway stations, on Transperth ferries, and on Transperth and regional town bus services. The microchip enables value to be loaded onto the card, as well as allowing the journey details to be recorded and the appropriate fare deducted from the stored value on the card.

The SmartRider system is designed so that passengers can "tag on" and "tag off" any services whenever they travel through the public transport network. As of 2020–21, 78.9% of all fare-paying boardings were made using a SmartRider.

== History ==
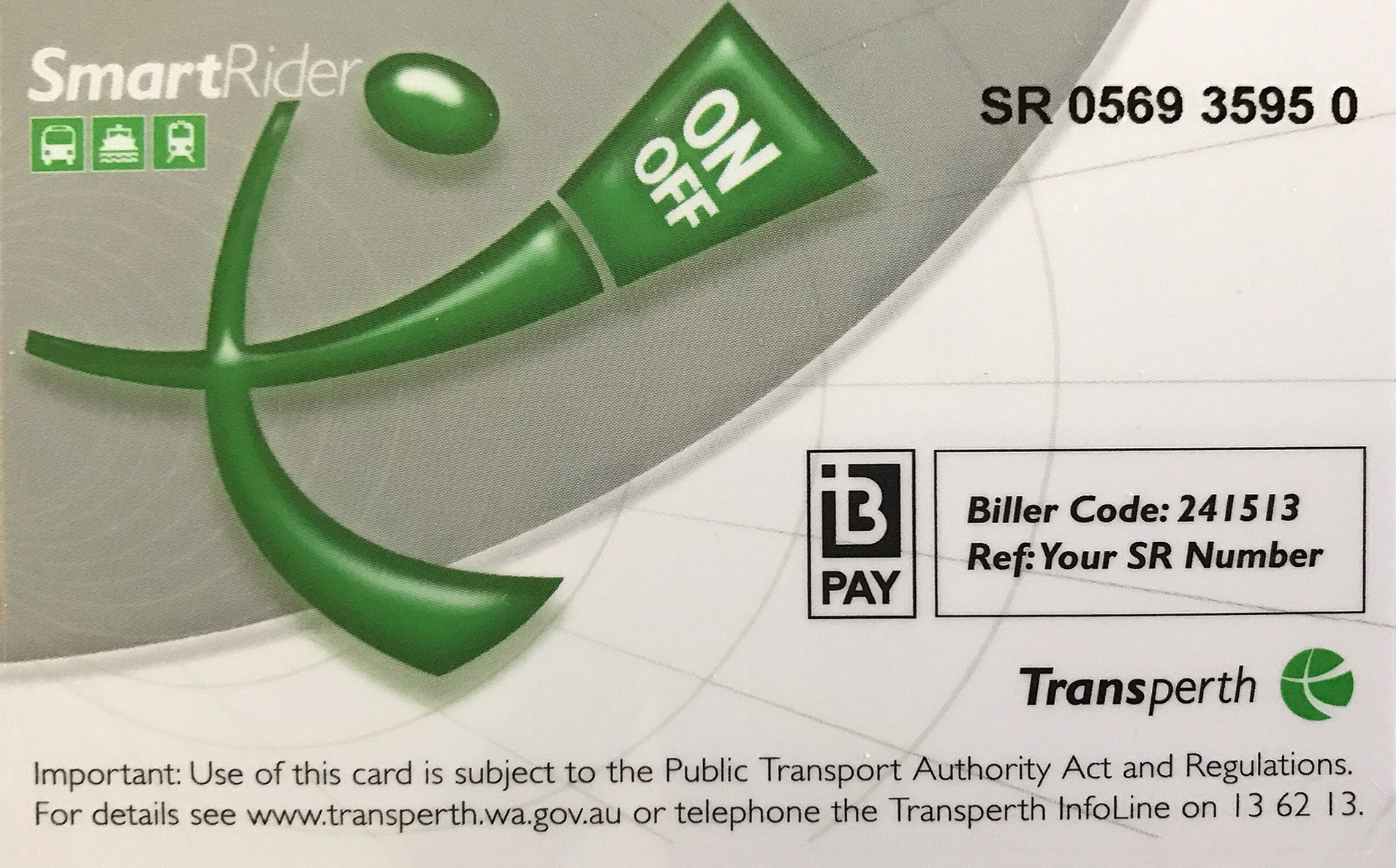
Typical SmartRider physical smartcard

In July 2003, a consortium comprising Delairco Bartrol and Wayfarer Transit Systems was named as the preferred bidder to deliver a smartcard ticketing system to Perth. The roll-out of SmartRider was originally planned for January to be completed in 2005, but due to problems with the implementation of reader technology, the key dates changed several times. SmartRiders became available to all members of the public from 14 January 2007, but rolled out progressively to different groups of customers:

- Trial users: A small group of passengers travelling through Stirling railway station participated in the initial trial in May 2004.
- Control group: 2,000 passengers from key user groups were invited to test the system. Initially, the Control Group trial was to last for four weeks; however, participants were subsequently asked to continue using their cards until the full roll-out (from 16 October 2005).
- Expanded control group: 5,000 more passengers joined the Control Group to test this system under load (from 23 January 2006).
- Seniors: New Western Australian Seniors' Cards were issued with integrated SmartRiders in May 2006.
- Secondary students: Students were issued ID cards with integrated SmartRiders in 2005. Secondary school students began using the system on 16 July 2006.
- Tertiary students: Tertiary SmartRider became available for University of Western Australia students from 16 July 2006, and all full-time tertiary students from 4 November 2006.
- Primary students: Students were issued ID cards with integrated SmartRiders in 2005. Primary school students began using the system on 1 October 2006. The 50 cents Student MultiRiders were phased out afterward.
- TravelEasy subscribers: The members of the TravelEasy online service were able to obtain the SmartRider card from 13 December 2006, before it was made available to the public.
- General public: SmartRiders were made available to the entire population when the MultiRider system was phased out and subsequently withdrawn from use on 8 April 2007.
- Car parking: From 22 October to 4 November 2007, new Pay'n'Display machines were trialled at the Stirling Interchange car park so that SmartRider users can pay for their parking with their SmartRider. This facility extended to 13 other stations on the network. From July 2014, SmartRider was made available to pay for parking at all Transperth railway stations when compulsory paid parking was implemented. At the same time, SmartParker was launched, enabling car license plates to be linked to a SmartRider account, removing the requirement to display a parking ticket.
- TransRegional: SmartRider was introduced on TransRegional bus services starting with TransGeraldton in March 2009, before gradually rolling out to TransBusselton, TransBunbury, TransGoldfields, and TransAlbany. TransKarratha, TransHedland, TransEsperance, and TransCarnarvon were also added to the SmartRider system later.

For much of the control group testing, Transperth offered full or partial fare refunds to prevent software problems causing overcharging.

== Payment types ==
=== SmartRider ===
A range of physical SmartRider smartcards exist. When a SmartRider is first purchased, a purchase fee of A$5 for concession users and A$10 for standard users will apply, on top of which credit needs to be added to the SmartRider to use it.

- Standard SmartRider is for use by passengers without concessions. Standard Transperth adult fares apply.
- Concession SmartRider is for use by passengers entitled to a concession, such as disability pension recipients, the unemployed and holders of health care cards. Standard Transperth concession fares apply.
- Seniors SmartRider is for use by passengers over the age of 60, and is part of the Western Australian Seniors Card, which provides reduced-cost access to a range of government services. From 4 April 2009, Seniors SmartRider holders are permitted to free travel during off-peak hours on weekdays and all weekends and public holidays. The concession fare applies during peak hours. The Seniors SmartRider was fully implemented from August 2006.
- Student SmartRider is for use by primary and secondary school students, and acts as a student identification card as it includes student details such as name, date of birth and student number. Cardholders are entitled to a special student fare during school periods, and standard Transperth concession fares during other periods.
- Tertiary SmartRider is for use by full-time TAFE and university students, who must, before purchasing, apply for a concession through their institution. The Tertiary SmartRider was fully implemented for university students on 4 November 2006.
- Pensioners SmartRider is a new SmartRider card that was introduced alongside the weekdays free travel entitlements.

A minimum credit of A$10 must be added in addition to the purchase fee. The SmartRider has a maximum credit limit of A$256.

=== Contactless payments ===
In 2018, the Government of Western Australia announced that A$34 million was set aside in the state budget to replace SmartRider with a new system. The new system was anticipated to go live in 2021, with the government considering contactless payment and mobile payment integration.

The 2021-22 state budget also allocated A$15 million to upgrade SmartRider as part of an overall A$57.8 million system revamp. This revamp included the option for commuters to tag on and tag off using a credit card, debit card or mobile device.

More than 4200 new SmartRider readers and add-value machines were installed in 2025. The new readers began accepting contactless Mastercard and Visa credit and debit cards, including those in digital wallets, on 8 December 2025.

== Fares ==
The system was originally split into nine concentric zones, radiating out from the centre of Perth. Zone one extended 8 kilometres (5.0 mi) from the centre of Perth, zones two and three consisted of bands 9 kilometres (5.6 mi) wide, and the remaining zones consisted of bands 10 kilometres (6.2 mi) wide. In 2021, a two-zone fare cap was introduced by the McGowan government. In 2026, a A$3.50 "Go Anywhere" fare was introduced, thus abolishing the zone system.

== Operation ==
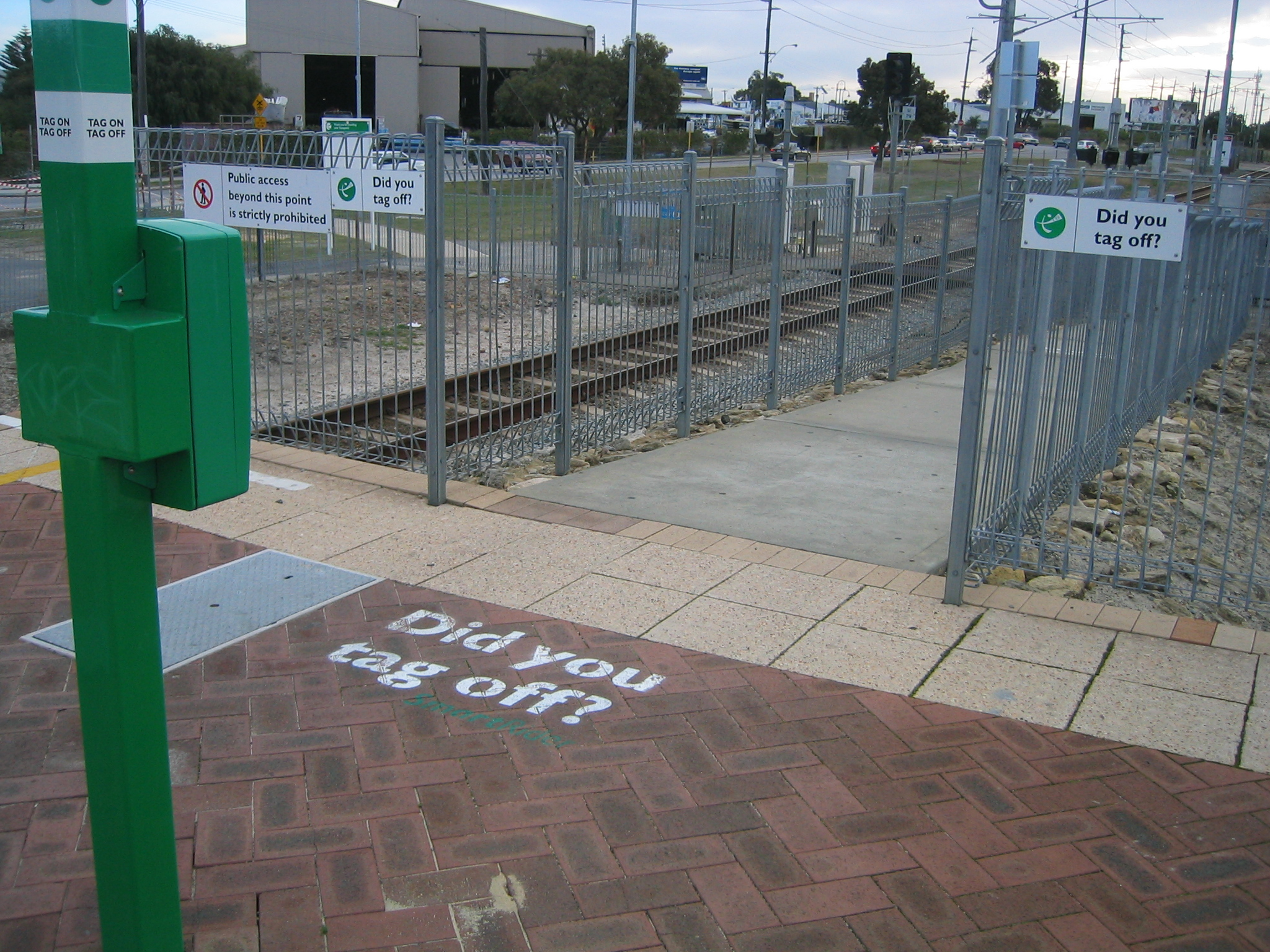
Several "Did you tag off?" notices displayed at the fence and the ground

=== Passenger usage ===
In order to successfully tag on, a card must contain a minimum equivalent to a two-section fare for the holder's user category (A$1.10 for concession, A$2.16 for adult) – the only exception is a Seniors SmartRider holder travelling during a nominated free travel period. If the card cannot be tagged on, a cash fare must be purchased.

=== Technical detail ===
The SmartRider project includes various machines and technologies to manage and control the system including distance travelled, fare deduction, and processing.

The SmartRider card's chip contains information such as the SmartRider number, current balance, concession/Autoload status and, if in the middle of a journey, the location the card was tagged on at. Upon 'tagging', this information is updated on the card by the processor. The processor will also store this information until the end of the day, where it is transmitted back to Transperth. Delayed transaction history is accessible by Transperth staff and the user if their card is linked to a Transperth account.

The network also functions by 'pending actions', where each SmartRider processor on the network downloads a list of recent actions Transperth has taken against a list of cards. The processors then wait until they next see that card, upon which data can be modified on them. For example, a hot-listed (or cancelled) card's number will be sent out to all processors (usually within 1–2 days of being reported), and when the card is next used the 'tag on' will be declined and the card updated to cancelled status (resulting in it being rejected in the future).

At the core of the system are the individual MIFARE cards issued to passengers using the system. When a card interacts with equipment, such as that found at the boarding and disembarking points for the various transport modes that the card operates across (bus, train, ferry), the data they exchange with that equipment includes a unique individual identification number that identifies that card.

The Infigo 4 Electronic Ticketing Machine (ETM) incorporates a smartcard processor that allows the driver to sign on and off, issue cash tickets and process SmartRider transactions. Passengers can use the unit to top up their SmartRider cards and the ETM/GPS interface also determines the exact location of a bus at all times and calculates fare zones automatically also allowing for live app tracking. The project also includes the Wayfarer SCP smartcard Platform processor for tagging on and off at all 'open' train station platforms, and the SCV, the Wayfarer smartcard bus and ferry validator for tagging on and off buses and ferries.

Data collected by processing equipment is then transmitted back to Transperth by either wired LAN (for fixed processors including standalone units and faregates) or wireless LAN (for buses and other mobile forms of transport).

Major train stations are fitted with Flowbird operated access control gates, which open in response to the card.

The Wayfarer Merit and SmarTrack back office systems provide statistical data and interface to the financial control systems of the Commonwealth Bank of Australia. Other functions will allow card top up via the Internet and by direct debit systems.

== Infrastructure ==
=== SmartRider Hub ===
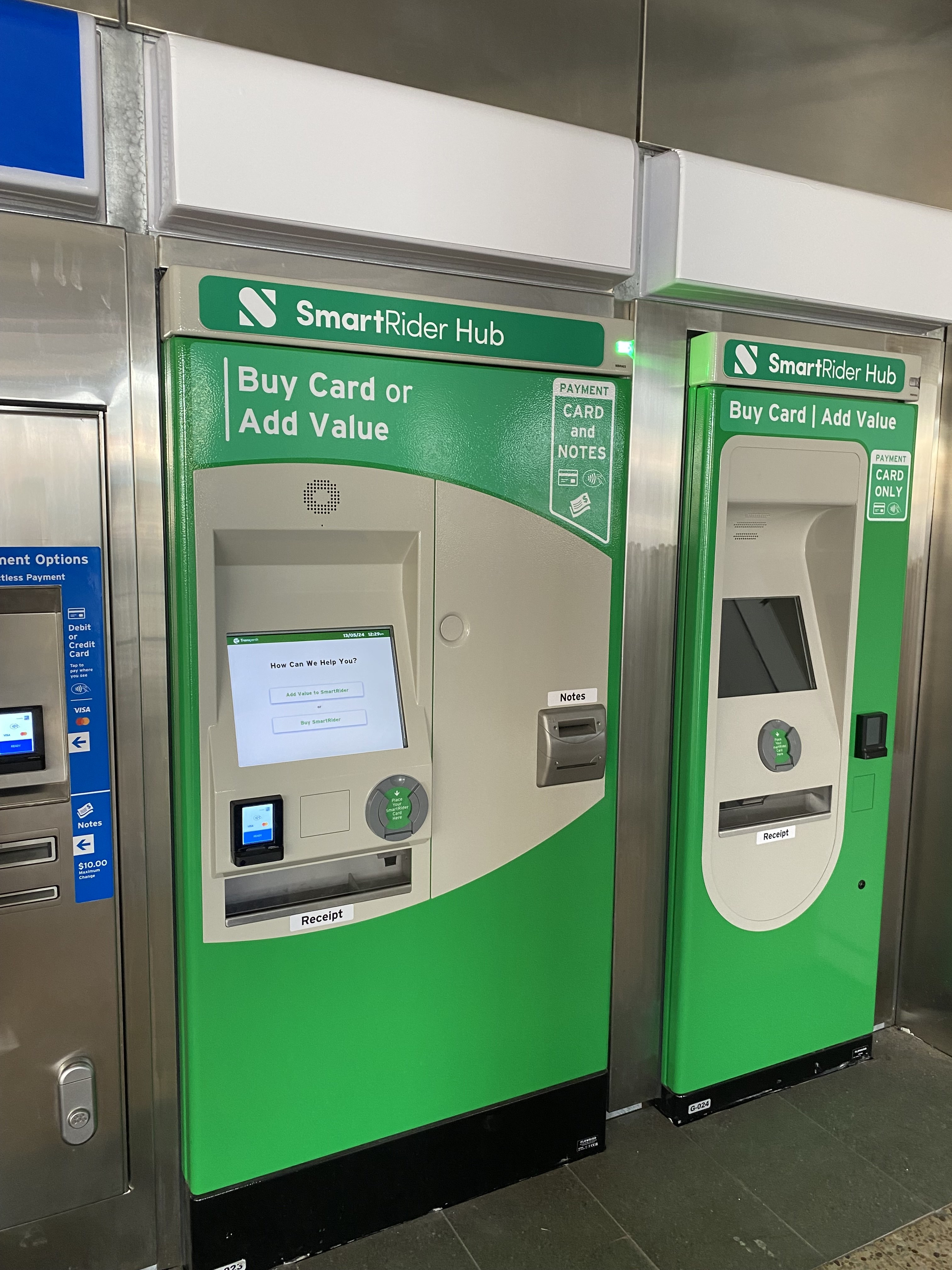
SmartRider Hub machines located at Bayswater Station

SmartRider Hubs allow customers to buy a standard SmartRider (A$10 per card and a minimum of A$10 added) and add value. The machines accept notes and Visa / Mastercard contactless payments only. They are located at the following stations:

- Airport line: Airport Central, Bayswater, High Wycombe, Perth, Redcliffe, Subiaco
- Armadale line: Cannington, Oats Street, Perth
- Ellenbrook line: Ballajura, Bayswater, Ellenbrook, Morley, Perth, Whiteman Park
- Fremantle line: Fremantle, Perth, Subiaco
- Mandurah line: Aubin Grove, Cockburn Central, Elizabeth Quay, Mandurah, Murdoch, Perth, Perth Underground, Rockingham
- Midland line: Bassendean, Bayswater, Perth
- Thornlie–Cockburn line: Cannington, Cockburn Central, Nicholson Road, Oats Street, Perth, Ranford Road, Thornlie
- Yanchep line: Alkimos, Clarkson, Eglinton, Elizabeth Quay, Joondalup, Perth, Perth Underground, Stirling, Warwick, Whitfords, Yanchep
- Elizabeth Quay Bus Station
- Perth Busport

=== Electronic transfer ===
Autoload allows a user to establish a direct debit authority or provide credit card information to automatically reload the card with a pre-set amount, once the low-value threshold of A$6 for standard users and A$3 for concession users is reached.

Loading a SmartRider automatically via Autoload is the only way users can achieve similar levels of fare savings in comparison to the previous MultiRider system.

Alternatively, passengers can manually transfer funds from their bank account using BPay, either via phone or internet. It takes 3–5 working days depending on your financial institution and the time of the BPay transaction. Passengers must have a minimum of a two section fare when they tag on for the funds to transfer onto the card.

=== Onboard ===
A SmartRider tag-on machine is integrated into the machines that issue bus and ferry tickets. Passengers can add value to the card with a minimum of A$10 for standard and A$5 for concession by paying the driver. Central Area Transit (CAT) buses are free and SmartRider is not needed.

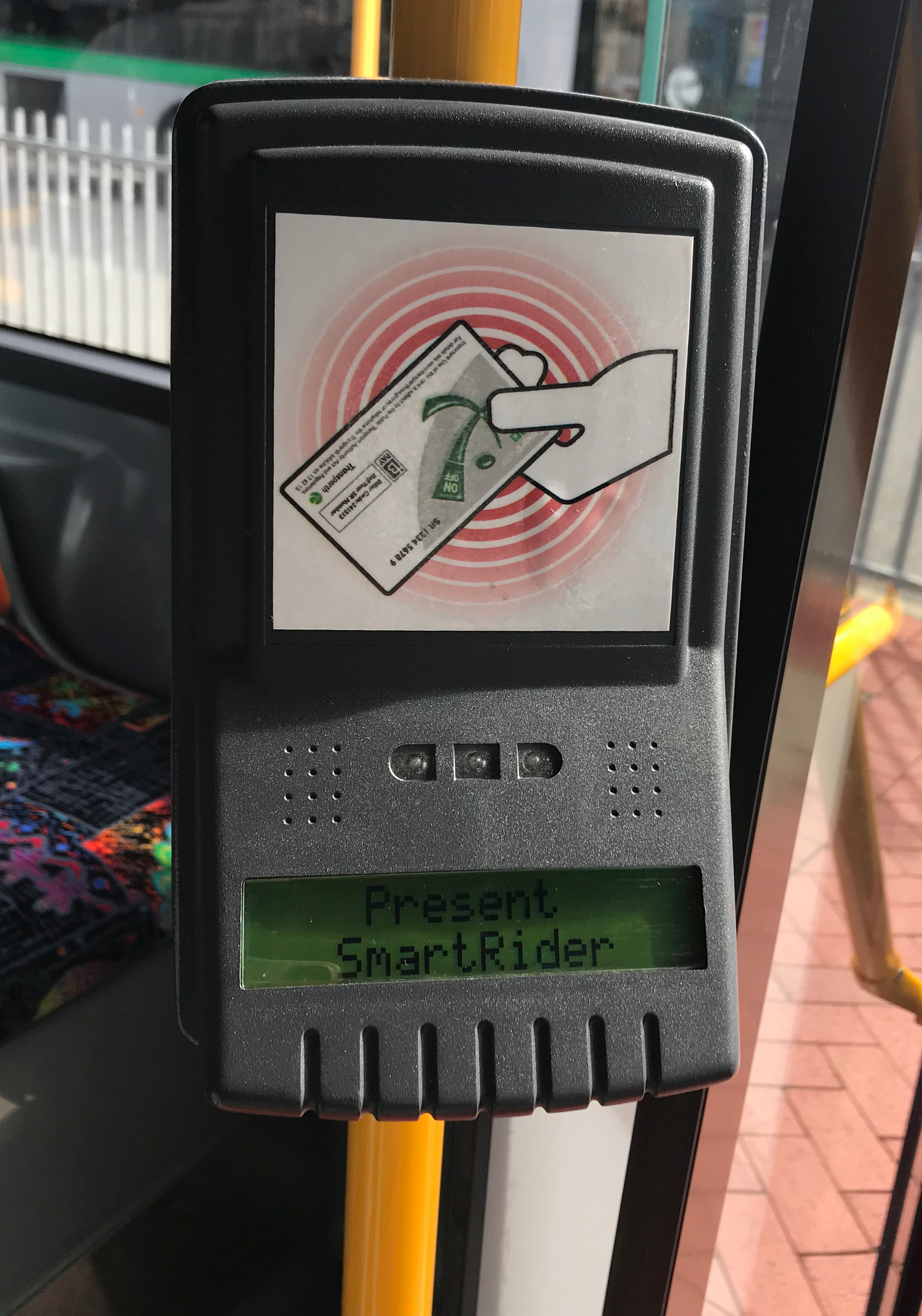
SmartRider reader, c. 2018

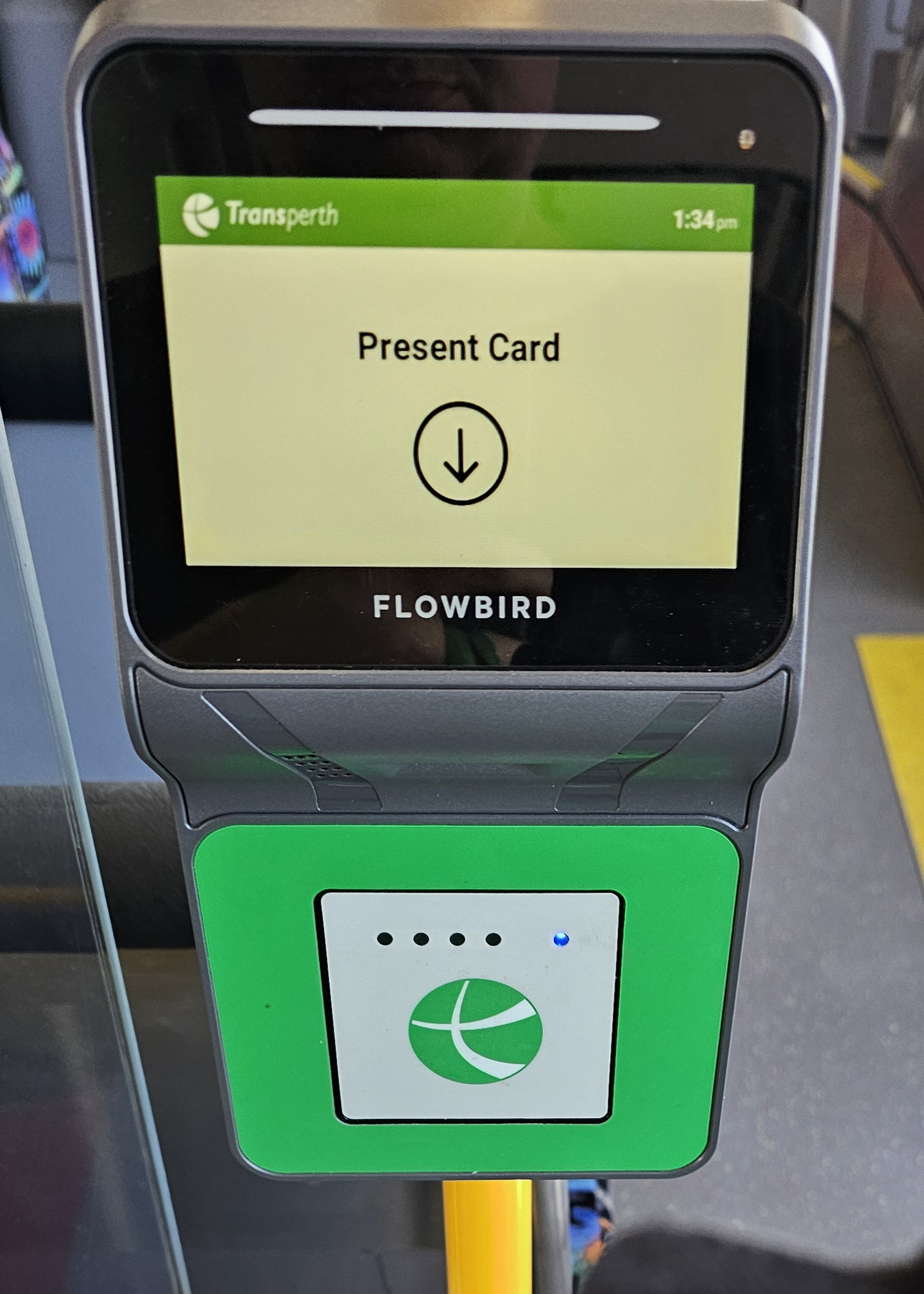
SmartRider reader, 2023

=== Retail ===
Value can be added via EFTPOS or cash at authorised retail outlets such as newsagents.

=== Station design ===
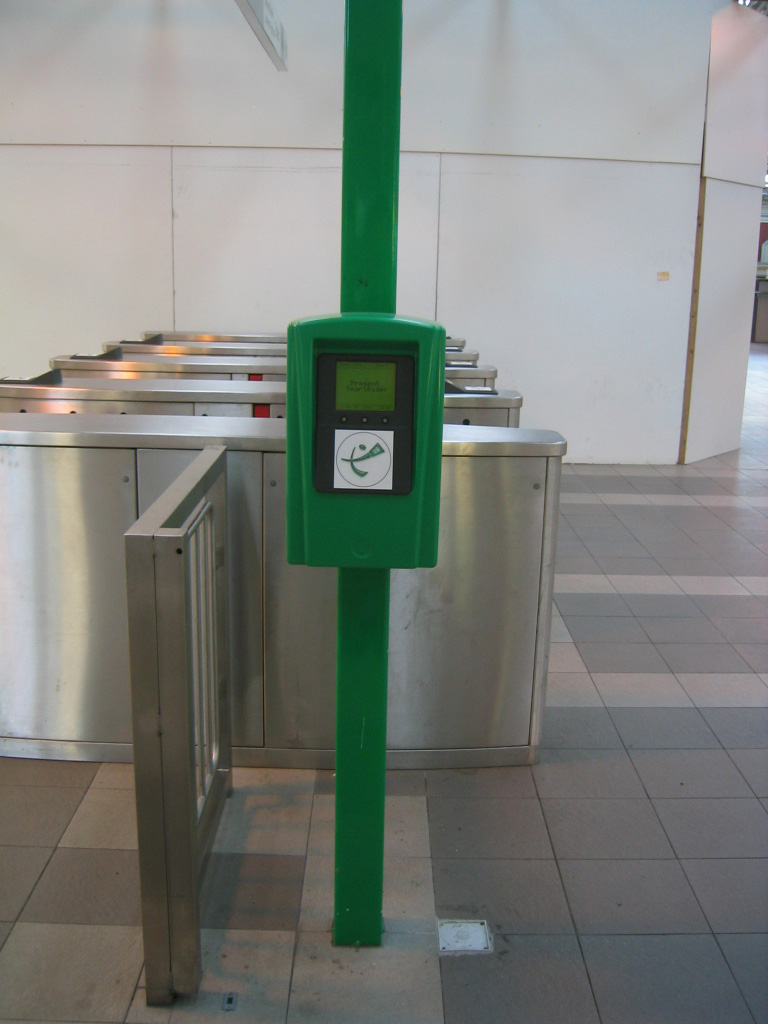
SmartRider processor at Perth Station

Until the SmartRider system was implemented, all Perth railway stations were open access, meaning that a passenger – or indeed, any member of the public – could freely walk into or out of any given train station, or onto a train, without being forced to buy a ticket.

SmartRider implementation has resulted in some stations being "closed" so that one must either validate a SmartRider at a gate to enter or exit the station, or alternatively show a valid ticket or concession card to a station attendant next to the gate. At all other "open" stations, fare gates have not been installed, and a SmartRider processor has been installed at station entry and exit points.

At some bus-train interchanges, arriving buses drop passengers off inside the paid area of a closed station. These stations have a special arrangement which allows passengers to transfer from a bus to a train and vice versa without going through a fare gate ("controlled"). Because of this, passengers tagging off a bus at any controlled station will automatically be tagged onto the train, and passengers tagging on this bus after getting off the train at a controlled station will automatically be tagged off the train before being tagged onto the bus.

==== Open stations ====
The following stations are open stations:

- Airport line: Claremont, Showgrounds, Loch Street, Karrakatta, Shenton Park, Daglish, Subiaco, West Leederville, City West, McIver, Claisebrook, East Perth, Mt Lawley, Maylands, and Meltham
- Armadale line: McIver, Claisebrook, Perth Station, Burswood, Victoria Park, Carlisle, Oats St, Queens Park, Cannington, Beckenham, Kenwick, Maddington, Gosnells, Seaforth, Kelmscott, and Challis & Sherwood
- Ellenbrook line: McIver, Claisebrook, East Perth, Mt Lawley, Maylands, and Meltham
- Fremantle line: North Fremantle, Victoria Street, Mosman Park, Cottesloe, Grant Street, Swanbourne, Claremont, Showgrounds, Loch Street, Karrakatta, Shenton Park, Daglish, Subiaco, West Leederville, and City West.
- Mandurah line: Canning Bridge, and Lakelands
- Midland line: McIver, Claisebrook, East Perth, Mt Lawley, Maylands, Meltham, Ashfield, Success Hill, Guildford, East Guildford, and Woodbridge
- Thornlie–Cockburn line: McIver, Claisebrook, Perth Station, Burswood, Victoria Park, Carlisle, Oats St, Queens Park, Cannington, Beckenham, Nicholson Road, and Ranford Road
- Yanchep line: Leederville, Glendalough, Greenwood, Edgewater, and Currambine

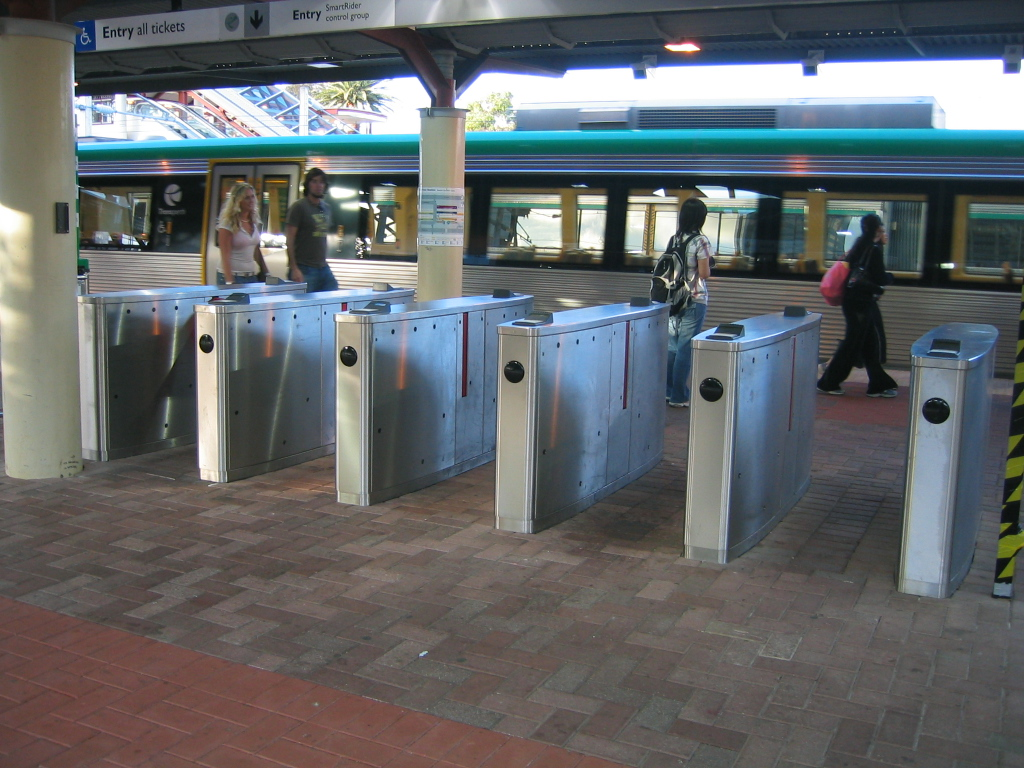
SmartRider fare gate at former Joondalup line platform, Perth Station

==== Closed stations ====
The following stations are closed stations:

- Airport line: Perth, Redcliffe, Airport Central, and High Wycombe
- Armadale line: Perth, Armadale, and Byford
- Fremantle line: Perth, Fremantle
- Mandurah line: Perth Underground, Elizabeth Quay, Bull Creek, Murdoch, Cockburn Central, Aubin Grove, Kwinana, Wellard, Rockingham, Warnbro, and Mandurah
- Midland line: Perth, Bassendean, and Midland
- Thornlie–Cockburn line: Perth, Thornlie, and Cockburn Central
- Yanchep line: Elizabeth Quay, Perth Underground, Stirling, Warwick, Whitfords, Joondalup, Clarkson, and Butler

==== Controlled stations ====
The following stations are controlled stations:

- Yanchep line: Warwick, and Whitfords

== Reception ==
As of 2020–21, 78.9% of all fare-paying boardings were made using a SmartRider.

== Criticism ==
=== Security ===
In February 2008, the Dutch government issued a warning about the security of access keys based on the ubiquitous MiFare Classic RFID chip (the same chip used in the SmartRider system) after some students from The University of Virginia demonstrated a theoretical attack which could retrieve the private key from the card within minutes on a standard desktop pc. It has been estimated that the security of the cards will hold up until early 2010 before it becomes a trivial matter to exploit the inherent security vulnerabilities of the RFID based card system.

=== Privacy ===
Users of the system pass their card over a processor both on boarding and departure of any mode of transport using the system. Each SmartRider card is uniquely numbered, and registration is necessary before the card can be used for concession card holders, and is necessary to access many of the advertised features for other users though is not compulsory. The registration process requires filling in a form providing Transperth with the passenger's full name, address, date of birth, SmartRider card number and password.

Usage data is stored both on the card and centrally by Transperth and provides users of the system the capability to check and review recent usage by either visiting a designated Information Kiosk or online via the Transperth website.

The police have the potential to use SmartRider card data as an investigative tool, and use of this feature overseas is dramatically increasing. In London, where the RFID-technology Oyster card is in use, there were 243 police requests made in total as of March 2006.

=== Design ===
The system has been criticised for usability issues in general system, website and top-up machine design.

=== Cost ===
Criticism has been directed at the cost to users of the SmartRider system compared to its predecessor, the MultiRider. While the MultiRider could be bought as a 40-ride ticket for a 25% discount, a lesser 20% discount can now only be obtained by paying by direct debit, which can take up to 3 weeks to activate. A 10% discount is available for all other methods of payment. This was raised in Parliament by Liberal MP Katie Hodson-Thomas, who claimed that passengers would end up paying A$324 more a year for public transport under SmartRider. In February 2006, The West Australian reported criticism by trial users who claimed that their failure to tag off, either by accidentally forgetting to do so or due to a non-working machine, resulted in a four-zone fare being charged to the SmartRider regardless of distance travelled.

However, Transperth has maintained that the default fare is "equal to the cash fare on the assumed basis that a passenger who has failed to tag off has travelled to the final destination of that particular bus, train or ferry service", and that the four-zone rate only applies to rail travel. During the implementation trial phase, the default fare was charged at the Cash Fare less the customer's discount based on how they last reloaded their card. With the opening of the Mandurah line, the default fare for travel on all train services was increased to a seven-zone fare, due to the ability of passengers to transfer trains without tagging off/on.

Further criticism has arisen from the set-up costs of the SmartRider card. For a standard SmartRider, the total cost of set up is A$20, and the cost of the card itself is A$10.

== See also ==
- Opal – Sydney's public transport ticketing system
- myki – Melbourne's public transport ticketing system
- go card – Brisbane's public transport ticketing system
- metroCARD – Adelaide's public transport ticketing system
- MyWay+ – Canberra's public transport ticketing system
