= Australian Transit Group =

Transport operator in Australia

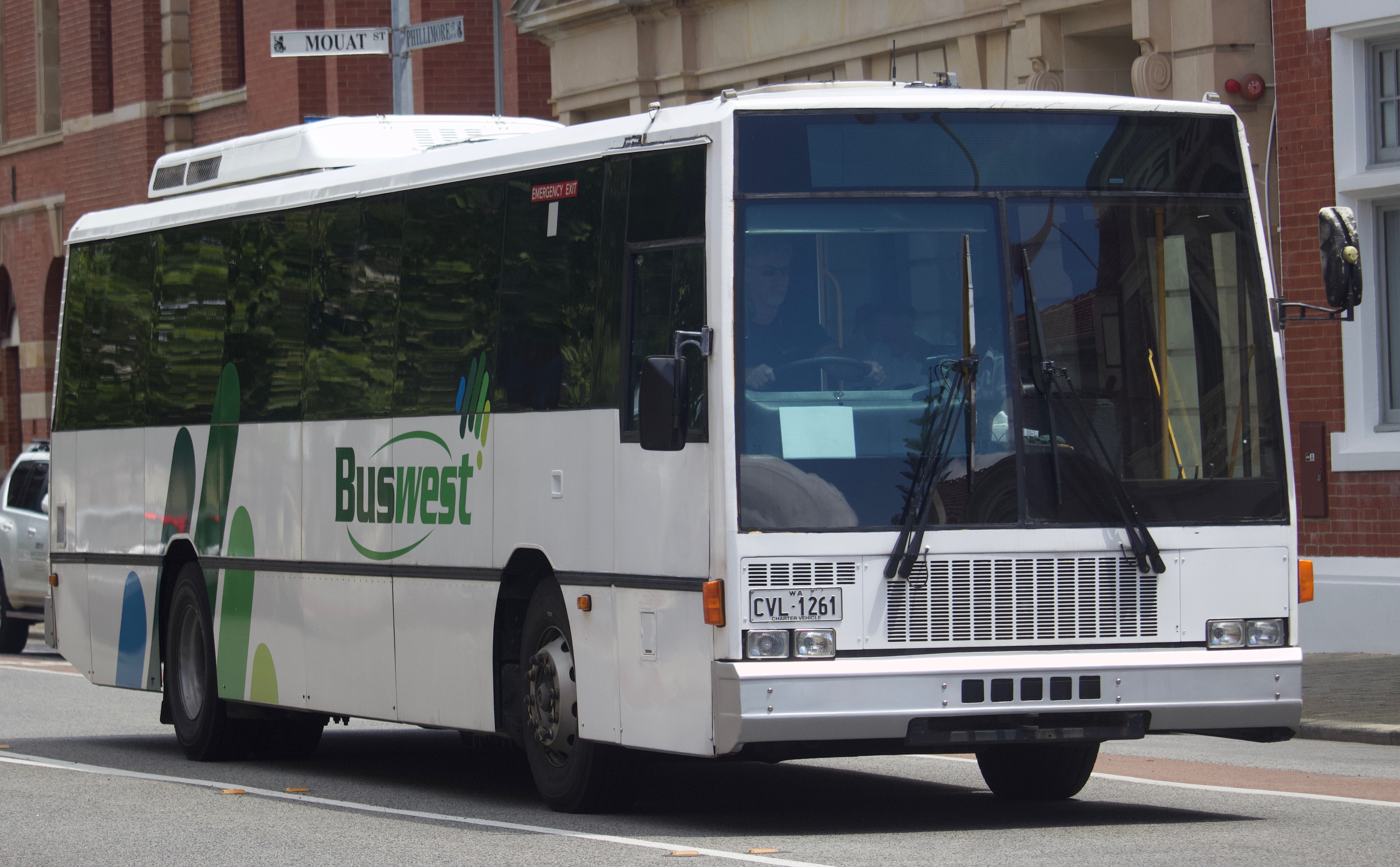
- Buswest Austral Denning bodied Volvo B10M in October 2018
- Parent: Ben Doolan
- Commenced operation: 2004
- Headquarters: Cockburn Central
- Service area: Northern Territory; Western Australia
- Service type: Bus operator
- Website: www.austransit.com.au

The Australian Transit Group (ATG) is a bus group with operations in the Northern Territory, Victoria and Western Australia. It was established in 2004 when Michael Baulch and Ben Doolan purchased Fortesque Bus Service, Karratha, Kojonup Bus Service and Mandurah Bus Charters from the Pryor Group. The partnership was terminated in 2007 with Baulch takinging the Kojunup area contracts and Doolan the remainder of the business. In November 2008, ATG purchased Buswest, the Pryor Group's remaining operation, in Perth.

ATG also has operations in Busselton, Carnarvon, Kalgoorlie, Karratha, Mandurah and Mount Barker. It operates the TransGeraldton and TransHedland networks in Geraldton and Port Hedland under contract to the Public Transport Authority.

In 2012 it purchased the Alice Springs school bus operations of Dysons and rebranded Charter Central. In 2015, Busselton based South West Coach Lines and Melbourne charter operator Quince's Scenicruisers were purchased.

ATG purchased the Perth based Roberts Luxury Tours and Alice Springs based Downunder Tours with both rebranded as ATG Downunder.
