= Swan Transit =

Australian bus company

- Parent: Transit Systems
- Founded: 21 January 1996
- Locale: Perth
- Service area: Transperth
- Service type: Bus
- Depots: 22
- Fleet: 1435 (November 2024)
- Chief executive: Michael Mcgee
- Website: www.transitsystems.com.au/wa-perth-swan-transit-bus-services

Old logo of Swan Transit

Swan Transit is an Australian bus company operating Transperth bus services under contract to the Public Transport Authority. It is a subsidiary of Transit Systems.

== History ==
On 21 January 1996, Swan Transit commenced operating services in the Midland area with 43 buses.

On 29 September 1996, Swan Transit commenced operating services in the Canning Vale and Southern River areas from depots in Canning Vale and Southern River with 119 Mercedes-Benz and Renault buses.

In January 1998, Swan Transit gained further services in the Armadale South and Kalamunda areas on 5 July 1998.

In September 2002, Swan Transit purchased the Perth operations of Connex WA, resulting services gain in Claremont and Belmont areas. It initially traded as Swan Transit Riverside. Connex (now Transdev) would re-enter the market in September 2004 when it purchased Southern Coast Transit from National Express.

In May 2011, Swan Transit commenced an eight-year contract to operate services in the Marmion contract area. The Marmion contract area includes Karrinyup depot which was operated by Path Transit. However, Swan Transit did not retain the Kalamunda contract, which was taken over by Path Transit in October 2012.

As of April 2019, Swan Transit operates the Canning, Claremont, Marmion, Midland and Southern River area contracts.

In October 2019, Swan Transit was successful in retaining its Marmion and Claremont contracts, as well as gaining the Joondalup contract, taking over the Joondalup operations from Transdev WA on 19 January 2020. The three contracts will run for 10 years and expire in January 2030.

In 2021, the TransGoldfields contract was awarded to Swan Transit.

=== Swan Transit South West ===
==== TransBunbury and TransBusselton ====
In January 2015, Swan Transit commenced operating 10 year contracts to operate services in Bunbury and Busselton under the TransBunbury and TransBusselton brands, taking over from South West Coach Lines.

In November 2024, Swan Transit’s contracts for TransBunbury and TransBusselton were renewed for another 10 years.

==== TransAlbany ====
In July 2017, Swan Transit commenced operating 10 year contracts to operate services in Albany under the TransAlbany brand, taking over from Love's Bus Service.

== Depots ==
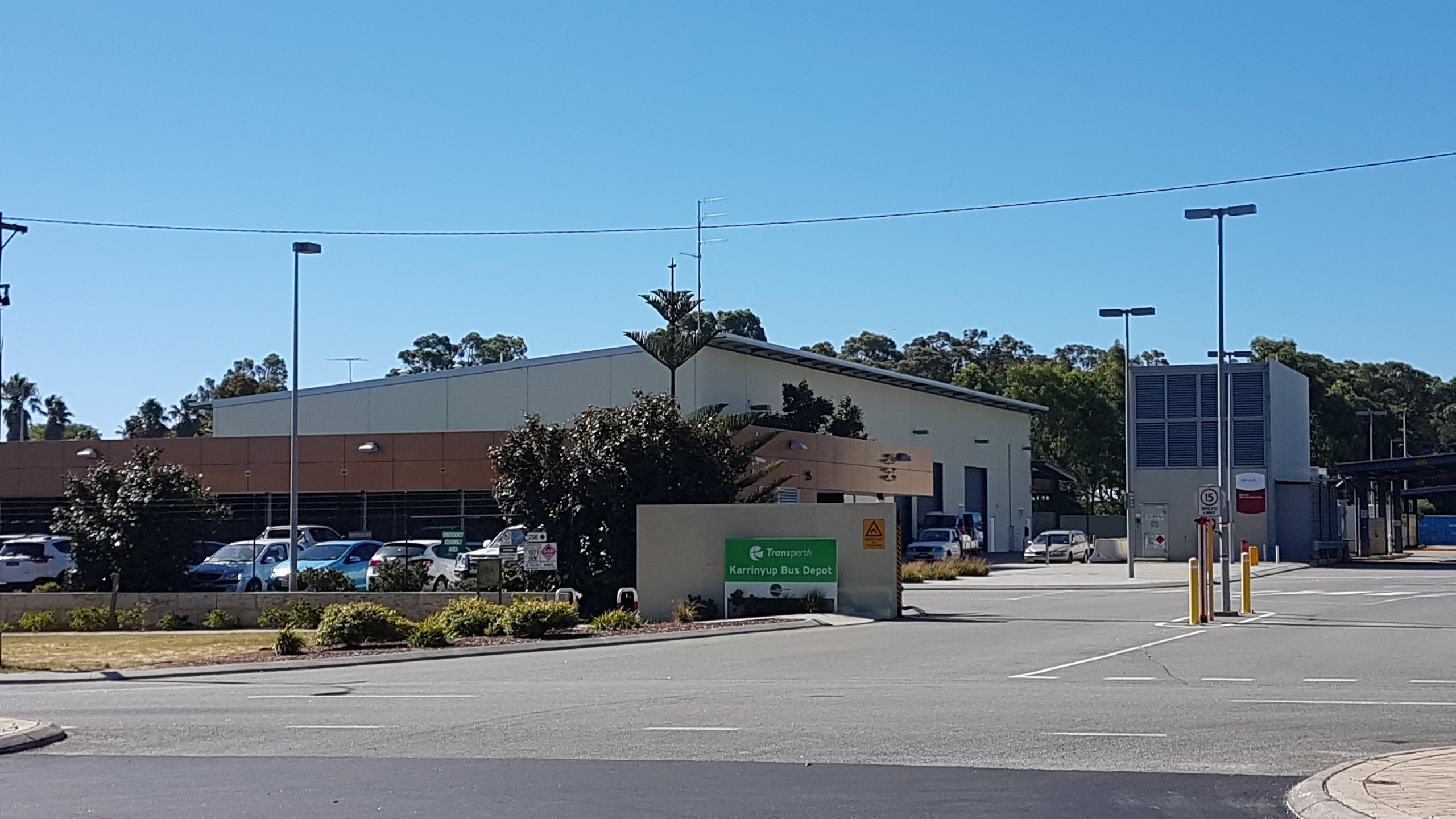
Karrinyup bus depot

As of November 2024, Swan Transit operates 15 depots for its Transperth operations:

- Beckenham
- Canning Vale
- Ellenbrook
- Mount Claremont
- Karrinyup
- Midvale
- Shenton Park
- Champion Lakes (Southern River)
- Craigie (Beenyup)
- Mundaring
- Joondalup
- Wangara
- Ridgewood (Nowergup)
- Jandakot
- Alkimos

Outside Perth, Swan Transit operates four depots, Albany, Bunbury, Busselton and Kalgoorlie, for its TransAlbany, TransBunbury, TransBusselton and TransGoldfields operations respectively.
