= TransBusselton =

Public bus system in Western Australia

- TP2109 at Albert Street in Busselton
- Parent: Public Transport Authority (PTA)
- Headquarters: Busselton
- Service area: Busselton, Dunsborough Western Australia
- Service type: Bus services
- Routes: 3 Town, 24 School Special routes
- Fleet: 34 ( November 2026 )
- Operator: Swan Transit
- Website: www.transregional.wa.gov.au/Regions/TransBusselton

TransBusselton is the public bus system that operates in the towns of Busselton and Dunsborough, Western Australia.

== History ==
In 2009, the existing Busselton bus network was rebranded to TransBusselton. SmartRider ticketing was introduced and the existing fleet was replaced with a PTA owned fleet.

The three town routes, 901 (Busselton – Broadwater), 902 (Busselton – Geographe circle) and 903 (Busselton – Dunsborough), ran to South West Coach Lines main office in Busselton. With exception of 903 which commenced operation in 2011

Between 2010 and 2011, construction of the new Busselton bus depot was completed.

In 2014, Swan Transit was awarded the tender to operate the TransBusselton for 10 years, starting in 2015. Additionally, the Busselton and Dunsborough contract areas were merged into one. Prior to this, South West Coach Lines and another operator ran the TransBusselton bus services.

Between 2015 and 2016, routes 901, 902 and 903 were re-numbered to 816, 817 and 815 respectively. In late 2017, the 815 had a trial to increase early and late bus services but was withdrawn due to low passenger numbers. The early and late routes were re-introduced at a later date In 2018, a trial Busselton – Kealy (now rezoned to Vasse) was introduced with number 818. It followed route 815 until caves road, where it followed Bussell Highway to Vasse. Due to low passenger numbers, the route was withdrawn. In 2022, the 816 was extended to Vasse.

In 2024, the tender with Swan Transit was renewed for another 10 years.

== Routes ==
TransBusselton currently operates three town routes; 815 Busselton – Dunsborough; 816 Busselton – Vasse; 817 Busselton – Geographe circle route.

TransBusselton also operates 24 school service specials.

== Fleet ==
TransBusselton's fleet as of November 2026 consists of a mix of ex-Transperth and ex-Bunbury City Transit buses, with Mercedes-Benz O405NHs, Mercedes Benz O500Us and Mercedes Benz OC500LEs in use. There are currently 14, 2 and 18 of each bus type respectively, totalling 34 buses.
