= MetroCard (disambiguation) =

MetroCard is a discontinued fare card used on subways, buses, and other public transport in the New York metropolitan area. Other fare cards known as the METROcard, MetroCard or Metrocard:

- metroCARD, launched in 2012–2013 on Adelaide Metro buses, trams, and trains in Adelaide, Australia
- METROcard, which was used on the Metro Monorail and light rail in Sydney, Australia
- MetroCard, used in several Tokyo subway systems in Japan, replaced in 1988–2007 by the Pasmo RFID card
- Metrocard, used on buses on public transport routes in Christchurch and Timaru, New Zealand, under the "Metro" branding
- MetroCard, used on the West Yorkshire Metro in West Yorkshire, England
- MetroCard, used on the Merseytravel network in the Liverpool City Region
