= Love's Bus Service =

Australian school bus service

- Parent: Kinetic Group
- Founded: 1975
- Defunct: 2022
- Headquarters: Cairns, Queensland
- Service area: Cairns
- Service type: Charter bus services
- Fleet: 92 (July 2012)

Love's Bus Service was an Australian school bus service, operating in Cairns. In 2022 It was re-branded and dissolved into Sunbus Cairns, one of Kinetic Group's (parent company) Bus companies.

== History ==
Love's Bus Service was established in 1975 when the business of Cooper, Benger was acquired. Love's operated the Bunbury urban services until it was put out to tender, and passed to South West Coach Lines.

By 2002, Love's had an operation in Kerang, Victoria. In 2002, Love's commenced operating in Queensland, purchasing the Cairns based school services of Stagecoach.

In July 2013, Love's commenced operating the TransAlbany network under contract to the Public Transport Authority. Upon being re-tendered, the TransAlbany services were taken over by Swan Transit in July 2017 with 17 buses. The Cairns business was sold to the Kinetic Group in January 2020 and was dissolved into the Sunbus brand in early 2022.
