= Ben Doolan =

Australian rules footballer

Personal information
- Full name: Ben Doolan
- Born: 10 January 1973 (age 53)
- Original team: Albury (OMFL)
- Height: 181 cm (5 ft 11 in)
- Weight: 95 kg (209 lb)

Playing career^{1}
Years	Club	Games (Goals)
1991–1992	Sydney	25 (4)
1994–1999	Essendon	76 (7)
Total		101 (11)
- ^{1} Playing statistics correct to the end of 1999.

Ben Doolan (born 10 January 1973) is a former Australian rules footballer who played for Sydney and Essendon in the Australian Football League during the 1990s.

Doolan has been the proprietor of bus operator Australian Transit Group since 2004.
