= TransAlbany =

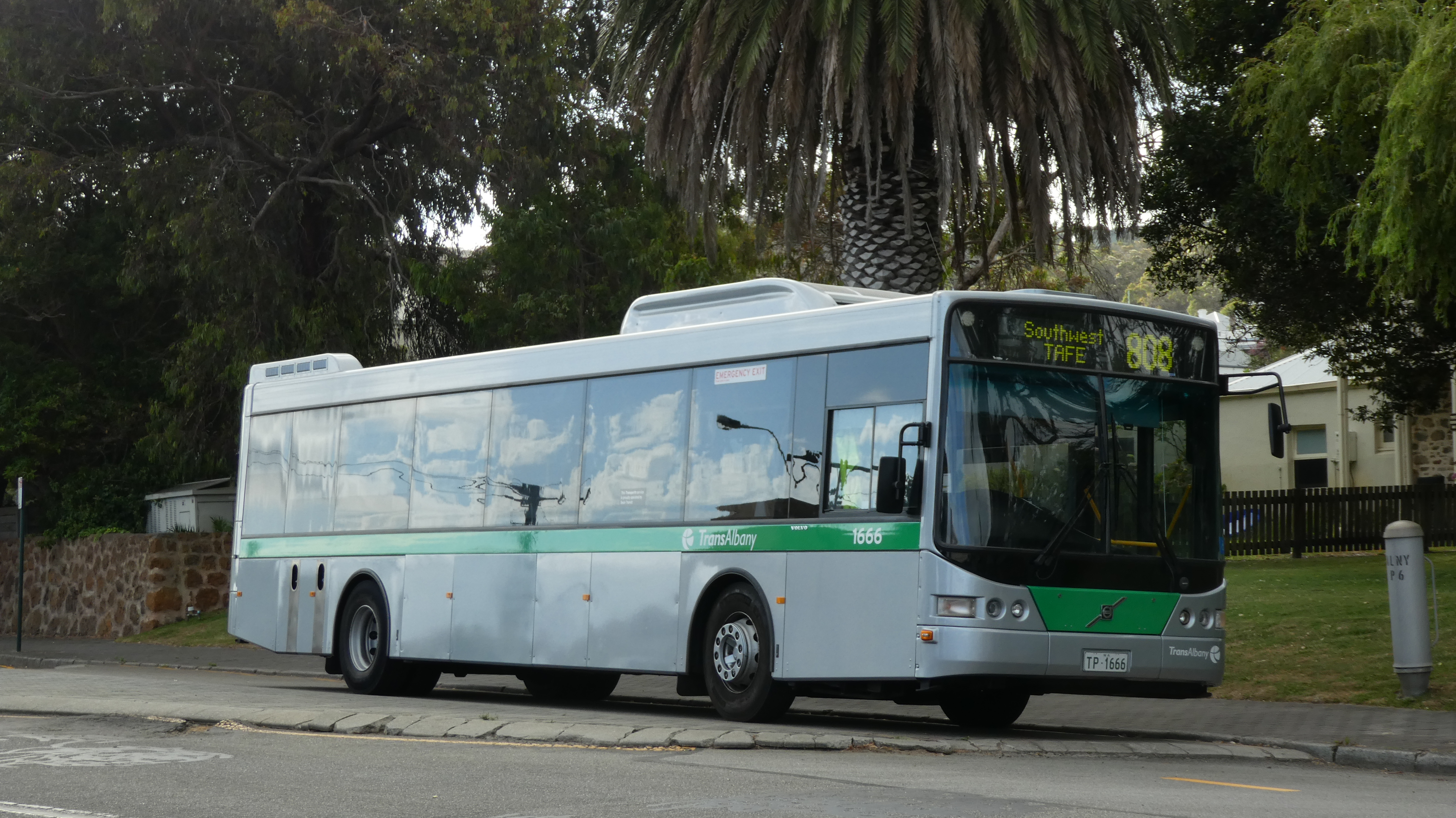
- Volgren bodied Volvo B7RLE in Albany in February 2023
- Parent: Public Transport Authority
- Founded: July 2013
- Headquarters: Centennial Park
- Service area: Albany
- Service type: Bus services
- Routes: 6
- Operator: Swan Transit

TransAlbany is the public bus transport system in Albany, Western Australia.

== History ==
In July 2013, bus services in Albany began operating under the TransAlbany banner with SmartRider ticketing introduced. It was initially operated by Love's Bus Service with five of its buses taken into Public Transport Authority ownership. Upon being re-tendered, the TransAlbany services were taken over by Swan Transit in July 2017 with 17 buses operating out of a new depot in Centennial Park.

== Services ==
TranAlbany operate six routes numbered 803 to 808.
