= Western Australian Seniors Card =

Identification card

The Western Australian Seniors Card is an identity, concession and discount card issued by the Department of Communities of the Government of Western Australia. Currently there are more than 380,000 WA Seniors Card members.

== History ==
Western Australia was the first jurisdiction in Australia to introduce the Seniors Card. The Hon. Kay Hallahan MLA, Minister for the Aged, stated that the Seniors Card was introduced due to requests from seniors who needed a form of identification so they could take advantage of a number of concessions offered by the private sector.

Premier Peter Dowding officially launched the Seniors Card program on 19 April 1988 at the Maylands Autumn Centre as part of the Government's Family Package.

The WA Seniors Card provides a form of identification that enables eligible seniors to take advantage of a wide range of discounts and concessions. The first State Government concession available on the WA Seniors Card was Transperth and Westrail Transport Concessions in 1988.

For 17 years after its introduction the eligible age to apply for a WA Seniors Card was 60, but this was increased in the 2015-16 State Budget by then Premier Colin Barnett. Effective on 1 July 2015 the Barnett Government raised the WA Seniors Card age limit from 60 to 61, with plans to increase the age cap progressively every second year until the age limit reached 65 in 2023.

The government led by Premier Mark McGowan did not stop or reverse this progressive increase in the age of eligibility .

This is despite McGowan, while in Opposition, opposing reduced eligibility for the Seniors Card and stating that these concessions were more important In Western Australia than in other states as it had the highest cost of living.

== Eligibility ==
The WA Seniors Card website shows the eligibility requirements for a Seniors Card. The age of eligibility was to increase until it reaches 65 in 2023. Applicants must be permanent residents of Western Australia and work less than 25 hours per week, averaged out over a year.

== Concessions ==
A range of State Government concessions, rebates and benefits are available with the WA Seniors Card. The State Government provides concessions on local government rates, water service charges, spectacles, driver's licence renewal fees and fishing licences. The card is combined with a Seniors SmartRider, which offers free off-peak public transport and concession fares at all other times.
