= South West Coach Lines =

Bus operator in Western Australia

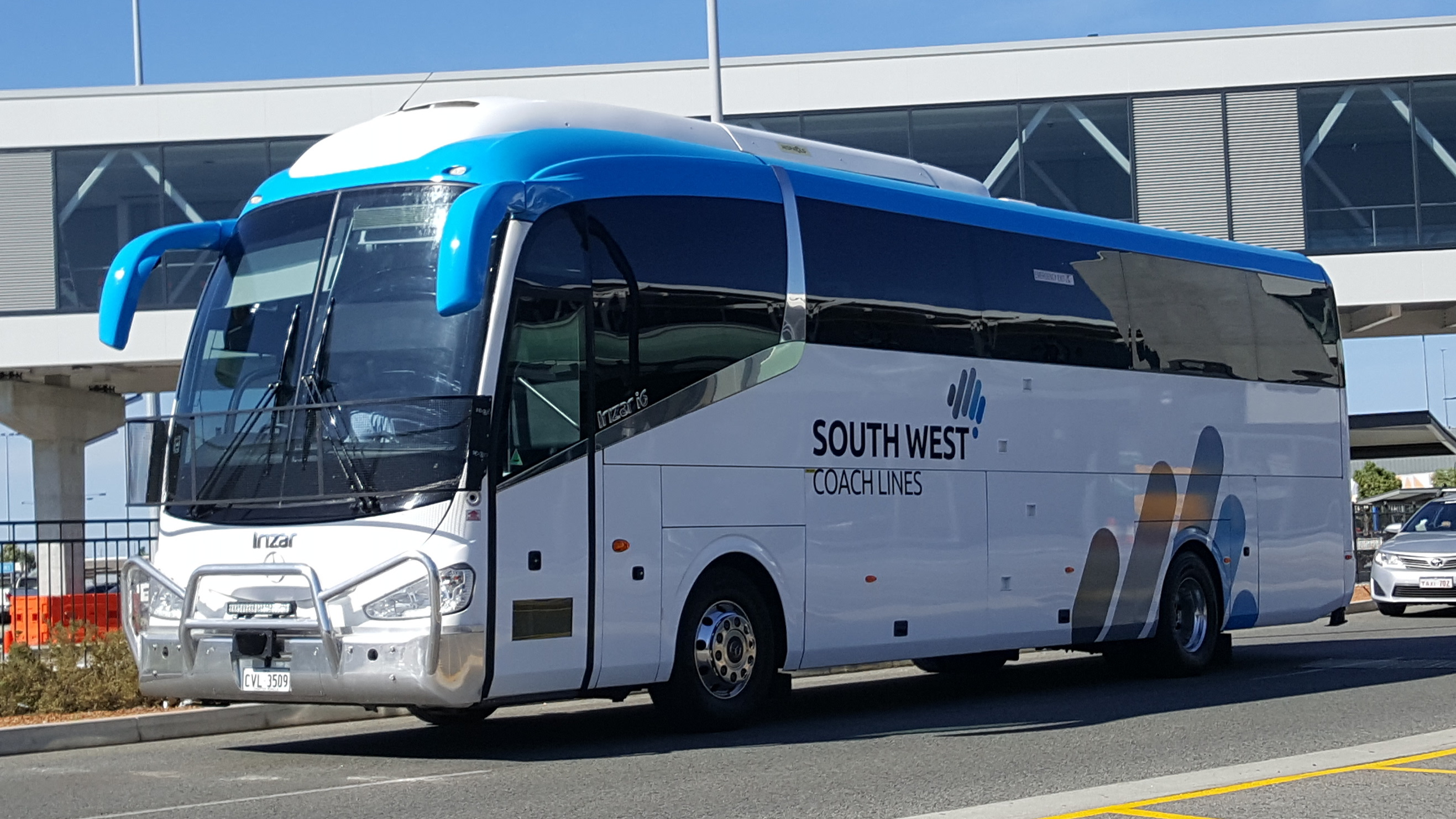
- Irizar bodied Mercedes-Benz O500R at Perth Airport in December 2019
- Parent: Australian Transit Group
- Founded: 1977
- Headquarters: Busselton, Western Australia
- Service area: South West Western Australia
- Service type: Bus & coach services
- Fleet: 64 (May 2014)
- Website: www.southwestcoachlines.com.au

South West Coach Lines is a bus and coach operator in South West Western Australia. It is a subsidiary of the Australian Transit Group.

== History ==
South West Coach Lines was founded in 1977 by David and Lenita Adams. In January 1986 it commenced operating the Bunbury City Transit service replacing Love's Bus Service. The fleet consisted of eight Howard Porter bodied Mercedes-Benz OH1316 buses painted in a livery of white with sky and royal blue bands.

In 1988 it commenced operating a three times weekly service from Mandurah to Pinjarra under contract to the Government of Western Australia.

In November 2007 the business was purchased by Veolia Transport and in July 2013 became part of Transdev.

In December 2009, South West Coach Lines commenced operating three services in Busselton under the TransBusselton brand under contract with the Public Transport Authority. Upon being re-tendered, the routes passed to Swan Transit from 1 January 2015.

In 2011 the Bunbury services were rebranded as TransBunbury with the Public Transport Authority acquiring the fleet and depot from Veolia and introducing its silver and green livery. In 2015 South West Coach lines was sold to the Australian Transit Group.

== Fleet ==
As at September 2013, the TransBusselton fleet consists of 22 buses. As at May 2014, the South West Coach Lines fleet consists of 42 buses and coaches.
