= MultiRider =

Public transport ticketing in Australia

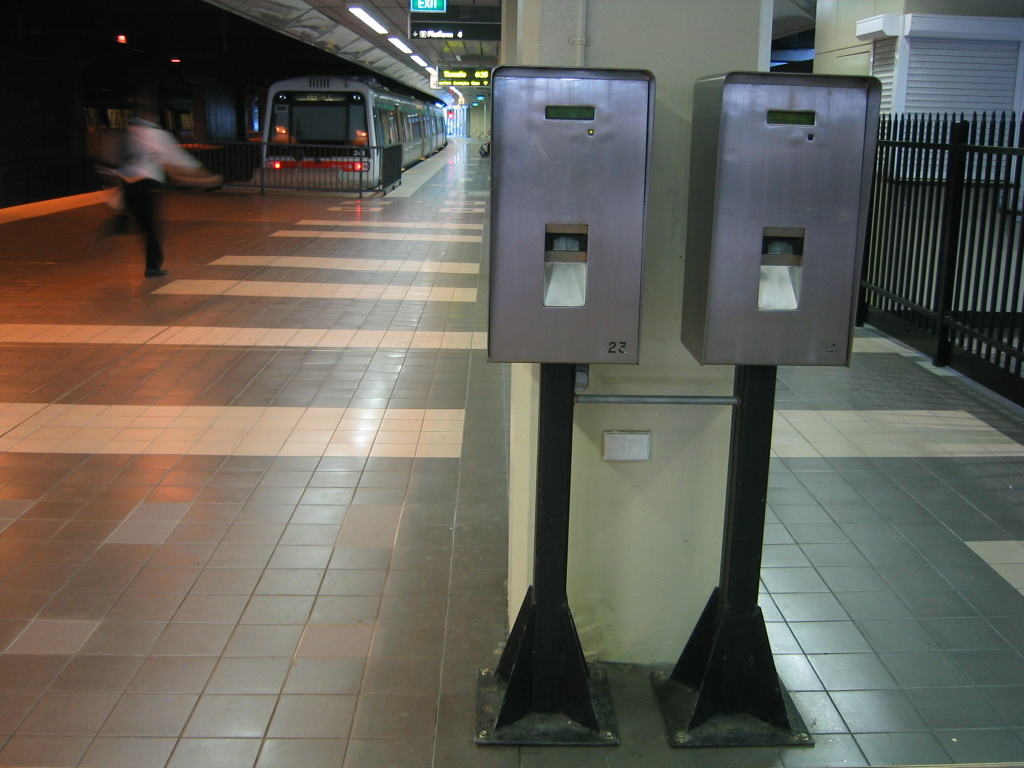
Two MultiRider Validators on Platform 4 at Perth railway station

MultiRider was a pre-purchased magnetic-stripe ticketing system used on rail, bus, and ferry services operated under the Transperth brand, either by or under contract for the Public Transport Authority of Western Australia.

== History ==
The MultiRider was introduced in the early 1990s.

The MultiRider ticketing system was withdrawn in stages between February and April of 2007.

First stage, from 14 February 2007:

- The SmartRider ticketing system completed full rollout and SmartRider cards became available from Transperth InfoCentres and authorised SmartRider Retail Outlets across the Perth metropolitan area.
- The SmartRider system operated in parallel with the existing MultiRider to allow passengers to use up any remaining value on MultiRider tickets.

Second stage, from 5 March 2007:

- MultiRiders were withdrawn from sale.

Third stage, from 8 April 2007:

- The MultiRider ticketing system was withdrawn from use on the Transperth network.
- Passengers who had any remaining value on their MultiRiders were able to transfer the value to their SmartRider by completing a MultiRider refund form, which is available from Transperth InfoCentres, at authorised SmartRider Retail Outlets or online.

On 8 April 2007, the MultiRider ticketing system was replaced entirely by SmartRider. When MultiRiders were phased out by Transperth, Transwa introduced its own MultiRiders for use on its Australind and AvonLink services. Transwa now use SmartCommuter cards instead.

== Fares ==
The following MultiRider fares were available:

Fare type	Single trip	10 trips	40 trips
Standard	DayRider - valid for all zones, all day after 9am	From 2 section to 8 zone fare	From 2 section to 8 zone fare
Concession	DayRider - valid for all zones, all day after 9am	From 2 section to 8 zone fare	From 2 section to 8 zone fare
Senior	Senior ticket - valid for Sundays, public holidays and senior's week (replaced by Senior SmartRider)		
Student	Student ticket - valid for primary and secondary school students only (replaced by Student SmartRider)		

If it was the passenger's first trip using the card, or a previous validation was over two hours ago (for 1-4 zones, 3 hours for 5-8 zones), a trip was deducted from the card, and the information about the current trip was printed onto the front of the card. If the passenger was transferring between services, and their current trip was still valid, a "T" was printed onto the card (on 10-trip MultiRiders only).

MultiRiders could be purchased for use over any distance from two sections to eight zones. MultiRiders came with 10, 20, or 40 trips encoded onto them, and were up to 25% cheaper than the equivalent cash fares at the time. The 40 trips of MultiRider tickets used to be known as MultiRider Plus.

== Infrastructure ==
The validation system was based on a series of equipment supplied by the UK-based company Wayfarer Transit Systems. The card system was based on magnetic stripe cards containing simple information such as the number of trips that they can be used with, the number of transit zones that can be traversed, and the time and location of the last validation. Before boarding a service or transferring between train and bus services, passengers had to validate the card by inserting it into a validator located on train platforms and on buses.

== Criticism ==
The Student MultiRider was introduced on 10 October 2005. This type of MultiRider provided a 50 cent fare on a journey, valid for three hours in all zones. The Student MultiRider also was available in two types of tickets, in 10 trips, or in 40 trips. The Student MultiRider was available for primary and secondary school students only.

While the Student MultiRider was introduced, the Curtin Student Guild pointed out that state government did not provide the 50 cents student fare on tertiary school students (university and TAFE student), and the state government should provide the same concession price as primary and secondary school students. However, the state government replied that the tertiary school students can have the standard concession fare for their journey.

== See also ==
- MyZone – Sydney's former public transport ticketing system
- Metcard – Melbourne's former public transport ticketing system
