= TransGoldfields =

Bus system in Kalgoorlie, Western Australia

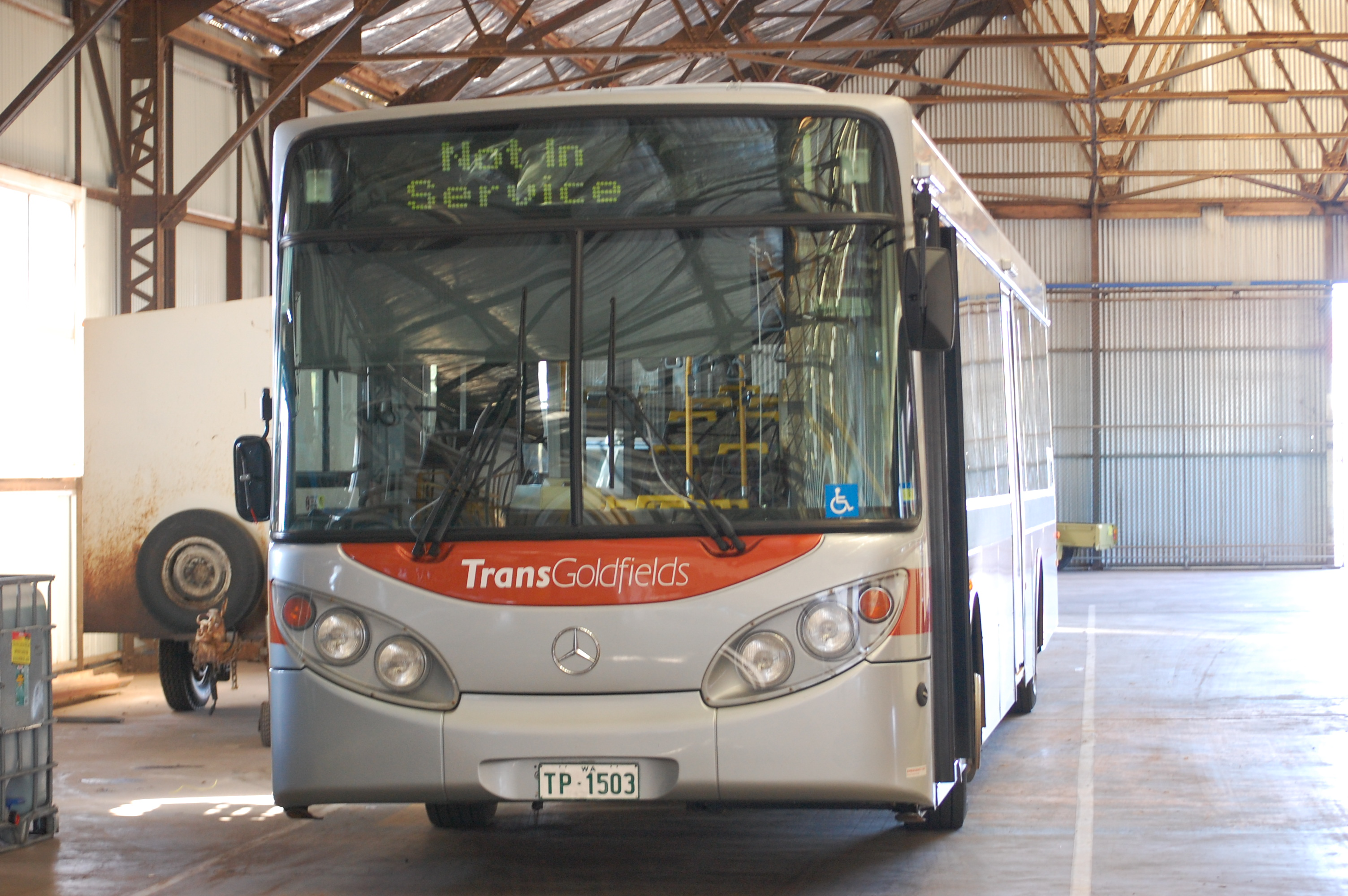
- Volgren bodied Mercedes-Benz O405NH in September 2009
- Parent: Public Transport Authority
- Service area: Kalgoorlie
- Service type: Bus services
- Routes: 3
- Hubs: Exchange Hotel
- Fleet: 16 (January 2014)
- Operator: Swan Transit

TransGoldfields is the public bus transport system in Kalgoorlie, Western Australia.

== History ==
The origins of TransGoldfields can be traced back to 1 April 1947 when the privately owned Kalgoorlie tram network was taken over by the Eastern Goldfields Transport Board (EGTB). In December 2006 the EGTB was taken over by the Public Transport Authority with the TransGoldfields brand introduced.

In 2011 the contract was awarded to Path Transit. When next tendered in 2021, it was awarded to Swan Transit.

== Services ==
TransGoldfields operates three circular bus routes, each route named as CircleRoute.

== Ticketing ==
Paper tickets can be bought on the buses. The SmartRider card is valid for use on TransGoldfields services.
