= Australian Seniors Card =

Concession card issued by Australian governments

Seniors Card
- The front of a South Australian Seniors Card shown with Adelaide Metro access
- Type: concession card
- Issued by: States and Territories of Australia
- Purpose: Identification for benefits
- Eligibility: Permanent residents of Australia aged 60 or over, reduced working hours
- Expiration: none
- Cost: Generally no charge

The Australian Seniors Card is a card issued by various Australian State and Territory governments to permanent residents, over a particular age, who work no more than a set number of paid hours per week, or based on state or territory requirements.

In New South Wales(NSW) for example, green Medicare card holders can apply online. Applications can also be made in a Service NSW office in that state. Similar facilities are available in other states.

Some states such as Queensland have multiple types, depending on whether the holder is working or not, and whether the holder uses metropolitan transport. South Australia provides an all-in-one card, allowing access on public transport in Adelaide through an RFID capability in the card.

The purpose of the card is to identify seniors and to take advantage of discounts offered to senior citizens in the state or territory, with a number of commercial offers being made available to holders. While reciprocal acceptance of the card could be made across states in some cases, there is no guarantee or standard policy to do so.

It differs from a concession card in that it is available to senior citizens of the state or territory regardless of whether or not they receive an age pension.

The Seniors Card has a logo of the Seniors Card scheme, the name of the holder, an identifying number, generally some logo of the state or territory issuing the card, and often the words "The holder is a valued member of our community. Please extend every courtesy and assistance."

While it may be used as a secondary identification card, the absence of a photo and security features make it less useful for identification purposes than a photo card or a driver's licence.
