= MyWay (ticketing system) =

Smart card for public transport in Canberra

MyWay / MyWay+
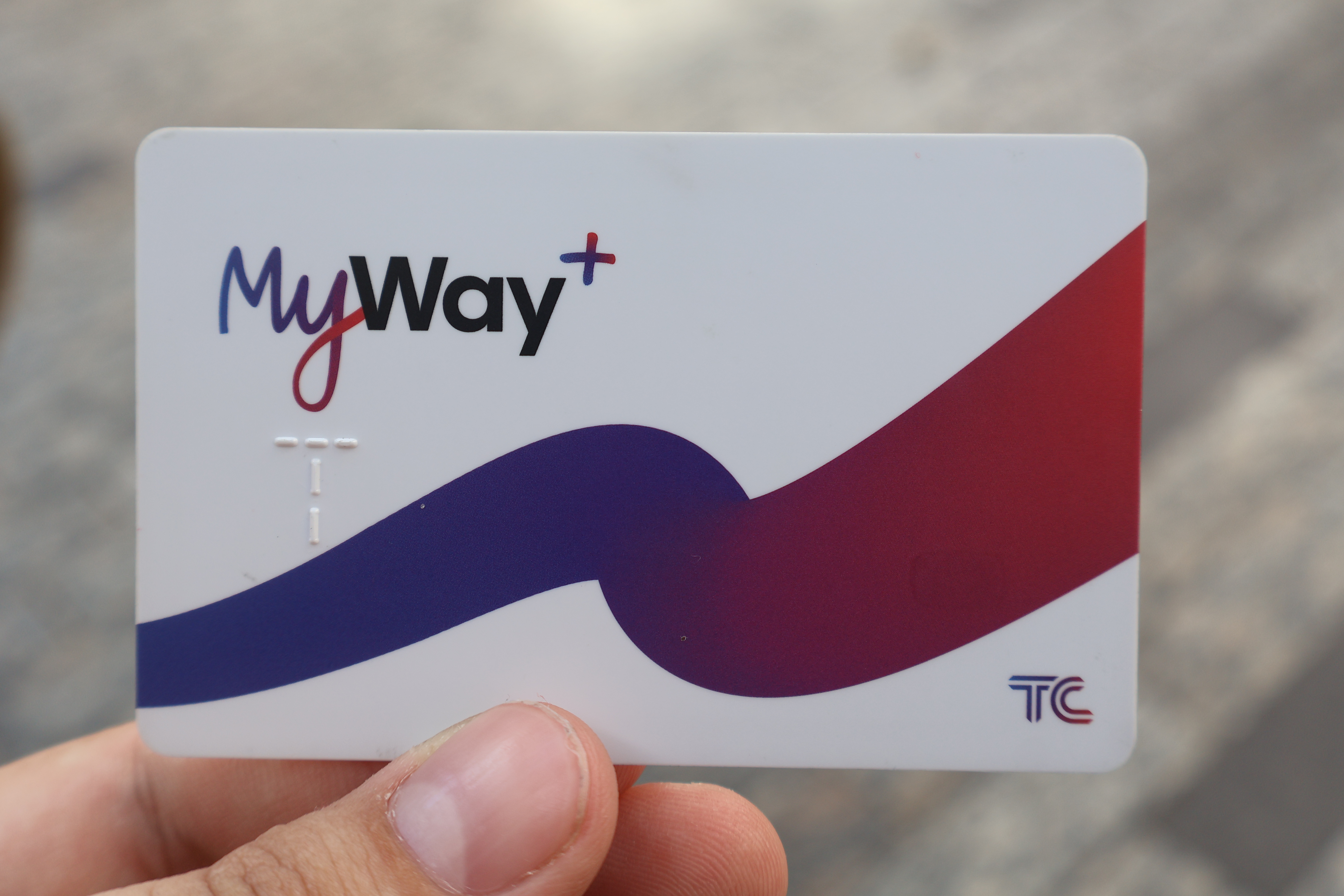
- Location: Canberra
- Launched: MyWay: February 2011; MyWay+: November 2024
- Technology: Contactless smart card
- Operator: NEC
- Manager: Transport Canberra
- Currency: AUD ($120 maximum load)
- Stored-value: Pay as you go
- Credit expiry: MyWay: After two years of inactivity MyWay+: no expiry
- Auto recharge: Auto top-up
- Validity: ACTION; Light Rail
- Retailed: Online; Canberra Connect shopfronts; MyWay Centres; MyWay Recharge agents
- Website: www.transport.act.gov.au

MyWay+ is the electronic ticketing system used on public transport services within Canberra in the Australian Capital Territory. It is promoted by Transport Canberra and is valid on ACTION buses and Canberra Light Rail. The previous MyWay system was replaced with the MyWay+ system in 2024.

== History ==
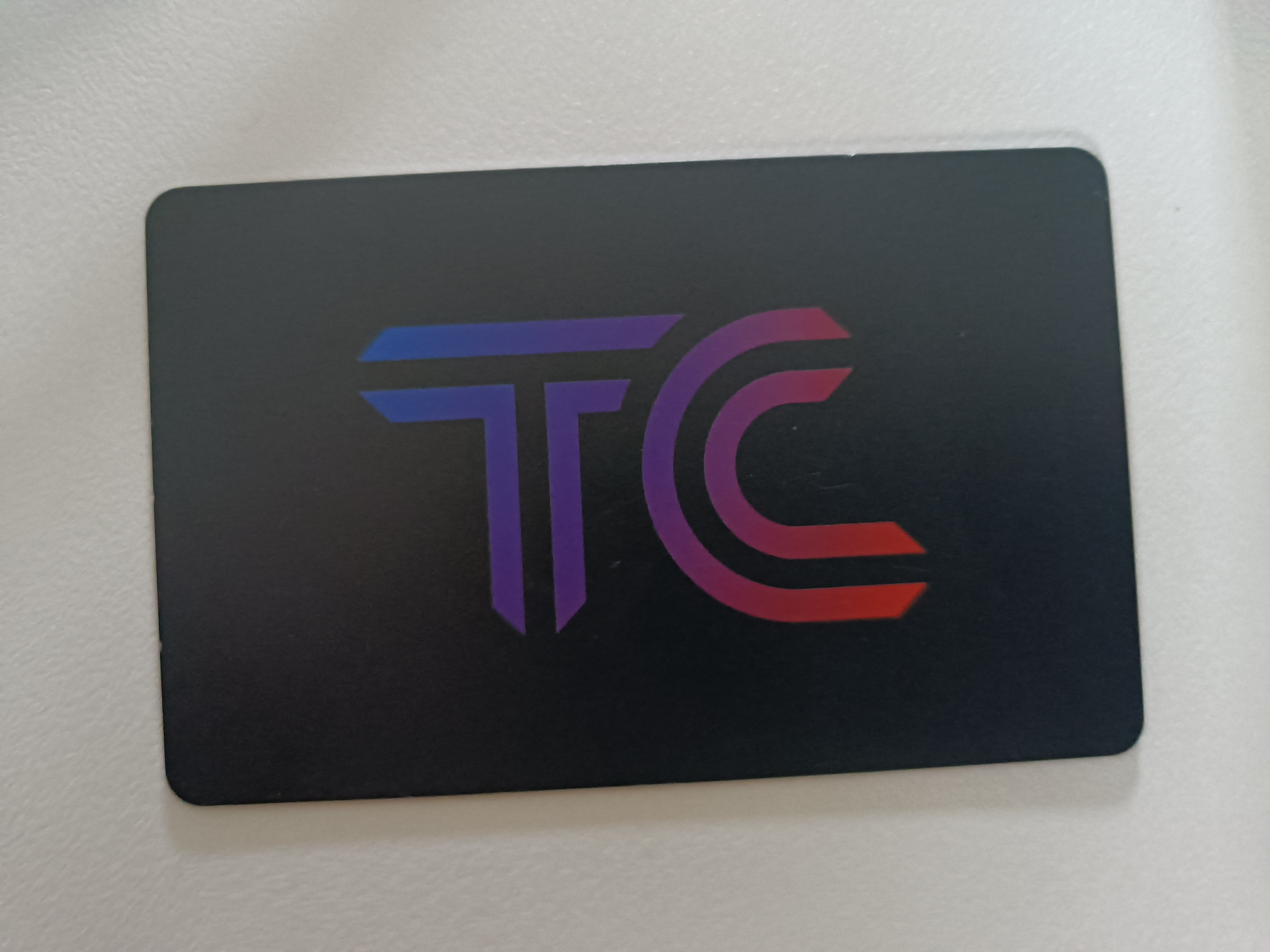
The last design of the original MyWay card, used from 2011-2024

MyWay cards were made available to ACT Seniors Card-holders on 21 February 2011 and released to the remainder of the community on 7 March 2011. ACTION's former magnetic strip tickets continued to be valid during a transition period until 11 April 2011.

The MyWay system used contactless smart cards with MIFARE technology onto which credit was loaded. Passengers were required to 'tag on' when boarding the bus or entering a light rail station and 'tag off' when exiting, at which point the appropriate fare was calculated and deducted from the stored value on the card. A further 5% discount on single-trip fares applied if the MyWay card was topped up using direct debit or BPAY.

The MyWay system used Parkeon software and equipment including Wayfarer 200 consoles and Axio card readers. The system was built and installed by Parkeon's Australian distributor, Downer EDI. Instead of being developed from scratch, MyWay was adapted from Transperth's SmartRider system which also uses Parkeon hardware and software.

In September 2017, Transport Canberra began looking for a replacement system, which was capable of integrating with an online portal for customers to manage their card balance digitally and receive alerts about their transport services. Furthermore, the system was also incapable of handling payment using debit/credit cards, and needed to be replaced before the shutdown of the 3G network. In February 2023, it was announced that NEC had been awarded the contract to develop the new system, named MyWay+.

The MyWay system was switched off on 20 September 2024, as well as the NXTBUS real-time information system. A fare-free travel period was active whilst MyWay scanners were uninstalled and replaced with MyWay+ hardware. The MyWay system was not compatible with the MyWay+ system so users had to transfer their previous MyWay card balance to their MyWay+ account, or apply for a refund. ACTION buses scheduled for decommission did not receive MyWay+ readers, with travel remaining free on these services until they were withdrawn.

The MyWay+ system officially began service on 27 November 2024.

== Payment types ==
=== MyWay+ card ===
The following types of MyWay+ card are available:

- Adult: $5.00
- Concession: $2.50
- Seniors: Free

=== Contactless payments ===
The MyWay+ system allows users to tag on and off using their Mastercard or Visa debit/credit card, or by scanning a unique QR code generated in the MyWay+ app.

== Fares ==
All Transport Canberra fares include a free 90-minute transfer period so you can connect to different bus or light rail services using the same ticket for free within 90 minutes of first validation.

During a year-long trial period, travel on buses and light rail services was free every Friday for everyone under a fare-free Friday initiative.

Off-peak discounts apply between 9:00 am and 4:30 pm, after 6:00 pm on weekdays, and all day weekends and public holidays.

== Operation ==
The MyWay+ system works by tagging a card to readers on board buses and at light rail stations at the start and end of a journey.

== Infrastructure ==
=== Retail outlets ===
Several retail outlets in Canberra allow passengers to purchase a new adult or concession MyWay+ card, as well as top up an existing MyWay+ card.

=== Ticket vending machines ===
Ticket vending machines can be used to purchase single use tickets, and to check and top-up MyWay+ balance. In December 2025, they were available at the following locations:

- Gungahlin Place bus interchange - platform 4
- Westfield Belconnen bus interchange - inside the shopping centre entrance off Lathlain Street
- City bus interchange - platform 4
- Woden temporary bus interchange - platform 6
- Tuggeranong bus interchange - between platforms 3 and 8
- Canberra Airport - next to the baggage claim area
- all light rail stops.

== Reception ==
More than 6.7 million journeys were taken using MyWay+ in the first seven months of operation.

As of 2 July 2025, more than 137,100 passengers had set up a MyWay+ account and over 118,300 MyWay+ cards were in circulation.

== Criticism ==
The launch of MyWay+ was criticised for unreliability, with customers reporting card scanners displaying error messages, and many users being unable to access the MyWay+ app and website. MyWay+ card shortages were also feared as retailers were quick ran out of stock. Users reported that real-time information was not available on launch day, with the MyWay+ journey planner showing only scheduled times. Whilst this issue was resolved, the real-time data feed for bus services is not yet available to third-party transport apps, such as Google Maps and Anytrip.

MyWay ticket vending machines were also yet to be replaced with MyWay+ ticket vending machines. The installation of these was initially delayed to December 2024, before being pushed back indefinitely. Transport Canberra asked customers to use another payment method in the interim. The ACT Government later conceded the MyWay+ launch should have been delayed by at least a week, despite Transport Canberra's confidence in the system. Installation of MyWay+ ticket vending machines took place in May 2025.

== See also ==
- Opal – Sydney's public transport ticketing system
- myki – Melbourne's public transport ticketing system
- go card – Brisbane's public transport ticketing system
- SmartRider – Perth's public transport ticketing system
- metroCARD – Adelaide's public transport ticketing system
