= TransBunbury =

Australian public bus system

- TransBunbury Mercedes-Benz O405NH at Bunbury Terminal
- Parent: Public Transport Authority
- Founded: January 1986
- Headquarters: Bunbury
- Service area: Bunbury
- Service type: Bus services
- Routes: 12 (04.2024)
- Hubs: Bunbury Bus Station
- Fleet: 33 (May 2014)
- Operator: Swan Transit
- Website: www.pta.wa.gov.au

TransBunbury is the public bus transport system in Bunbury, Western Australia, consisting of 12 public routes as well as 30 school routes.

== History ==
The former Bunbury City Transit logo

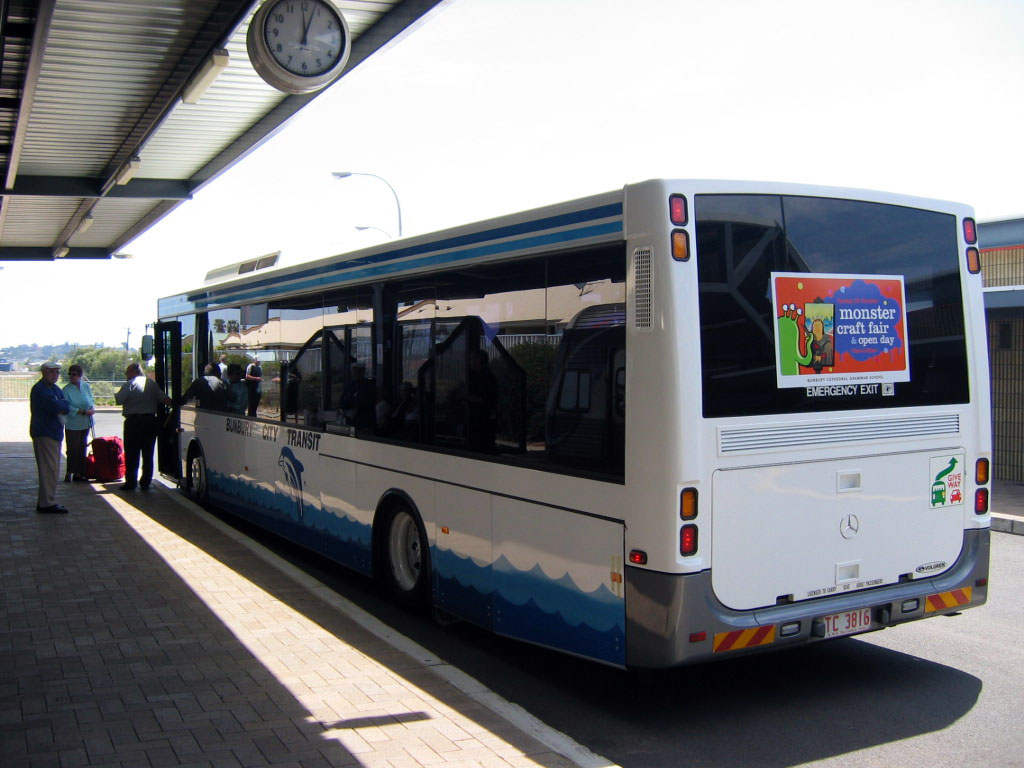
Bunbury City Transit bus in October 2006

Bunbury City Transit was established in January 1986. On 2 May 2011 it was rebranded as TransBunbury. The main bus station was built from the old Bunbury Railway Station, being replaced by a new bus & train terminal in East Bunbury. Shortly after TransGeraldton, TransBunbury received SmartRider machines along with many other TransRegional services in 2009.

== Operations ==
Until 31 December 2014, the service was operated by South West Coach Lines. Upon being re-tendered, it passed to Swan Transit, with a new 10-year contract commencing on 1 January 2015.

The SmartRider card is valid for use on TransBunbury services.

== Terminus ==
TransBunbury's main terminus is the Bunbury Bus Station, located in central Bunbury. The service also has major terminuses located near the Bunbury Terminal, Bunbury Health Campus, and Australind.

== Fleet ==
As of September 2020, TransBunbury operates a fleet of 37 buses, consisting of a mixture of Volvo B7RLE, Mercedes Benz OC500LE and Mercedes-Benz O405NH buses, all of which are ex-Transperth. Upon being rebranded as TransBunbury in May 2011, the Bunbury City Transit white and blue livery was replaced by Transperth's silver and green livery.

== Routes ==
Route number	Departs From	Departs To	Via
825	Bunbury Bus Stn	Dolphin Discovery Centre	
826	Bunbury Bus Stn	Bunbury Passenger Terminal	
827	Bunbury Bus Stn	Glen Iris	
828	Bunbury Bus Stn	Bunbury Health Campus	Carey Park
829	Bunbury Bus Stn	Bunbury Health Campus	Park Shopping Centre
830	Bunbury Bus Stn	College Grove	
832	Bunbury Bus Stn	Bunbury Health Campus	Bunbury Plaza
841	Bunbury Bus Stn	Australind	Australind Shopping Centre
842	Carey Park	Dallyellup	
843	Bunbury Bus Stn	Dallyellup	
844	Bunbury Bus Stn	Eaton/Millibridge	
845	Bunbury Bus Stn	Australind	Eaton Fair Shopping Centre
