= MetroCARD =

Public transport payment system used in Adelaide

metroCARD
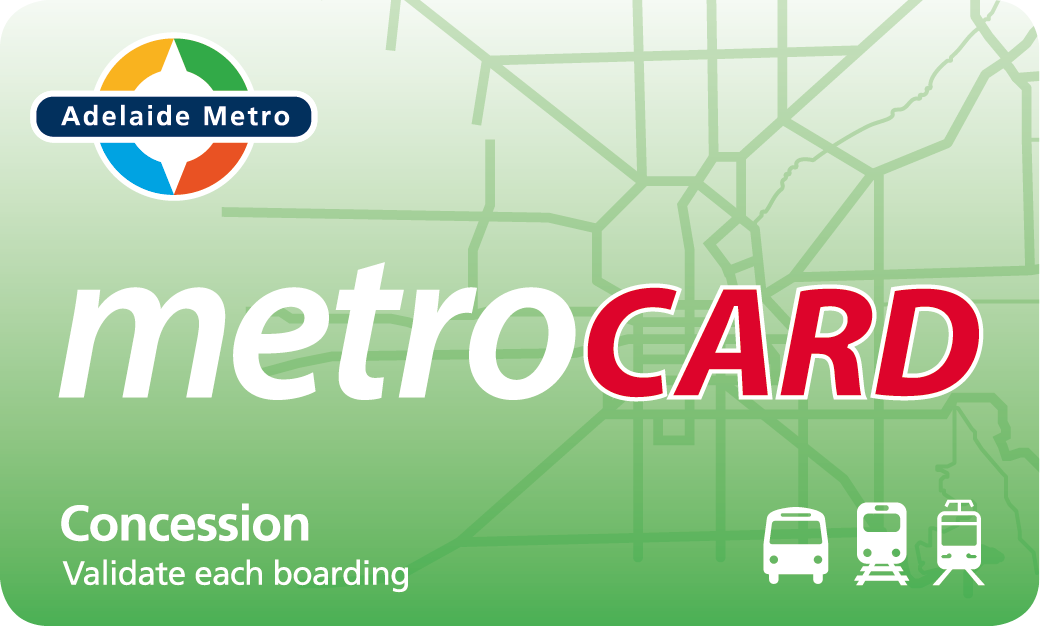
- Location: Adelaide
- Launched: 3 November 2012
- Technology: MIFARE
- Manager: Adelaide Metro
- Currency: AUD ($5 minimum load, $200 maximum load)
- Stored-value: Two-hour unlimited trips from first validation
- Auto recharge: Optional
- Validity: Bus; Train; Tram
- Variants: Regular; Student; Senior; Concession
- Website: www.adelaidemetro.com.au

metroCARD is a contactless smartcard ticketing system for public transport services in the city (and surrounding suburbs) of Adelaide, South Australia. The system is managed by Adelaide Metro and is usable on their bus, train and tram services.

The contract for the system was tendered out, and in 2010 was awarded to Affiliated Computer Services using technology used in – among others – Montreal, Canada; Houston, Texas; and Toulouse, France. It was originally scheduled to become fully operative in early 2013. After a positive response from trial users, it was launched in November 2012. Since 2020, upgrades have enabled commuters to use a Mastercard, Visa, or Adelaide Metro's Buy & Go app to pay for their journeys.

== History ==
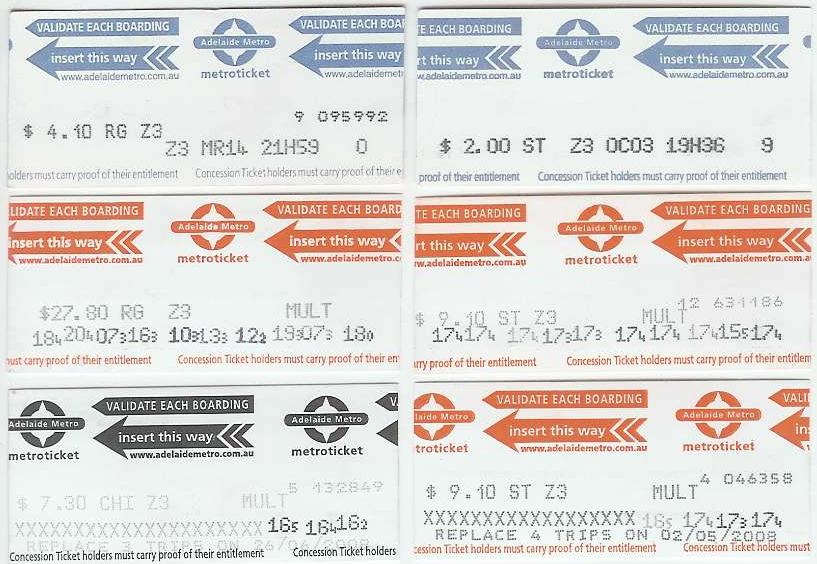
Old Crouzet tickets

The original ticketing system was based on the Crouzet system and was provided by Affiliated Computer Services. It was introduced in 1987 and was intended to be used for only a few years before being replaced. Replacement plans soon fell through and the original equipment remained in use until 2012. In 2010, it was announced that Affiliated Computer Services had been awarded the contract to replace the aging Crouzet system with a new contactless smartcard system, which would allow the Edmondson-sized magnetic stripe tickets to remain in use.

As a result of the new system, multi-trip tickets were no longer sold as Crouzet tickets. metroCARDs replaced them, and Seniors tickets were replaced by the Seniors Card. Single and day-trip tickets continued to be sold as Edmondson-sized magnetic stripe tickets until their complete withdrawal in 2026. Passengers could trade in their existing Multitrip tickets for metroCARD trips. From December 2014, validators no longer accepted Multitrip tickets, however users could continue to convert them to metroCARD trips until 28 February 2015. Single trip paper tickets remained available until 2026.

In 2013, it was announced that metroCARDs would be able to be used to access secure bike cages at railway stations fitted with the necessary equipment. In the same year it was also announced that, as part of the Tea Tree Plaza Interchange park & ride upgrade, metroCARD users would be able to use their metroCARD to pay for parking.

In 2019, it was announced by the Marshall government that the ability to pay for a cheaper "two-section fare" for shorter trips would be removed in an effort to reduce fare evasion and simplify the fare structure to a single flat fare, regardless of distance travelled. The opposition claimed that there was no evidence that two-section fares were to blame for fare evasion.

In early 2020, Adelaide Metro began trials of contactless payments on trams. The rollout involved the installation of new Conduent contactless validators which accept physical bank cards, digital bank cards, and QR codes. The upgrades have enabled commuters to use a Mastercard, Visa, or Adelaide Metro's Buy & Go app to pay for their journeys. Payments using the new contactless validators are processed by Commonwealth Bank.

In mid 2022, the rollout was extended to O-Bahn buses. In mid 2023, the rollout was extended to all buses.

In mid 2023, the state government announced $7 million in funding for the rollout of contactless payments on the Adelaide Metro rail network. The rollout was completed on 20 February 2026, after which paper tickets were no longer accepted on any Adelaide Metro service. The rollout has allowed commuters to transfer between all public transport modes using contactless payments.

== Payment types ==
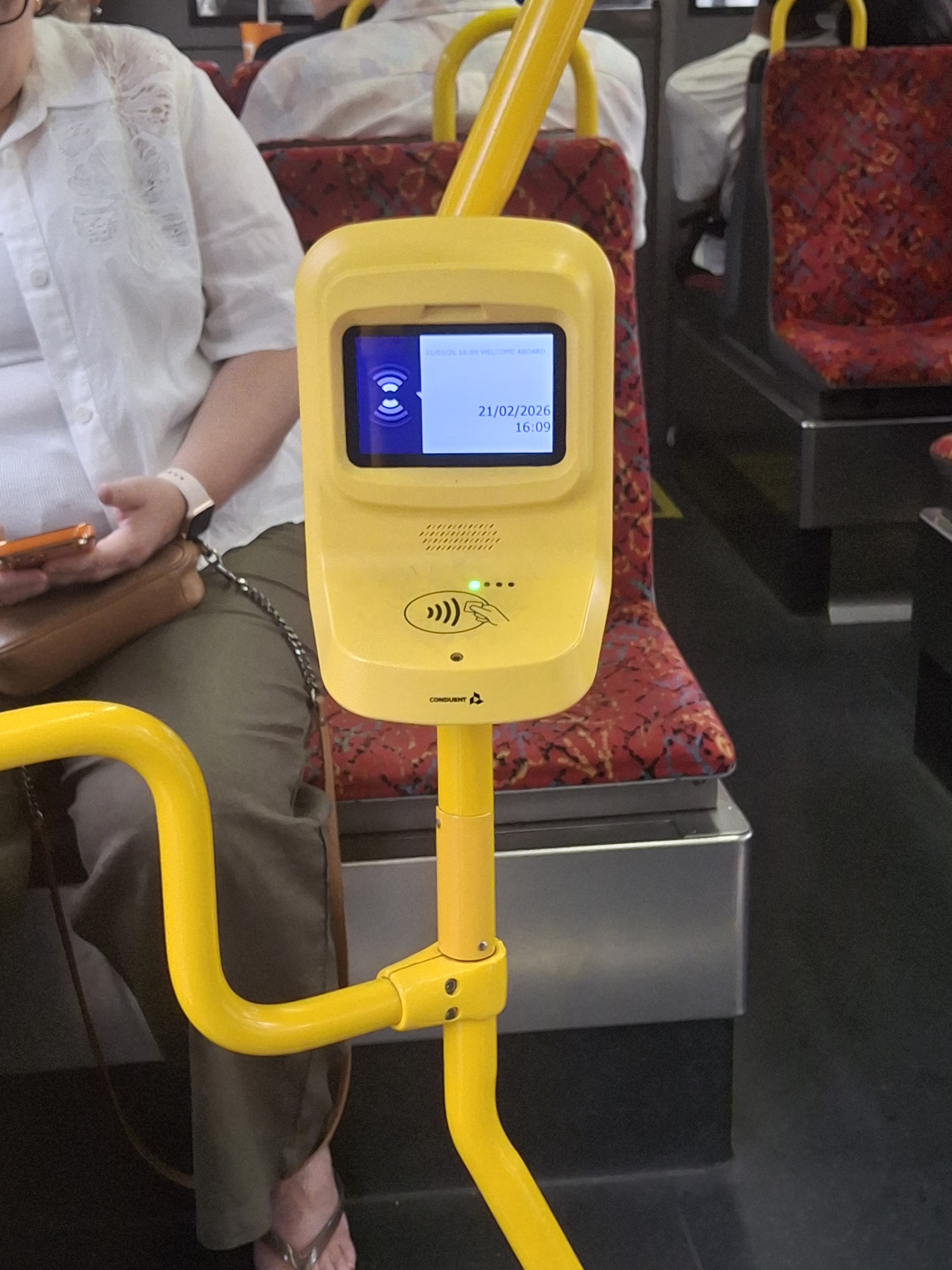
An Adelaide Metro validator that accepts all forms of tickets

=== metroCARD ===
There are four main types of metroCARD:

- Regular metroCARD - for all passengers. These cards are blue and say 'Regular'.
- Concession metroCARDs - for tertiary students and other government issued concession card holders (e.g., Veterans health card) These cards are green and say 'Concession'.
- Student metroCARDs - for primary and secondary school students (Students over 15 are required to carry a South Australian Government approved Student ID). These cards are orange and say 'Student'.
- Seniors Card - South Australian issued Seniors cards are pre-programmed for use as metroCARDs. Travel is free for Seniors card holders, but the card must still be validated for travel. Seniors cards feature the metroCARD logo.

metroCARDs can be purchased from eligible retailers, the Adelaide Metro InfoCentre at Adelaide railway station, online, or by using a ticket machine located at select train stations and bus interchanges. Regular metroCARDs cost $5 to purchase and are subject to full priced fares. Student or concession metroCARDs cost $3.50, and are subject to discounted fares.

metroCARDs are rechargeable, and passengers can add value at any time online, or by using a ticket machine at select bus stations or on board trains and trams. Regular commuters are encouraged to set up auto-recharge, whereby a direct-debit payment of a set amount is taken each time the metroCARD value falls below the value of a peak fare. Additionally, metroCARDs can be loaded with Singletrips, Daytrips, 3-Day Visitor Passes, 14-day passes and 28-day passes. These allow for unlimited travel on the Adelaide Metro network until expiry.

=== Contactless payments ===
Following the rollout of new readers, commuters can use a Mastercard, Visa, or Adelaide Metro's Buy & Go app to pay for their journeys on all bus, train and tram services. Regular fares can be paid for with a Mastercard or Visa; concession and student fares cannot be paid for using this method.

The Buy & Go app allows smartphone users to create an account and purchase the full range of Adelaide Metro fares, including concession and student fares. Buy & Go fares are validated with a QR code.

== Fares ==
The Adelaide Metro network operates on a flat fare system. A Singletrip lasts 2 hours, and passengers can transfer between trains, trams and buses at any time during this period without incurring any additional fees. A Daytrip lasts all day, and passengers can transfer between trains, trams and buses at any time during this period without incurring any additional fees. Eligible concession and student passengers are charged discounted fares, and are required to have valid proof of their concession or student ID.

From 1 October 2026, the following fares apply to Adelaide Metro train, tram, and bus services:

Fare type	Peak			Off-peak		
Fare type	Regular	Concession	Student	Regular	Concession	Student
Buy & Go	$4.75	$2.35	$1.65	$2.70	$1.35	
metroCARD	$4.75	$2.35	$1.65	$2.70	$1.35	
Tap and Pay	$4.75	—N/a	—N/a	$2.70	—N/a	—N/a
Singletrip	$6.80	$3.40		$4.50	$1.60	
Daytrip	$12.90	$6.50		—N/a	—N/a	—N/a
3-day pass	$29.90	—N/a	—N/a	—N/a	—N/a	—N/a
14-day pass	$74.20	$37.00	—N/a	—N/a	—N/a	—N/a
28-day pass	$123.00	$61.60	$10.30	—N/a	—N/a	—N/a
Seniors Card	Free					

Free services include buses 98A, 98C, 99A, and 99C, trams between Entertainment Centre and Botanic Gardens, and trams between Brighton Road and Moseley Square.

== Operation ==
Passengers validate their cards upon boarding a vehicle and when passing through ticket gates. The appropriate fare is calculated and deducted from the stored value on the card. If the fare for a trip is greater than the stored value remaining, the card cannot be validated again until it has been recharged.

== Infrastructure ==
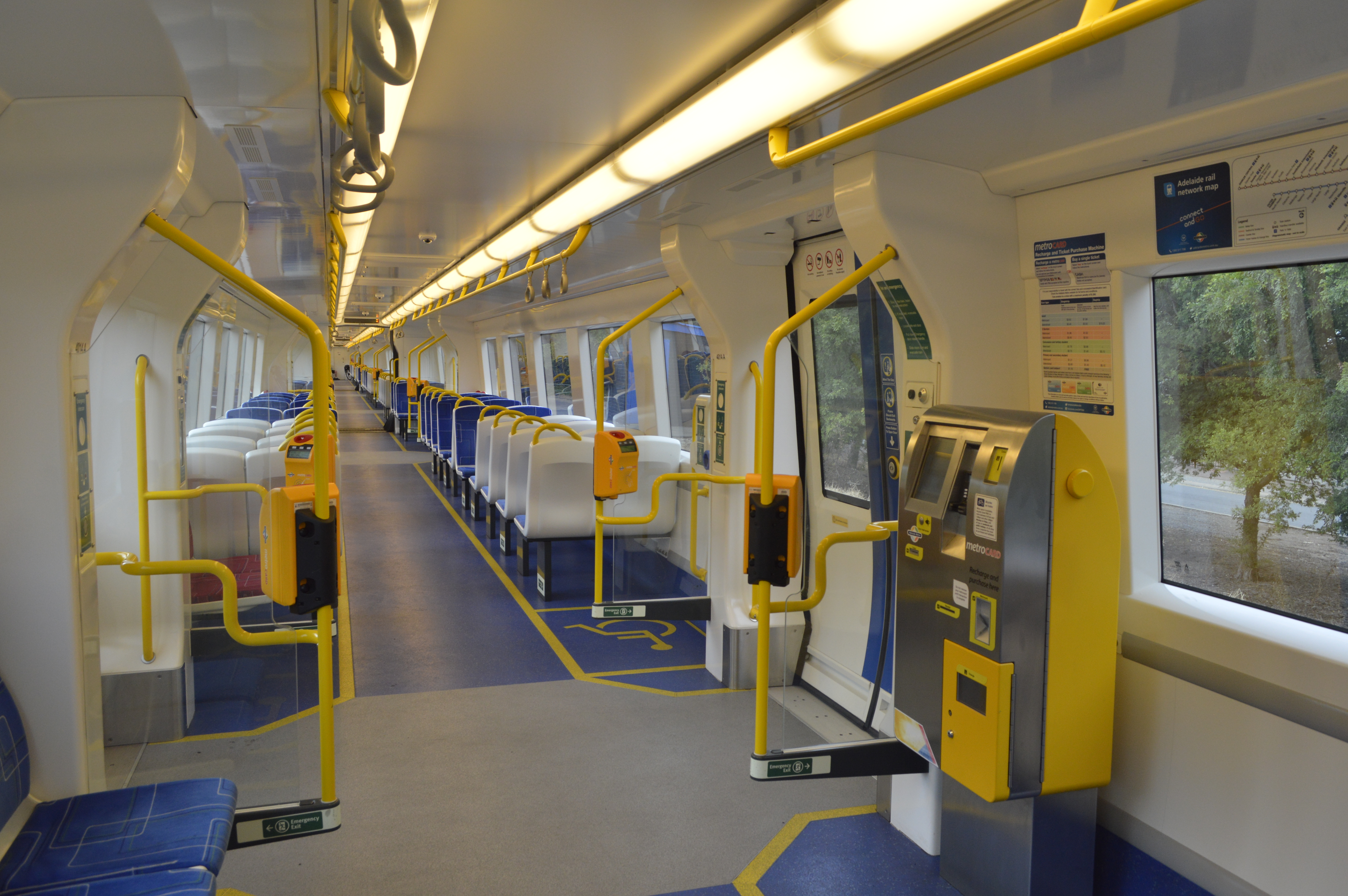
Older style ticket validators and a ticket machine, positioned at the doorways of an Adelaide Metro 4000 class

=== Ticket validators ===
Ticket validators are located onboard all buses, trains and trams, as well as at Adelaide railway station. The validators accept metroCARDs and contactless payments. The validators feature an LCD showing information to users, such as debited value, metroCARD balance or pass expiry date and whether the transaction was successful.

=== Ticket machines ===
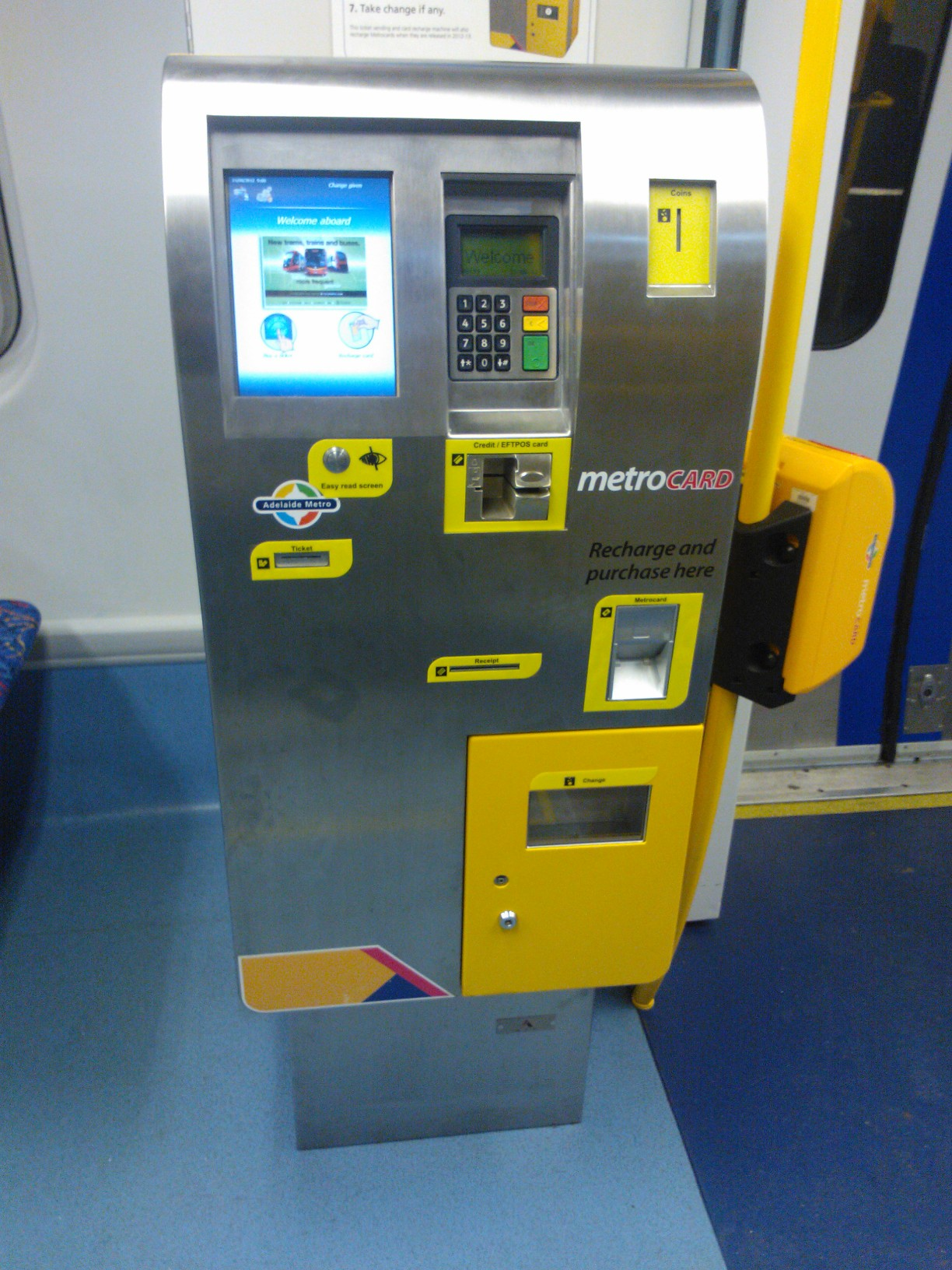
metroCARD ticket machine located on a 3000 class railcar

==== Purchase ====
These ticket machines are located in the main passenger concourse at Adelaide railway station and in the public bus stop shelter at Adelaide Airport. They differ from other ticket machines in that they both dispense and recharge all three metroCARD types. These machines have a larger touchscreen, allowing for selection of different ticket types and payment methods. Payment methods accepted by this machine are coins (except 5c pieces), notes (except $50 and $100 notes), and EFTPOS.

==== Recharge ====
These ticket machines are located on every train and tram for recharging metroCARDs and checking card balance. They do not dispense metroCARDs. These machines accept coins and EFTPOS payments, but not notes, which was a common criticism of the previous generation ticket machines. A similar version of this ticket machine is located at several of the city tram stops, the Adelaide Metro InfoCentres, and some major interchanges where they accept EFTPOS payments only (no coins or notes).

== See also ==
- Opal – Sydney's public transport ticketing system
- myki – Melbourne's public transport ticketing system
- go card – Brisbane's public transport ticketing system
- SmartRider – Perth's public transport ticketing system
- MyWay+ – Canberra's public transport ticketing system
