= Go card =

Smartcard ticketing system

go card
- Location: South East Queensland, Australia
- Launched: 2006 (trial)
- Discontinued: 2026
- Technology: MIFARE Classic
- Operator: Cubic Corporation
- Manager: Translink
- Auto recharge: Yes
- Retailed: Online; Telephone; Train Stations; Ticket Vending Machines (TVMs)
- Website: www.translink.com.au

The go card is an electronic smartcard ticketing system currently used on the Translink public transport network (trains, trams, buses, ferries) in South East Queensland, Australia. The go card is used by holding it less than 10 cm away from a card reader to "touch on" before starting a journey, and to "touch off" before finishing a journey. The cost of each journey is deducted from the go card balance.

The Queensland Government awarded the $134 million contract to design, build, operate and maintain the system to Cubic Corporation in July 2003. Up to 1,000 volunteers trialed the system at Redcliffe in July 2006. The system was officially launched throughout South East Queensland in February 2008.

As of 25 May 2025, the system covers an area of 10,000 km^{2} and is currently available at 154 train stations, 19 tram stops, on 2,200 buses, and 36 ferries.

A new physical and digital Translink card will replace the go card in 2026.

== History ==
=== Rollout ===
In July 2003, the Queensland Government awarded the $134 million contract to design, build, operate and maintain the go card system to Cubic Corporation.

In July 2006, Translink registered around 1,000 volunteers to test out the new go card equipment in Redcliffe. Translink installed the equipment on Hornibrook Bus Lines, Sunbus Sunshine Coast, and later Brisbane Transport buses. Translink also installed the equipment at Petrie, Sandgate, Brunswick Street, Central and Roma Street stations.

The go card was officially launched throughout South East Queensland in February 2008. During the launch, Translink had staff on hand at rail stations and major bus interchanges to talk to passengers and answer any questions.

On 4 August 2008, all go card fares received a discount of 20% compared to paper tickets. Regular users who traveled more than 10 journeys within a week received an additional discount of 50% off the price of any extra journeys.

On 4 January 2010, Translink gave away 400,000 free go cards loaded with $10 credit. Users also received off-peak discounts and automatic top-up.

Originally, Translink had proposed to scrap paper-based ticketing entirely. Following controversy over this proposal, single-trip paper tickets were retained whilst other paper ticket formats (daily, weekly, monthly, off-peak) were abolished. Apart from frequent user schemes, periodic ticketing formats have not been introduced for go card since its inception.

On 24 November 2015, Cubic was awarded a three-year contract extension until 2019. The system continued to grow, with Cubic supplying ticketing equipment for the Gold Coast light rail system; the new rail line and stations at Springfield in Brisbane; and the extension of the ferry service to the Southern Moreton Bay Islands.

=== SEEQ card ===
In 2012, Translink introduced the SEEQ card targeting tourists.

The SEEQ card operated similarly to the go card, but included:

- unlimited travel within the Translink region for 3 or 5 consecutive days from the first trip
- Adult or Child fare classes (no Concession or Senior fare classes)
- expiry 12 months after the date of purchase if not used
- 2 trips to/from Brisbane Airport via the Airport line

In 2014, Translink discontinued the SEEQ card.

=== CityCycle integration ===
In March 2012, then opposition transport spokesman, Scott Emerson, proposed integrating go cards with the CityCycle bicycle hire scheme. From November 2012, it became possible for CityCycle subscribers to link their go card account to their CityCycle account, the latter of which also operated on a smartcard based system. However, the integration did not allow charges to be deducted directly from the go card account balance. Instead, charges were deducted from a linked credit or debit card. In July 2021, the CityCycle bicycle hire scheme was decommissioned.

=== Replacement ===
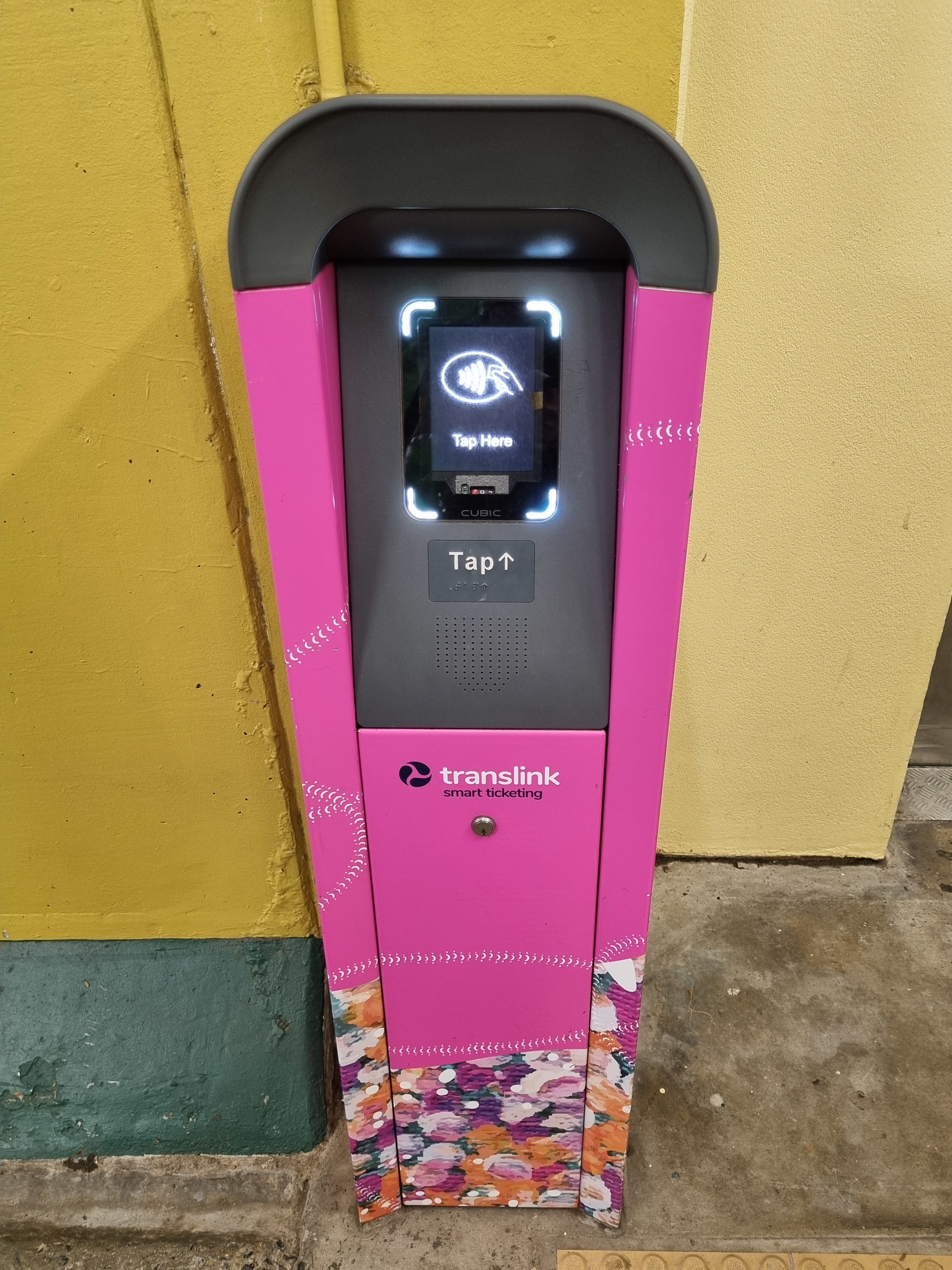
A Translink card reader

Contactless payments were introduced across all modes of public transport in South East Queensland between 2020 and 2025. The system enables passengers to pay for their journey using a contactless MasterCard or Visa, including those stored in a smartphone or smartwatch. The system was successfully implemented on G:link trams in 2021, Queensland Rail trains in 2023, Brisbane City ferries in 2024, and South East Queensland buses in 2025. A new physical and digital Translink card will replace the go card in 2026.

== Payment types ==
=== Go card ===
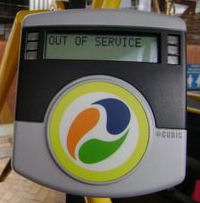
A go card reader

The go card is available in Adult, Child, Concession and Seniors fare types:

- Adult is for use by passengers without a concession. Tertiary students, job seekers and asylum seekers are eligible to have concession fares activated on this card.
- Child is for use by passengers under the age of 15 years.
- Concession is for use by passengers with a concession. Secondary students, holders of a Pensioner Concession Card, and holders of a Repatriation Health Card are eligible.
- Seniors is for use by passengers with a Queensland Seniors Card issued by the Queensland Government.
- Seniors+go combines the Queensland Seniors Card and go card into one.

=== Go Explore card ===
In 2014, Translink launched the go explore card to coincide with the official opening of the Gold Coast light rail system. The go explore card offers visitors unlimited travel on any Translink bus or tram on the Gold Coast or Sunshine Coast for just $1.50 a day. It can be reloaded with up to 8-day passes at any one time.

=== Go Access Vision Impaired Travel Pass (VITP) card ===
In 2015, Translink launched a new dual purpose travel card for people with visual impairment. Developed in consultation with Vision Australia and Guide Dogs Queensland, the go access VITP uses smartcard technology to open fare gates at train stations without the assistance of a station staff member and has raised tactile elements to help vision-impaired customers identify the card. VITP holders are entitled to free travel across all Translink services and on other services provided by participating interstate transport operators.

=== Go Event card ===
In 2016, Translink introduced the go event card. The go event card is a ticketing solution for conference and event organisers to provide easy travel for delegates around South East Queensland, via the Translink network. The card costs $4.50 and allows unlimited travel for three days across bus, train, ferry and tram services.

=== Go Business card ===
In 2016, Translink introduced the go business card. The go business card is a ticketing solution for businesses and organisations to provide easy travel for employees around South East Queensland, via the Translink network. The card allows unlimited travel across bus, train, ferry and tram services.

== Fares ==
Originally there were 23 zones radiating out from the Brisbane central business district. On 19 December 2016, these were consolidated into eight zones.

In August 2024, a flat 50 cent per journey fare structure was introduced in a six-month trial by the Labor Miles government, eliminating the zonal system. In December 2024, it was announced by the newly elected Liberial Crisafulli government that 50 cent fares would become permanent.

== Operation ==
When purchasing a go card, a refundable deposit is applied, on top of the starting balance. The deposit allows users to finish their journey even when they have insufficient funds on the go card, although the go card has to have a positive balance at the start of the journey.

To use the go card, users need to hold their card less than 10 cm away from the reader to "touch on" and do the same to "touch off" at the end of each journey or segment travelled (this includes switching between train and tram at Helensvale station).

For inter-modal travel, Translink allows go card users to transfer between services (up to 3 times and within 3 and a half hours) without being regarded as having started a new journey.

The fare is calculated and deducted from the go card balance each time the user touches off, based on the number of zones travelled through since the first segment of the journey. On a transfer segment, the user is only charged the difference between the amount already charged and the total fare for the journey.

Users who do not "touch off" are charged a fixed amount which is currently $2.50 for all modes except Airtrain. In the event of inadvertent error, technical faults or other excusable circumstances, penalty fares can be adjusted via the Translink website (for registered go cards) or telephone call centre.

== Infrastructure ==
=== Card retailers ===
The go card is available for purchase at more than 680 locations, with top up services for existing go cards available at 1,600 South East Queensland locations. These locations include staffed Queensland Rail station ticket offices, fare machines at busways, key bus interchanges, train stations and tram stations and on board Brisbane CityCats and CityFerries. Selected bus operators are also able to top-up cards on board, although this is not implemented on services operated by Brisbane Transport.

In 2014, Translink was able to expand the go card retail network, using Cubic's NextLink technology. The Transport and Main Roads innovative technological solution, saw go card services integrated with point-of-sale equipment at all 7-Eleven convenience and fuel outlets. This made an additional 75 locations available to sell, top up and expiry change services for go card and go explore. However, in 2020 7-Eleven stores stopped providing go card retail services.

Users who register their go card online have access to an online portal to enable them to perform automatic and manual top-ups via credit card, report fare issues, maintain their details and download transaction histories. Further, the balance of registered cards can be permanently transferred to another card and the account balance can be frozen if the go card is reported as lost or stolen. Translink also operates a phone hotline for customer service, card top-ups and enquiries.

=== Card readers ===
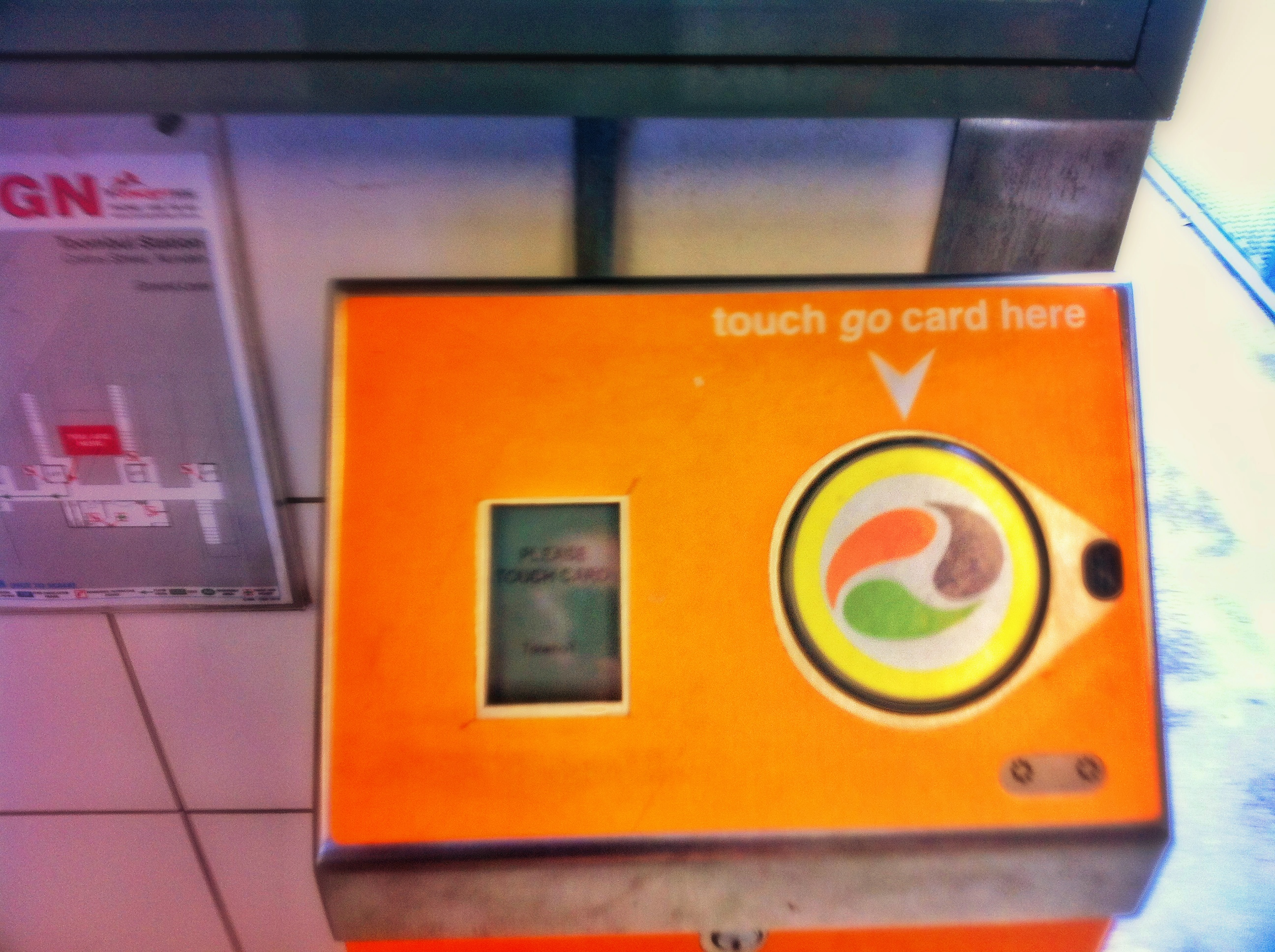
A go card reader

Card readers are installed on each bus and ferry operating within the Translink network. On the Queensland Rail network, card readers are located at each train station, rather than on each train and the same applies to the G:link tram network located on the Gold Coast which have card readers located at each tram station. Authorised Officers are equipped with portable card readers.

== Reception ==
Translink publishes reporting of the uptake of go card in its annual reports. go card is the most widely used ticketing product on the Translink network, representing 87% of all trips taken in the quarter ended June 2016.

In January 2010, in a move to encourage the use of the go card, Translink changed the fare structure by increasing the price of paper tickets to make the go card cheaper than paper tickets. In some cases the increase was as much as 40%. Although more users were using the go card than before, the move created another issue given the limited number of train stations selling the go card at the time. Some users could not buy the go card and had to continue to use paper tickets with higher fares. In response, Translink confirmed more stations would begin selling the go card.

Translink fares continued a trend of "planned" increases by a factor of 15% per year in the 2010, 2011 and 2012 calendar years, sparking concerns about affordability. From 2013 the "planned" increase halved to 7.5%. Prior to August 2024, go card fares were 30% cheaper than paper-based ticket pricing.

== Criticism ==
In 2008, security experts found the cloning of a go card is possible, though no verified instances have yet been discovered, which allow people to clone and use other people's go cards. Translink has indicated that systems exist to detect fraudulent activity and reject cloned cards, however no details about these systems are available. In March 2010, a loophole was discovered that allowed go card users to avoid fares on buses by "touching off" at the back door after touching on at the first door, Translink confirmed that doing this would waive the fare.

== See also ==
- Opal – Sydney's public transport ticketing system
- myki – Melbourne's public transport ticketing system
- SmartRider – Perth's public transport ticketing system
- metroCARD – Adelaide's public transport ticketing system
- MyWay+ – Canberra's public transport ticketing system
