= TransGeraldton =

System of bus transport in Western Australia

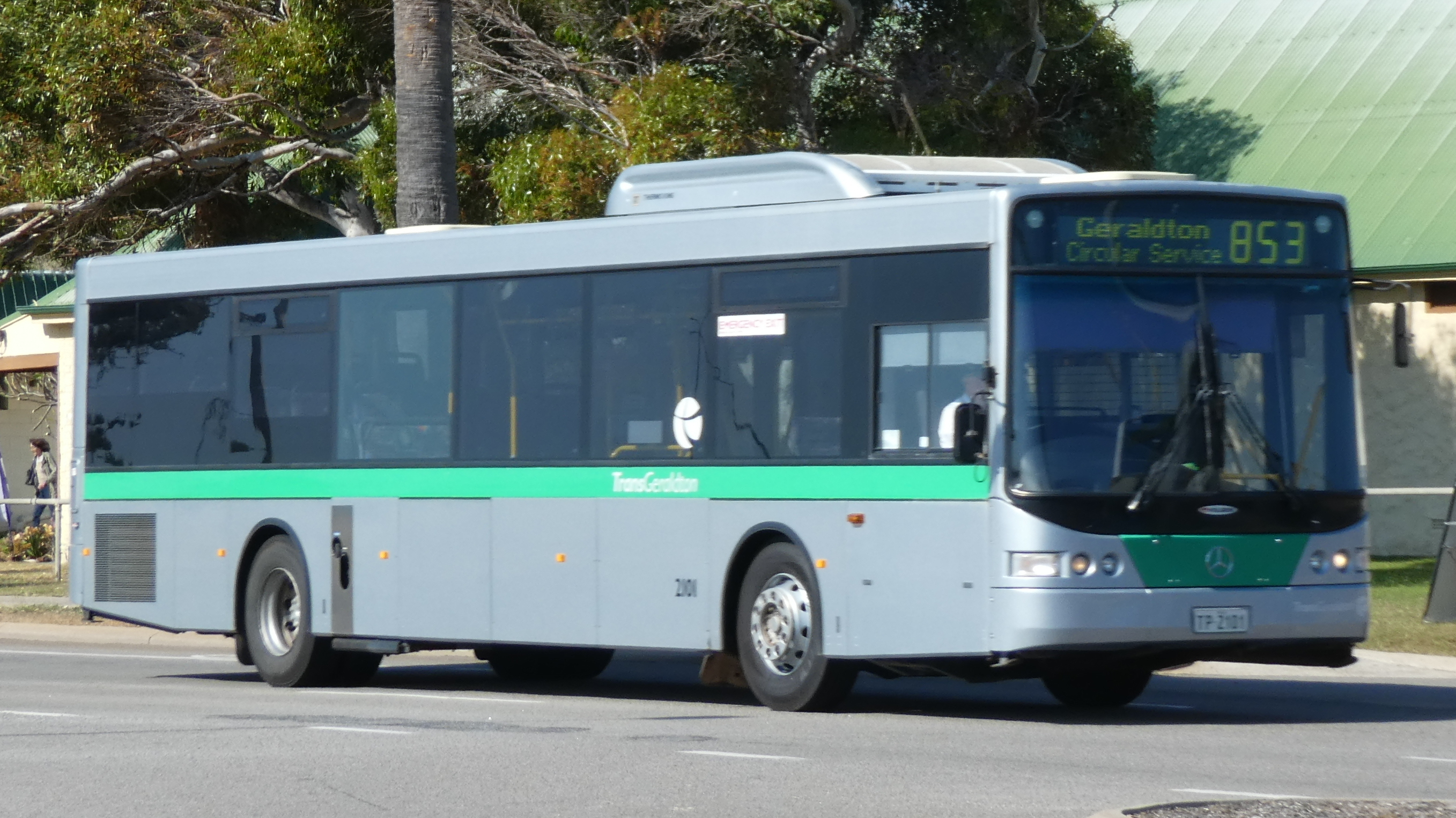
- Volgren bodied Mercedes-Benz OC500LE in September 2023
- Parent: Public Transport Authority
- Headquarters: Geraldton
- Service area: Geraldton
- Service type: Bus services
- Routes: 8
- Hubs: Anzac Terrace, Geraldton
- Fleet: 19 (December 2012)
- Operator: Path Transit

TransGeraldton is the public bus transport system in Geraldton, Western Australia.

== History ==
Previously Geraldton's bus services were operated by Geraldton Bus Service, owned by Les Backshall.

They later became part of the Public Transport Authority's TransRegional scheme operated by the Australian Transit Group. Upon being re-tendered, the TransGeraldton services were taken over by Path Transit in 2019.

== Fleet ==
As at December 2012, the fleet consisted of 19 buses.
