= Public Transport Authority (Western Australia) =

Statutory authority for public transport in Western Australia

Agency overview
- Formed: 1 July 2003
- Preceding agencies: Western Australian Government Railways Commission; Department for Planning and Infrastructure
- Jurisdiction: Western Australia
- Headquarters: Public Transport Centre
- Employees: 1,654 (June 2015)
- Annual budget: $1.27 billion (2014/15)
- Agency executive: Peter Woronzow, Chief Executive Officer
- Website: www.pta.wa.gov.au

The Public Transport Authority (PTA) is a statutory authority that oversees the operation of all public transport in Western Australia.

== History ==
The Public Transport Authority was formed on 1 July 2003 in accordance with the Public Transport Authority Act 2003 as the body overseeing the provision of public transport in Western Australia. It operates bus, ferry and train services in Perth under the Transperth brand, regional road coach and train services in regional Western Australia under the Transwa brand and manages school bus services.

== Services ==
The Public Transport Authority runs many services. They are:

- Transperth: bus, ferry and train services in metropolitan Perth
- Transwa, operates regional road coach and train services in regional WA
- Transregional operates services in some regional cities and towns
  - TransAlbany, Albany
  - TransBroome, Broome
  - TransBunbury, Bunbury
  - TransBusselton, Busselton and Dunsborough
  - TransEsperance, Esperance
  - TransGeraldton, Geraldton
  - TransGoldfields, Kalgoorlie-Boulder
  - TransHedland, Port Hedland
  - TransKarratha, Karratha
- School Bus Services, providing school buses to children in rural and remote areas

== SmartRider ==
The Public Transport Authority introduced a smartcard for public transport fares, SmartRider, to replace MultiRiders from January 2007.

The card can be used on Transperth, TransAlbany, TransBunbury, TransBusselton, TransGeraldton, TransEsperance, TransHedland, TransKarratha and TransGoldfields services.

== Chief Executive Officers ==
The head of the Public Transport Authority is the Chief Executive Officer. From 2010, the PTA CEO position has been held by the Director General - Transport.

- Reece Waldock (1 July 2003 – 29 July 2016)
- Richard Sellers (July 2016 – March 2020)
- Peter Woronzow (November 2021 –)
