= MV Georgette =

Former ferry on the Swan River, Perth, Western Australia

History
- Name: MV Georgette
- Namesake: Georgette Adams
- Owner: Transperth
- Operator: Transperth
- Route: Barrack Street - Mends Street
- Builder: Alf Jahansteen, Forster
- In service: 9 February 1981

General characteristics
- Length: 15.0 metres
- Beam: 4.5 metres
- Decks: 1
- Propulsion: Gardner 5LW
- Speed: 19 knots
- Capacity: 92
- Crew: 2

MV Georgette was a ferry owned by Transperth on the Swan River in Perth, Western Australia.

== History ==
Georgette was built in 1981 by Alf Jahansen in Forster as Bardoo for use on Wallis Lake. However its draft was too great to cross sandbars at low tide, so in December 1981 it was sold for use on Port Hacking in Sydney. It was sold again in October 1982 to the Metropolitan Transport Trust and moved by road to be by refurbished by Precision Marine, North Fremantle.

It entered service on 5 July 1984, replacing Vlaming as backup ferry for MV Countess II. It was named Georgette after Georgette Adams, the long-time secretary of the Metropolitan Transport Trust's managing director.
