= MV Princess II =

Former ferry of Perth, Western Australia

History
- Name: MV Princess II
- Owner: Metropolitan Transport Trust / Transperth; Department of Transport
- Operator: Captain Cook Cruises
- Route: Barrack Street – Mends Street
- Builder: Hofland Engineering
- In service: October 1973
- Out of service: 1998

General characteristics
- Length: 17.1 metres
- Capacity: 100

MV Princess II was a ferry operated under contract by Captain Cook Cruises on Transperth services on the Swan River in Perth, Western Australia.

== History ==
Princess II was built by Hofland Engineering for the Metropolitan Transport Trust to run the Barrack Street Jetty to South Perth, Western Australia ferry route. It entered service in October 1973 to replace Valhalla.

It was replaced in 1997 by MV Shelley Taylor-Smith.
