= MV Countess II =

Ferry

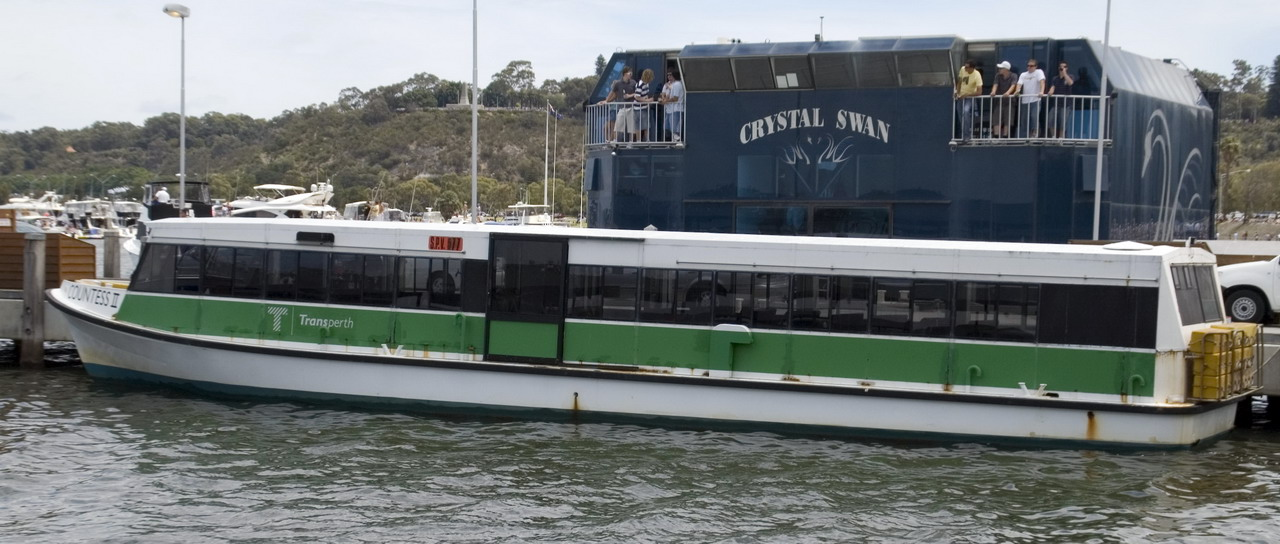
- MV Countess II in November 2006

History
- Name: MV Countess II
- Owner: Public Transport Authority
- Operator: Captain Cook Cruises
- Route: Barrack Street - Mends Street
- Builder: Dillingham Shipyards
- In service: October 1969
- Out of service: 2009

General characteristics
- Length: 20.1 metres
- Beam: 4.3 metres
- Capacity: 100

MV Countess II was a ferry owned by the Public Transport Authority and operated under contract by Captain Cook Cruises on Transperth services on the Swan River in Perth, Western Australia.

== History ==
Countess II was built by Dillingham Shipyards in North Fremantle for the Metropolitan Transport Trust. It entered service in October 1969 to replace Mayflower. It was replaced by MV Phillip Pendal in 2009.
