= MV Tricia =

Swan River ferry in Perth, Western Australia

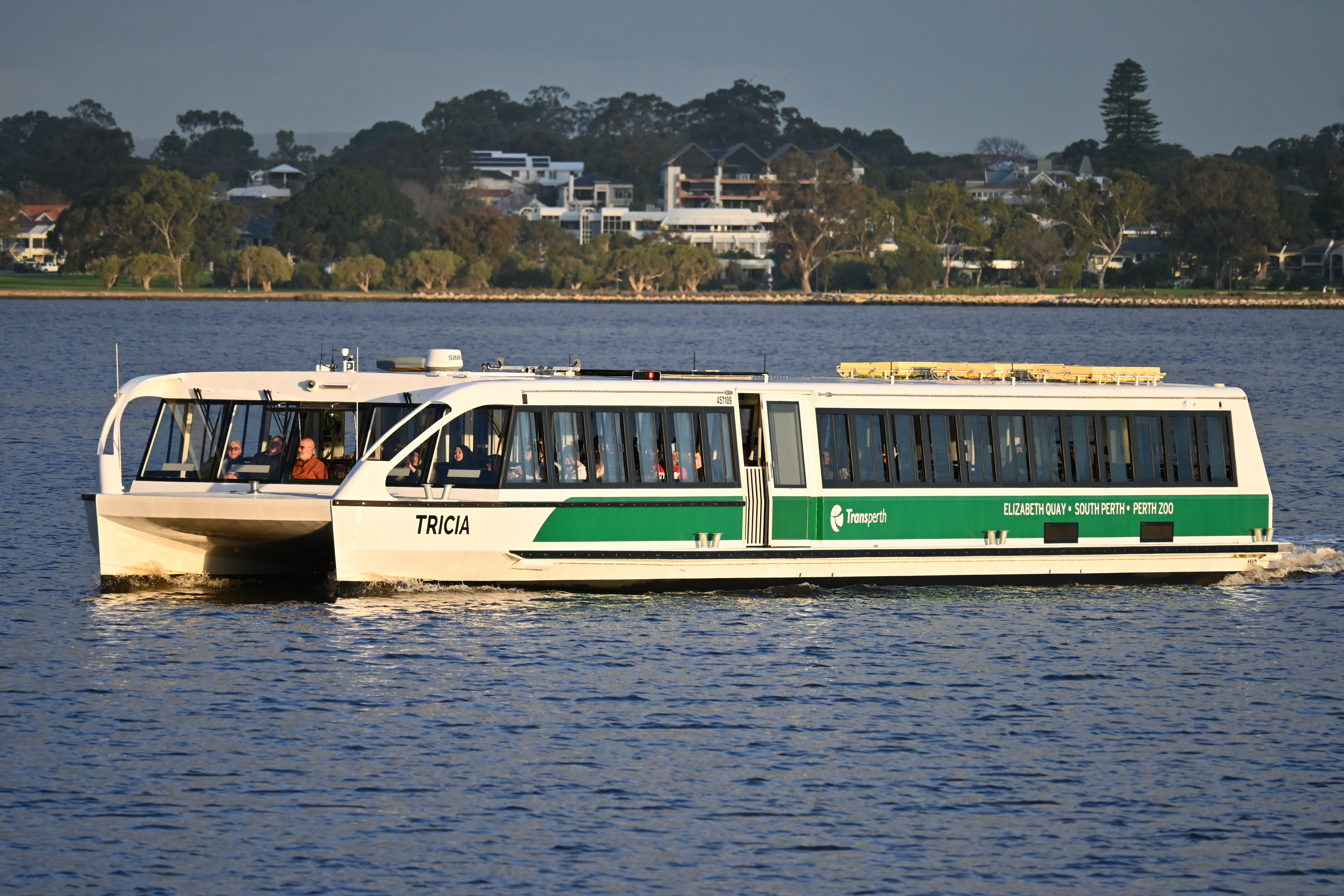
- MV Tricia crossing the Swan River in August 2024

History
- Name: MV Tricia
- Namesake: Tricia, an Asian elephant at Perth Zoo
- Owner: Public Transport Authority
- Operator: Captain Cook Cruises
- Route: Elizabeth Quay - Mends Street
- Builder: Dongara Marine, Port Denison
- In service: 20 December 2019

General characteristics
- Length: 23.7 metres
- Beam: 5.5 metres
- Draught: 1.0 metre
- Decks: 1
- Propulsion: 2 x Cummins QSB6.7
- Speed: 16 knots
- Capacity: 148
- Crew: 2

MV Tricia is a ferry owned by the Public Transport Authority and operated under contract by Captain Cook Cruises on Transperth services on the Swan River in Perth, Western Australia. It was named by public vote after the longest-residing member of Perth Zoo, Tricia the Asian elephant.

== History ==
In November 2017, the Public Transport Authority called for tenders for a new ferry to replace MV Shelley Taylor-Smith. In December 2018, the contract was awarded to Dongara Marine of Port Denison.

The vessel entered service on 20 December 2019, its maiden voyage involving a special trip down the Swan River passing the Swan Bells, Matagarup Bridge and Optus Stadium.
