= MV Phillip Pendal =

Swan River ferry in Perth, Western Australia

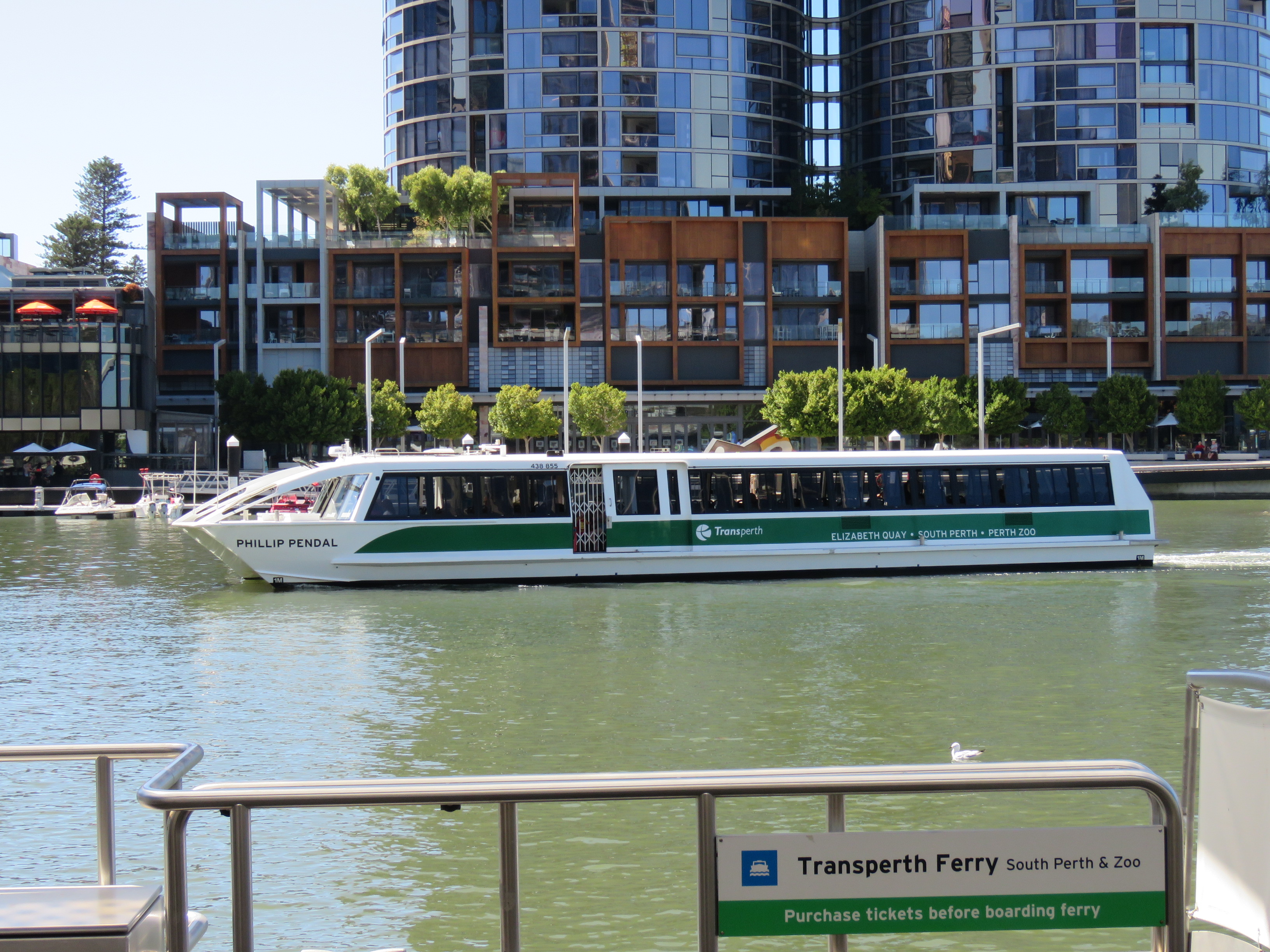
- MV Phillip Pendal at Elizabeth Quay in February 2023

History
- Name: MV Phillip Pendal
- Namesake: Phillip Pendal
- Owner: Public Transport Authority
- Operator: Captain Cook Cruises
- Route: Elizabeth Quay - Mends Street
- Builder: SBF Shipbuilders, Henderson
- In service: 3 May 2009

General characteristics
- Length: 21.7 metres
- Beam: 5.5 metres
- Draught: 0.8 metres
- Propulsion: 2 x Perkins M130C
- Speed: 12 knots
- Capacity: 148
- Crew: 2

MV Phillip Pendal is a ferry owned by the Public Transport Authority and operated under contract by Captain Cook Cruises on Transperth services on the Swan River in Perth, Western Australia.

== History ==
In 2009, SBF Shipbuilders of Henderson was awarded a contract to build a new ferry for Transperth to replace MV Countess II. It was built to the same design as MV Shelley Taylor-Smith. It entered service on 3 May 2009 named after politician Phillip Pendal.
