= PS Duchess =

Former paddle steamer built in Western Australia

Duchess
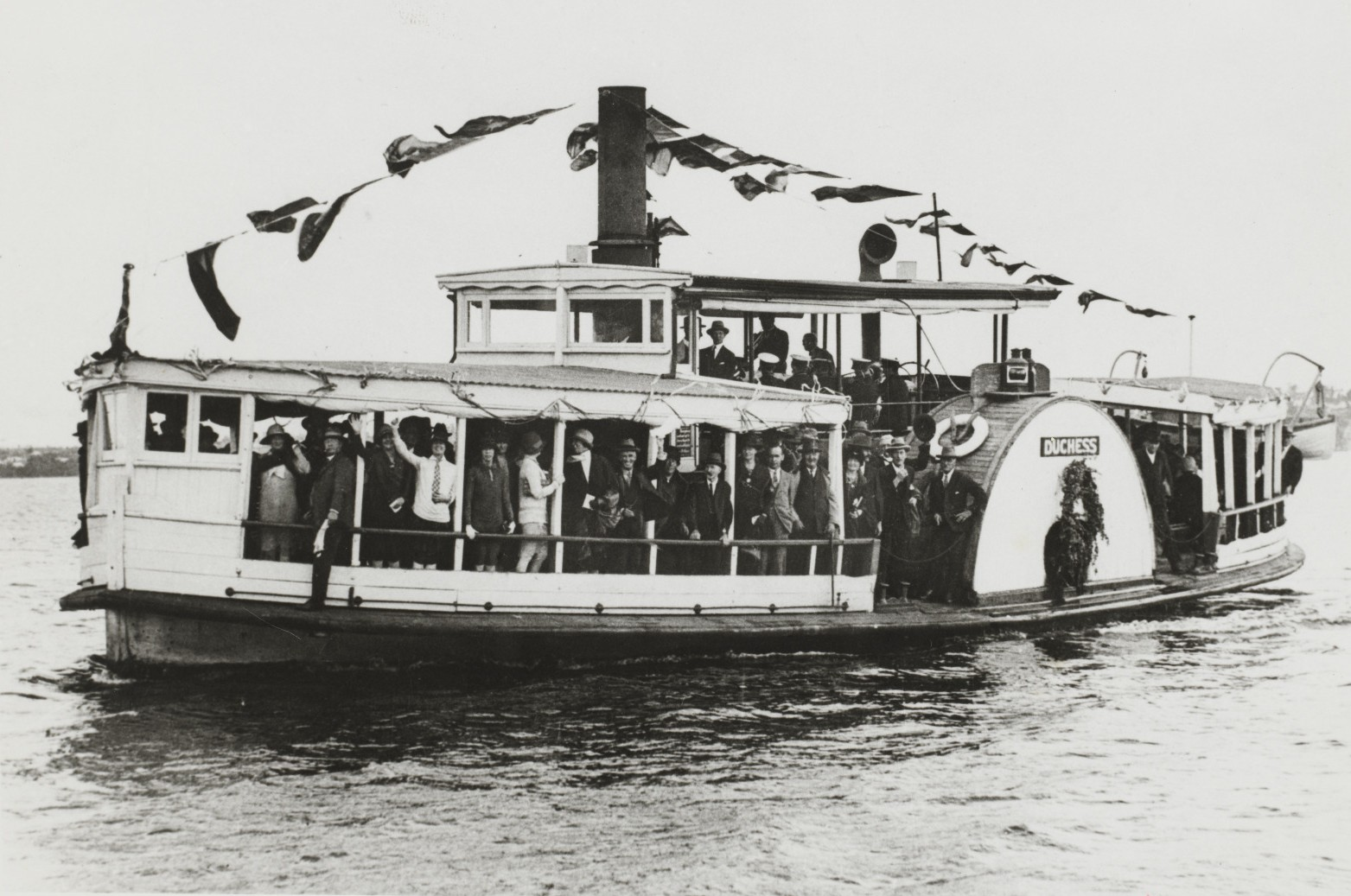
- Duchess on the Swan River on 10 September 1927, on its farewell trip.

History

Australia
- Name: Duchess
- Operator: South Perth Ferry Co. (1898-1912), State Ferries of Western Australia (1912-1927), A. E. Tilley & Co. (1928-1945)
- Port of registry: Perth (1898-1927), Fremantle (1928-1945)
- Route: Swan River (1898-1927), Fremantle Harbour to Rottnest Island (1928-1945)
- Builder: S. & W. Lawrence
- Launched: 1 November 1898
- Christened: 3 November 1898
- Maiden voyage: 1 December 1898
- In service: 11 December 1898
- Out of service: 10 September 1927
- Refit: early 1928 (converted into barge)
- Fate: Scuttled, 1945

General characteristics
- Tonnage: 39 tons
- Length: 21.9 m (71 ft 10 in)
- Beam: 5.5 m (18 ft 1 in)
- Draught: 0.8 m (2 ft 7 in)
- Depth: 1.5 m (4 ft 11 in)
- Installed power: Steam (ferry), petrol (barge)
- Propulsion: Compound diagonal steam engines (ferry), 20 hp petrol engine (barge)
- Capacity: 250 passengers (as built), 400 passengers (licensed)

PS Duchess was a popular paddle steamer ferry built in Western Australia for use on the Swan River. It was later converted into a self-propelled barge for use around Fremantle Harbour, before being scuttled near Rottnest Island; the wreck site is yet to be identified.

Duchess worked for 29 years as a river ferry on the Swan River in South Perth, being the first ferry to convey passengers to Perth Zoo, a service which continues today under Transperth. As a barge it delivered materials for the construction of military fortifications on Rottnest Island.

== History ==
=== Construction and launch ===
Built by shipwrights S. and W. Lawrence of Bazaar Terrace (now in Scarborough) and designed by Mr Ernest Thompson for the South Perth Ferry Company, established in 1897 by S. W. Copley and the late J. Charles, running the service between William Street and Queen Street Jetties in South Perth. Duchess was ordered as a replacement for the company's existing ferries, Queen (later renamed Empress) and Princess, and for a new service to Mends Street Jetty connecting with the under construction Perth Zoo.

Built as a double-ended ferry, Duchess was 21.9 metres (72 ft) in length, with a 5.5-metre (18 ft) beam (7.9 metres or 26 feet over the sponsons), a depth of 1.5 metres (5 ft), and a draught of 0.8 metres (2 ft 6 in), capable of seating 250 passengers, although it was licensed to carry 400. Materials used in its construction included jarrah for the timber framework, and Oregon for the decks and planking, Duchess was powered by compound diagonal steam engines propelling one feathered-type paddle wheel on either side, supplied by Vauxhall Ironworks of London, producing approximately 67 kilowatts (90 hp).

Duchess was partially launched on 31 October 1898, before being properly launched as a test on the morning of 1 November, an official ceremony commemorating her launch was held on 3 November shortly after 3 pm, the vessel christened by the designers wife, Mrs Ernest Thompson, against the rudder. Disappointingly, Duchess was unable to float off the slipway as the water level was too low, the ferry Harley made several attempts to tow Duchess to water before the line snapped. Delays in its entry to service were caused by essential parts not arriving and requiring local fabrication, nevertheless, Duchess was finally trialled on 1 December 1898.

=== Ferry service ===
Duchess officially entered service with the South Perth Ferry Company on 11 December 1898, with its inaugural run to Perth Zoo, being the first ferry to do so.

In the morning of 11 March 1903 on its way for a chartered service to collect members of the Fremantle District Traders' Association for a picnic, Duchess, empty, struck a sunken anchor, near Perth City Baths, this went initially unnoticed by captain E. H. Golding until the engineer reported to him of a hull breach. Golding decided to beach Duchess, and after an investigation removal of the old anchor was attempted, but failed. No injuries were sustained by the crew, the Countess replaced Duchess in the timetable while it was being repaired, before returning to service shortly afterwards.

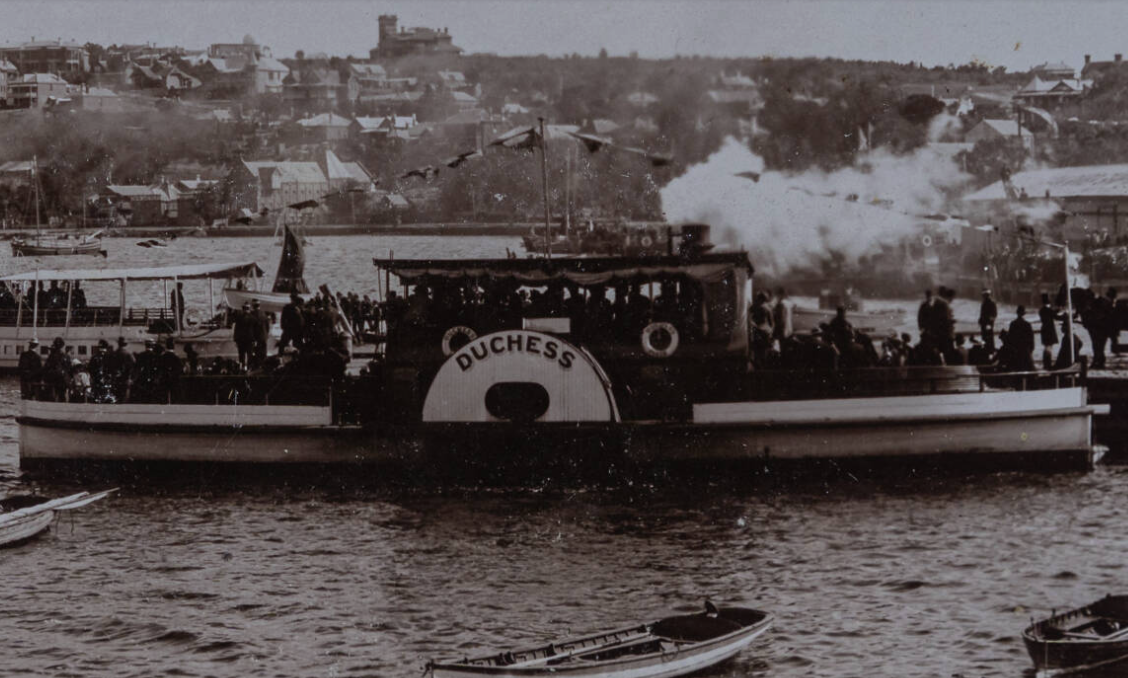
Duchess on the Swan River in 1901

On 12 December 1904, just after 9 pm in Attadale, Duchess, carrying a Hebrew school outing numbering around 250 passengers collided with the Fremantle-bound tugboat, Dunskey which crashed into the Duchess' stern, tearing a large hole in the hull above the waterline. Dunskey quickly reversed and picked up all Duchess' passengers. Three passengers fell into the water, but were rescued, several were injured with lacerations and cuts, and one, Miss H. Cohen was hit by a piece of timber and suffered a fractured skull, but all passengers survived and none died of their injuries.

An investigation of the incident found that Duchess only had 150 lifebuoys despite regulations stipulating that all vessels operating on the Swan River must carry a lifebuoy for each passenger. Dunskey had a dim portside light, its crew contradicted statements from the crew of Duchess, stating they had not heard Duchess giving two blasts of its whistle as required when in close proximity to other vessels. The captain of Dunskey, W. J. Maher, however, testified that he was not aware of local regulations and did not signal through whistling to Duchess as he believed he was on the correct course. Maher held South Australian certification and had only been in-command of the Dunskey for nine months, compared to Golding, who was considered competent, and had five years experience as captain of the Duchess.

J. Game who started working as a deckhand on Duchess succeeded E. H. Golding as captain of the vessel in 1907.

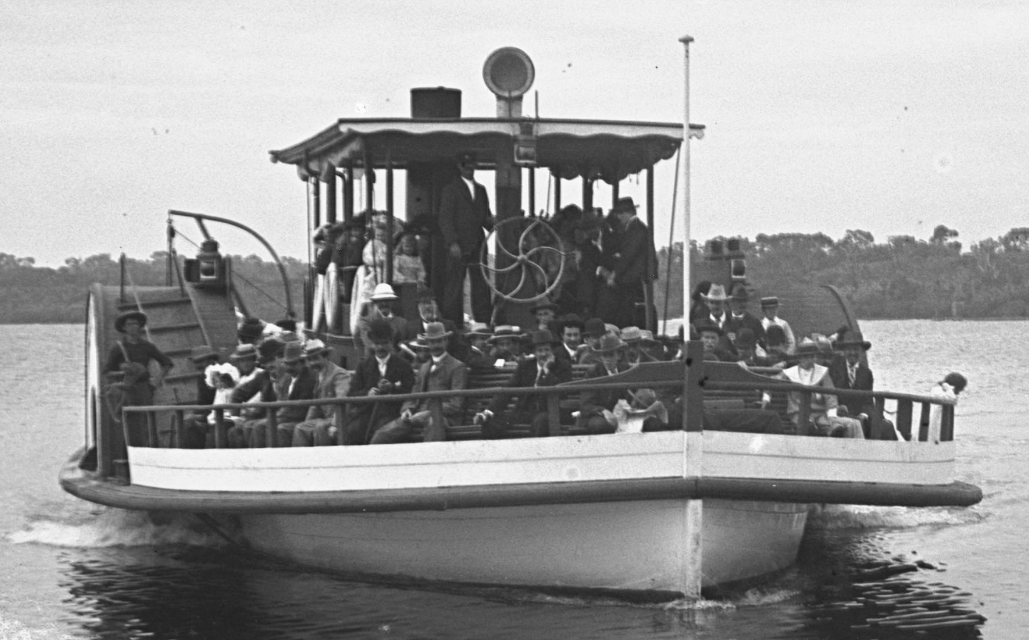
Duchess on the Swan River in 1910

As part of a larger scheme by the Scaddan ministry of increasing government ownership, the South Perth Ferry Company was taken over by the state government, creating State Ferries (also known as Government Ferries) overseen by the Western Australian Government Railways and Tramways Commission. This was announced in March 1912 by Minister for Works William Johnson, with State Ferries formally established in the State Trading Concerns Act of 1916. Thus, the Duchess became government property, though South Perth ferry services continued as normal.

In 1921, Duchess travelled to Fremantle Harbour for the departure of the Duke and Duchess of York aboard the yacht Ophir.

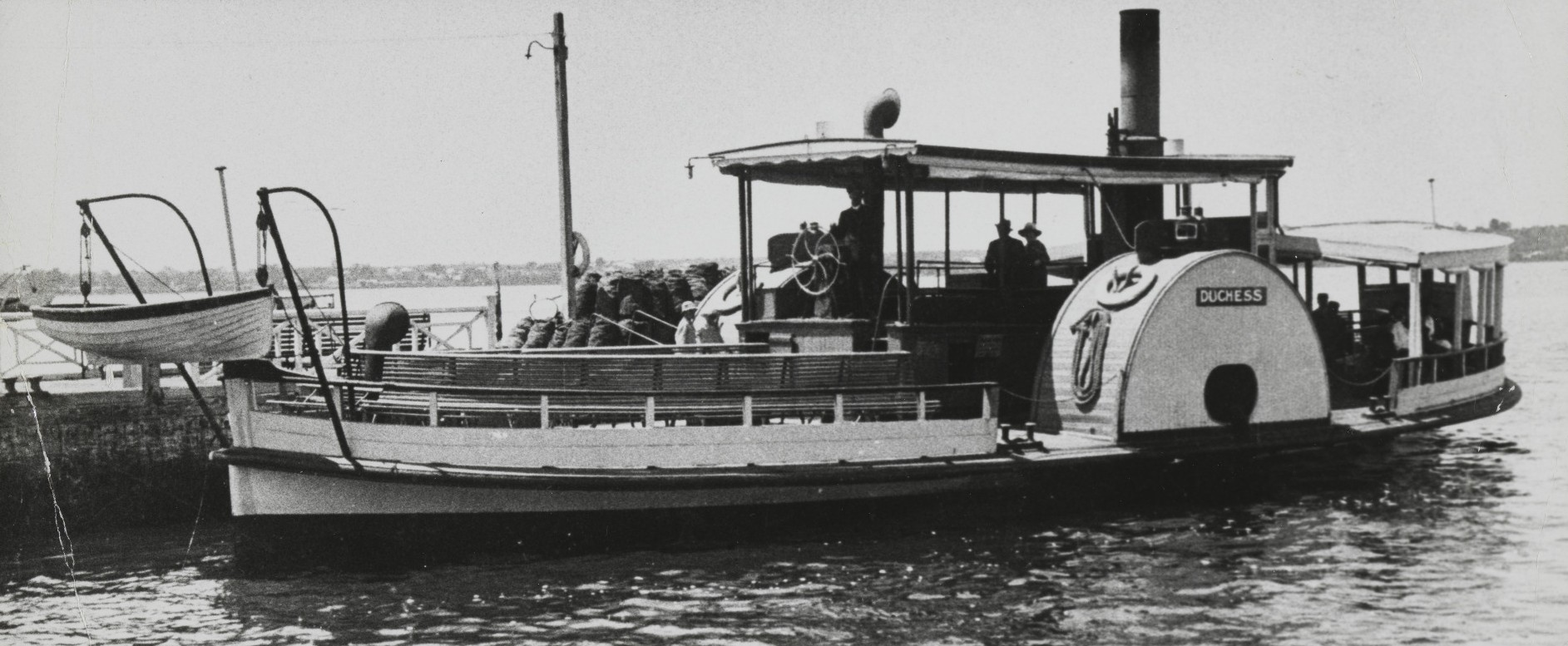
Duchess on the Swan River in 1925

The morning of 14 May 1925 saw Duchess, with about 20 passengers on a regular service between Barrack Street Jetty and Mends Street Jetty through thick fog hit a sandbank, no injuries occurred and no serious damage was caused to the ferry. The police launch Cygnet, along with motor ferries Mayflower, Foam, and Yanda took nearly two hours to finally get the Duchess unstuck.

During the 1926 flood on the Swan River, which resulted in most jetties becoming submerged, one of the Duchess's paddle wheels rode and stuck on the edge of Mends Street Jetty on 20 July, resulting in Duchess' services being suspended for most of the duration of the flood, with motor vessels continuing the service instead.

Duchess, despite its age, remained popular amongst the residents of South Perth, being sometimes referred to as 'the old lady of the Swan', rumours about the Duchess' eminent retirement began in mid-1927. First with a letter to the South Perth Road Board (now the City of South Perth) in June, who decided, should said rumours be true, they should try and acquire one of the Duchess' lifebuoys for display in the council chambers. In late-July it was revealed that the Duchess was to undergo a thorough mechanical survey and inspection to determine its seaworthiness. It failed inspection and in response the South Perth Road Board formed a committee to arrange a farewell tribute to the Duchess.

A farewell trip to Como was arranged by the South Perth Road Board and held on 10 September 1927, the last commercial voyage of Duchess having completed over 320,000 kilometres (200,000 mi), guests included South Perth residents up to 70 years of age, and various dignitaries, a trophy replica of the Duchess' helm was presented to captain Games, who later became manager of State Ferries. The Sunday Times published a poem in tribute to its career, entitled The Duchess by Dryblower Murphy. Captain E. Croker presented a lifebuoy from the Duchess to the South Perth Road Board on-behalf of State Ferries.

After the Duchess was withdrawn from State Ferries service, the new owners of the vessel planned to convert Duchess into a moored floating jazz palais made to look like a pirate ship with an additional deck built as a dance floor. These plans were to have been completed by November 1927, but never eventuated.

=== Barge conversion ===
Duchess was purchased by A. E. Tilley and company (final transaction completed on 5 March 1935), and towed to Victoria Quay on 3 February 1928 to be converted into a self-propelled barge, known as a lighter, where the bulk of its superstructure was removed; the boiler of Duchess, still in good condition was reinstalled on Ball and Sons Agnes. The Duchess had a 20 horsepower petrol engine installed into its hull as it was prepared for use to transport materials between Fremantle and Rottnest Island.

On 7 October 1933, worker F. G. Hopkins fractured his leg when he lost control of the winch aboard the Duchess while docked at East Fremantle Jetty, the winch swung back into his leg, causing the fracture.

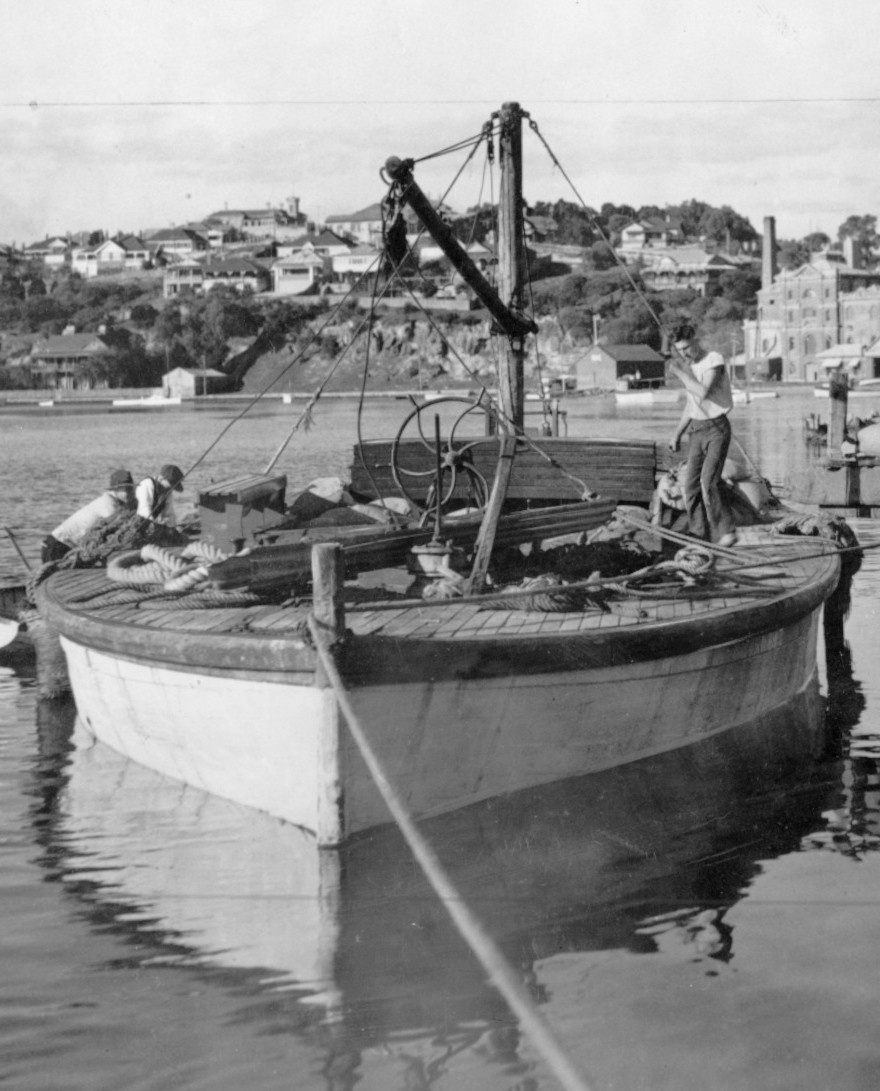
Duchess in Fremantle Harbour being unloaded of salt from Rottnest.

As a barge, Duchess transported materials like salt, bricks, and asphalt to Rottnest. It was one of the lighters, along with Agnes and later Emerald which were contracted for the shipment of material for the construction of military fortifications on Rottnest Island.

A fire at A. E. Tilley and company's boatsheds on 11 October 1936 severely damaged the hull of Duchess which was loaded with ten barrels of petrol, as well as the launch Sunbeam and caused minor damage to Mayflower.

On 10 February 1937, four nautical miles (7.4 km; 4.6 mi) from Fremantle and fully loaded with blue metal bound for Rottnest, the Duchess' engine failed while under tow of the Henley, due to a cyclone which hit Geraldton, strong winds and large waves caused big swells to wash over the Duchess, contributing to its engine failure. The Henley decided to turn back to Fremantle as Duchess began sitting rapidly lower in the water, with three men aboard. The Duchess managed to get into port with help from the launch Dauntless and the three men escaped to safety, but the Duchess sank beside a dolphin close to the North Mole as soon as the Dauntless was untied.

Duchess was raised in April 1937 and towed by the Henley and the Invincible, before sinking again near No. 3 berth at North Wharf during which Duchess turned over and caught the bow of the Invincible, also sinking it. Both the Invincible and Duchess were then towed by Agnes and Mayfield under escort by Dauntless and Lady Forrest, to Tarpot Jetty close to Fremantle railway bridge, where it was beached in shallow water. The Duchess was repaired and returned to service.

During the Second World War the Duchess was used as a garbage barge for American warships, before finally being purposefully scuttled in 1945 near Rottnest Island. The wreck of the Duchess is federally protected under the Underwater Cultural Heritage Act 2018, but has yet to be identified.

The Duchess II, built for State Ferries in 1943, was named after the original Duchess. In October 2015, the state government announced the naming of several new streets after historic ferries at Elizabeth Quay, one of which was named Duchess Way.
