= MV Shelley Taylor-Smith =

Swan River ferry in Perth, Western Australia

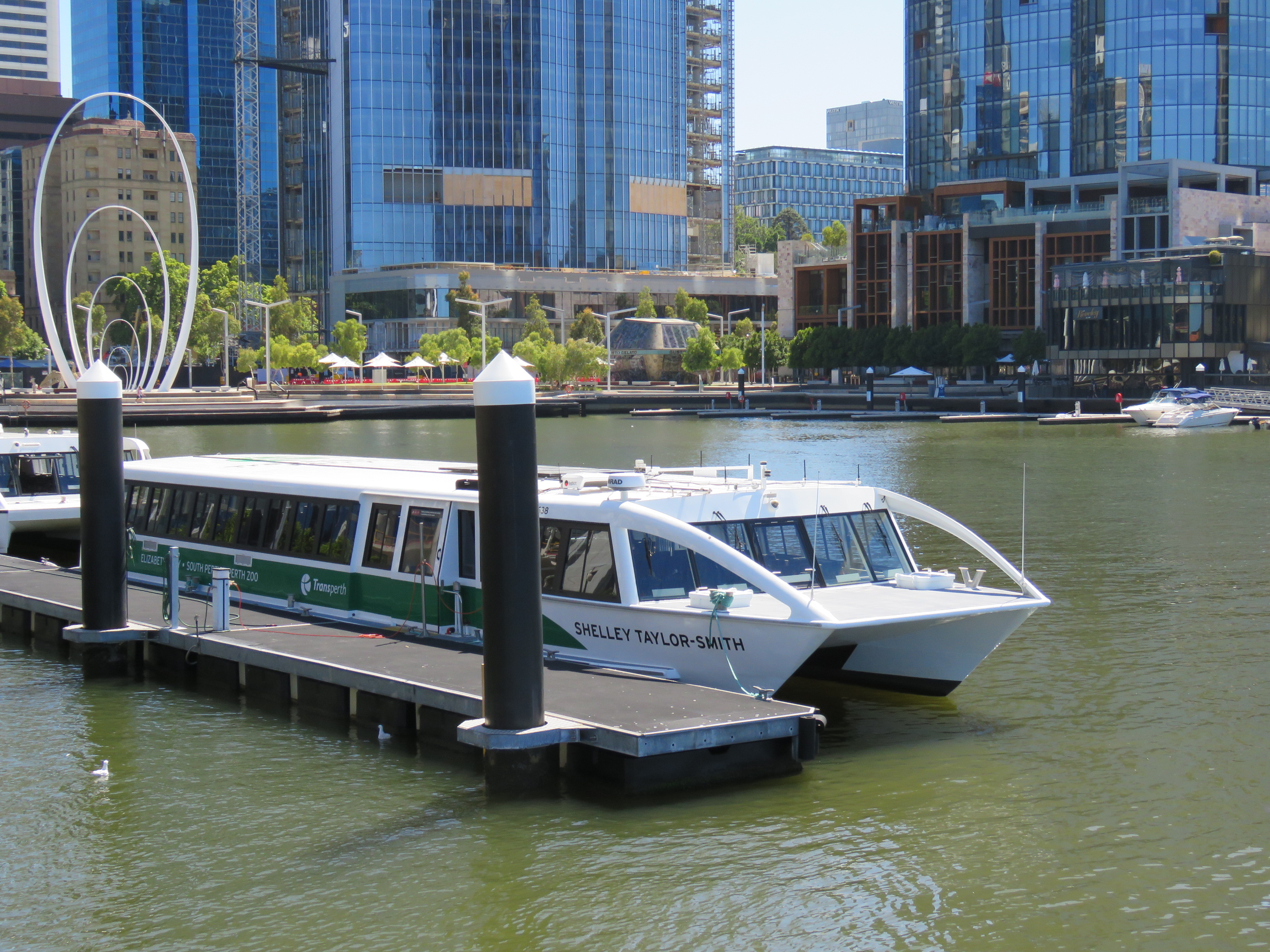
- MV Shelley Taylor-Smith at Elizabeth Quay in December 2021

History
- Name: MV Shelley Taylor-Smith
- Namesake: Shelley Taylor-Smith
- Owner: Public Transport Authority
- Operator: Captain Cook Cruises
- Route: Elizabeth Quay - Mends Street
- Builder: SBF Shipbuilders, South Coogee
- In service: 18 August 1997

General characteristics
- Length: 21.7 metres
- Beam: 5.5 metres
- Draught: 0.8 metres
- Decks: 1
- Propulsion: 2 x Perkins M130C
- Speed: 12 knots
- Capacity: 148
- Crew: 2

MV Shelley Taylor-Smith is a ferry owned by the Public Transport Authority and operated under contract by Captain Cook Cruises on Transperth services on the Swan River in Perth, Western Australia.

== History ==
In February 1997, SBF Shipbuilders of South Coogee was awarded a contract to build a new ferry for Transperth to replace MV Princess II. It entered service on 18 August 1997, and was named after long-distance swimmer Shelley Taylor-Smith.

Since the commissioning of MV Tricia in December 2019, Shelley Taylor-Smith has become the reserve vessel.
