= Shelley Taylor-Smith =

Australian swimmer (born 1961)

Personal information
- Born: 3 August 1961 (age 64) Perth, Western Australia
Medal record
Women's Open water swimming
Representing Australia
FINA World Aquatics Championships
Gold medal – first place	1991 Perth	Open water 25 km
Bronze medal – third place	1994 Rome	Open water 25 km

Shelley Taylor-Smith (born 3 August 1961) is a former Australian long-distance swimmer.

Born in Perth, Western Australia, Taylor-Smith learnt to swim at Mettams Pool in the Perth suburb of Trigg. She suffered from scoliosis, an abnormal curvature of the spine, throughout her school years. The condition required her to wear a back brace, although she was successful in national age group swimming competitions. While on a swimming scholarship to the University of Arkansas in the United States, the heavy training regime caused a lower-body paralysis. During her recovery, her coach noticed that her swimming improved at greater distances, and encouraged her to take up marathon swimming, a sport which would also allow her to avoid potentially back-damaging tumble turns.

Taylor-Smith's first major achievement was breaking the world four-mile record in 1983. Subsequently, she won the Manhattan Island Marathon Swim five times, breaking the world record in 1995 for swimming the 48 km distance in five hours, 45 minutes and 25 seconds. She also won the Australian Marathon Swimming Championships three times, and seven consecutive FINA Marathon World Cups. She won a gold medal in the inaugural open water swimming event at the 1991 World Aquatics Championships in Perth, and a bronze at the 1994 Championships in Rome.

Her autobiography, Dangerous When Wet: The Shelley Taylor-Smith Story (ISBN 1864480750) was published in 1996.

In 1998, Taylor-Smith was diagnosed with chronic fatigue syndrome after prolonged exposure to polluted water and Giardia lamblia infection, and was given six months to live. She nonetheless went on to win her fifth consecutive Manhattan Island marathon, and then retired from swimming.

Taylor-Smith currently lives in Perth, where she works as a motivational speaker for her company, Champion Mindset. In 2025, she launched a community swimming group for women at her old pool, Mettams Pool, the Sea Shells Teabaggers.

In 1997, Transperth named a ferry the MV Shelley Taylor-Smith.

== See also ==
- List of members of the International Swimming Hall of Fame
