= Captain Cook Cruises =

Captain Cook Cruises may refer to:

- Captain Cook Cruises, Australia - cruise operator in New South Wales, Queensland and South Australia
- Captain Cook Cruises Western Australia - ferry operator in Western Australia
