= MV Perth =

Former ferry in Perth, Western Australia

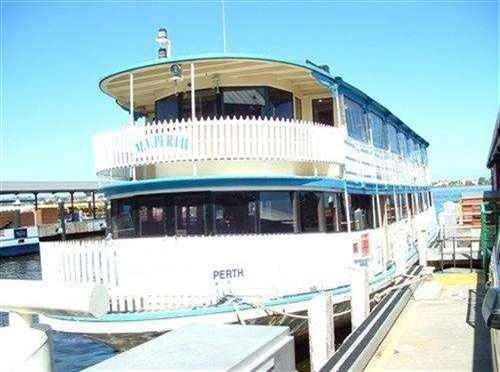
- MV Perth at Barrack Street Jetty in 2009

History

Australia
- Name: MV Perth
- Namesake: Perth
- Builder: AE Brown, Fremantle
- Laid down: 1914
- Maiden voyage: 30 December 1914

General characteristics
- Length: 31.4 metres
- Beam: 6.1 metres
- Decks: 2

MV Perth is a wooden boat that has operated on the Swan River in Perth, Western Australia. Built in Fremantle in 1914, it is one of the oldest wooden boats still afloat in Western Australia.

== History ==
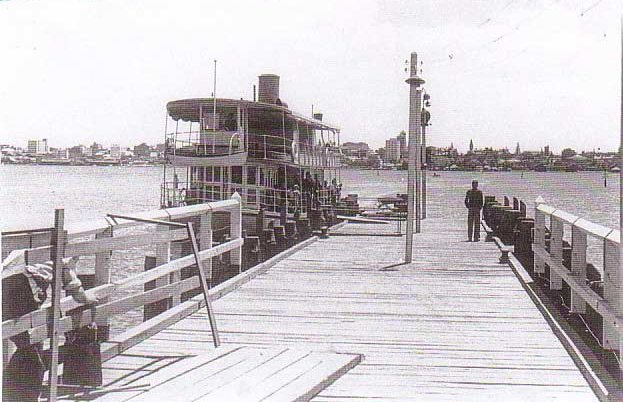
MV Perth at Mends Street Jetty in 1939

In 1914, the keel of SS Perth was laid down by AE Brown, Fremantle. Built out of Oregon pine and jarrah, its steam engine was built in Glasgow by McKie & Baxter. It was a doubled ended vessel with twin steering stations and twin propellers. It completed its maiden voyage from Barrack Street Jetty to Mends Street Jetty on 30 December 1914.

With a decline in patronage following the opening of the Narrows Bridge, it became an excursion vessel. In 1971 it was converted to diesel power with an engine from Kelvin Diesels. The old steam engine was left aboard until 1987, when it was removed and donated to the Western Australian Museum.

It was withdrawn in 1982. After having its superstructure removed, in 1985 a rebuild at Marco's Slipway, Fremantle commenced. It was completed in November 1986 and leased to a private operator.

In 1998, it was modified by Ozco, Fremantle for use as a party boat. White picket railings were added to resemble a paddle steamer. In 2007, it was sold to the WA Steamship Company.
