= Metropolitan Transport Trust =

Former public transport provider in Western Australia

Metropolitan (Perth) Passenger Transport Trust
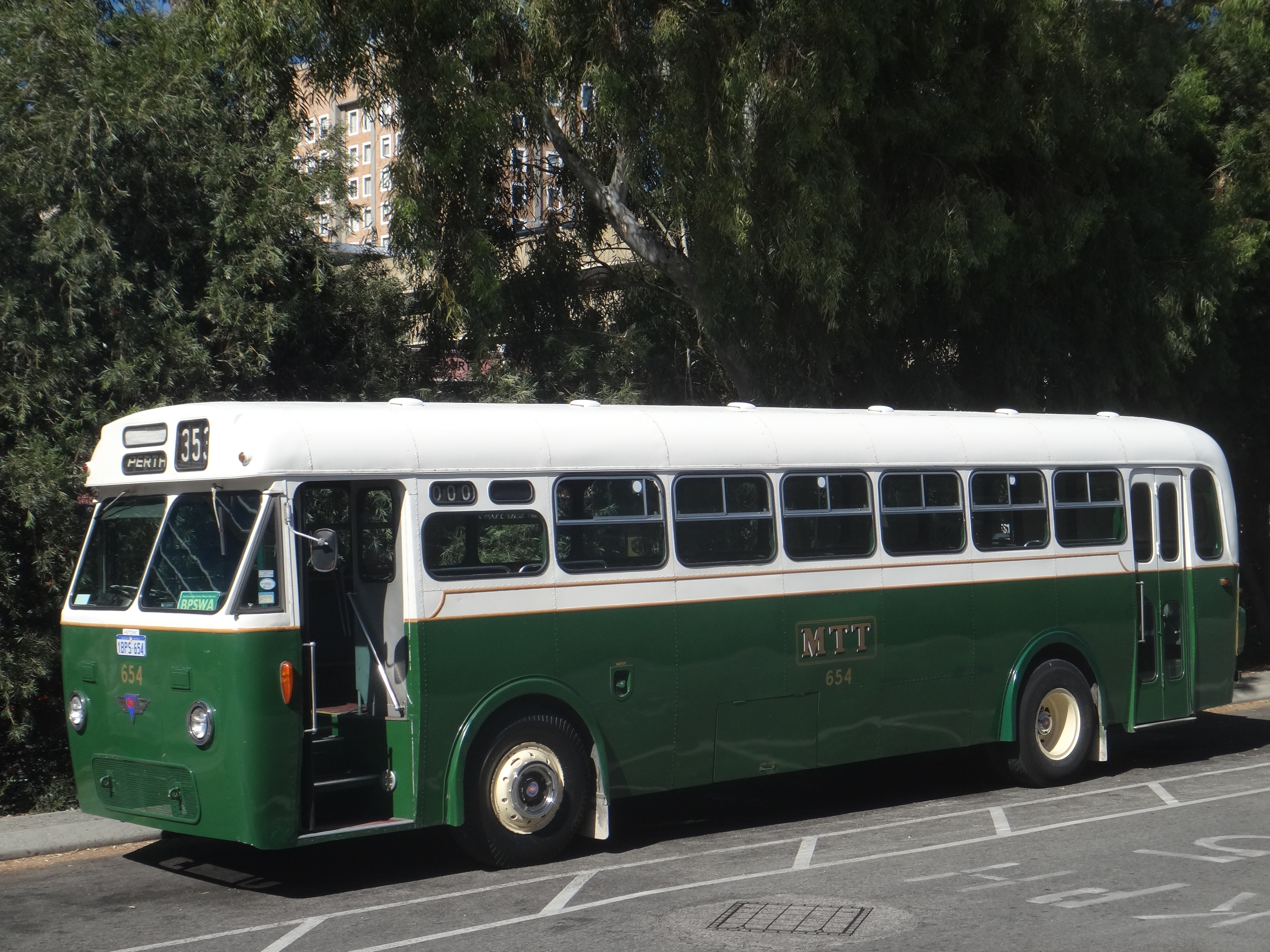
- MTT-operated AEC Regal VI

Overview
- Owner: Government of Western Australia
- Area served: Perth, Western Australia
- Transit type: Bus, ferry, train

Operation
- Began operation: 31 August 1958
- Ended operation: 4 July 1998
- Operator: Westrail (trains)

The Metropolitan (Perth) Passenger Transport Trust was a statutory authority of the Government of Western Australia from 1958 to 2003. From 1958 to the mid-1990s, it operated bus and ferry services within the Perth metropolitan area. From 1974 to 1993, it managed suburban rail services within the Perth metropolitan area as well, contracting the operation of those services to Westrail.

The organisation was formed with the trading name Metropolitan Transport Trust (MTT) on 15 January 1958 with the purpose of consolidating the various private bus companies into one entity. The private bus companies at the time were in a perilous financial state and people believed that Perth would benefit from a single integrated public transport system. Over the following four years, the MTT acquired the bus companies and the government-operated ferries. The MTT opened the first bus stations in Perth during the 1970s, starting with Morley bus station (now Galleria bus station) in August 1972 and Wellington Street bus station in March 1973.

In March 1974, the MTT took over the management of Perth's suburban rail system from the Western Australian Government Railways (WAGR) and contracted the operation of the suburban rail system back to WAGR, making this the first time that all public transport in Perth has been managed by one organisation. The MTT adopted Transperth as its trading name on 31 August 1986 in a bid to create a unified brand for the buses, ferries and trains. In the late 1980s and early 1990s, the existing three train lines were electrified and the Joondalup line was constructed.

The process for privatising the operation of the Transperth system began in 1993. Responsibility for managing the system was transferred to the Department of Transport. The Transperth brand was also transferred to the Department of Transport, with the brand to be used by all the companies which were to operate services under contract. The MTT adopted the trading name MetroBus on 14 February 1995. The operation of the ferries was transferred to Captain Cook Cruises in February 1995. It was initially planned that MetroBus would compete with the private sector for contracts, and it was successful in bidding for the Joondalup North, Armadale South and Perth CATs contracts in 1995 and 1996 whilst several other contracts were awarded to the private sector. The government later announced that it would withdraw MetroBus from operating and it would tender out the remaining contract areas. MetroBus ceased operating bus services on 4 July 1998 and it was abolished on 30 June 2003 upon the formation of the Public Transport Authority.

== History ==
=== Acquisitions ===
Investment in buses by the private bus companies in Perth fell during and after World War II, leading the buses to become run-down. Car ownership became more common as well, and these factors caused bus patronage to fall following 1950. The private bus companies were in a perilous financial state and people believed that Perth would benefit from a single integrated public transport system.

In 1957, the Parliament of Western Australia passed the Metropolitan (Perth) Passenger Transport Trust Act 1957. The act was assented on 10 December that year and on 15 January 1958, the Metropolitan (Perth) Passenger Transport Trust was formed under the trading name Metropolitan Transport Trust, or MTT for short. The act called for the MTT "to provide, maintain, protect and manage … efficient passenger transport facilities."

The MTT commenced operations on 31 August 1958. The first two private operators the MTT acquired were Metro Buses and Beam Transport. Later in 1958, Carlisle Bus Service, Kalamunda Bus Service and United Buses were acquired. In early 1959, Emu Buses was acquired. No further acquisitions were in the 1959–60 financial year, but negotiations commenced for the acquisition of the WA Government Tramways and Ferries, the Fremantle Municipal Transport Board, the Riverton Bus Service, and the Coogee-Spearwood Bus Company. Concession fares for pensioners and ex-service people were introduced. The following financial year, the MTT acquired the aforementioned agencies and companies. By this point, the MTT owned 26 different engine models which resulted in high maintenance and repair costs, so the MTT adopted a fleet standardisation policy.

The MTT acquired the North Beach Bus Company in October 1961 and in April 1962, it acquired the Scarborough Bus Service. The MTT took over the operation of the Perth to Wanneroo bus service from Metro Tours in June 1964. Bus-ferry transfers were introduced in 1964–65, which allowed transfers between the two modes with no additional cost to the passenger. This resulted in an increase in patronage on the ferry services from the Barrack Street Jetty to the Mends Street Jetty in South Perth. Diesel buses started to take over the trolleybus routes as well that financial year. On 30 August 1969, the last trolleybuses ran, making Perth the last city in Australia where trolleybuses operated.

In 1972–73, the first bus stations opened in Perth. A bus station in Morley opened in August 1972 and Wellington Street bus station opened in March 1973. These bus stations were part of a plan to build a ring of bus stations in suburban locations around Perth near shopping centres, operate feeder buses to the bus stations, where passengers could then transfer to mainline buses to the Perth central business district (CBD). Express buses would also operate between suburban bus stations and the Perth CBD during peak periods. More of these bus stations would open over the following years, including Karrinyup in September 1974, Rockingham in November 1974, Kwinana in 1975–76, Booragoon in September 1976, Innaloo in January 1977, and Mirrabooka in September 1979.

In September 1973, the MTT introduced the City Clipper services, which were free bus routes which ran within the Perth CBD and are predecessors to the Perth Central Area Transit (CAT) routes.

=== Suburban trains ===
In 1973–74, the Parliament of Western Australia passed the Metropolitan (Perth) Passenger Transport Trust Act Amendment Act 1973 and the Government Railways Act Amendment Act 1973 making amendments to the Metropolitan (Perth) Passenger Transport Trust Act 1957 and the Government Railways Act 1904 respectively,. to enable the MTT to gain the responsibility of the provision of suburban train services, which had up to that point been managed and operated by the Western Australian Government Railways (WAGR), later known as Westrail. The amendments meant that WAGR remained the owner of the suburban rail infrastructure and rolling stock and would operate the services on behalf of the MTT. The MTT would be responsible for service planning. These changes were at the request of Westrail, which was focused on freight operations at the time; the MTT reluctantly accepted. The changes went into effect in March 1974, and in July 1974, the MTT assumed financial responsibility for suburban train operations.

In August 1974, a common fare system was introduced to make bus-train transfers easier. The new fare system meant many patrons got cheaper travel, in particular those who travelled long distances, and it reduced operating costs and helped to speed up services. Free return journeys within two hours were also facilitated by the new system. The common fare system was the first in Australia. Smoking was banned on all MTT buses in May 1975, making the MTT Australia's first public transport operator to do so.

The Fremantle line was closed on 1 September 1979 and replaced with bus services. 74 new buses were introduced that year, including eighteen articulated buses to replace the Fremantle line. In June 1980, Kelmscott railway station was redeveloped to incorporate a bus station on the railway platform for convenient transfers. Rockingham bus station was relocated to a new site in May 1981, Warwick bus station opened in March 1982, and Kalamunda bus station opened in September 1982. Fare zone boundaries were revised in 1981–82 and the MultiRider ticketing system was introduced. The Fremantle line reopened on 29 July 1983.

On 31 August 1986, the MTT adopted Transperth as its new trading name. This included a new logo and new livery for its trains, buses and ferries. The government commenced the Northern Suburbs Rapid Transit Study in November 1987 to identify the best form of public transport to serve Perth's rapidly growing northern suburbs. This study concluded that the Northern Suburbs Transit System should be built as a railway down the median strip of the Mitchell Freeway. In February 1988, the government approved the electrification of the Armadale, Fremantle, and Midland lines. Construction on the electrification project commenced in 1988–89. Construction on the Perth City Busport (now called Elizabeth Quay bus station) began in July 1988. As part of the busport, a 7-kilometre (4.3 mi) busway was constructed down the median of the Kwinana Freeway between the busport and Canning Bridge. The busway opened in November 1989.

The Free Transit Zone within the Perth CBD, which is still in use today, was introduced in September 1989. McIver railway station in the Perth CBD opened on 1 September 1989. Cannington railway station was rebuilt as a bus-train interchange. Work began on the Northern Suburbs Transit System in November 1989. North Fremantle railway station was rebuilt in 1990–91 and reopened on 28 July 1991; and Leighton railway station was closed. The electrification of the Armadale line was turned on in August 1990 and in July 1991 for the Fremantle and Midland lines. Patronage on all train lines increased above forecast levels following the electrification. The Transperth A-series electrical multiple unit trains were introduced as well. The Perth City Busport officially opened in November 1991. The Kwinana Freeway busway was extended by 2 kilometres (1.2 mi) to Mount Henry Bridge.

A new fare structure was introduced in July 1992. The Northern Suburbs Transit System fully opened in March 1993 as the Joondalup line. Bus routes in the northern suburbs were reorganised so that they fed into the Joondalup line. In June 1994, the new Morley bus station (now Galleria bus station) opened.

=== Privatisation ===
The government approved a plan called A More Responsive and Integrated Public Transport Service for Perth in September 1993. This plan called for a restructuring of the planning and operation of the Transperth system. The operation of bus, train and ferry services was to be sold at an invitation to tender and the MTT was to be corporatized to compete with the private sector to win contracts for the operation of Transperth services. The management of the Transperth system was transferred to the Department of Transport. From 1 July 1994, the Department of Transport was responsible for telephone and passenger information services. The Transperth brand was also transferred to the Department of Transport, with the brand to be used by all the companies which were to operate services under contract. As such, the MTT adopted the trading name MetroBus on 14 February 1995.

The management of the suburban train services was transferred back to Westrail in December 1994. In February 1995, the operation of the ferries was transferred to Captain Cook Cruises. The bus system was divided into 15 contract areas and nine were put to tender in 1995 and 1996. In July 1995, MetroBus was named the preferred tenderer for the operation of buses in the Joondalup North and Armadale South contract areas. MetroBus and the Department of Transport signed a five-year contract for those areas in November 1995. MetroBus bid for the Midland contract area in 1995, but it was announced that it was unsuccessful in doing so in September 1995, and so from January 1996, the Midland contract area was operated by Swan Transit. It was announced in May 1996 that MetroBus was successful in bidding for the operation of the new Perth CAT services though. CAT operations by MetroBus commenced in August 1996, replacing the City Clipper services. MetroBus was not successful in any of its other bids during the first stage of privatisation, and so the Rockingham, Southern River, Canning, Marmion, and Wanneroo contract areas were taken over by various private operators in September 1996. As of 1995–96, Transperth's cost per vehicle kilometre had been reduced by approximately 21 percent since September 1993.

MetroBus's bus fleet was sold to the Department of Transport in June 1996 and MetroBus would lease the buses it would need from the department. On 5 October 1997, the government announced that it would withdraw MetroBus from operating any contract areas by 4 July 1998 and it would tender out the remaining contract areas. The Joondalup North, Armadale South and Kalamunda contract areas were awarded to private operators by December 1997 and MetroBus ceased operating in those areas in January 1998. The remaining contract areas–Morley, Claremont/Belmont, Fremantle, Cockburn, and the CAT system–were awarded to private operators in April 1998, who took over from MetroBus on 4 July 1998, thus marking the end of MetroBus as a Transperth bus operator.

MetroBus continued past 4 July 1998 with the purpose of disposal of assets and ensuring that any remaining staff was given training and experience to allow them to find employment elsewhere. The Metropolitan (Perth) Passenger Transport Trust Act 1957 was repealed by the Public Transport Authority Act 2003, and so MetroBus was abolished on 30 June 2003 and succeeded by the Public Transport Authority. The remaining funds held by MetroBus were transferred to the Department of Treasury and the remaining debts owed to MetroBus were transferred to the Department for Planning and Infrastructure.

== Board ==
The MTT board initially consisted of four members: a chairman, a member, a part-time member, and a secretary. The changes in March 1974 which made the MTT the manager of suburban trains also expanded the MTT board to five members, with the new spot being for a representative from WAGR. The members of the MTT board are appointed by the governor of Western Australia upon nomination by the relevant minister (usually the minister for transport) for a term of up to five years. Notable members have been Peter Newman (1988–1993), Diana Warnock (1988–1991) and Reece Waldock.

== Bus fleet ==
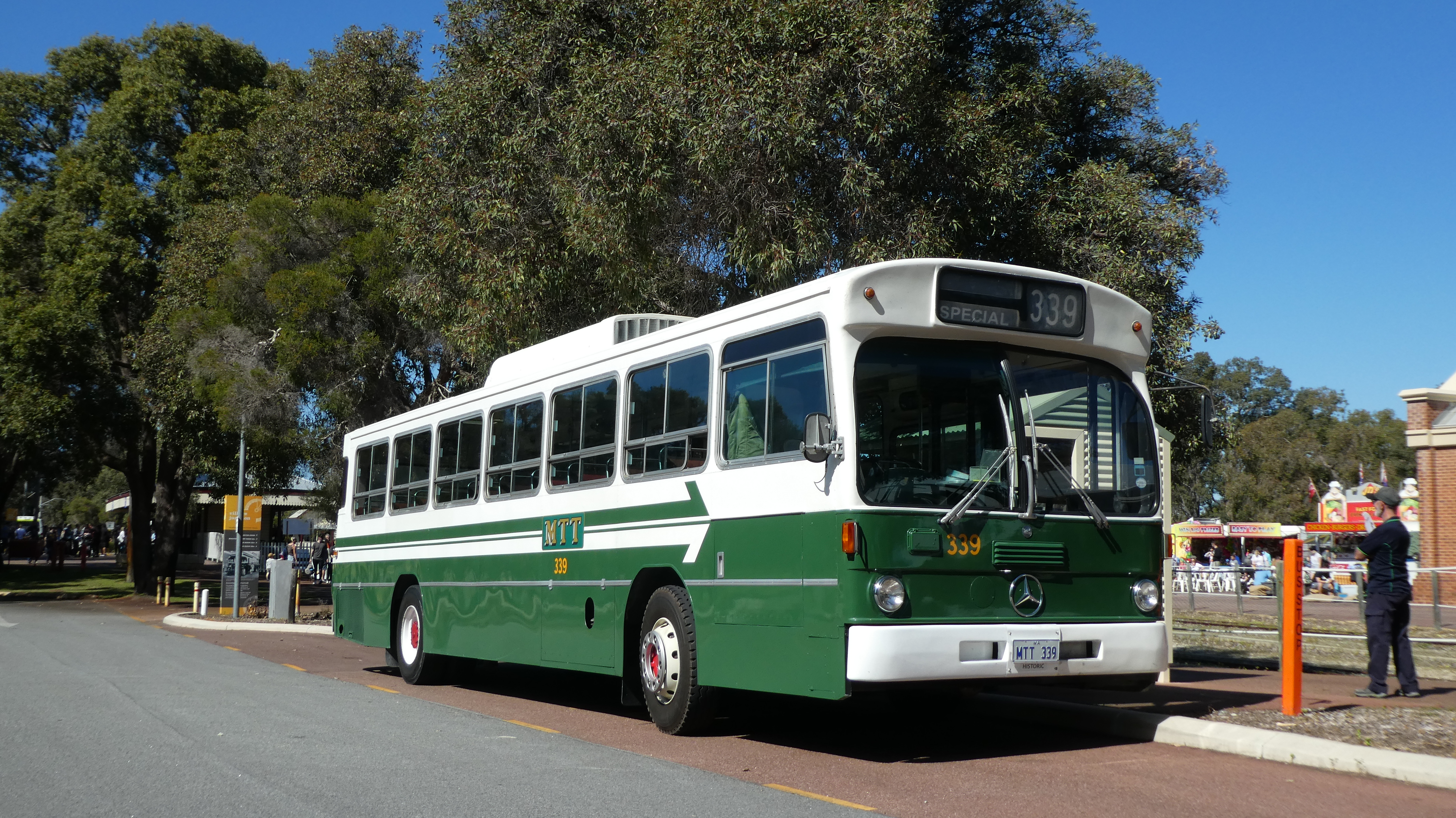
MTT-operated Mercedes-Benz O305

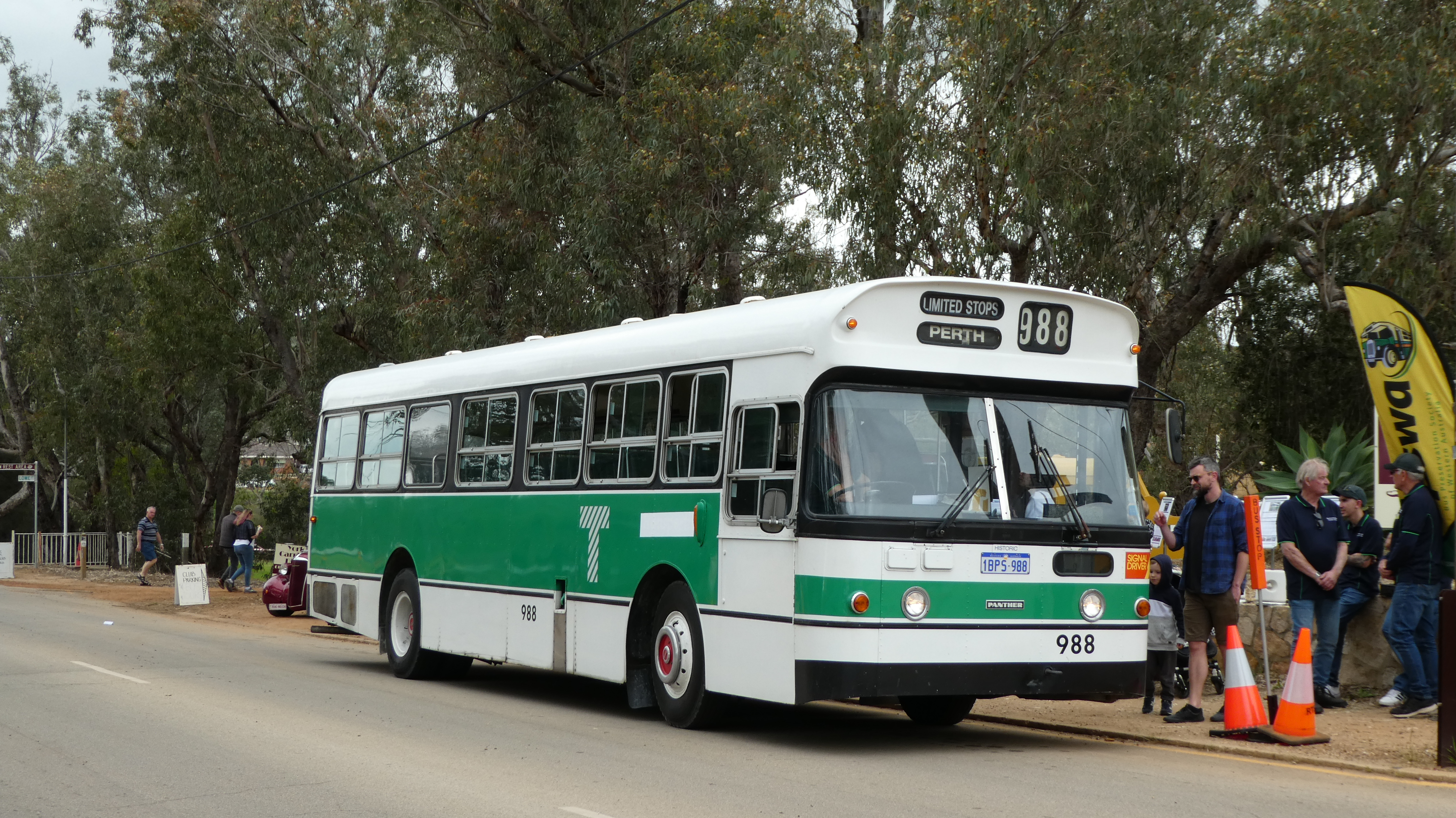
Transperth-operated Leyland Panther

MTT bus fleet
Financial year (ending 30 June)	Number of buses
1958–59	211
1959–60	211
1960–61	472
1961–62	561
1962–63	579
1963–64	573
1964–65	590
1965–66	626
1966–67	652
1967–68	681
1968–69	688
1969–70	688
1970–71	729
1971–72	756
1972–73	785
1973–74	776
1974–75	788
1975–76	814
1976–77	822
1977–78	832
1978–79	851
1979–80	883
1980–81	886
1981–82	899
1982–83	904
1983–84	
1984–85	
1985–86	
1986–87	912
1987–88	899
1988–89	898
1989–90	906
1990–91	917
1991–92	923
1992–93	901
1993–94	851
1994–95	851
1995–96	812
1996–97	460
1997–98	375
1998–99	0
