= Perth Parking Levy =

The Perth Parking Levy is an annual fee paid by the owners of non-residential parking bays within the Perth Parking Management Area, which covers most of the City of Perth and a small part of the City of Vincent in Western Australia. The fees are used to fund public transport and active transport within the Perth Parking Management Area, including funding the Perth Central Area Transit (CAT) buses and the free transit zone.

== History ==
The proposed Perth Parking Levy was endorsed by state cabinet in 1996. The Perth Parking Management Act was introduced to the Parliament of Western Australia in 1999. The goal of the levy was to reduce congestion and pollution within the Perth central business district (CBD). The levy was criticised by the Chamber of Commerce and Industry of Western Australia and the Perth Property Council though, who claimed that the levy would prevent investment in the city and stop people from visiting the CBD. Despite that, the Perth Parking Management Act was passed by Parliament in 1999, and it came into operation on 19 July 1999.

In 2009, the levy on motorcycle bays was eliminated as motorcycles could help with reducing congestion.

During the COVID-19 pandemic, there were calls for the Perth Parking Levy to be scrapped due to the pandemic's impact on CBD businesses. Perth Lord Mayor Basil Zempilas has been critical of increases in the Perth Parking Levy, claiming that it negatively impacts small businesses and retailers and disincentivises people from visiting the Perth central business district. In July 2021, he requested that the auditor general examine the state government's management of the Perth Parking Levy.

On 14 February 2023, the state government announced plans to change the Perth Parking Management Act to allow the Perth Parking Levy to fund not just transport projects, but "any initiative or project that delivers positive social and economic outcomes and that activate the Perth central area". Other changes included allowing the levy to fund projects outside the Perth Parking Management Area and giving greater flexibility for the levy to be waived under extraordinary circumstances. Transport Minister Rita Saffioti gave the example of the Causeway Cycling and Pedestrian Bridge, which was only able to receive $24 million from the Perth Parking Levy. Perth Lord Mayor Basil Zempilas criticised the changes, saying that the city was "blindsided" and treated with "contempt".

Two days later, the auditor general released its report into the Perth Parking Levy, saying that the state government has failed to adequately consult the City of Perth on how to spend the money in the levy's account as required under the legislation, which has resulted in the account balance ballooning from $54 million to $190 million over the previous five years. The report also found that in October 2021, the Transport Minister had given conditional approval for $600,000 from the levy to be spent on a swimming pool at the WACA Ground subject to the Perth Parking Management Act being changed.

The Perth Parking Management Bill was introduced to the Parliament of Western Australia in August 2023. It passed both houses of Parliament, and was given the royal assent on 7 March 2024.

== Perth Parking Management Area ==
The boundary of the Perth Parking Management Area is the Swan River to the south and east, Summers Street, Lord Street, Parry Street, Lindsay Street and Newcastle Street to the north, Thomas Street, Winthrop Avenue and Park Avenue to the west. There is also a small area to the east in Nedlands and Crawley, which covers the route of the Purple CAT and does not include any parking bays. This area was added to the Perth Parking Management Area when the Purple CAT route commenced to get around the rule that the Perth Parking Levy must only fund projects within the Perth Parking Management Area. This covers most of the City of Perth and a small part of the City of Vincent.

== Uses ==
- Perth Central Area Transit buses
- Free transit zone
- Extensions and improvements to cycle and pedestrian paths
- Road works to improve bus efficiency
- Contribution to the Perth City Deal

== Administration ==
The Perth Parking Levy is administrated by the Department of Transport. RevenueWA collects the revenue and manages the licensing system for the Department of Transport.

== Rates ==
As of 2024, the fees per annum are $1,278.20 for each non-residential parking bay, $1,223.20 for each long stay public parking bay, $1,124.60 for each short stay public parking bay and $1,124.60 for each on-street parking bay. There are no fees for motorcycle bays. The levy is only paid for properties which have six or more parking bays, although owners of properties with five or fewer parking bays must still obtain a parking licence.
