= Elizabeth Quay Jetty =

Jetty on Swan River in Perth, Western Australia

Coordinates: 31°57′29″S 115°51′22″E

The Elizabeth Quay Jetty is located at the western side of Elizabeth Quay inlet on the Swan River in Perth, Western Australia.

== Transperth services ==
Elizabeth Quay Jetty
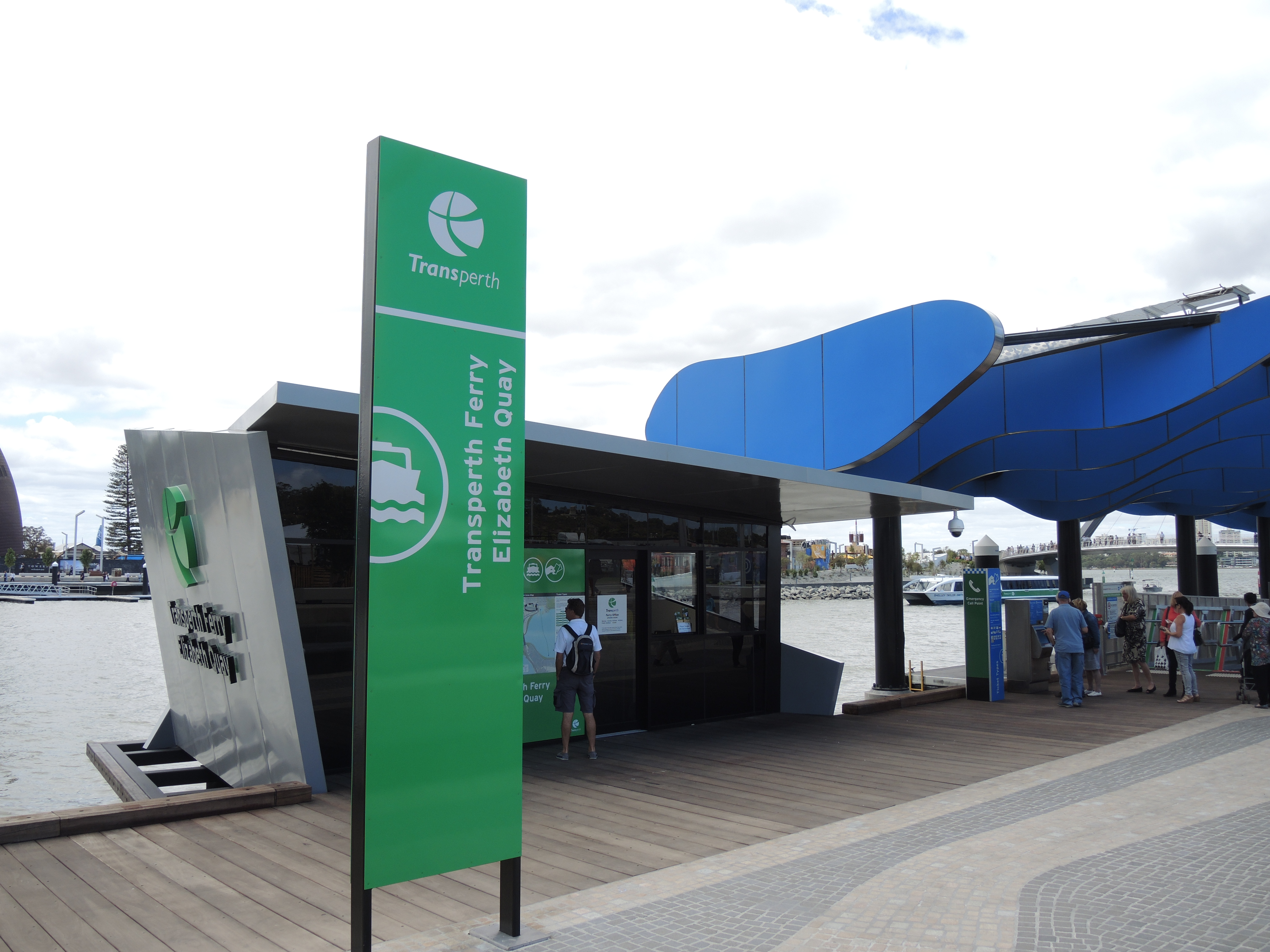
- Transperth Ferry office at Elizabeth Quay Jetty

General information
- Location: Elizabeth Quay; Australia
- Operator: Transperth

Other information
- Fare zone: 1

History
- Opened: January 2016
Location

Transperth operates ferries between Elizabeth Quay and Mends Street Jetty in South Perth, with Elizabeth Quay Jetty replacing Barrack Street Jetty on this service.

Preceding station	Transperth ferries	Following station
Terminus	99997	Mends Street Jetty

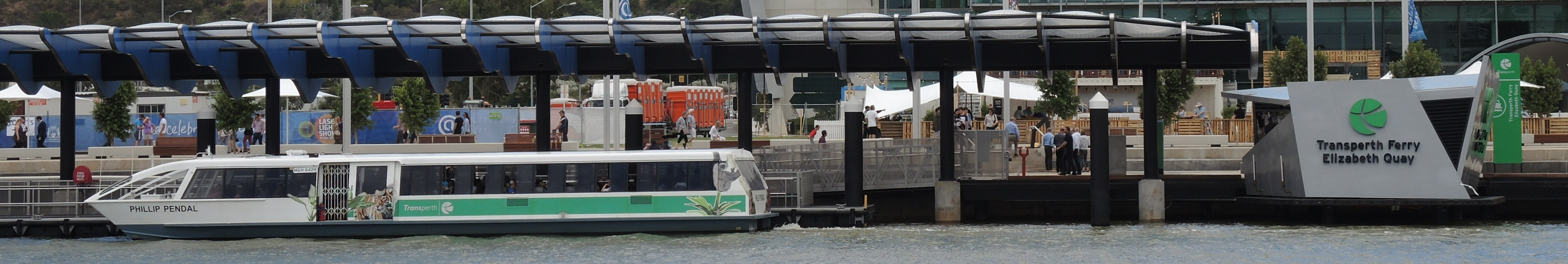
Transperth ferry Phillip Pendal at Elizabeth Quay Jetty
