= Captain Cook Cruises (Western Australia) =

Cruise and ferry company in Australia

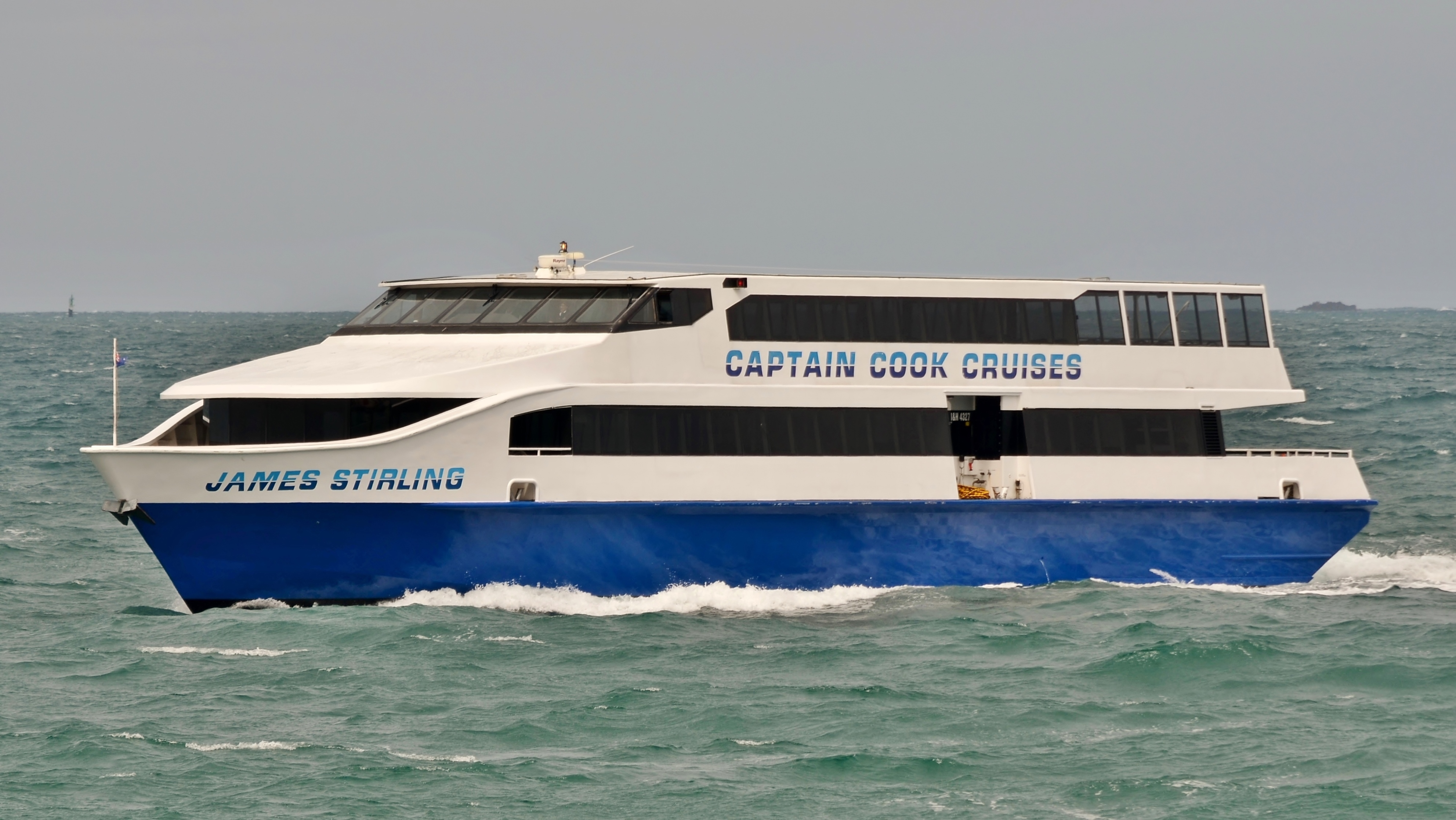
- James Stirling in Fremantle Harbour
- Founded: 1980
- Founder: Boat Torque Cruises
- Headquarters: Perth
- Area served: Fremantle Harbour; Rottnest Island; Swan River
- Services: Cruise and ferry operator
- Parent: SeaLink Travel Group
- Website: captaincookcruises.com.au

Captain Cook Cruises is a cruise and ferry operator on the Swan River, Perth.

== History ==
Captain Cook Cruises was founded in 1980 by Rottnest Island ferry operator Boat Torque Cruises. In July 1987 the business was sold to Tony Baker and John Goodbody with the MV Captain Cook and the MV Swan Explorer. In May 1990 the Swan River Scenic Cruises business was purchased with the MV Jolly Jumbuck which was rebuilt and renamed the MV Swan Princess.

From October 1992 until September 1997, the MV Perth was leased from Transperth. In October 1995 the MV James Stirling was launched. In September 2002 the upstream operation of Boat Torque Cruises was purchased with three vessels: MV Lady De Vine, MV River Bells and MV River Lady.

In February 1995 Captain Cook Cruises successfully tendered to operate Transperth's ferry services between Barrack Street (Perth CBD) and Mends Street (South Perth foreshore), a service it still operates today, with Elizabeth Quay replacing Barrack Street in January 2016.

In February 2016 the business was purchased by SeaLink Travel Group. On 5 November 2017, a service commenced from Fremantle Harbour to Rottnest Island.
