= Barrack Street Jetty =

Jetty in Perth, Western Australia

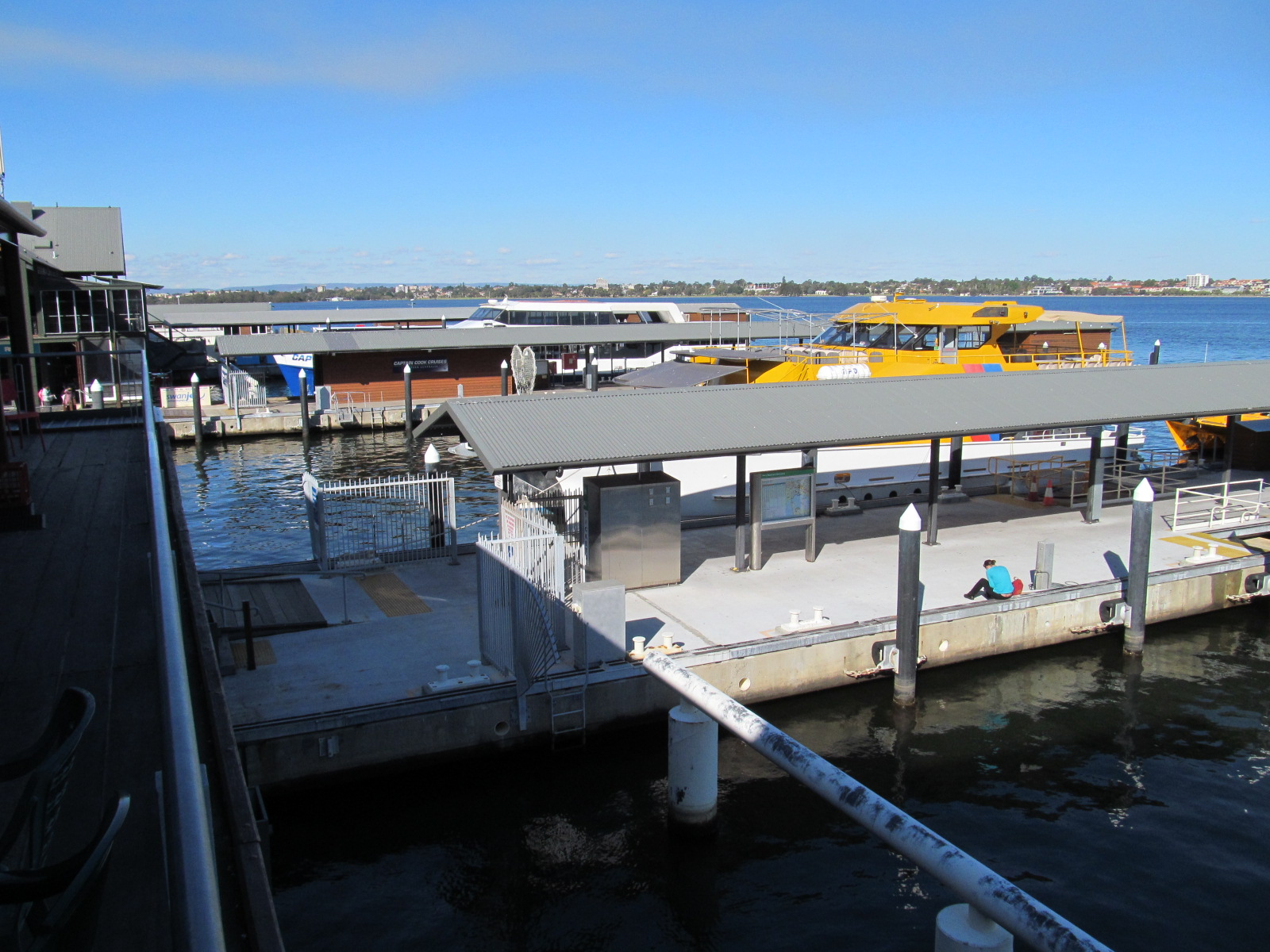
- Eastbound view in June 2013

General information
- Location: Barrack Street, Perth; Western Australia
- Coordinates: 31.9597°S 115.8581°E
- Owner: Government of Western Australia
- Operator: Department of Transport

Other information
- Website: www.developmentwa.com.au

History
- Former names: King Cole's Jetty
Location

Barrack Street Jetty is an entertainment precinct and transport hub on the edge of Perth Water in the Perth central business district, Western Australia. Located at the end of Barrack Street, it comprises five piers, with bars, cafes and restaurants along the foreshore. Pier 1 is the easternmost pier, and pier 5 is the westernmost pier.

The first pier built on the site opened as King Cole's Jetty, named after Henry Laroche Cole, the first chairman of the Perth City Council. Today five piers exist.

As part of the Elizabeth Quay project, Barrack Street Jetty was reconfigured with piers 1 and 5 extended and pier 6 demolished. In April 2024, the Government of Western Australia announced that pier 1 would be demolished and rebuilt.

== Services ==
Transperth services formerly operated from pier 3 to Coode Street and Mends Street. The former ceased in May 2005 due to lack of patronage, while the latter ceased in January 2016 with services diverted to Elizabeth Quay Jetty. Rottnest Express operate services to Rottnest Island from pier 4.

Various cruise operators, including Captain Cook Cruises, use the jetty.

== Transport links ==
Transperth operates one bus route via Barrack Street Jetty, the Blue CAT. It was historically a terminus for the tram and trolleybus services.
