= Transperth =

Suburban public transport system serving Perth, Western Australia

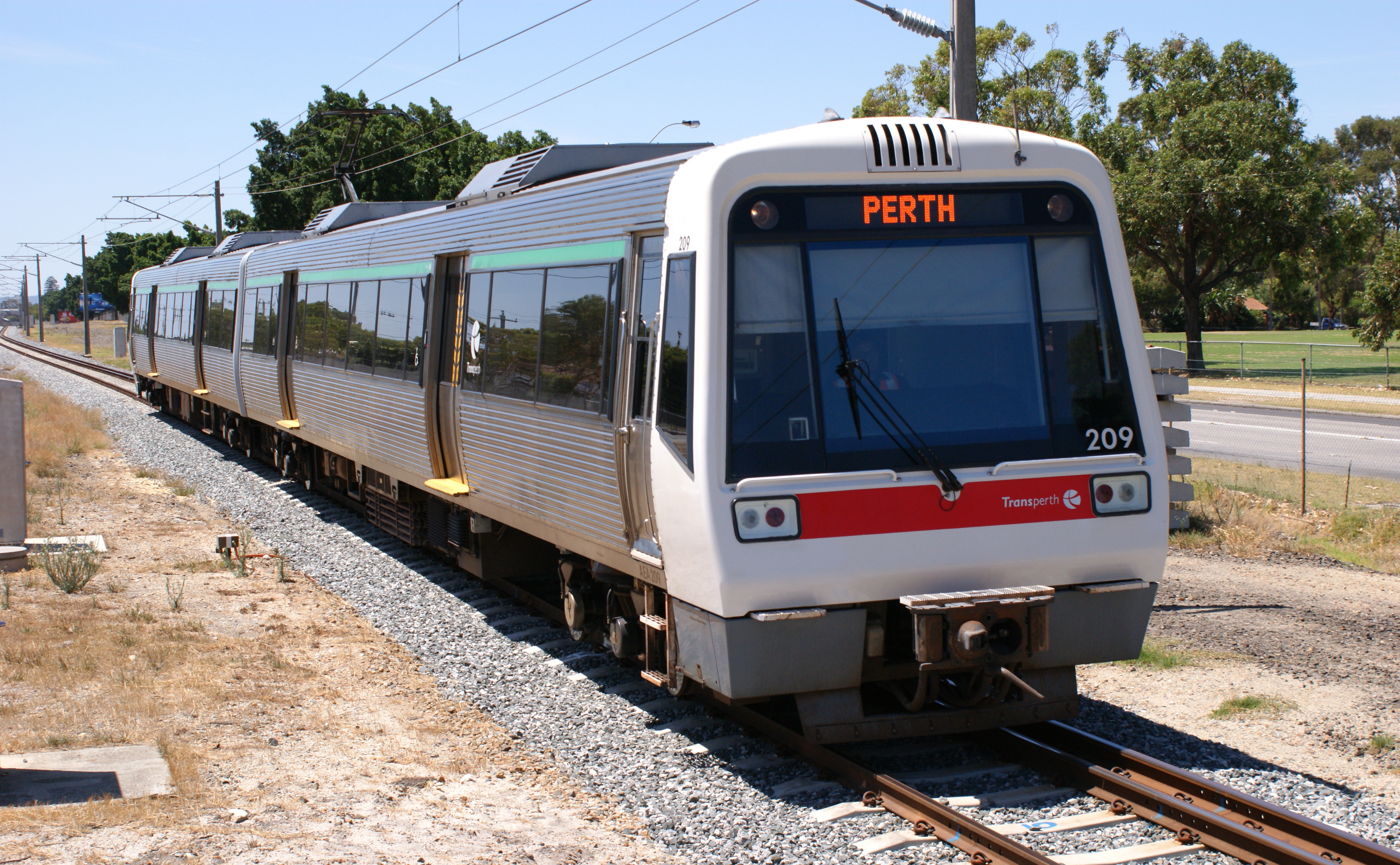
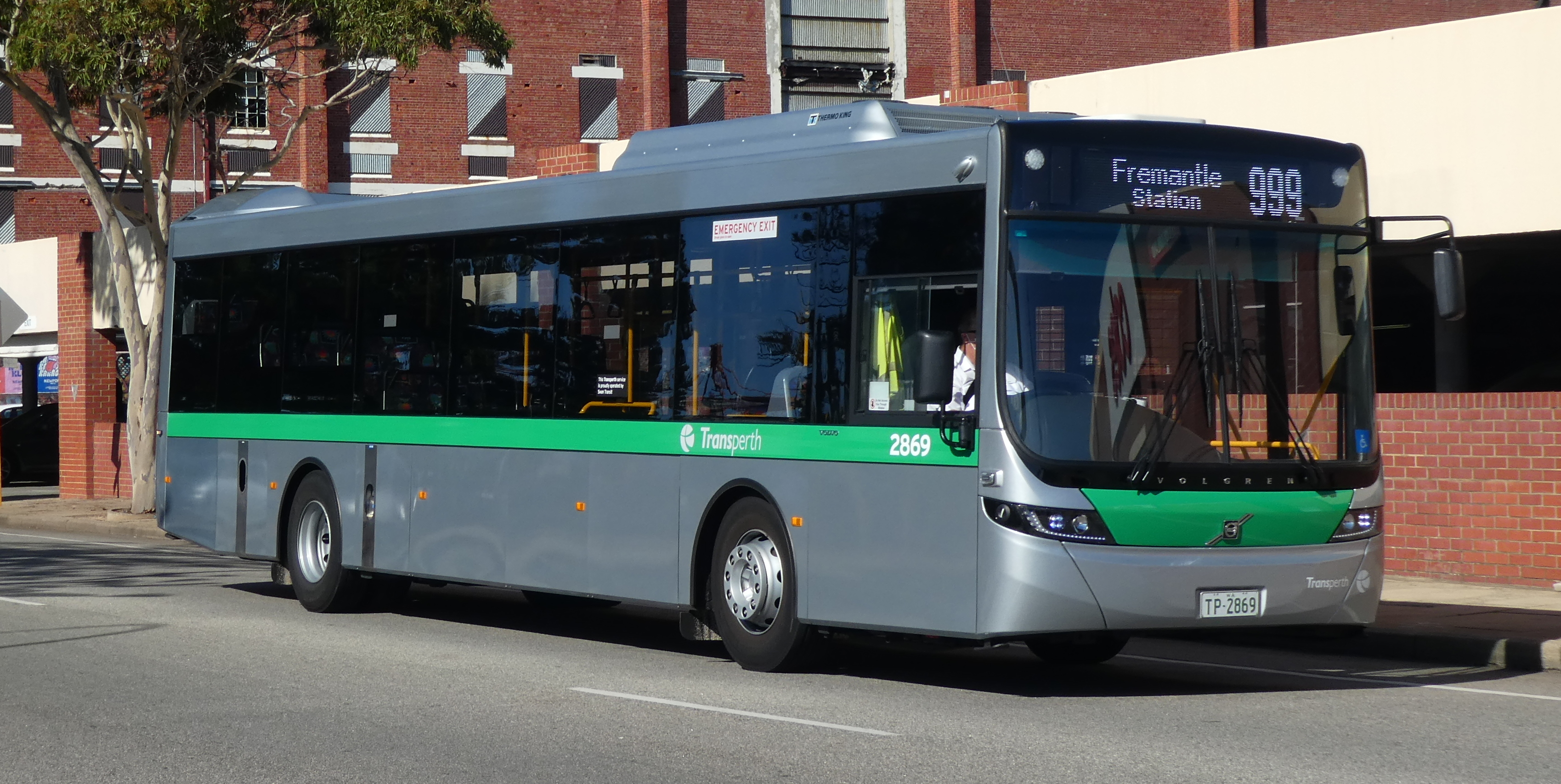
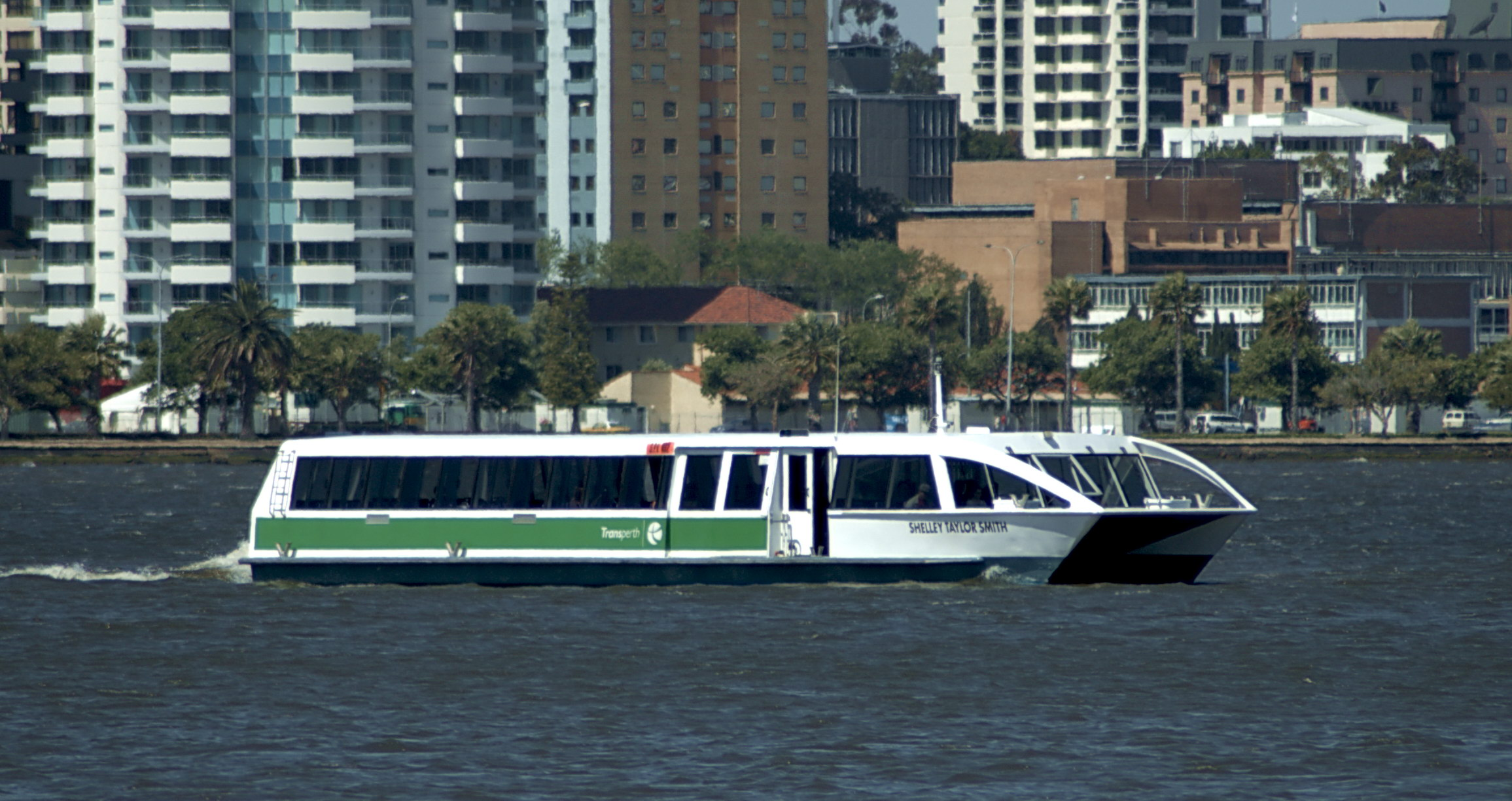
- From top left to bottom right: a B-series train on the Thornlie–Cockburn line, an A-series train on the Midland line, a Volvo B8RLE in Fremantle, MV Shelley Taylor-Smith

Overview
- Owner: Public Transport Authority
- Area served: Perth and surrounding areas
- Transit type: Bus, ferry, rail
- Number of lines: 8 (train)
- Number of stations: 85 (train) (Note: 86 stations if Perth station and Perth Underground station are counted as the same station.); 54 (bus) (Note: 46 of these bus stations are located at railway stations.)
- Annual ridership: 161,223,754 (year to June 2026)
- Headquarters: Public Transport Centre
- Website: Transperth

Operation
- Operators: Captain Cook Cruises; Path Transit; Swan Transit; Transdev WA; Transperth Train Operations; WAGR (former); MTT (former)
- Number of vehicles: 1690 buses 342 railcars 3 ferries

Technical
- Track gauge: 1,067 mm (3 ft 6 in) narrow gauge
- Electrification: 25 kV 50 Hz AC from overhead catenary

Transperth is the public transport system for Perth and surrounding areas in Western Australia. It is managed by the Public Transport Authority (PTA), a state government organisation, and consists of train, bus and ferry services. Bus operations are contracted out to Swan Transit, Path Transit and Transdev. Ferry operations are contracted out to Captain Cook Cruises. Train operations are done by the PTA through their Transperth Train Operations division.

The Transperth train system consists of eight lines: the Airport, Armadale, Ellenbrook, Fremantle, Mandurah, Midland, Thornlie–Cockburn, and Yanchep lines; and 85 stations. Train services have operated since 1881. The Transperth bus system has over 1,499 buses and 51 bus stations, 38 of which are interchanges at railway stations. Buses have operated under private operators from 1903; these private operators were bought out by the Metropolitan Transport Trust starting in 1958. Contracting out the bus operations began in the mid-1990s. The Transperth ferry system has one route, two stops, and three ferries. The system extends as far north as Two Rocks on the outer north of the Perth metropolitan area, Wundowie in the Shire of Northam, and Waroona in the Shire of Waroona. Fares are paid using the SmartRider system or using cash or contactless payments. With 123,307,689 boardings in the year to June 2023, Transperth has the fourth highest patronage in Australia, although the train system has Australia's third highest train patronage.

== History ==
The first railway in Perth was the Eastern Railway from Fremantle to Guildford via Perth, which opened on 1 March 1881. Western Australian Government Railways (WAGR) was formed in 1890 as the operator of railways in Perth and Western Australia. The South Western Railway opened on 2 May 1893. On 28 September 1899, the first trams in Perth began operating.

In 1903, the first private bus operator began, operating routes from Victoria Park to the Perth central business district (CBD). Trams in Fremantle began operating in 1905 and were abolished in 1952. The first diesel railcars, the WAGR ADG class, entered service on 28 November 1954, replacing steam locomotives. This allowed for shorter stop spacings, leading to the opening of seven new railway stations on that date.

On 15 January 1958, the Metropolitan Transport Trust (MTT) was formed, and began to acquire the various private bus operators in Perth. The MTT also operated Perth's ferry services. Perth's last tram ran in 1958 as well. By 5 October 1968, suburban rail services were fully operated by diesel railcars. In the late-1960s, the Midland line was converted from narrow gauge to dual gauge, allowing standard gauge trains to travel from the eastern states to East Perth railway station. The gauge conversion necessitated the rebuild of several stations and bridges along the Midland line. In 1969, the last trolleybuses in Perth ran. The management of Perth's public transport was integrated into a single body in 1974 when the MTT took over the management of Perth's suburban rail services from WAGR. The MTT contracted out the operations of the suburban rail services back to WAGR. Throughout the 1970s, bus stations opened across the Perth metropolitan region, starting with Morley bus station (now Galleria bus station) in August 1972 and Wellington Street bus station in March 1973.

The Fremantle line was closed to passenger services on 1 September 1979, despite a 100,000 signature petition calling for the closure to be cancelled. Following a change in government at the 1983 state election, the Fremantle line was reopened. The government then decided to electrify the existing suburban rail lines and build the Yanchep line (known at the time as the Joondalup line). On 31 August 1986, the MTT adopted Transperth as its trading name, marking the first time that the name Transperth has been used for Perth's public transport system. Construction for the Joondalup line commenced on 14 November 1989. The electrification of the rail network was completed by September 1991 and the Transperth A-series trains entered service, replacing the diesel railcars. The Joondalup line partially opened on 21 December 1992 and fully opened in March 1993. Later that year, the Joondalup line was extended to Currambine railway station.

The operation of Transperth services underwent a reorganisation in the mid-1990s, with bus and ferry operations contracted out to private operators. Responsibility for managing the system was transferred to the Department of Transport. The Transperth brand was also transferred to the Department of Transport, with the brand to be used by all the companies which were to operate services under contract. The MTT adopted the trading name MetroBus on 14 February 1995. The operation of the ferries was transferred to Captain Cook Cruises in February 1995. It was initially planned that MetroBus would compete with the private sector for contracts, and it was successful in bidding for the Joondalup North, Armadale South and Perth CATs contracts in 1995 and 1996 whilst several other contracts were awarded to the private sector. The government later announced that it would withdraw MetroBus from operating and it would tender out the remaining contract areas. MetroBus ceased operating bus services on 4 July 1998.

In December 1999, enabling legislation for the Mandurah line was passed, paving the way for the construction of the line. It was initially planned to branch off the Armadale line, but was later rerouted to go via a direct route south of Perth in the median of the Kwinana Freeway, necessitating tunnelling under the Perth CBD. This led to the development of the Thornlie–Cockburn line as a branch off the Armadale line instead. On 1 July 2003, the Public Transport Authority was formed, taking over from the Department of Transport of the ownership and management of Transperth services. An extension of the Joondalup line to Clarkson station opened on 4 October 2004. The first Transperth B-series trains enter service in 2004 as well and Nowergup railcar depot opens. Thornlie station opened on 7 August 2005, and on 23 December 2007, the Mandurah line opened.

On 21 September 2014, an extension of the Joondalup line to Butler station opened. In July 2016, the Perth Busport opened, replacing Wellington Street bus station. The busport is underground and has a dynamic bus stand allocation system to increase capacity for the same number of bus stands. On 3 November 2016, construction begins on the Forrestfield–Airport Link, later to become known as the Airport line. In 2018 and 2019, the government passed legislation to construct an extension of the Joondalup line to Yanchep, the Ellenbrook line as a spur off the Midland line, and an extension of the Thornlie line to Cockburn Central station along the Mandurah line, completing the original plans for the Mandurah line to spur off the Armadale line. These projects are all part of the Metronet project to improve Perth's public transport system, which involves several station rebuilds and improvements as well. The Airport line opened on 9 October 2022 and the Yanchep extension opened on 14 July 2024, coinciding with the renaming of the Joondalup line to the Yanchep line. In January 2023, testing for the Transperth C-series train commenced. These trains entered service on 8 April 2024. The Ellenbrook line opened on 8 December 2024, while 8 June 2025 saw the opening of the Thornlie–Cockburn line. An extension to Byford of the Armadale line opened on 12 October 2025.

== Services ==
Transperth services run as far as Two Rocks on the outer north of the Perth metropolitan area, Wundowie in the Shire of Northam, and Bouvard in the south of Mandurah.

=== Train ===
Transperth rail map during early 2025

The Transperth train system consists of eight lines: the Airport, Armadale, Ellenbrook, Fremantle, Mandurah, Midland, Thornlie–Cockburn, and Yanchep lines. These lines all meet at Perth station and Perth Underground (used by the Yanchep and Mandurah lines) in the city's CBD, radiating out from there. The Thornlie-Cockburn Line has been recently built and was opened in mid 2025. There are several other extensions and upgrades under construction as well under the Metronet project. The system has 85 stations along these eight lines. Transperth is Australia's third busiest passenger rail system, behind Sydney and Melbourne but ahead of Brisbane and Adelaide. There are three trains used: the Transperth A-series train, Transperth B-series train and the Transperth C-series train which entered service on 8 April 2024.

=== Bus ===
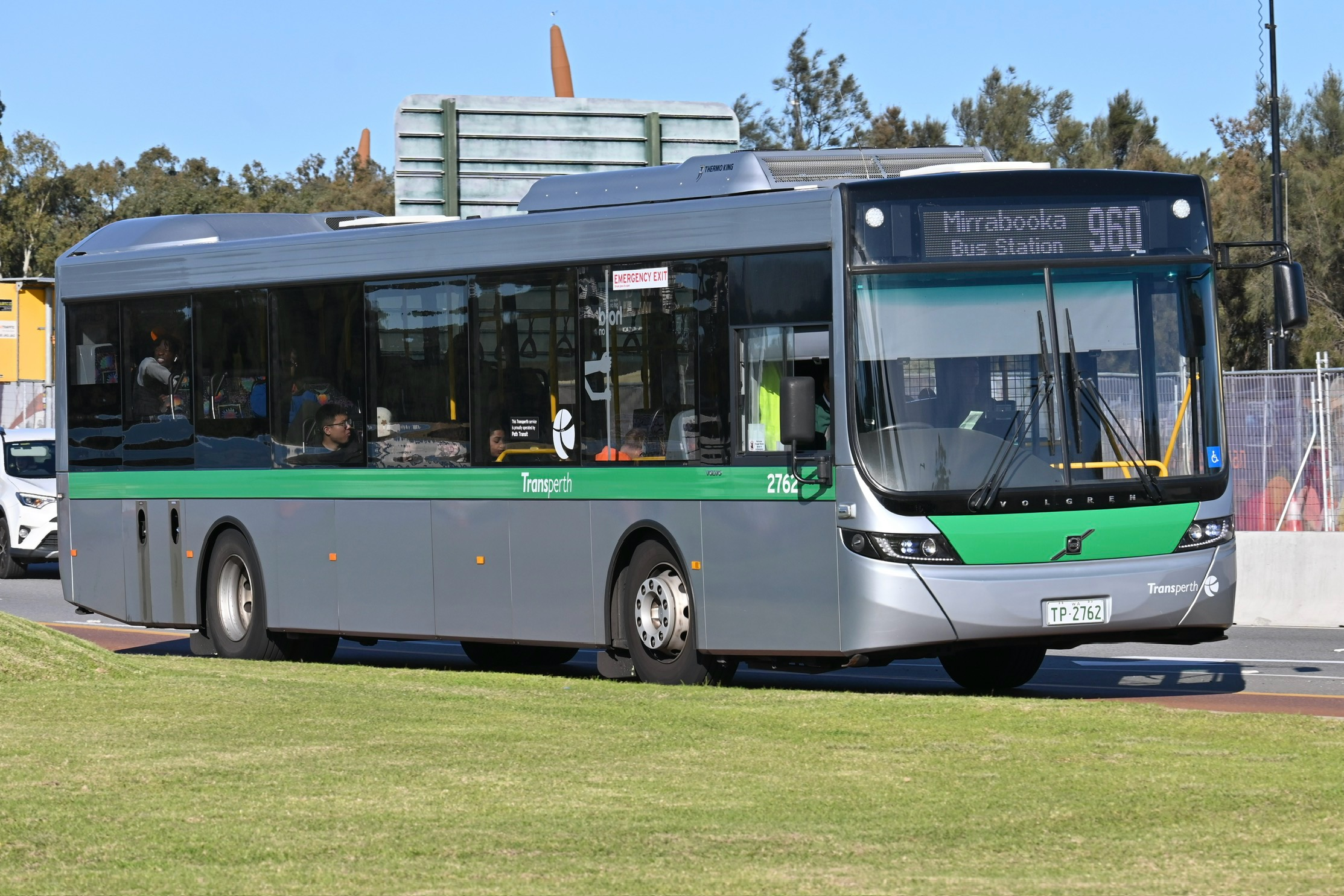
A bus operated by Path Transit

The Transperth bus system consists of 44 bus-train interchanges and 13 bus-only stations. The bus system is contracted out to private operators: Swan Transit, Path Transit and Transdev. The bus system is the fourth-busiest in Australia, behind Sydney, Melbourne and Brisbane.

=== Ferry ===
The Transperth ferry system consists of one route and three ferries. The line across the Swan River from Elizabeth Quay Jetty in the Perth CBD to Mends Street Jetty in South Perth. The ferries are the MV Shelley Taylor-Smith, the MV Phillip Pendal and the MV Tricia.

In 2024, prior to the Western Australian State Election, the Cook-Labour government announced their plans to expand the ferry service to Applecross and Crawley (UWA). The project is estimated to cost $107 million and include.

- Two new jetties for ferries in Applecross and Crawley near UWA.
- Improvements to Mends Street jetty in South Perth.
- 5 New locally made electric ferries to replace and expand the current fleet.

== Ticketing ==
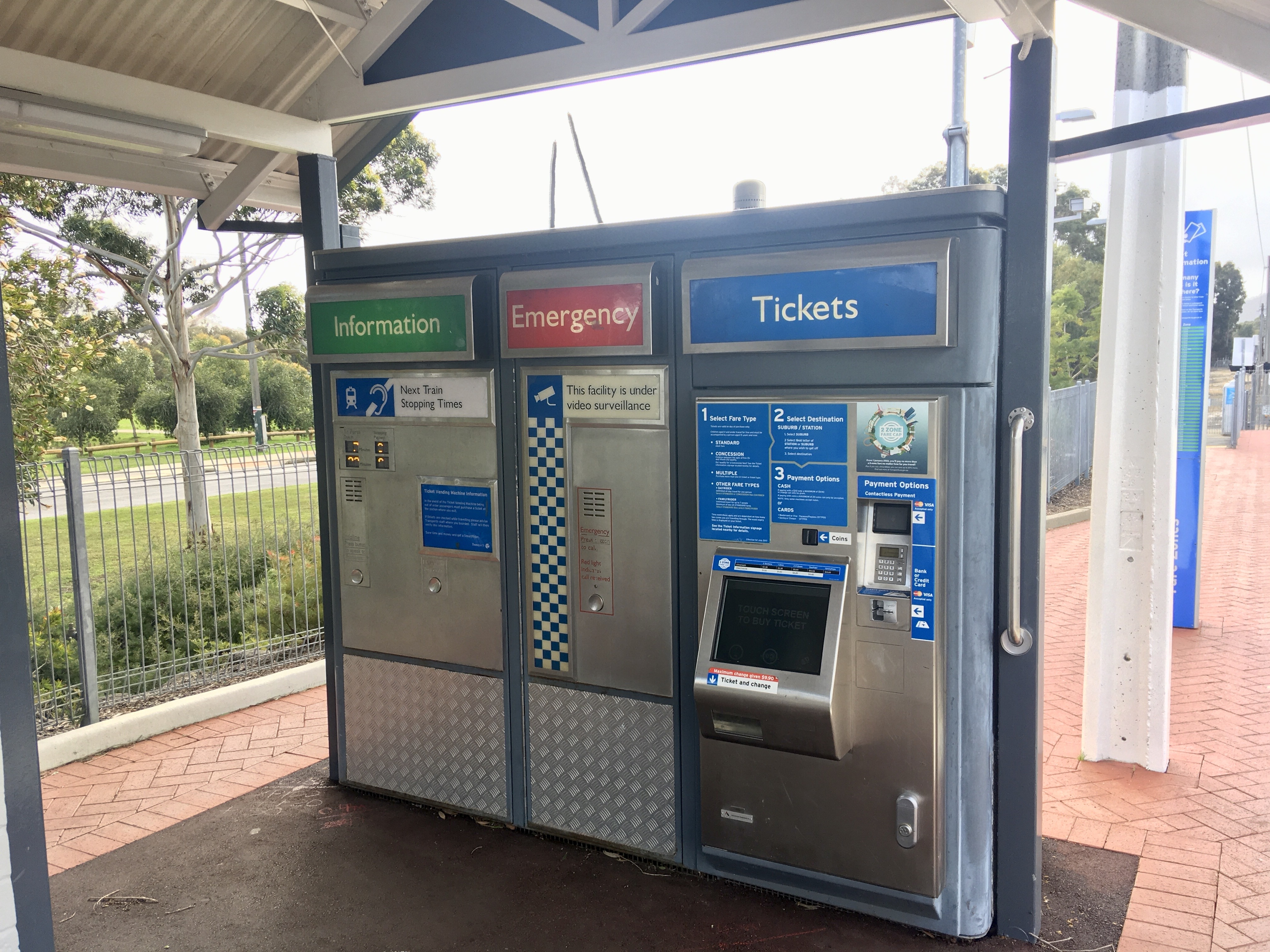
Information, emergency, and ticket machines at Challis station

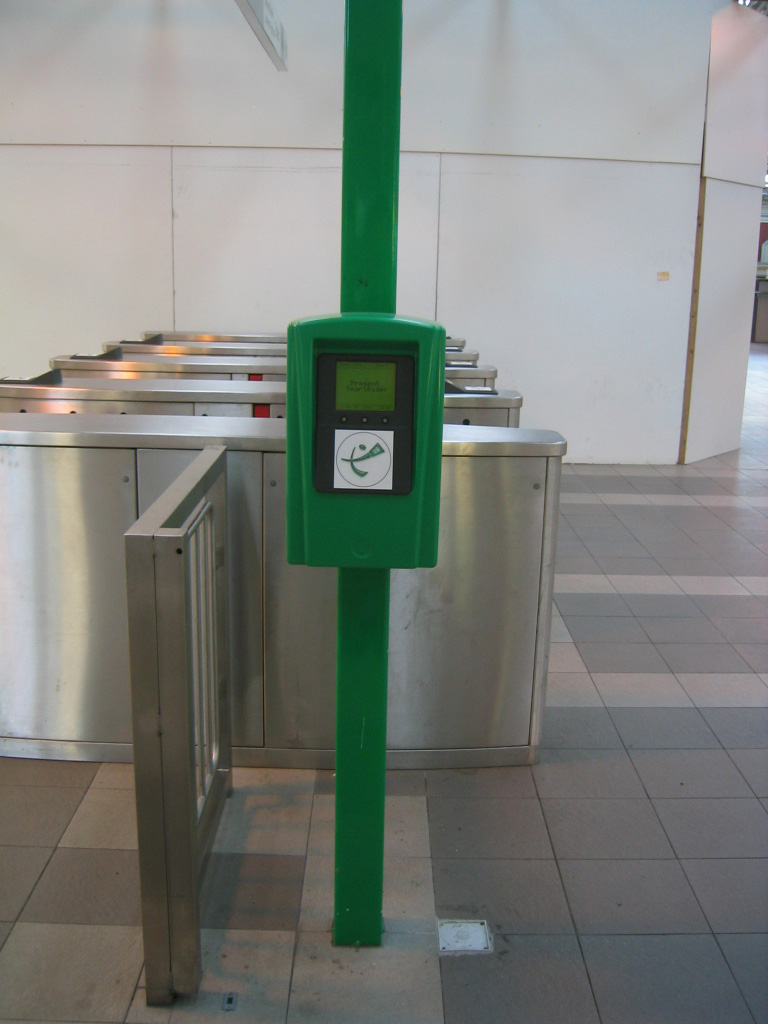
SmartRider tag machine and fare gates behind at Perth station

The fare structure and ticketing system is the same for the bus, train and ferry network. A number of ticket types are available for purchase by travellers, which can be paid for using SmartRider cards, cash or contactless payments.

The Transperth system is split into nine concentric zones, radiating out from the centre of Perth. Zone one extends 8 kilometres (5.0 mi) from the centre of Perth, zones two and three consist of bands 9 kilometres (5.6 mi) wide, and the remaining zones consist of bands 10 kilometres (6.2 mi) wide.

Prior to January 2022, travelling within one zone cost a one-zone fare, with higher fares applied to travellers using two or more zones, up to a nine zone fare for travelling though all nine zones. Multiple trips, including transfers between modes and services, were possible under the same fare as long as this is done within two hours for journeys four zones or less or three hours for journeys of five zones or more. In January 2022, a two-zone fare cap was instituted by the McGowan government as an election promise prior to the 2021 state election. Since February 2024, travel has been free for everyone with a SmartRider each Sunday. In January 2026, the two-zone fare cap was replaced by a flat "Go Anywhere" fare for unlimited travel within three hours across the entire Transperth network.

There are other ticket types available for passengers. The "two-section" fare is less than a one-zone fare and is for one-way trips below 3.2 kilometres (2 mi). Primary and secondary school students with a Student SmartRider can travel for free on weekdays during the school year, and with a concession fare other days. The DayRider ticket allows unlimited travel for one day. The FamilyRider ticket allows unlimited travel for up to seven people for one day under certain conditions and at certain times.

As of 2022, 79% of all fares were paid for using a SmartRider card, a contactless stored-value card introduced in 2007. Paying for paper tickets using cash is also possible. Tickets can be issued on all buses and ferries and from ticket machines at train stations and ferry jetties. SmartRiders can only be purchased at certain retail stores, Transperth InfoCentres, and at SmartRider Hub machines at selected bus and railway stations; they are not purchasable at every station or on buses. Methods for adding money to the SmartRider card include using SmartRider Hub and stand alone "add-value" machines at certain stations, on buses and ferries, at certain retail stores and Transperth InfoCentres, BPAY through online banking, and by setting up "Autoload", where direct debits are made automatically from a bank account to a SmartRider. Fares for using a SmartRider cost 10% less than paper tickets, and 20% less if "Autoload" is used. To use a SmartRider card, users must "tag on" at the start of a journey and "tag off" at the end of their journey, and the lowest possible fare is automatically applied. The daily spend on a SmartRider is capped at the DayRider cash fare.

People travelling to and from events at Perth Stadium do not have to use a SmartRider or pay for a ticket as Transperth fares are included in the cost of every Perth Stadium ticket.

From the 1990s to 2007, MultiRiders were used as multi-trip tickets. They used magnetic-stripe technology.

From December 2025, commuters became able to use contactless payment methods such as credit and debit cards and digital wallets on smartphones and smartwatches to tag on and pay at the start of a journey. Commuters using this method will pay the cash fare rate.

Cash and contactless payment fares as of 1 January 2026
Ticket Type	Standard	Concession
2 Section	$2.40	$1.10
Go Anywhere	$3.50	$1.60
DayRider	$7.00	$3.20
FamilyRider	$7.00	N/A

=== Free Transit Zone ===
Perth has a Free Transit Zone (FTZ) with zero-fare travel on buses and trains in its central business district.

On the rail network, however, free travel within the zone is only available to passengers who have a SmartRider card or use contactless payment, and tag on and off. This was not always the case, but is now required due to changes in station structures brought about by the implementation of the SmartRider ticketing system. For train passengers, the zone is bounded by City West, Elizabeth Quay, and Claisebrook stations.

The FTZ is funded by the Perth Parking Levy, a levy on non-residential parking bays in Perth, East Perth, West Perth and Northbridge. The levy was introduced under the Perth Parking Management Act 1999, and allows levy funds to be used for transport-related investments aimed at reducing private car travel into and out of Perth CBD, including the FTZ and CAT bus services.

=== Parking fees ===
Paid car parking at railway stations was introduced on 1 July 2014. The cost is $2 per weekday, free on weekends. SmartRiders or cash can be used to pay for parking.

== Patronage ==
Perth public transport patronage

FY	Patronage	±% p.a.
1900	10,200,000	—
1910	19,300,000	+6.58%
1920	35,900,000	+6.40%
1930	50,400,000	+3.45%
1940	58,800,000	+1.55%
1945	89,800,000	+8.84%
1950	85,100,000	−1.07%
1960	69,700,000	−1.98%
1970	67,600,000	−0.31%
1980	63,800,000	−0.58%
1981	63,700,000	−0.16%
1982	60,400,000	−5.18%
1983	61,300,000	+1.49%
1984	55,800,000	−8.97%
1985	54,100,000	−3.05%
1986	58,300,000	+7.76%
1987	59,600,000	+2.23%
1988	58,900,000	−1.17%
1989	61,400,000	+4.24%
1990	63,900,000	+4.07%
1991	61,500,000	−3.76%
1992	61,500,000	+0.00%
1993	63,200,000	+2.76%
1994	69,400,000	+9.81%
1995	71,900,000	+3.60%
1996	72,000,000	+0.14%
1997	76,500,000	+6.25%
1998	76,500,000	+0.00%

FY	Patronage	±% p.a.
1999	75,700,000	−1.05%
2000	78,600,000	+3.83%
2001	83,800,000	+6.62%
2002	86,000,000	+2.63%
2003	88,200,000	+2.56%
2004	90,578,121	+2.70%
2005	94,985,709	+4.87%
2006	98,526,382	+3.73%
2007	100,925,805	+2.44%
2008	108,793,703	+7.80%
2009	128,783,714	+18.37%
2010	131,629,344	+2.21%
2011	135,975,469	+3.30%
2012	144,130,087	+6.00%
2013	149,697,303	+3.86%
2014	147,640,687	−1.37%
2015	148,761,802	+0.76%
2016	145,632,675	−2.10%
2017	140,856,706	−3.28%
2018	139,847,149	−0.72%
2019	141,454,423	+1.15%
2020	116,552,397	−17.60%
2021	102,256,806	−12.27%
2022	102,202,990	−0.05%
2023	123,307,689	+20.65%
2024	144,228,346	+16.97%
2025	148,717,495	+3.11%
2026	161,223,754	+8.41%

Source: Bureau of Infrastructure & Transport Research Economics PTA

Transperth yearly ridership per mode
Mode	Patronage							
Mode	2006–07		2011–12		2016–17		2021–22	
Bus	64,622,615	64.0%	80,626,481	55.9%	80,016,728	56.8%	58,890,882	57.6%
Train	35,757,833	35.4%	63,029,878	43.7%	60,092,097	42.7%	42,779,726	41.9%
Ferry	545,357	0.5%	473,728	0.3%	747,881	0.5%	532,382	0.5%
Total	100,925,805	100%	144,130,087	100%	140,856,706	100%	102,202,990	100%

Transperth trains yearly ridership per line
Line	Patronage					
Line	2011–12		2016–17		2021–22	
Mandurah	20,293,223	32.2%	20,343,828	33.9%	14,357,888	33.6%
Yanchep (Note: Known as Joondalup line prior 14 July 2024.)	16,700,234	26.5%	16,658,559	27.7%	11,752,572	27.5%
Armadale and Thornlie–Cockburn	9,227,813	14.6%	7,385,888	12.3%	5,629,910	13.2%
Fremantle	8,679,139	13.8%	7,940,853	13.2%	5,217,162	12.2%
Midland	6,626,464	10.5%	6,143,986	10.2%	4,243,760	9.9%
Replacement buses	1,503,005	2.4%	1,618,983	2.7%	1,578,434	3.7%
Total	63,029,878	100%	60,092,097	100%	42,779,726	100%

== See also ==
- Transwa, for regional public transport in Western Australia
