= Mends Street Jetty =

Jetty in Perth, Western Australia

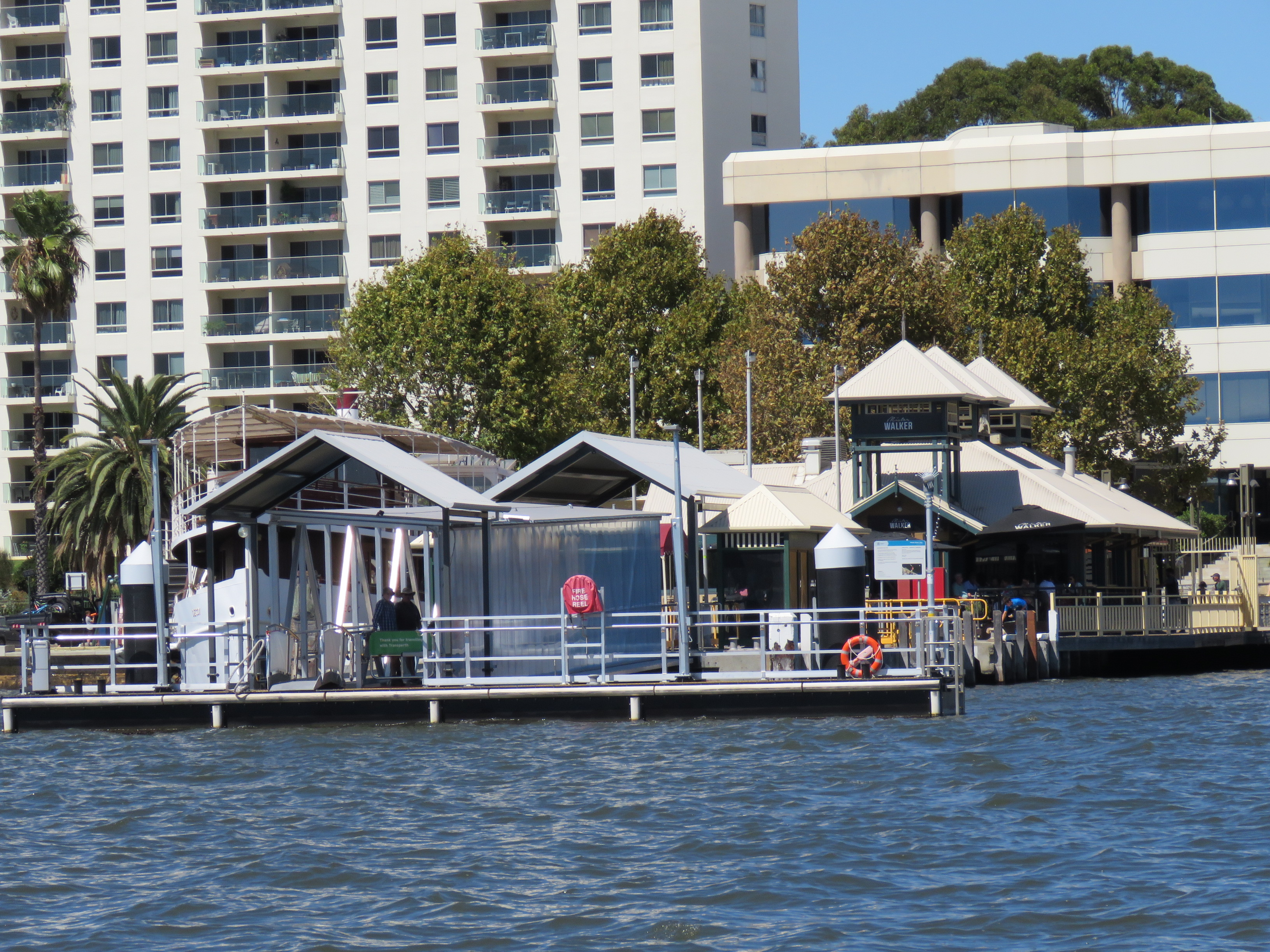

General information
- Location: South Perth Esplanade, South Perth; Australia
- Coordinates: 31°58′15″S 115°51′14″E
- Owner: Public Transport Authority
- Operator: Transperth
- Platforms: 1 jetty

Other information
- Fare zone: 1
Location

Mends Street Jetty is located in South Perth in Western Australia. Situated at the southern shore of the Swan River in the section known as Perth Water, the ferry service is primarily used for accessing the Perth Zoo from the Perth central business district while also being used for commuters.

== History ==
It is not known when the first jetty at Mends Street was built, however, with the opening of the Perth Zoo in October 1898 it was recognised that a regular cross-river ferry service was needed. Therefore, at about that time, the existing jetty was widened to 4.6 metres (15 ft) and an existing service that ran between William Street and Queen Street Jetty was extended to Mends Street.

The service was run by Joseph Charles, who operated the Queen (later Empress) and the Princess. A few months later, Charles and his partner S. W. Copley started operating the PS Duchess, a locally constructed vessel. Duchess made its inaugural run to Mends Street Jetty on 11 December 1898, and plied the route for the following 29 years.

Later services included a business, the Swan River Ferry company, operated by Jack Olsen and Claes Sutton, who ran a fleet including the Valfreda Valkyrie I and II, Valhalla and the Valdhana between jetties at Point Belches near The Narrows, Mends Street and Coode Street. In 2023 the jetty was extended and modernised for better accessibility, and the extension floats on the water to match the height of the ferry entrance instead of a fixed platform.

== Services ==
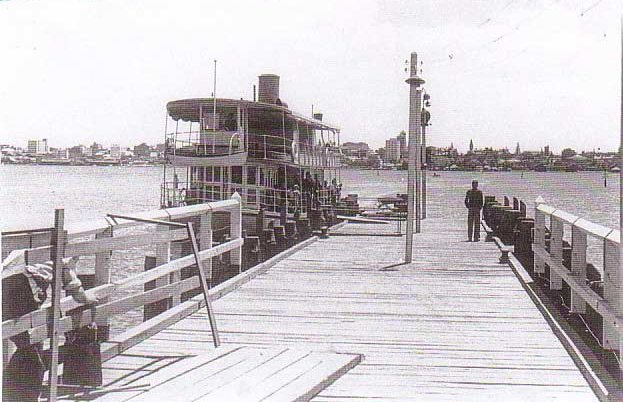
MV Perth, Mends Street Jetty in 1939

Mends Street Jetty is served by Transperth ferry services to Elizabeth Quay operated by Captain Cook Cruises.

Preceding station	Transperth ferries	Following station
Terminus	99998	Elizabeth Quay Jetty

The jetty is also used for charter ferry services.
