= Commonwealth Heritage List in Western Australia =

This is a list of places on the Commonwealth Heritage List in Western Australia. The Commonwealth Heritage List is a heritage register which lists places of historic, cultural and natural heritage on Commonwealth land or in Commonwealth waters, or owned or managed by the Commonwealth Government. To be listed, a place has to meet one or more of the nine Commonwealth Heritage List criteria.

== List ==
=== Currently listed places ===
Listed are all 19 places in Western Australia that are currently on the Commonwealth Heritage List in the state as of 2020:

Place name	Place ID	Class	Listed	Address	Suburb or town	Coordinates	Photo
Army Magazine Buildings Irwin Barracks	105215	Historic	22 June 2004	Brallos Pass	Karrakatta	31.9658°S 115.7946°E	
Artillery Barracks	105332	Historic	22 June 2004	2 Burt Street	Fremantle	32.0446°S 115.7546°E	
Bindoon Defence Training Area	105619	Natural	25 October 2004	Dewars Pool Road	Bindoon	31.2773°S 116.2864°E	
Cape Leeuwin Lighthouse	105416	Historic	22 June 2004	Leeuwin Road	Cape Leeuwin via Augusta	34.3750°S 115.1364°E	
Claremont Post Office	105526	Historic	22 June 2004	Bayview Terrace	Claremont	31.9813°S 115.7816°E	
Cliff Point Historic Site	105273	Historic	22 June 2004		Garden Island	32.1882°S 115.6756°E	
Garden Island	105274	Natural	22 June 2004		Garden Island	32.1992°S 115.6752°E	
Geraldton Drill Hall Complex	105658	Historic	22 June 2004	Cathedral Avenue	Geraldton	28.7758°S 114.6098°E	
Inglewood Post Office	106134	Historic	8 November 2011	885 Beaufort Street	Inglewood	31.9216°S 115.8851°E	
J Gun Battery	105272	Historic	22 June 2004	Entrance Point	Garden Island	32.1587°S 115.6647°E	
Lancelin Defence Training Area	105578	Natural	22 June 2004	Mimegarra Road	Lancelin	30.7977°S 115.3820°E	
Learmonth Air Weapons Range Facility	105551	Natural	22 June 2004		Learmonth	22.4491°S 113.8110°E	
Mermaid Reef	105255	Natural	22 June 2004	Rowley Shoals	Broome	17.1011°S 119.6252°E	
Ningaloo Marine Area	105548	Natural	22 June 2004	Commonwealth Waters	Ningaloo	21.8551°S 113.8619°E	
Northam Post Office	105528	Historic	22 June 2004	239-243 Fitzgerald Street	Northam	31.6551°S 116.6703°E	
Perth General Post Office	105527	Historic	22 June 2004	3 Forrest Place	Perth	31.9522°S 115.8589°E	
South Perth Post Office	105370	Historic	8 November 2011	103 Mill Point Road	South Perth	31.9733°S 115.8516°E	
Victoria Park Post Office	106197	Historic	22 August 2012	414 Albany Highway	Victoria Park	31.9748°S 115.8979°E	
Yampi Defence Area	105418	Natural	22 June 2004		Koolan Island	16.6763°S 124.2420°E	

=== Formerly listed places ===
Listed are all three places in Western Australia that were formerly on the Commonwealth Heritage List in the state as of 2020:

Place name	Place ID	Class	Address	Suburb or town	Coordinates	Notes	Photo
ABC Regional Radio Studio	106083	Historic	58 Tudhoe Street	Wagin	33.3089°S 117.3438°E	The ABC Regional Radio Studio in Wagin was listed on the Commonwealth Heritage List in 2011 but its closure was announced in November 2014. The Studio was the only Western Australian place removed from the Commonwealth Heritage List in 2018, along with eleven other places outside the state.	
Bushmead Rifle Range Commonwealth Area	105549	Natural	Midland Road	Helena Valley	31.9237°S 116.0206°E	Sold by the Commonwealth, became the new suburb of Bushmead in 2017.	
Kalgoorlie Post Office	105540	Historic	204 Hannan Street	Kalgoorlie	30.7465°S 121.4731°E	Removed from the Commonwealth Heritage List on 17 September 2015	
