= George Shenton Sr. =

Australian politician

- Born: 2 January 1811; Winchester, England
- Died: 25 March 1867 (aged 56); Mandurah, Western Australia, Australia
- Occupations: Pharmacist; Merchant; Banker; Philanthropist
- Spouse: Annie Catherine Cousins
- Children: 13
- Relatives: William Kernot Shenton (cousin)

George Shenton (2 January 1811 – 25 March 1867) was a pharmacist, merchant, banker and philanthropist in colonial Perth, Western Australia.

== Biography ==
=== Early life ===
George Shenton was born in Winchester, England on 2 January 1811. He was the second of four sons of a wealthy silk manufacturer. At the age of fifteen, he was apprenticed to a pharmacist named William Bilton. Bilton and his family were Wesleyans, and during his apprenticeship Shenton became a Wesleyan himself. In 1832, at the age of 21, he migrated to the Swan River Colony. His decision to leave England was sudden, and appears to have been a result of a falling-out between Shenton and Bilton. Shenton's cousin William Kernot Shenton had been in the colony since 1829, and this probably also influenced his decision.

=== Adult life in Australia ===
He arrived in the Swan River Colony in January 1833. He had a substantial amount of family money with him, and there is evidence to suggest that he put it to immediate use in aiding his cousin, who was in financial difficulties. Shortly after George Shenton's arrival, William Kernot Shenton obtained four and a half acres of land at Point Belches (now Mill Point), South Perth and began construction of a mill. The mill began operation in August under the company name W.K.Shenton & Company. George Shenton was certainly involved in the running of the mill, as he was at the mill, alone, in April 1834, when the mill was raided by a large party of Aborigines led by Calyute, who stole nearly half a ton of flour. In 1835, construction of a new mill began. The fate of the original mill is unknown, but the new mill stands today; known as The Old Mill, it is Perth's best-known historic landmark.

In May 1838, he opened for business as Perth's first chemist. The business was immediately successful, and in September he moved to larger premises. Having consolidated his pharmacy business, he began to diversify, importing clothing, household goods, furniture, and eventually almost anything for which there was a demand. He also became involved in banking, becoming a director of the Western Australian Bank on its establishment in 1841. Meanwhile, he continued his work as a pharmacist, taking on Edmund Birch as an apprentice in 1845. In 1845, he became involved in the export of jarrah and Sandalwood, and began to investigate the possibility of mining and exporting natural resources such as copper, lead and coal. In 1848, he joined with Anthony O'Grady Lefroy and Robert Habgood in the establishment of the Geraldine Mining Company, to mine the seam of galena that had been discovered in the Champion Bay district by Augustus Gregory.

=== Philanthropy ===
He gave strong support to the Wesleyan Church throughout his life in the colony. From 1841 he was secretary of the Wesleyan Committee, and was a member of the Wesley Church Building Committee. He donated both money and medicine to the church and its missions.

=== Personal life and death ===
On 29 November 1838, he married Annie Catherine Cousins; they would have thirteen children.

He died on 5 March 1867, when his schooner, The Lass of Geraldton, capsized off Mandurah in a storm. His financial affairs were taken over by his eldest son George, who himself became one of the most prominent merchants in Western Australia, a Mayor of Perth, and a Member of the Western Australian Legislative Council. Another son was prominent Perth businessman, Ernest Chawner Shenton who later ran the business which was renamed to E. C. Shenton and Co.
