= South Perth Esplanade =

Riverside park in South Perth, Western Australia

Coordinates: 31°58′08″S 115°51′03″E

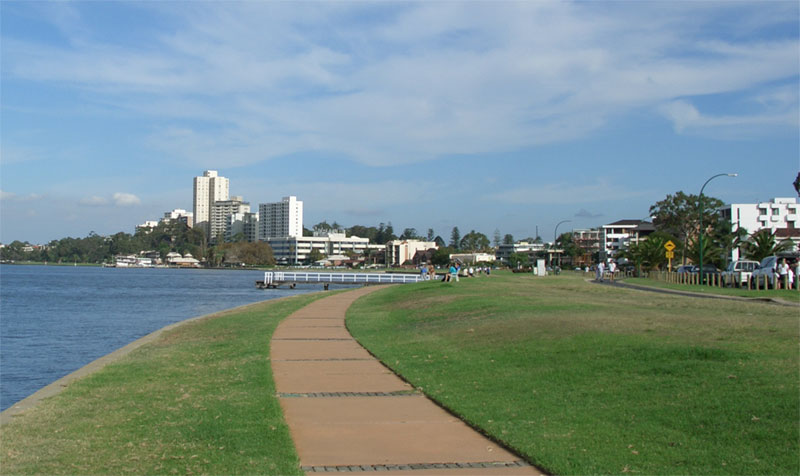
South Perth foreshore and South Perth Esplanade looking south east from near the Narrows Bridge, Perth Water to the left

South Perth Esplanade is the name of the foreshore area of Perth Water from Point Belches to Mends Street Jetty in South Perth, Western Australia.

It has been in the past susceptible to tidal and flooding inundations.

It has been a desirable location for real estate looking across the Swan River to the city of Perth, as well as watching the City of Perth Skyworks. The South Perth City council lists it as a park/reserve that can be hired.

The South Perth foreshore continues to the east, into the Sir James Mitchell Park.
