= Belches =

Belches may refer to:

- Peter Belches, early explorer of Western Australia;
- Point Belches, a geographic feature in the Swan River.
- Belches, physical reactions to a build up of gas in the digestive tract.
