= Inglewood Post Office =

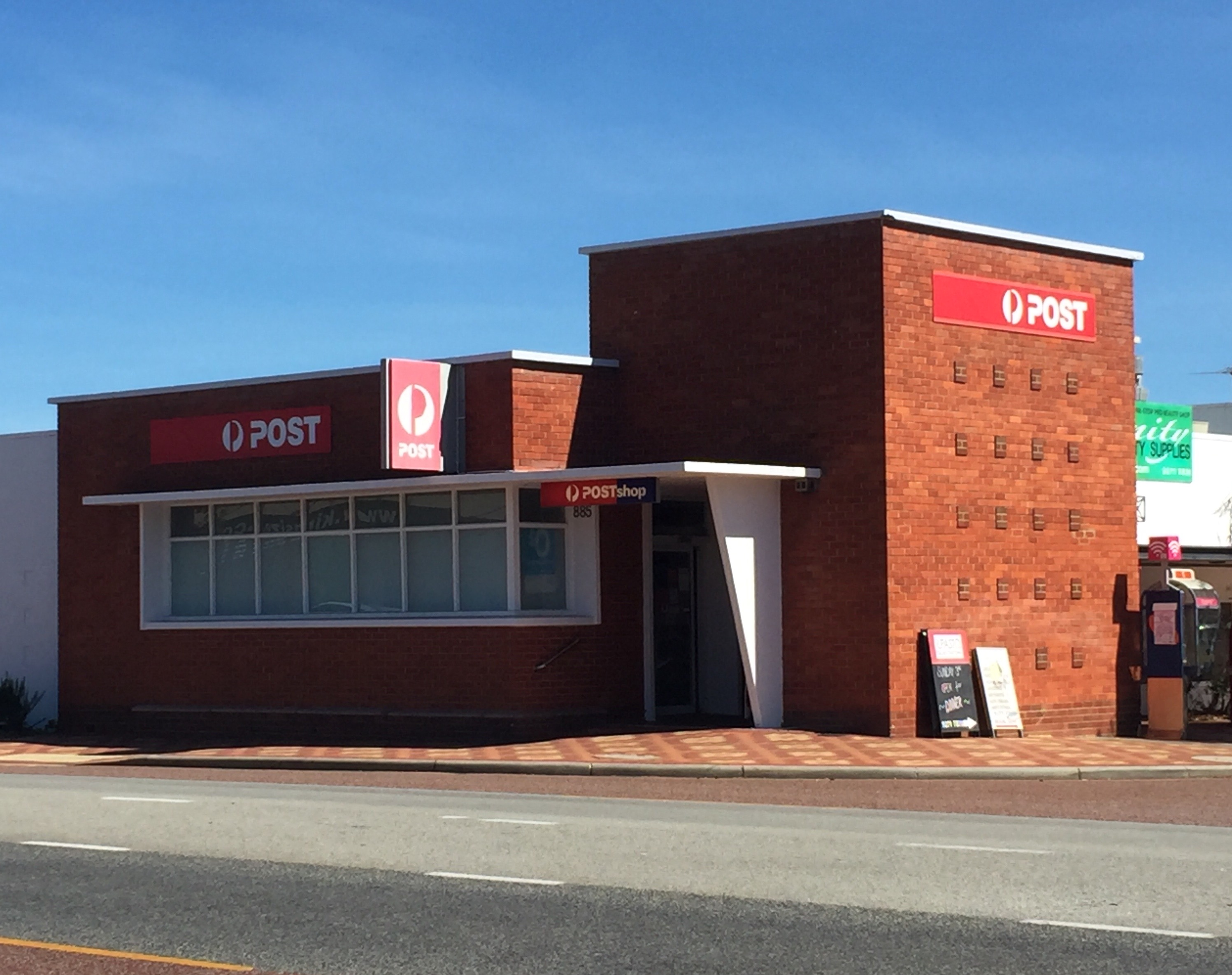

- Location within Western Australia
- 31.9216°S 115.8851°E
- Location: 885 Beaufort Street, Inglewood, Western Australia, Australia

Commonwealth Heritage List
- Official name: Inglewood Post Office
- Type: Listed place (Historic)
- Designated: 8 November 2011
- Reference no.: 106134

Inglewood Post Office is a heritage-listed post office at 885 Beaufort Street, Inglewood, Western Australia, Australia. It was added to the Australian Commonwealth Heritage List on 8 November 2011.

== History ==
Inglewood Post Office was constructed in 1947-49 by the Commonwealth Department of Works and Housing. Since its construction in 1949, the site has been redeveloped for postal and commercial purposes along the north and west sides. This has provided an office extension at the rear of the retail shop (west), a mail delivery and sorting room (north), beyond which are three large shop tenancies along Ninth Avenue. Directly opposite the post office is Inglewood Centre and Library, set back from the main road in a landscaped park.

In c. 1980s, the amenities area was refurbished as part of the post office's conversion to a retail post outlet and post office box depot. The entry doors were replaced with an automatic sliding door unit and the postal area refurbished to standard Australia Post retail design at an unknown date.

== Description ==
Inglewood Post Office is sited at the northwest corner intersection of Beaufort Street and Ninth Avenue in the Inglewood strip-shopping precinct. The civic centre, which includes the library and police station are located in a garden setting adjacent to the east and recently, pavements have been upgraded by in a patterned red brick paved surface.

Inglewood Post Office is part of the Beaufort Street retail precinct located between the fringe of Northbridge and Mount Lawley, suburbs initially developed in the Federation period. Beaufort Street leads down to the museum, library and gallery precinct in East Perth. In later developments, Inglewood, Mount Lawley and then Menora were prominent areas of new architect-designed housing in the 1950s and early 1960s.

The post office presents an elegantly composed front to the street corner that is an extension of de Stijl and Dudok-influences that became widespread in Australia during the 1930s and 1940s. The Beaufort Street frontage is the primary elevation given by two parapeted planar masses, constructed in sienna face brickwork. These planes are capped with a light concrete squared cornice which is linked compositionally to a cantilevered concrete hood over the main post office strip window. At the east end, the hood returns into the building to cover an alcove which flanks the main retail entrance. The alcove is given further prominence by an angled concrete fin wall, which is painted white, while the blind east brickwork wall features a gridded composition of projecting header coursework. Post office boxes have been installed in the east wall of the alcove and are serviced by a small storage area behind.

The side alcove provides covered entry to the post office through an automatic glazed sliding door, set within a deep concrete reveal. The retail shop is rectilinear in plan form with the counter located at one end. All walls have been refurbished by the installation of standard Australia Post livery and shelving which conceals the strip window along Beaufort Street. An office and storeroom are located to the rear of the main counter, built as part of the 1980s addition, using conventional finishes and fittings. From this point, a short ramp provides access to the mail sorting area along the north side. This area is utilitarian and has a concrete floor, painted precast walls and suspended plaster ceiling tiles.

The remaining section of the building runs in a linear direction to the north and parallel to Ninth Avenue. It comprises a narrow post office box lobby adjacent to the mail sorting room, three tenancies and a steel-framed awning over the pavement. Generally, it is constructed using precast concrete walls, a concrete floor slab, metal deck large span roof and suspended plasterboard ceilings.

=== Condition and integrity ===
Externally, the building's ability to demonstrate its original design is high. While altered by additions on the north and west sides, the original planar design is substantially intact and distinctive. The original face brickwork walls and side alcove including the distinctive concrete detailing also remain intact.

The interior has been entirely refurbished including full-height shelving, which conceals the strip window.

The building appears to be well maintained and in sound condition.

== Heritage listing ==
Inglewood Post Office was listed on the Australian Commonwealth Heritage List on 8 November 2011.

Inglewood Post Office is an example of:

1. Retail post office typology (third generation 1930–1974)
2. Postwar International c. 1940–60 (early Modern)
3. Commonwealth Department of Works and Housing work

Typologically, Inglewood Post Office is an early example the emergent importance of the independent post office box lobby integral in the design of the main postal building and accessible to the public 24 hours a day. Generally this function is resolved by adaptation: building an addition (Victoria Park and Kalgoorlie in Western Australia), infilling former verandah areas (Orbost, Victoria) or making incursions into building interior (Leongatha, Victoria). As with Port Hedland Post Office, at Inglewood the post office box function is integrally designed as part of the post office entry and has a physical proximity to the main postal chamber. While the building has been substantially extended along the north side and is now used for commercial purposes, the dual function of the original building front is intact.

Stylistically, the exterior of Inglewood Post Office is distinguished among post offices built since 1945, and is arguably the most elegant post office frontage remaining from the 1940s and early 1950s (nationally). It is also an important Modern Movement design given the relative dearth of surviving institutional buildings from this period, and additionally is one of the earliest unequivocally Modern Movement post offices designed by the Commonwealth Department of Works. In this context it is reforming in its new emphasis on line and plane. Inglewood has also been fortunate in having only minor alterations to its Beaufort Street frontage.

Architecturally, the existing building has a good level of integrity as far as materials usage and external conception of the original design are concerned.
