= City of Perth Skyworks =

Annual fireworks event in Perth, Western Australia

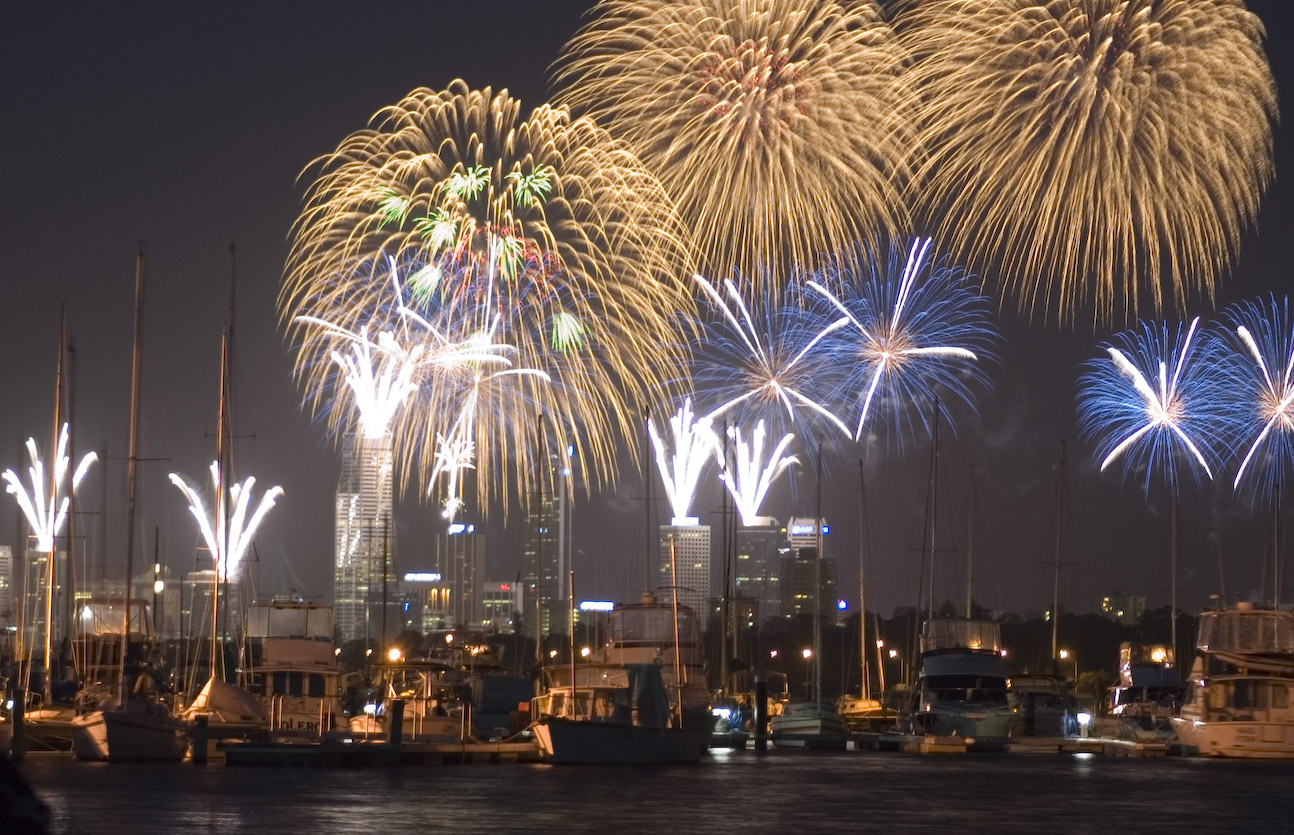
- 2006 Skyworks from the Applecross foreshore
- Genre: Fireworks display
- Frequency: Annual
- Location: Perth Water
- Years active: 1985–2022
- Inaugurated: 26 January 1985
- Most recent: 26 January 2022

The City of Perth Skyworks (previously named for other sponsors (Note: The show was previously known as the 96fm Sky Show (1985–1995), the Lotterywest Skyworks (1995–2009), and the Coca-Cola Perth Skyshow (2012).)) was a large scale fireworks show in Perth, Western Australia that was held annually on Australia Day (26 January) over Perth Water, the section of the Swan River adjacent to the central business district. For many years the City of Perth Skyworks were the largest fireworks celebration in the country on Australia Day.

The event ran every year from 1985 to 2022, except for 2017 when the show was cancelled due to a plane crash on the Swan River, and in 2021 when it was cancelled due to the COVID-19 pandemic. After the 2022 Skyworks, the City of Perth decided to end the long running event for a number of reasons including waning interest, environmental concerns, and the high financial cost of putting on the show. From 2023 onwards it has been replaced by a more modest and localised fireworks display coupled with a drone show presented in front of Langley Park.

== Overview ==
The Skyworks show usually ran for half an hour and involved fireworks launched from multiple barges in the middle of Perth Water and, for many years up until 2012, included launches from various buildings in the CBD. Earlier Skyworks shows had also occasionally seen firing points that included the Narrows Bridge, off moving boats and jet skis on the river, and fireworks suspended from helicopters. The fireworks were choreographed to a soundtrack which was broadcast on the event's main sponsoring radio station while the fireworks were underway, with a different theme given to the soundtrack every year. The Skyworks show was accompanied by supporting events and entertainment including concerts, festivals, amusement rides, food markets, and an air show with aircraft demonstrations and aerobatics displays over the river.

Many people travelled into the inner city to watch the event, while some people camped out from early morning to get the best view. The City of Perth initiated road closures surrounding the Perth foreshore as early as 6am on the morning of Skyworks, and encouraged spectators to use public transport to get to and from the event. Popular vantage points to watch the show included Langley Park, Elizabeth Quay, the South Perth foreshore, Sir James Mitchell Park and Kings Park. Perth Esplanade had also been a former major vantage point until the Elizabeth Quay development commenced in 2013. Some spectators viewed the show from buildings in the CBD or from boats moored on the Swan River, while others could be found watching from the tops of hills and bridges and from suburban streets and neighbourhoods that give views to the city, with the relatively flat nature of the Swan Coastal Plain allowing viewing from such elevated suburban locations. At its height over 300,000 spectators would regularly attend the event in the city; more than 400,000 spectators attended the show in 2004. In 2020, 250,000 people attended Skyworks. A delayed telecast of the show was usually broadcast by the event's major television sponsor since the mid-1990s and usually took place a few hours after the event finished with a simulcast on the radio. Another telecast replay usually took place on the following weekend.

In 2020 the City of Perth Skyworks was sponsored by the City of Perth, Lotterywest, Channel Nine and Mix 94.5. The City of South Perth also contributed funding to the event. The total budget for the 2019 event was $1,912,534, which included the cost of the fireworks as well as funding to stage supporting events and provide services such as first aid, portable toilets and traffic management. Lotterywest provided $435,000 in funding in the form of a grant.

Despite its popularity with the general public, the staging of Skyworks was a divisive issue for retail businesses in the city.

=== History ===
An old Skyworks logo, with Lotterywest as naming rights sponsor

The Skyworks started in 1985 in conjunction with 96FM and fireworks company Syd Howard Fireworks International, and quickly became one of the most popular events in Perth.

Many fireworks companies took charge in supplying the fireworks; Pyrostar International supplied many of the shows during the 1990s and early 2000s, while 2005 and 2006 saw Foti Fireworks in charge of the fireworks. 2007 to 2009 saw Howard and Sons responsible for the fireworks and Oracle Attractions were responsible for the laser show. In 2010 Foti Fireworks again took charge of the fireworks and every year from then until 2015, in which Skyworks 2016 again saw the return of Howard and Sons.

The 2021 Skyworks was cancelled because of the COVID-19 pandemic.

In 2022 Skyworks returned, with WA-based Cardile Fireworks taking on the event for the first time, with fireworks being launched from 21 barges. Due to the ongoing COVID-19 pandemic, the City of Perth initially required spectators aged 16 years and above to be fully vaccinated from the COVID-19 virus in order to attend Skyworks in the city, but this requirement was dropped two days before the event due to updated health advice. Despite this, concerns over community transmission of the Omicron variant resulted in a much smaller crowd of 100,000 attending the show compared to previous years. The 2022 Skyworks had a budget of $2.5 million.

Prior to the 2022 event Lord Mayor of Perth Basil Zempilas had suggested that Skyworks may be rested or retired in future, citing the sustainability of the event, environmental concerns, and the challenges of staging such a large scale event amid COVID-19 restrictions as reasons to discontinue the show. The controversy surrounding the celebration of Australia Day, as well as waning public interest in both the holiday and the event were also cited as factors to reconsider staging Skyworks. In March 2022 it was confirmed that future events would be scaled back, with Zempilas stating that "it would be irresponsible to continue with the style of event that we had in the past when we know that it is possible to do it in a more cost effective and environmentally-friendly way".

In April 2022, City of Perth councillors decided to end Skyworks after 37 years and replace the show in the following year with a more modest display at Langley Park. The subsequent 2023 Australia Day fireworks show was presented as an instalment of the City of Perth's ongoing City of Lights series of drone shows, but retained some of Skyworks' former supporting events such as the Birak concert celebrating Indigenous Australian culture. The cut down show was expected to save the City of Perth more than $1.5 million on the event. These smaller scale shows have continued in the years since.

== Incidents ==
In the 2000s Skyworks gained national notoriety as unruly and drunken behaviour by some spectators at the show became increasingly common, and drove families away from the event. After the 2004 show, police in riot gear fought running battles with drunken attendees along the South Perth foreshore, with several hundred people arrested that night. In addition, more than 300 people were also treated in hospital for alcohol and violence-related issues, including injuries from stabbings and random assaults. Although at the 2006 Skyworks the Western Australia Police Force successfully mounted an operation to minimise such behaviour, prior to the 2010 Skyworks major sponsor Lotterywest removed its name from the show after 15 years of being naming rights holder and threatened to revoke funding for future Skyworks due to the continued levels of violence at the event. Alcohol was ultimately completely banned at the 2010 event to prevent unruly behaviour, though it led to a reduced crowd of 250,000 people at the foreshore. In 2011 designated drinking zones, which made alcohol consumption outside these areas illegal, were introduced, and police took a much tougher stance on drunkenness and anti-social behaviour at the show. By 2015 Skyworks had returned to be a largely violence-free, family friendly event.

Due to Skyworks taking place in summer, the event has a notable fire risk. In the late 1990s several small fires erupted in the Kings Park bushland due to people igniting sparklers at the event; this led to the eventual banning of them. Police and emergency service officials came close to cancelling the 2007 Skyworks due to extreme heat and strong winds. During the display, fires broke out on three of the fireworks barges. No one was injured, but nearby spectators had to be evacuated due to the thick smoke that blew towards the area. The show's finale was cut short and nearly a quarter of the planned fireworks display was lost due to the fires. The 2012 Skyworks were also nearly cancelled due to extreme rain. The rain and thunder continued into the Skyworks, which onlookers said added to the experience.

Prior to the start of Skyworks in 2017, at approximately 5pm a Grumman G-73 Mallard seaplane stalled and crashed into the Swan River, a short distance from the Causeway, in front of thousands of spectators. Emergency crews and nearby people on the river rushed to assist, however the pilot Peter Lynch and the passenger on board died. As a result, as a mark of respect for the deceased and their families, to preserve an investigation scene, and amid concerns of aviation fuel in close proximity to the fireworks, the City of Perth cancelled the show.

== Other Australia Day fireworks in Perth ==
Partially in response to the violence and drunken behaviour of spectators that marred Skyworks shows during the 2000s, in 2007 Fremantle held a smaller, family friendly community-focused fireworks show at Fishing Boat Harbour for about 30,000 people as an alternative to Skyworks. In response, then-Perth Lord Mayor Peter Nattrass said "Comparing Fremantle's proposed Australia Day cracker show to Lotterywest Skyworks is like comparing the City of Fremantle to the City of Perth – it's second rate." The success of the event led the City of Fremantle to continue holding their own annual Australia Day fireworks display until 2017, when the event was retired due to the controversy surrounding Australia Day. Despite this, local business owners paid for their own private fireworks display to go ahead that year.

Local councils also held small fireworks shows in 2007 at Hillarys, Mindarie, Bassendean, Armadale and Wanneroo. Some councils continued to hold their own fireworks events in the subsequent years; in 2020 alternative fireworks displays were held at Armadale, Ashfield, Rockingham and Wanneroo.

The growing popularity of these shows and other alternative Australia Day events resulted in a reduction in spectator numbers at Skyworks.
