= Perth waterfront development proposals =

Proposals for north shore of Perth Water, Perth, Western Australia

Coordinates: 31°57′33″S 115°51′29″E

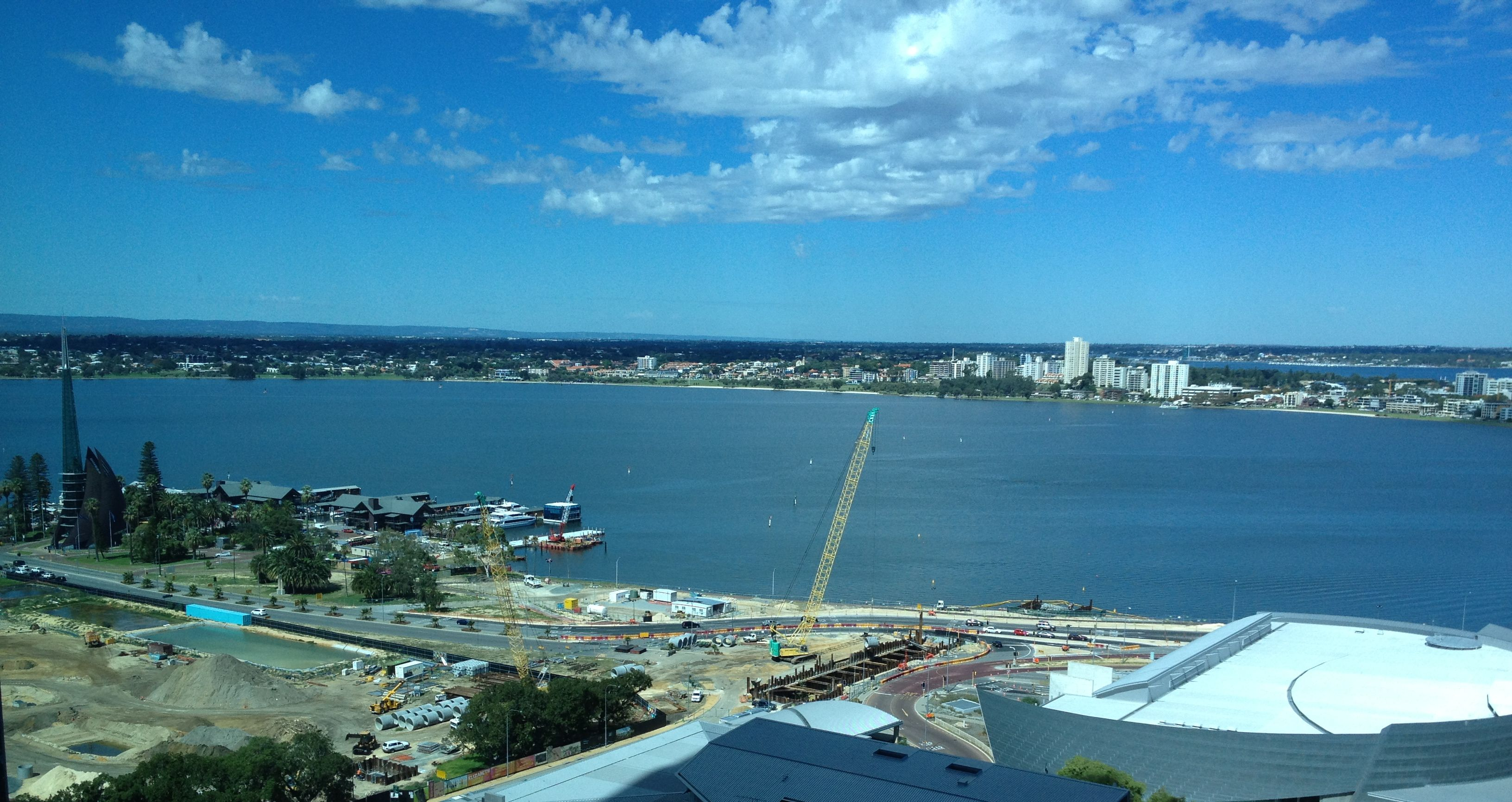
2013 development underway

The north shore of Perth Water on the Swan River frontage to the city of Perth in Western Australia has been frequently changed since the arrival of Europeans in 1829. Various forms and structures have appeared and been removed over the last 190 years. Jetties, ports and various forms of reclamation have moved the shore considerably into Perth Water. The main eras of reclamation were in the 1870s, 1900s, 1920s-1937, 1955–1959, and 1967.

Since the 1980s various proposals have been mooted by government and others to redevelop the foreshore area. These proposals are sometimes referred to as the Perth waterfront developments and have generally focused on areas around Barrack Square and the Esplanade Reserve.

The proposals are often characterised by opposition arguing that structures and facilities in the developments would create increased separation of the central business district from the river, further reducing access to the amenity. Conversely, others argue that the city/river vista to motorists along Riverside Drive would be spoiled. Some proposals have included traffic tunnels or land bridges to enable the city to "re-attach" to the river.

== Riverside Drive history ==
The laying of Riverside Drive as a subsistence project in 1937 provided an opportunity for the City of Perth to negotiate for control of the entire foreshore, which had previously been managed by the State Gardens Board. Designed as a boulevard, the Drive encouraged tourists and Perth residents alike to travel along the river, in a 20th-century version of the 18th and 19th century tradition of promenading. Riverside Drive was widened when works on the Mitchell Freeway interchange commenced in the late 1950s. In the early 1960s, a proposal to build a major freeway along the foreshore was being prepared by consultants for the Main Roads Department. Perth City Council, town planner Paul Ritter and others argued that traffic volumes didn't warrant the plan, and that the new north–south freeway system was adequate. Visiting architect Theodore Osmundson suggested in 1968 that the city ring freeway project being considered would "encircle[s] the city like an iron collar [which] can only eventually choke the central city to death". Riverside Drive was further modified in the 1970s to provide access to the Mitchell Freeway and again in the late 2000s as part of the sinking of the railway to William Street.

== CityVision, 1988 ==
External images
- CityVision 1988
- City of Perth 2005–2030
- Landcorp 2009
- 2012 proposal
- City Gatekeepers (2012)

CityVision is an urban planning think tank and advocacy group. In 1988 it published its first foreshore redevelopment scheme, which included a focus on development along Langley Park to the east, as well as a number of pedestrian overpasses crossing Riverside Drive.

The CityVision group has submitted a number of other designs for public discussion since then.

== Lawrence Government, 1990 ==
In December 1990, Premier Carmen Lawrence announced plans for an international design competition for a foreshore redevelopment. The competition had a first prize of $50,000, which was awarded to U.S. design firm Carr, Lynch, Hack and Sandell.

The winning design included a cable car from Barrack Street to Mount Eliza and Kings Park.

== City of Perth, 2005–2030 ==
A 2004 plan endorsed by the City of Perth in 2005 titled "Western Foreshore Scenario 2 – City of Perth 2005–2030" shows a more westerly development towards the Narrows Bridge with minimal realignment of Riverside Drive.

== Carpenter Government plans, 2008 ==
In February 2008, Premier Alan Carpenter announced plans for a $300 million redevelopment including multiple high-rise buildings with joint private and public funding.

The proposal included realignment of Riverside Drive.

He stated that work would start before 2012 if his government was re-elected. The opposition leader Colin Barnett objected to the plans, saying "people did not want skyscrapers on the city foreshore and the plan would create an exclusive enclave for corporations and rich apartment owners".

The Carpenter government was defeated at the 2008 election.

== Barnett Government plans, 2011 ==
In February 2011 Premier Colin Barnett and Perth Lord Mayor Lisa Scaffidi confirmed plans for a new project and funding, which included $270 million from the 2011/12 state budget. The project included construction of an artificial inlet to replace Esplanade Reserve, and modifications to the surrounding environs including Barrack Square. Nine large building sites will be constructed for residential apartments, commercial offices and retail space.
