= Windsor Hotel (Perth) =

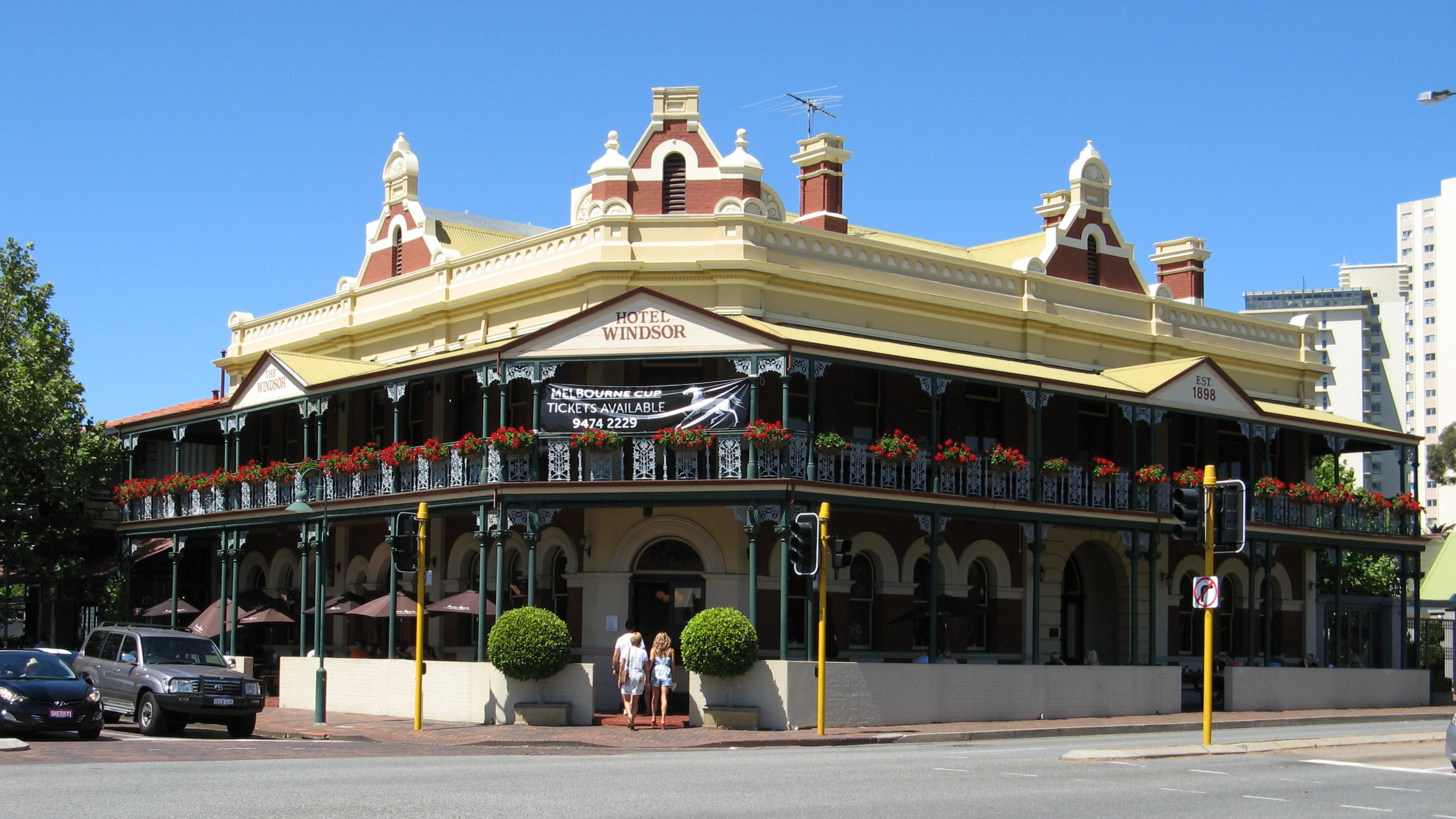
- The Windsor Hotel
- Interactive map of the Windsor Hotel area

General information
- Type: Heritage listed building
- Location: Perth, Western Australia
- Coordinates: 31.9731°S 115.8523°E

Western Australia Heritage Register
- Type: State Registered Place
- Designated: 27 February 1996
- Reference no.: 2392

The Windsor Hotel is a heritage-listed building in South Perth, Western Australia. Designed by J. J. Talbot Hobbs, the building is of Federation Filigree style. Built in 1898, it is one of the earliest surviving hotels in Perth's southern suburbs. The Windsor is sited to take advantage of patrons visiting Perth Zoo, coming via ferry along the Swan River. Since its construction, the hotel has had several major renovations.

== History ==
The Windsor Hotel was designed by prominent architect J. J. Talbot Hobbs, and built for George Strickland in 1898 at a cost of £4,050, equivalent to A$732,609 in 2022. The hotel opened on the corner of Mends Street and Mill Point Road at a time when the popularity of South Perth was increasing; by the mid-1890s the suburb was well established. In 1898, the Perth Zoo opened, along with a post office, which operated out of the hotel for a period of time. Part way through World War II, the Strickland family sold the hotel to Mary Thomas (later Mary Raine), who willed it to the University of Western Australia. Major works have taken place since the Windsor was constructed in 1898, with renovations carried out in 1962, 1965, 1970, the 1980s and 1991.

== Style ==
The building was designed in Federation Filigree style. The building is constructed with tuck-pointed brickwork in Flemish bond and its corrugated iron roof is concealed behind a parapet. The veranda and balcony extend along both street facades and are covered with a lean-to roof. The veranda roof is broken by gables, which highlight the main entrance to each street facade and the truncated corner. The veranda roof is supported on fine, ornamental cast-iron posts with capitals and cast-iron balustrading. Its intact street veranda and roof details are now very scarce and so have rarity value. The Windsor Hotel is representative of the Australian pub tradition: a two-storey hotel with verandas, usually located on a prominent street corner in a suburb or country town.

It was listed with the Heritage Council of Western Australia in 1995.
