= Victoria Park Post Office =

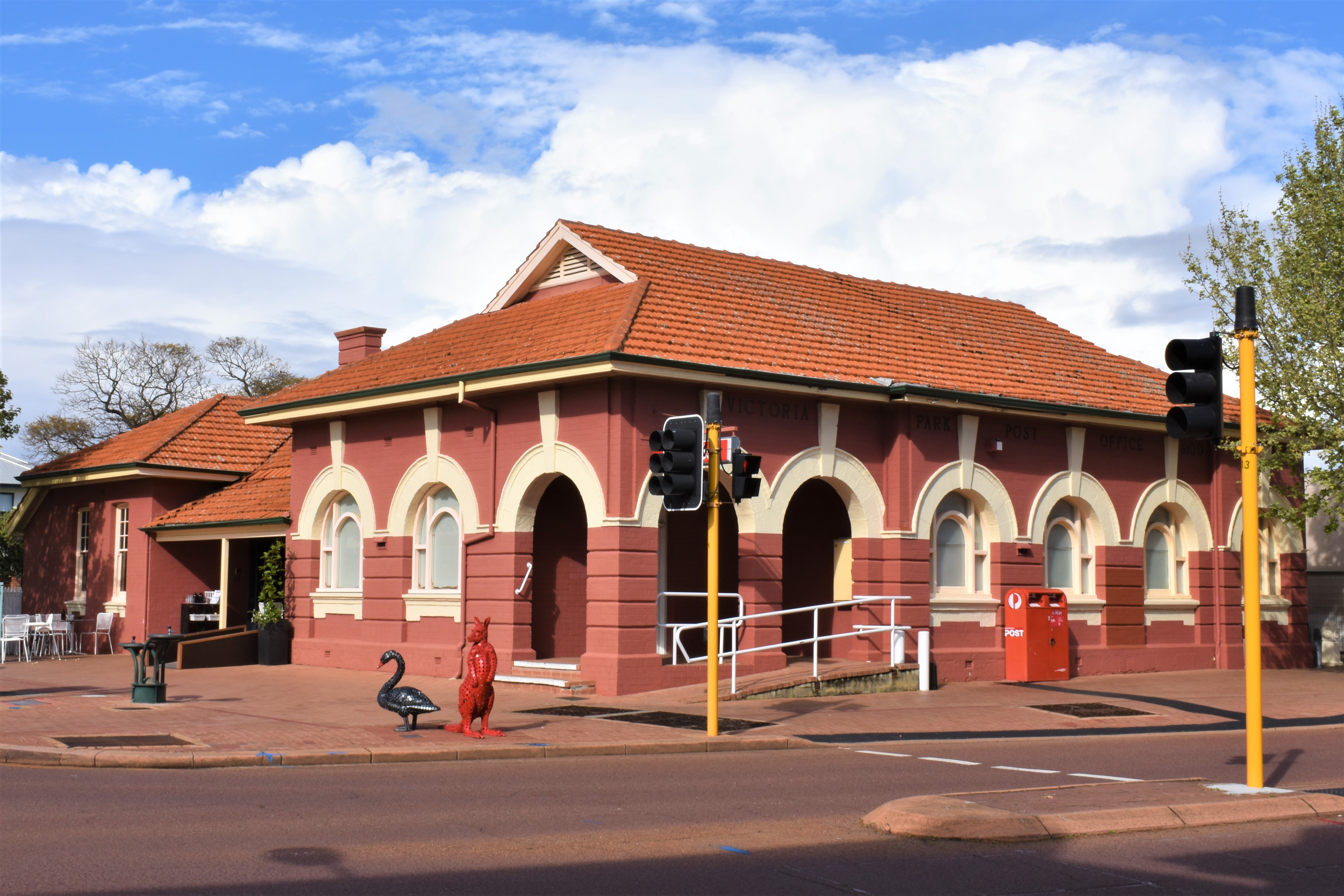

- Location within Perth
- Victoria Park Post Office is about 4.4 kilometres (2.7 mi) east of the old South Perth Post Office
- 31.9748°S 115.8979°E
- Location: 414 Albany Highway, Victoria Park, Western Australia, Australia

Commonwealth Heritage List
- Official name: Victoria Park Post Office
- Type: Listed place (Historic)
- Designated: 22 August 2012
- Reference no.: 106197

Western Australia Heritage Register
- Type: State Registered Place
- Designated: 11 October 1995
- Reference no.: 2222

Victoria Park Post Office is a heritage-listed post office at 414 Albany Highway, Victoria Park, Western Australia, Australia. It was added to the Australian Commonwealth Heritage List on 22 August 2012.

== History ==
Victoria Park evolved as a ribbon development flanking a main road, now Albany Highway, between Perth and the town of Albany. The first subdivision of residential lots began in 1887, and following the opening of Victoria Park railway station in 1893, and the gazettal of the Municipality of Victoria Park in 1897, commercial and residential development followed. In 1898, a post and telegraph office was established in Victoria Park and conducted its operations from leased premises. It was designated an allowance office in 1904 and later, in 1912, was granted the status of an official post office.

A site for a new post office was purchased by the Commonwealth in July 1913 on the eastern corner of the highway and Duncan Street. The intention was to redevelop a house then on the site to provide larger premises. Plans were prepared and signed by Hillson Beasley, Chief Architect of the PWD. In January 1913, the building contract was awarded to W. N. Roberts for £A 1711/14, equivalent to A$234,901.57 in 2022.

Victoria Park Post Office was built in 1913 as a face brickwork building with an attached residence to provide a three-bedroom quarter at the rear. Verandah entries were located on the northwest (Duncan Street) and northeast sides (rear yard) while the main corner entry porch had arched openings faced with brick piers and walling. It is possible that the postal hall ceiling had a dome over the main counter lit by the lantern. Internally, the accommodation included the postal hall, cashier's enclosure, telegraph room, postmaster's office, hall and mailroom.

The present presentation of the building began either with the revisions of June 1920 mentioned on Beasley's original plan, or from the rearrangement of residential facilities after this use altered in 1923. The quarters were reduced to a single bedroom and bathroom, the rear entrance verandah bricked in and replaced by a wall of post-boxes, sheltered under an extended verandah brought out close to the street. The remainder of the quarters were refurbished as a mailroom and offices, supplanting the original three bedrooms and living room. This included a postmaster's administrative office and telegraph room which replaced two of the bedrooms. The kitchen became a serviced staff room and the mailroom eventually occupied the parlour.

In c. 1940s, the wall dividing the postal hall and mailroom was removed, the main counter extended and a range of alterations were made to the doors and windows. Plans from this period also indicate fences, outbuildings, a garage and incinerator, all on the Duncan Street side.

Around the 1950s, two additional arches were built to the four originally facing Albany Highway. The mitred joint of the timber-slatted eave indicates the extent of the original roofline. While broadly identical in elevation, the coursed spandrel underneath each opening, led to the simplification of the sills rather than the stepped pattern shown in the original openings. Further alterations to the roof led to the removal of the original gryphons and lantern, and some chimneys may also have been removed at this time. Another set of internal alterations led to a simpler division of public area and mailroom, with a new postmaster's office at the rear and internal access to the post office boxes. The staff or "welfare" room was converted into a toilet block and the lunchroom relocated to the remaining former bedroom of the old quarters. The fireplace was removed from the public hall around this time, but all the other fireplaces remain, though blocked up. One houses a small safe.

Air conditioning was installed and two of the arched windows facing Duncan Street replaced by anodised aluminium-framed windows at an unknown date. The linoleum floor has been replaced with carpet in the public areas. A suspended ceiling has been added, probably at the time of the retail area conversion in the 1980s or 1990s with new fluorescent lights.

Further alterations of unknown date include a metal skillion roof and small office addition located on the east side of the former telegraph office and redevelopment of the bitumen rear yard as a loading bay and car parking area.

More recently, the former quarters have been refurbished and leased as private commercial offices.

== Description ==
Victoria Park Post Office is at 414 Albany Highway, corner Duncan Street, Victoria Park.

Victoria Park Post Office is freestanding and setback on an angle to the street corner formed by Albany Highway and Duncan Street. The original building incorporated a post and telegraph office and residence. The roadside setting contrasts visually to what is otherwise an undistinguished commercial strip of more recent construction.

The post office presents as a single-storey (overpainted red) brick building with contrasting rendered detailing, strongly modelled arched streetscape facades and tile-clad hipped roof forms, with gablet. The corner entrance porch is located in the south-west of the building, and has rendered arched openings with accentuated keystones, and rusticated piers providing access to the retail shop in a repositioned doorway. The building presentation to Duncan Street is broken into three bays, with the arcaded front to the post office bay, a skillion-roofed verandah to the middle bay (originally with a timber-posted verandah), and a further bay with a pair of rectilinear window openings. The latter two bays are part of the original residence. The Albany Highway frontage originally comprised a four-arched bay to the post office, incorporating the corner entrance porch, and a hipped gable and lantern to the roof.

The latter two elements, as well as gryphons, have been removed, and a 1950s addition extended this frontage to provide two further bays, built in a matching style. The mitred joint of the timber-slatted eave indicates the extent of the original roofline. While broadly identical in elevation, the coursed spandrel underneath each opening, led to the simplification of the sills rather than the stepped pattern shown in the original openings.

The chimneys are rusticated face brick; the rusticated motif (by this time something of a Commonwealth signature) is continued along the highway frontage as a dado up to the springing points of each arch. The arches themselves have individually rusticated voussoirs and elongated or accentuated keystones, in the contemporary Edwardian Baroque manner. The sides and rear of the post office are cast as standard Federation villa elevations, with double-hung sash windows and angled fireplaces.

Other external elements include a timber-framed, skillion-roofed and enclosed (half glazed/half corrugated iron panelled) post office box alley to the rear of the site with a separate entrance; a ramp with steel balustrade to the corner porch; and a non-original timber picket fence to part of the property boundary. The post-box alley was created in the 1920s when the rear verandah was bricked in and replaced by a wall of post-boxes, sheltered under an extended verandah. A metal skillion-roof and small office addition has also been made to the east side of the former telegraph office.

The interior has undergone serial alterations over a long period. These changes have impacted on the relationship between the main postal hall and the original residence and telegraph office. However, original internal fabric remains evident throughout, including cornices and architraves, although later fabric includes joinery, suspended ceilings, partitions and new internal wall openings. The main postal space has a typical contemporary Australia Post retail fitout.

In c. 1923 the residential quarters were reduced to a single bedroom and bathroom, and the remainder of the quarters were refurbished as a mailroom and offices, supplanting the original three bedrooms and living room. This included a postmaster's administrative office and telegraph room which replaced two of the bedrooms. The kitchen became a serviced staff room and the mailroom eventually occupied the parlour. The wall dividing the postal hall and mailroom was later removed, the main counter extended and a range of alterations were made to the doors and windows. Another set of internal alterations led to a simpler division of public area and mailroom, with a new postmaster's office at the rear and internal access to the post office boxes. The staff or "welfare" room was converted into a toilet block and the lunchroom relocated to the remaining former bedroom of the old quarters. The fireplace was removed from the public hall, but all the other fireplaces remain, though blocked up. One houses a small safe.

Note that the post office boxes are housed in a separate timber-framed structure located in the northwest site corner and is clad with metal sheeting.

== Heritage listing ==
Victoria Park Post Office was listed on the Australian Commonwealth Heritage List on 22 August 2012.

Victoria Park Post Office, completed in 1913 to a design by Public Works Department Architect Hillson Beasley, and originally comprising a single-storey post office and telegraph office with quarters, is of historical and social significance. Its construction came at a time when Victoria Park had evolved as a ribbon development flanking a main road, now Albany Highway, between Perth and the town of Albany. An earlier post and telegraph office of 1898, in leased premises, was later replaced by the current building on its prominent and centrally located corner site. The generous size of the building, its rich original detailing and presentation to two streetscapes (albeit diminished by later works), and its location in an important part of the Victoria Park commercial area, all enhance these aspects of significance, as does its role as a recognisable historic public building within the townscape (criteria a and g).

Architecturally and stylistically, the post office building is significant; as a whole it remains substantially intact externally, albeit works to the building over time have had some impact. While the extension of the main building front in c. 1950 sustained the majority of original detailing, the reconfiguration of the gabled roof profile, including removal of the decorative gargoyles, roof lantern and the gable to the Albany Highway, have detracted from some of the picturesque qualities and whimsical detail of the original design. The over-painting of the exterior has also further impacted on the architectural presentation of the building. Notwithstanding this, the post office retains its rusticated piers, thickly scaled Romanesque arched openings and arcaded frontage, and deep rendered courses. The original use of gryphons, albeit removed, is also of note as these elements were rare in government buildings (criterion d).

Victoria Park Post Office is of aesthetic significance. This in part derives from its location on a prominent corner site, at the junction of Albany Highway and Duncan Street, in the commercial centre of Victoria Park suburb. The high level of visibility afforded to its historic elevations and hipped roofscape (albeit altered) also gives the building some landmark qualities. Aesthetically, the post office additionally gains value from its strong streetscape presentation which, despite the overpainting, maintains the contrast between the brick walls and rendered detailing, enhanced by the strongly modelled arched streetscape facades with rusticated piers.

The significant elements of the Victoria Park Post Office include the original 1913 building component, with integrated residence. The c. 1920s timber-framed, skillion-roofed and enclosed post office box alley to the rear is a lesser element; while the metal skillion-roof and small office addition to the east side of the former telegraph office; ramp to the corner porch; and the timber picket fence are not significant.
