= Leongatha Post Office =

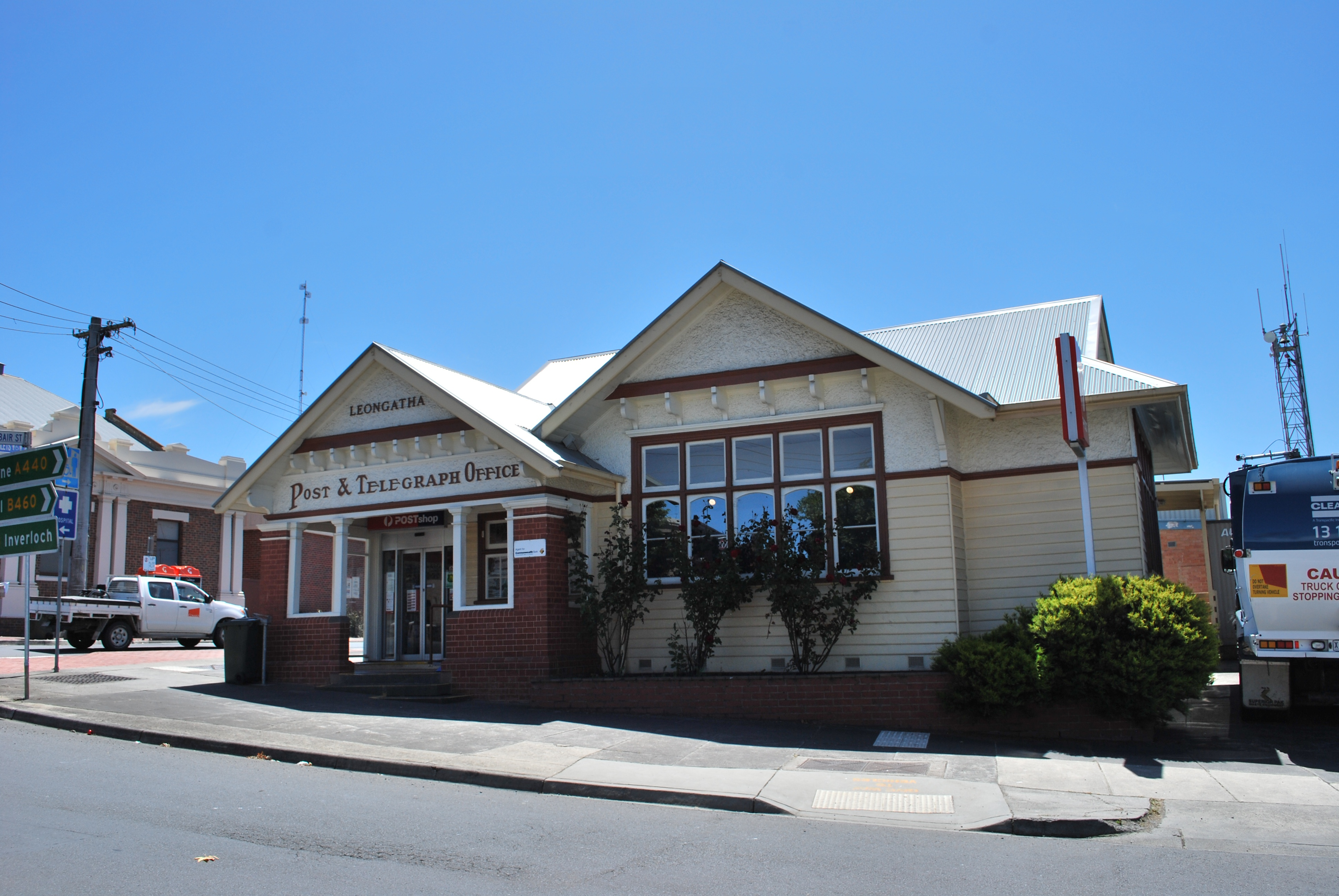

- Location within Victoria
- 38.4760°S 145.9462°E
- Location: 4 McCartin Street, Leongatha, Victoria, Australia

Commonwealth Heritage List
- Official name: Leongatha Post & Telegraph Office
- Type: Listed place (Historic)
- Designated: 22 June 2004
- Reference no.: 105640

Leongatha Post Office is a heritage-listed post office and former telegraph office at 4 McCartin Street, Leongatha, Victoria, Australia. It was designed by J. B. Cohen of the state Public Works Department for the Commonwealth Government. It was added to the Australian Commonwealth Heritage List on 22 June 2004.

== History ==
The Leongatha post office complex consists of a post and telegraph office with residence (1906); mailroom extension (1914); original telephone exchange (1930s), and later telephone exchange (1960).

Built in 1906–07, the Leongatha Post Office is axially sited at the end of Blair Street (east) in the town's commercial centre. It is sited on the most prominent intersection in town, with strong visual relationships to the courthouse (north) and Remembrance Building (south), as well as the Mechanics Institute and McCartin Hotel, also close by. The building was designed by the Victorian government on behalf of the newly-formed Commonwealth Postmaster-General's Office and built by Neil Falconer.

The Leongatha Post Office was also the last of five early post office buildings with integral residences designed by Victoria for the Commonwealth government in the 1903–1907 period, the others being Terang (1903), Sorrento (1904), Korumburra (1905) and Woodend (1905).

In 1917, a stepped timber picket fence was added along McCartin Street and north site boundary between the courthouse. The telephone exchange was introduced c. 1930s. The external paint scheme was revised c. 1940–60, and a new telephone exchange was constructed at the rear (west) of the site). After this time, the postmaster's residence was removed and the mailroom area enlarged.

In c. 1975, it underwent uniform repainting of the exterior eliminating the original contrast of the dark dado timber base. Picket fences were removed and the telephone boxes located north of the entry portico. A concrete ramp was constructed along the south side of the building to the former side verandah (now altered by the addition of post office boxes). New (metal?) lettering "Leongatha" was fixed to the entry gable and entry portico enclosed on the south side. The building was re-roofed and original decorative details, including brickwork chimneys, roof vents, finals, etc., were removed.

A rear addition to the west site boundary was completed in the 1980s, providing a staff lunchroom, toilets and plant room. The mailroom was reconfigured for sorting and deliveries. A disabled ramp was added to the alcove and internal refurbishment of the retail shop with standard Australia Post livery undertaken c. 1990.

== Description ==
Leongatha Post & Telegraph Office is at 4 McCartin Street, corner Blair Street, Leongatha. It is a one-storey building designed in the Federation style.

Leongatha Post Office is located in McCartin Street at the intersection formed by Blair and Roughead Streets with Michael Place. The building is freestanding and timber clad and is axially positioned at the end of the town's main approach road from where its hipped and gabled roof form dominates. It has a strong visual relationship to the neighbouring redbrick 1912 Leongatha Court House on the north side however their shared garden setting is diminished by the addition of utilitarian service buildings in the driveway. More broadly, while much of the town's streetscapes are modern commercial, the post office and it immediate surroundings evoke a picturesque reminder of the town's historic settlement pattern including the nearby Mechanics' Institute, McCartins Hotel and the two storey Remembrance Building and Memorial Hall on McCartin Street.

The existing building features a hipped, corrugated iron roof oriented east-west, with half-hips to the sides. The principal east street elevation has two projecting gables, both stepped and bracketed with roughcast infill. Originally studded by a series of chimney pots and vents since removed, the roof ensemble maintains its asymmetrical quality, which is emphasised by interlocking eaves and half hip gabling at the sides. The redbrick entry porch is prominent to the street corner, and its stucco gable houses an Art Nouveau stylised inscription: "Post & Telegraph Office". Underneath, the porch has redbrick piers and balustrades (originally tuck-pointed), moulded timber posts, tessellated floor tiles and bluestone steps. A concrete ramp and balustrade has been subsequently added to the entry. Along the south of the building, the roof extends down below the main pitch forming a side verandah, supported by paired and turned timber posts and believed to be the former side entry to the rear residence. Subsequently, standard metal post office boxes have been installed up to the line of the original roughcast spandrel panel, and the decorative highlights replaced with standard glazing. Around 1960, a telephone exchange was built along the west boundary and its steel-framed telecommunications tower is currently the highest element in the precinct.

In plan form, the post office retains two main sections which relate broadly to the original design for a combined post office and residence. The first of these is the front postal shop area, incorporating the alcove entry, postal hall and counters which has been enlarged by the removal of walls. Beyond this, the main transverse corridor assumed to be part of the former attached residence is evident by fragments of remaining wall sections. Generally however, the residence is gutted and the enlarged area adapted as a mail sorting and delivery area, with staff amenities and the mechanical plant room located in the west wing addition.

=== Condition and integrity ===
Typologically, the original post office combined a postmaster's residence with a postal hall, sorting room, and telegraph office. Subsequently, these key functions have been removed, concealed or altered, although changes to the interior of the building have had a lesser impact on the building's principal streetscape presentation to the east. Alterations along the south wall are more dramatic and have removed evidence of the residential entry. Internally, little or no evidence remains in plan form of the original postal hall, telegraph rooms and mail room facilities, and recent refurbishment work has included the removal or concealment of original internal fabric and the introduction of standard finishes and fittings such as carpet, office partitions, acoustic ceiling tiles and standard retail fit out joinery. Of the remnant plan form that does remain, this is likely to relate to the need to support of the roof.

Architecturally and aesthetically, acknowledging that the external volume and roof form is intact, the level of decorative detail associated with the original design has been altered considerably due to the replacement of the original roof sheeting and plumbing. Key elements which are removed or altered include the over painting of the stucco and decorative timberwork, removal of the brickwork chimneys and pots, replacement of the leadlight highlights and lower sashes with clear glass, and the replacement of the original gable barge boards, roof sheeting and rainwater guttering.

The overpainting of the building and loss of decorative detail, reduces much of the original architectural impact. Further, the additional west wing alters the rear presentation of the building and the ad hoc utilitarian structures on the building's north side intrude on the shared picturesque setting between the post office and the courthouse.

Externally and internally the building appears to be in relatively sound condition, well maintained and with no major defects visible. The roof space was not inspected and the subsequent installation of wall and ceiling linings concealed much of the structural and/or finishes. Further investigation may reveal some cracking in the rear mail area due to the substantial removal of wall areas.

== Heritage listing ==
The Leongatha Post Office has been an integral element of the town's commercial district since 1907. Designed and constructed by the Victorian government on behalf of the newly formed Commonwealth Postmaster-General's Office, it was a strong early symbol of Federation in Victoria. It was also a significant emblem of Federation to the Leongatha community, post offices being among the few physical manifestations of Federation in the local context in the early 1900s. The Leongatha Post Office was the last of five early post office buildings constructed by Victoria for the Commonwealth government in the 1903–1907 period, the others being Terang (1903), Sorrento (1904), Korumburra (1905) and Woodend (1905). The Post Office has been an important element of the infrastructure of Leongatha, a major commercial centre of South Gippsland since 1907. It is sited on the most prominent intersection in the town, with strong visual relationships to other historic buildings in the commercial centre. It also displays the primary characteristics of a range of federation post office designs produced by Victoria's Public Works Department in the late 19th/early 20th Century period. Leongatha Post Office is of social significance to the South Gippsland community, as a place of local gathering and social connections during an important phase in the development of Leongatha when postal business was the principal form of communication.

The curtilage includes the title block/allotment of the property.

The significant components of Leongatha Post Office include the main postal building constructed in 1906–07. The mailroom extension of 1914 is of contributory significance. The staff lunchroom, toilets and plant room constructed in the 1980s, shed and disabled access ramp are not significant. The adjacent telephone exchange is also not significant.
