= Perth Water =

Body of water of Swan River, Western Australia

Coordinates: 31°57′58″S 115°51′43″E

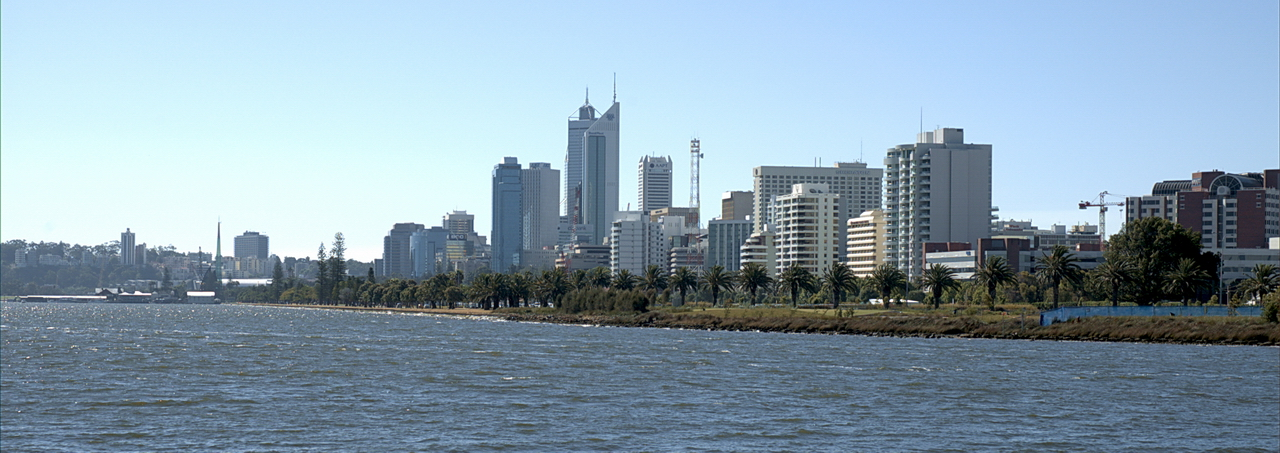
Perth Water, viewed from Heirisson Island in 2005

Perth Water is a section of the Swan River on the southern edge of the central business district of Perth, Western Australia. It is between the Causeway to the east, and Narrows Bridge to the west – a large wide but shallow section of river, and the northern edge of the suburb South Perth. Perth Water is considered a tourist attraction, and a landmark of the City of Perth.

== History ==
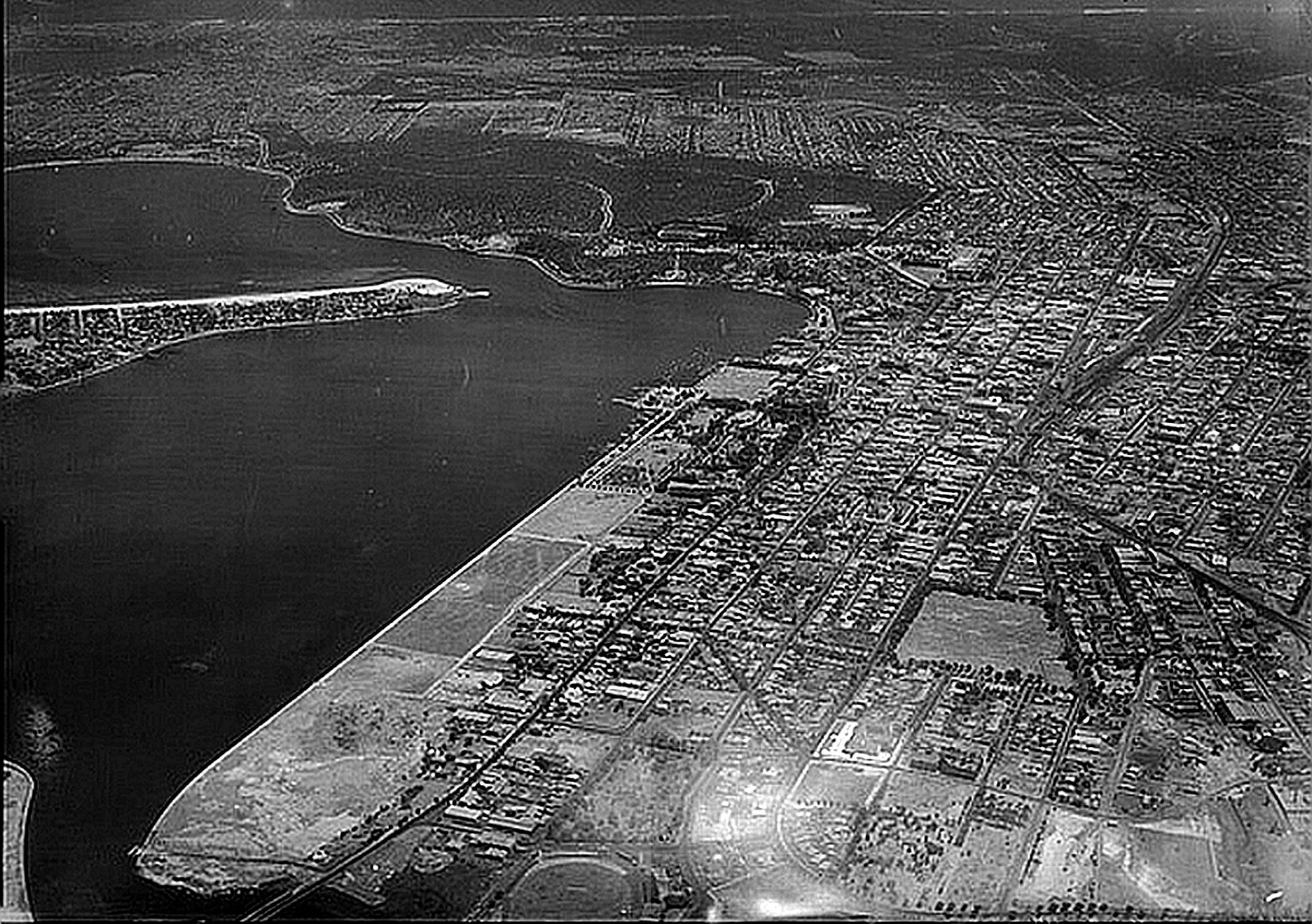
Aerial view looking west across Perth c. 1930

The northern shore, specifically the area around Point Fraser, is traditionally known to the Whadjuk Noongar people as Boodjargabbeelup.

Historically it was much larger in size. The shorelines have been regularly changed.

Considerable reclamation has taken place on both sides of the river. For example, in 1879, landfill of Perth Water was used to create The Esplanade.

== Narrows bridge reclamation ==
For the construction of the Narrows Bridge and its approaches, considerable amounts of the north west section of Perth Water were reclaimed. In the early days of the settlement of Perth the north west section between Mount Eliza and the city had been named Mounts Bay, and the road along the shore became known as Mounts Bay Road. The subsequent reclamation effectively removed what has been known as Mounts Bay.

The former river bank in that area is equivalent to the edge of Mounts Bay Road. The whole Perth Convention and Exhibition Centre lies on the river side of the former river bank.

== Events ==
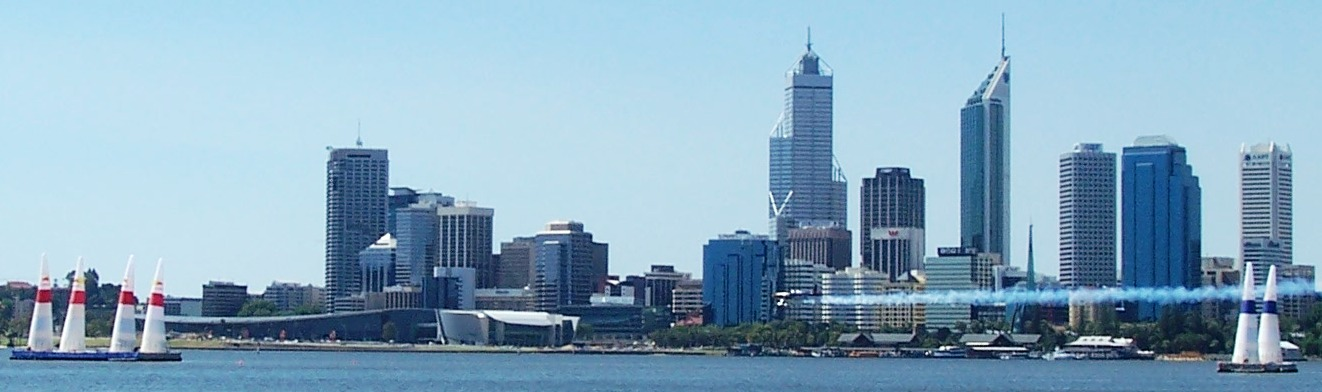
The Perth leg of the Red Bull Air Race World Series 2006

In 2006, the last race in the Red Bull Air Race World Series was the first held in Australia, and was held in Perth, with the competition being centred over Perth Water.

It has been the annual site of Australia Day City of Perth Skyworks, with crowds lining the lawns and open space along the foreshores. A good view for these activities has been from Kings Park due to its elevation and position looking across the Perth Water area. Post-cards, calendar images, posters and photographs from most decades of the twentieth century exist, that show the view from the Park looking across Perth Water to the city.

== Uses ==
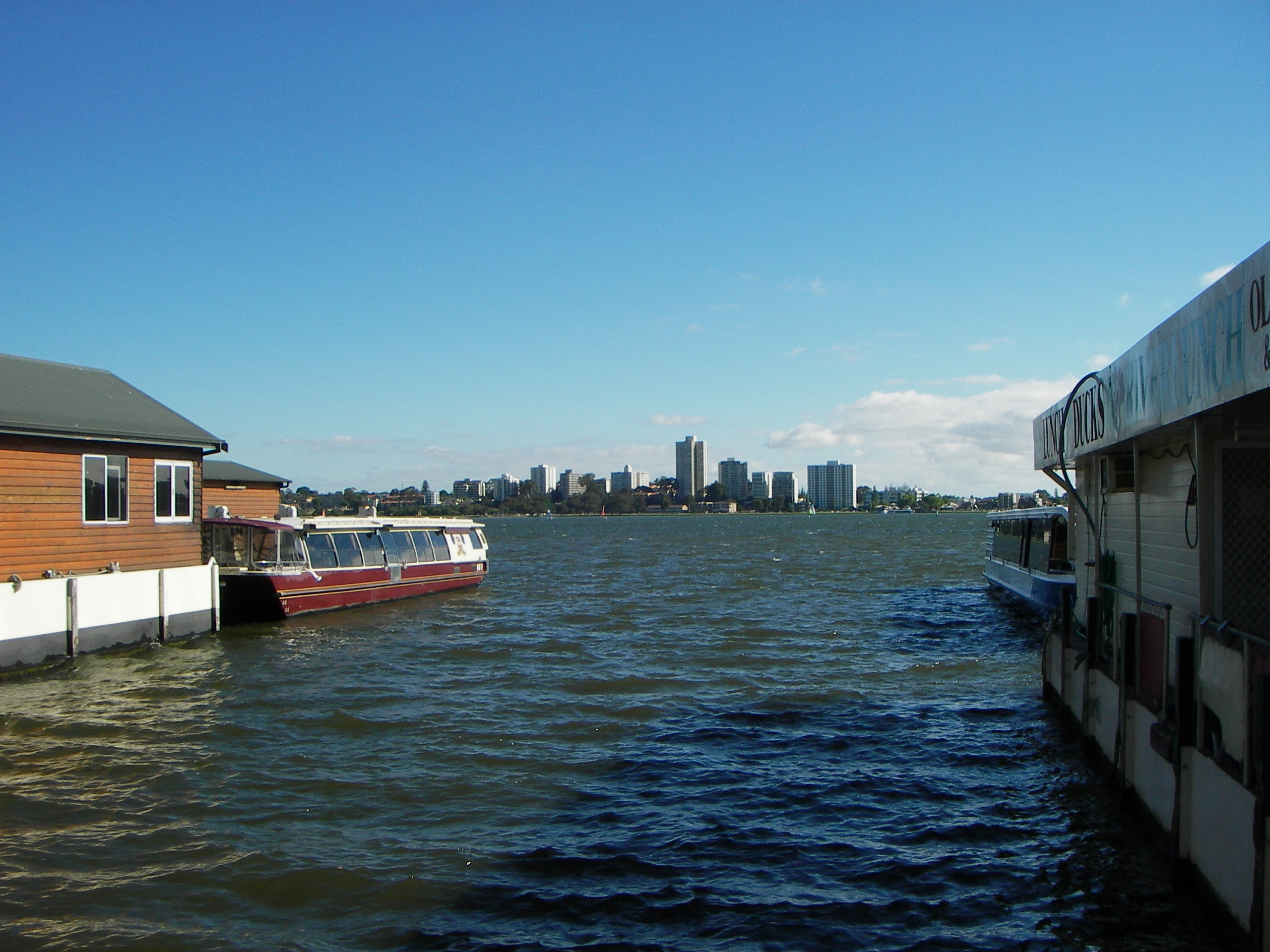
Barrack Square moorings, Perth Water

Since the establishment of Perth, there have been either jetties or landing and mooring facilities at the location of Barrack Square at Barrack Street Jetty. The Transperth ferry service travels between Elizabeth Quay and Mends Street in South Perth. Commercial companies also use the jetties for trips to Rottnest Island via Fremantle, and Swan River wine and leisure cruises.

Ferry companies at the terminal have improved re-fuelling techniques to reduce the amount of oil pollution in Perth Water.

== Historical photos ==
The West Australian newspaper produced a book for the 150th anniversary of Western Australia in 1979 that included photographs showing the degradation of the space over time.

== Early maps ==
In the 1950–1951 Lord Mayor's report for the City of Perth an early map of Perth from 1838 was reproduced.

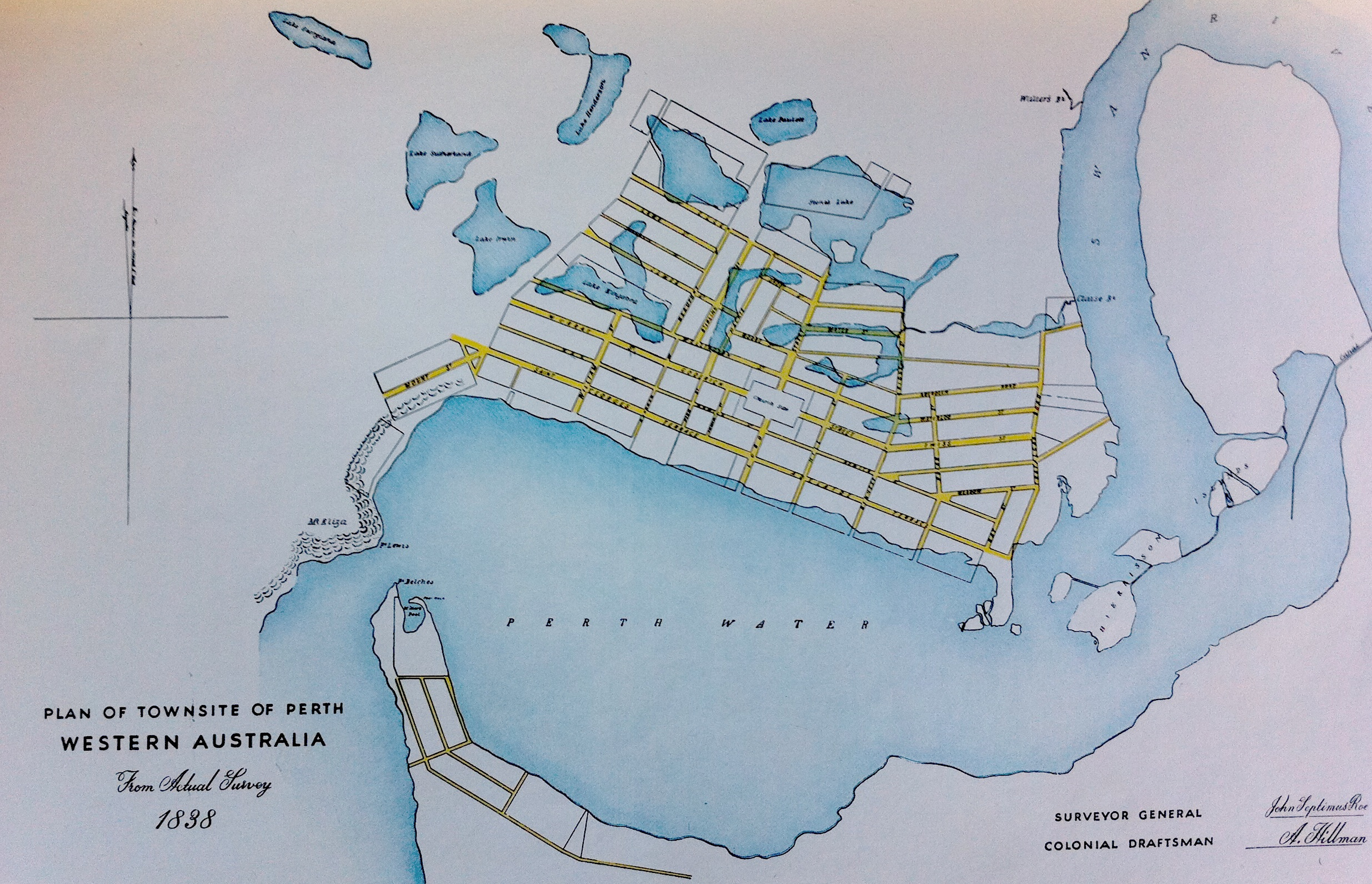
Perth Water 1838 map reproduction

== Indigenous names ==
In 1989, the Department of Aboriginal Sites published a book with a reproduction of a 1909 cancelled plan of Perth that shows place names:

- Perth Water – Buneenboro
- Mends Street Jetty – Goorgoogoo
- Sir James Mitchell Park, South Perth foreshore – Gabudjulup
- Riverside Drive (then shallow waters east of Government House) – Gabbee darbul
- Point Belches (south east side of Narrows Bridge area) – Gareenup

This body of water is also known as Derbarl Yerrigan, a name which has since been adopted for the whole of the Swan River. In the Noongar language, Derbarl refers to the estuary water and Yerrigan is "rising up".

== Mounts Bay Road – Esplanade river edge ==
The earlier shore line of Perth Water can be identified by the line made by Mounts Bay Road, and its extension to The Esplanade.

From some earlier photographs and images made from Kings Park it is possible to ascertain the earlier river-edges, or banks, from tree lines. The photo here is of the part of the river that was filled in to accommodate the Narrows Bridge works.

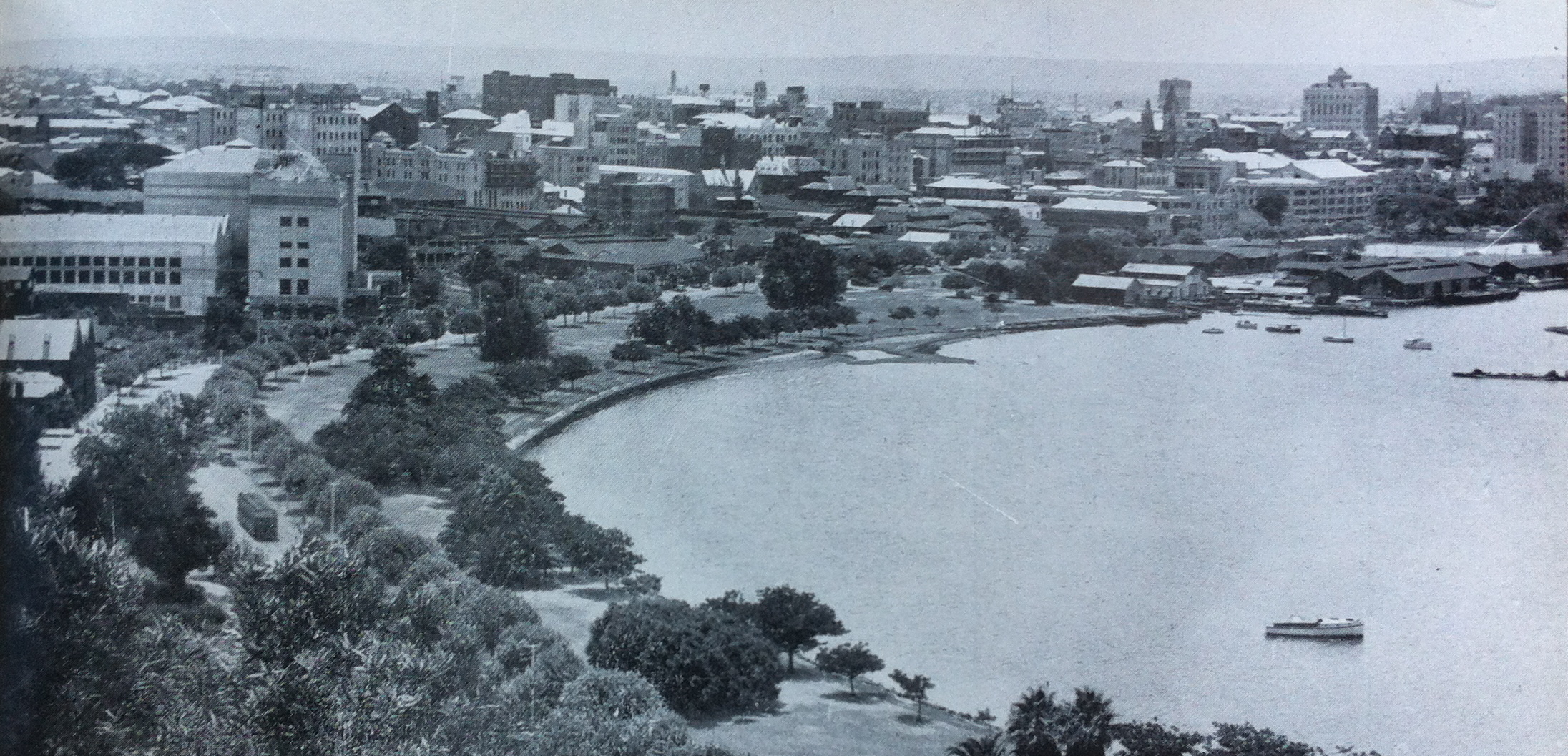
Mounts Bay Road and Perth Water, 1947 photograph from Kings Park

== Navigable channel ==
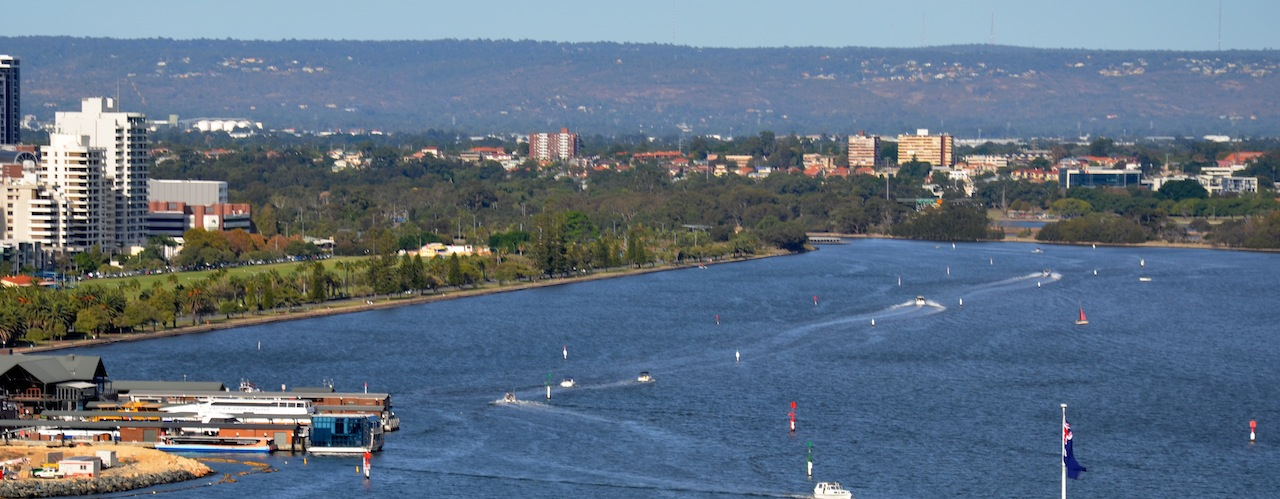
Perth Water in 2015 from Kings Park, showing the navigable channel close to the north shore

The main route for deep draught boats to navigate Perth Water is from the Narrows Bridge to Barrack Street Jetty, then following a channel close to the north shore parallel to Riverside Drive.

The channel was dredged from as early as 1908 to keep the South Perth to Perth ferry channel clear; such maintenance is an ongoing issue.

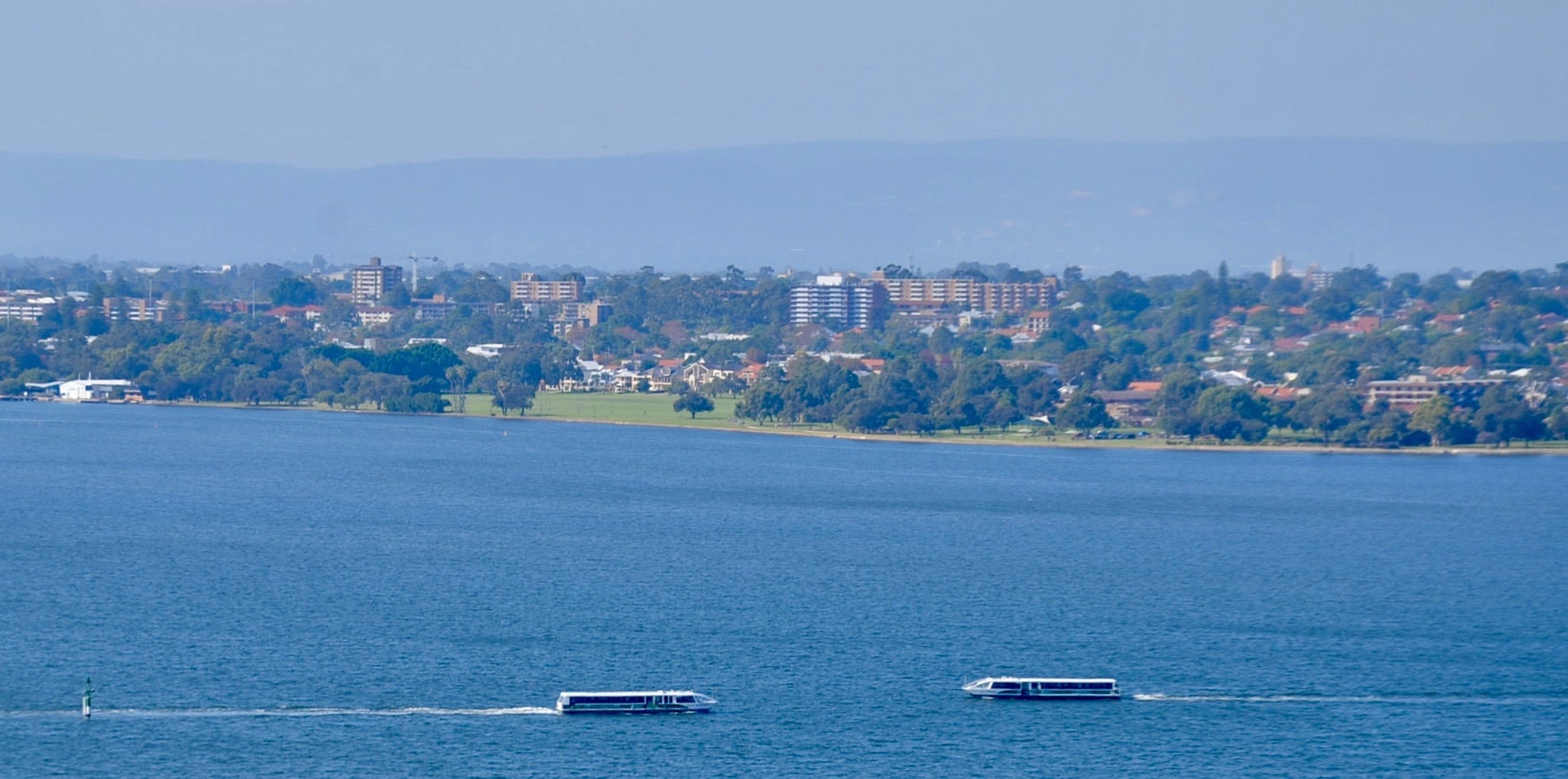
Ferries between Elizabeth Quay and Mends Street about to pass each other in May 2018

== See also ==
- Melville Water
- Perth waterfront development proposals
- The Esplanade (Perth)
- Elizabeth Quay
- Islands of Perth, Western Australia
