= South Perth Post Office =

Heritage-listed post office in South Perth, Western Australia

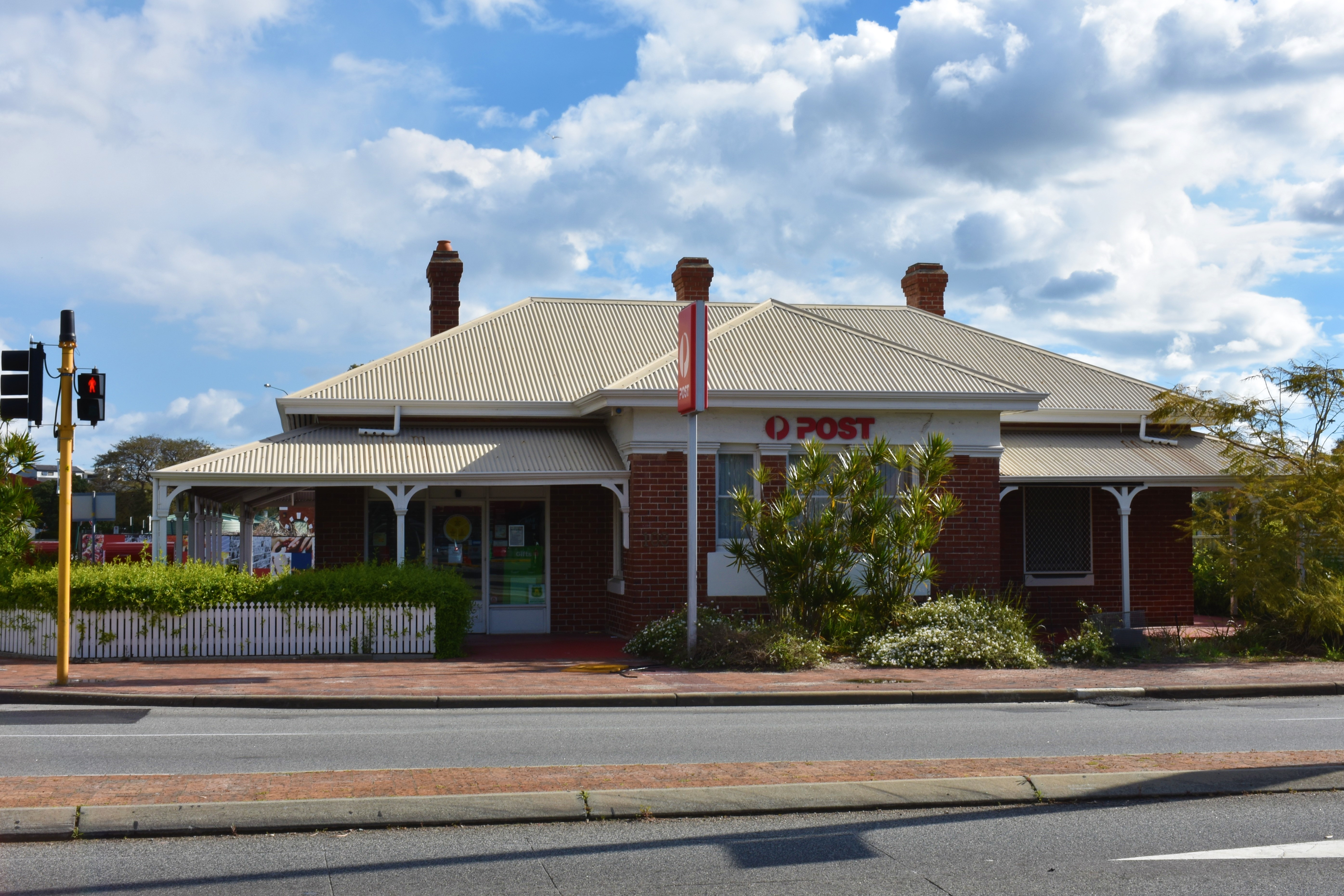

- Location within Western Australia
- Mends Street Jetty is about 300 m (980 ft) northeast, and Perth Zoo is about 200 m (660 ft) southeast of the post office.
- 31.973196°S 115.851686°E
- Location: 103 Mill Point Road, South Perth, Western Australia, Australia

Site notes
- Area: 1,000 m^{2} (10,768 sq ft)

Commonwealth Heritage List
- Official name: South Perth Post Office
- Type: Listed place (Historic)
- Designated: 8 November 2011
- Reference no.: 105370

South Perth Post Office is a heritage-listed post office at 103 Mill Point Road, South Perth, Western Australia, Australia. It was added to the Australian Commonwealth Heritage List on 8 November 2011. The post office is located on the Mill Point peninsula.

== History ==
Prior to the turn of the century, following the gold rush, there was a need for recreational facilities in the environs of Perth. One such facility eventuating was the precinct comprising the Zoological Gardens and the Mineral Baths in South Perth, commenced in 1898. Up until September 1901, it is recorded that 176,800 people had visited the Zoological Gardens within three years of its opening. South Perth is relatively close to Perth by ferry; by horse and cart, at that time, it was quite a long journey. Part of the enjoyment of a trip to the Zoo was the ferry crossing to Mends Street Jetty. An interchange at the jetty end of the street connected with the tram route which passed the gates of the Zoo on its return to Perth. Many people chose to walk the short distance along Mends Street. Businesses housed in buildings, some of which survive, flourished until the gold boom subsided. The post office is one of these buildings in Mends Street. The terminus of the ferry service continued to provide the impetus to development of this section of South Perth even after the bridging of the Swan River at the Narrows in the 1950s. Thriving commercial buildings have been added to the residential nature of the district. The environs of the Mends Street precinct provided fertile ground for testing changes to the residential planning codes, with resulting substantial increases in residential density evident today.

Prior to Federation, the State Government was responsible for the operation of the postal service in Western Australia. By 1898, the district became eligible for a post and telegraph office. This was operated by Theresa O'Dea, the first post mistress, from a room located at the foot of the stairs in the Windsor Hotel, then operated by the Strickland family. At that time about fifty letters a day were delivered and three letter boxes had to be cleared. The building from which this service was conducted still exists, diagonally opposite the current building.

In 1900, a site on the western corner of Mill Point Road, then known as Suburban Road, was set aside. In June, a contract was awarded to F. S. Warner for £939. The total cost of the facility was £1,764 when completed in 1901, equivalent to A$303,881 in 2022, and included quarters for the post mistress, by then, Miss J. Benson. Responsibility for providing the post office buildings until 1901 also rested with the Government of Western Australia. Accordingly, the design and construction was undertaken by the Public Works Department (PWD). A common practice, following re-organisation of the Department in 1897, was to facilitate the works by adapting a standard design as necessary, with a site plan specifically addressing the site conditions. There is evidence that this practice was adopted in the case of the South Perth Post Office and Quarters. The standard design apparently adopted for this purpose was PWD Standard Plan Class D. Modifications probably included the substitution of the operating room for a bedroom, with the internal kitchen, pantry and laundry added at the rear. Warwick Broomfield, a reviewer of post office plans in Western Australia suggests: "a sheet showing a standard design which is similar to South Perth is ascribed to Hardwick in 1897." The design style is best categorised as a very simple form of federation bungalow as described in, but with no outstanding design elements evident. At present, the location of other buildings to the same or similar plan is not known. In 1900, J. H. Grainger was the Principal Architect, with Hillson Beasley his Chief Draughtsman. Beasley signed the site plan on 11 April 1900.

On 1 May 1905, the status of the Post and Telegraph Office was amended to an Allowance Office and, in 1911, to Official. In 1937, the building had a low open picket fence and an enclosed verandah on the Quarters side. The Post Office was renamed Mends Street in 1939 with reversion of its status to an Allowance Office in 1941 and back to Official in 1948. The name was again changed to South Perth in 1982. To some extent, these changes reflect the perception and actuality of the focus of the district resulting from the major changes inflicted on the character of this section of South Perth by the bridging of the Swan River at the Narrows in the 1950s.

The rear southeast section was rebuilt and further additions on the northwest side added at an unknown date. The additions comprise face red brickwork with rendered cement sills to match the original details although a change in the coursework mortar is evident.

Outbuildings in the rear yard were removed or replaced in 1981, and the area asphalted and planted for public and staff carparking. In 1995–1996, general external and internal works associated with the building's refurbishment were undertaken. It is likely that the original (east) side vestibule entry to the former residence was removed at this time although the arched opening and door and toplight joinery remain. All telephone and telegraph functions have been removed.

Externally, perimeter garden areas and a picket fence were re-instated around 2005 and the roof sheeting and rainwater goods replaced resulting in the building's "over-restored appearance". The northwest verandah was enclosure removed and restored, and a new verandah, matching the original in detail, extended around the three sides of the southeast wing. Various windows and door openings have been reinstated; two openings centred in the rear (south) wall have been bricked-in. An automatic sliding entry door has been installed in the northeast corner of the building and the original (east) side entry to the postal hall replaced by a window. Post office boxes have been installed in two original extant openings along the east verandah (one opening has been widened) as well as to the three walls of the southeast rear wing.

Internally, walls formerly marking the central postal hall have been removed and the roof structure supported by steel I-beams. Subsequently, the enlarged shop area has been refurbished with standard Australia Post retail livery. Access to the central double corridor from the side (east) has been infilled and painted but retains its facebrick arched opening with brick voissoirs. In general, floors and ceilings have been re-lined, and conventional shelving, fluorescent lights and window coverings installed, as well as mechanical ducting, plasterboard partition walls and built in joinery.

== Description ==
South Perth Post Office is located on a busy street intersection formed by Mill Point Road (formerly Suburban Road) and Mends Street, in the Mill Point area of South Perth. Mends Street was the early business centre of South Perth with the Zoological Gardens and Mineral Baths (both 1898) nearby.

The building is located on what has grown into a strategic intersection taking considerable suburban traffic from the south-eastern suburbs onto the Narrows Bridge and the Mitchell Freeway in one direction. Across this, the Mends Street Precinct, a district commercial centre leads in a north-easterly direction towards the open space of the recreation reserve along the Swan River foreshore, with the river and the Perth City skyline in the background. In the other direction Mends Street terminates in Labouchere Road, with the generally open space against the fence and verdant backdrop of the Zoological Gardens. Along Mends Street, a number of buildings of heritage significance dictate the pace and character of what is perceived as a precinct with some modern infill. It is one of a group of heritage buildings in the vicinity including the Old Mill Theatre, Heritage House Cultural Centre, the Police Station and the Windsor Hotel. The collection of brickwork buildings are freestanding with garden surrounds and this aspect emphasises their nineteenth century setting, albeit within a dense commercial strip and with a large service station across the road.

South Perth Post Office is a simple building executed in a domestic scale, originally, with attached Quarters. It is red brick and had a galvanised corrugated iron roof and timber joinery. A number of fireplaces internally were served by brick chimneys with rendered detail. The masonry generally is face brick with render extending several courses down. The head of the former entrance on the south-east elevation is a round arch formed with red brick voussoirs. Comparison of the original site plan with the extant fabric indicates the loss of outbuildings and street fences, the enclosure of the north-west verandah, brick additions on the south-west corner and the loss of the telephone cabinet under the verandah. New telephone cabinets conceal the original verandah to some extent, with its bracketed posts at its most important visual point, the street corner. A number of alterations have been made to the building in the intervening period, generally reflecting the changes in the postal and telegraph service and the separation of Telecom from Australia Post. The major events in this generally common sequence were the demise of telegram services and phone exchanges with their infrastructure. A major maintenance of the building was undertaken in 1981 and the back garden was bitumen paved as part of a wider communal car park. The building, along with a number of other post offices, is currently undergoing further extension to provide, among other things, an increased number of post boxes again.

The post office presents as a single-storey bungalow-roofed building. The Mill Point Road elevation is symmetrical with a wraparound verandah centrally punctuated by a projecting wing corresponding to the former postal hall. Freestanding, the building frontage is landscaped with cottage-style gardens; asphalted carparks and planting is provided along Mends Street and at the rear of the site. The post office and quarters design is executed in a domestic scale with a degree of contrast provided by the face brick red walls and whited painted rendered frieze. This aspect is further accentuated by the lightweight encircling verandah timberwork, painted white. Tall red brick chimneys stud the white colorbond hipped and gabled roof.

In plan form, the post office retains two main sections which relate broadly to the original design for a combined post office and residence. The first of these is the front postal shop area, incorporating the entry, postal hall and counters which has been enlarged by the removal of the central walls and the installation of steel roof supports. Further to this, the main transverse corridor (assumed to be part of the former attached residence) provides additional counter service area for the retail shop. The areas and rooms behind the corridor have been adapted for as a staffroom, lockers, toilets, offices, mail sorting, delivery and storage areas.

== Condition and integrity ==
The South Perth Post Office has undergone another major refurbishment and extension. The character of the lean-to roofed wing in the southern corner of the building has been converted by extending the hipped form of the main roof over this section. The verandahs have been extended to wrap around the former lean-to and large openings have been inserted into the walls to provide space for more post boxes. Very little of the original red brick fabric (the solid) remains. There are no voids left in this important street elevation, thus the solid void ratio and the rhythm of the masonry patterns, so important to the residential ambience of buildings in the streetscape is no longer evident. The roof has been re-sheeted with long lengths of colour bonded corrugated zincalume, a material which imparts an over restored appearance to this building. The softer visual quality of the original galvanised corrugated iron with its characteristic sheet joints and less prominent fixings is lost. The chimneys and the verandah timbers (with bracketed posts) are virtually the only remnant original fabric and as such do provide a clue as to the provenance of the post office. With internal changes to wall layout, however, no clues of the internal fabric including cornices and joinery remain.

Externally, the building's ability to demonstrate its original form is relatively good with minor alteration owing to the rear additions. As noted above, the southeast wing is an addition, although a similar plan form appears on the 1900 PWD site plan. The recladding of the roof in white colorbond has altered the appearance of the building and presents the roof in strong contrast to the red brickwork below. Evidence of the former side entry to the attached residence is illegible and the composite nature of the building is confused by the extension of the verandah along the length of the east facade.

Internally, the plan form of the original building is complicated by layers of alterations which have been made incrementally over 100 years. This includes the removal of masonry walls to the former postal hall, the installation of new openings, widening existing openings, reinstating old openings and the installation of new partition walls. Original fabric is evident in discreet areas such as the placement of fireplaces, remnant rendered masonry walls, timber skirtings, doors, cornices and arched openings within the former transverse corridor. But in general, the legibility of the original interior configuration and fabric it is incoherent and piecemeal. While the former centrally projecting postal hall has some interpretation externally, this is not the case internally, where it has been enlarged and refurbished to standard Australia Post retail design.

Externally and internally the building appears to be in relatively sound condition, well maintained and with no major defects visible. The roof space was not inspected although the building's poor insulative performance was highlighted on the 43 °C (109 °F) day when it was inspected. Generally, the provision of mechanical services is uncoordinated and has resulted in a gang of service units located along the west external wall. Some ceiling cracking was evident in the rear mail area which may relate to the removal of walls.

== Heritage listing ==
The South Perth Post Office, constructed in 1901, is located in the early business centre of South Perth and in the vicinity of other significant historic public buildings. Its historical importance, however, can be attributed to it likely being the first post office completed in Western Australia after the federation of the Australian colonies in January 1901, albeit under the aegis of the state government architects John Grainger (Chief Architect of the PWD) and Hillson Beasley (Chief Draughtsman) of the Public Works Department. It also therefore represents one of the very early contributions of the Western Australian government to the fledgling Commonwealth. South Perth Post Office is also of aesthetic significance due to being one of an important group of heritage buildings including the Old Mill Theatre, Heritage House Cultural Centre, the Police Station and the Windsor Hotel, located on a large street intersection formed by Mill Point Road and Mends Street. The ensemble of buildings and their garden surrounds, as a whole, form an important group with aesthetic characteristics, particularly in the context of the associated dense commercial strip.

== General references ==
- National Trust of Australia (WA) Assessment. July 1993.
- Pope, B.; Bush, F.; Broomfield, W.; Kelsall, D. (1993). Historical and Architectural Assessment of Post Offices in Western Australia owned by Australia Post as at 21 July 1991 (Report). NEGP. National Trust of Australia (WA).
- Twentieth Century Impressions of Western Australia. Perth: P W H Thiel & Co. 1901.
- Public Works Department Contract Book 1.
- A Pictorial Guide to Identifying Australian Architecture.
- Fiddian, Marc (1989). Six Stamps, Please: a Tableau of Australian Post Offices. Pakenham, Victoria: Pakenham Gazette. pp. 70, 73. ISBN 0-9596-3169-0.
- Warmington, GS; Ward, AC (1993). Australia Post Survey of Historic Properties in Western Australia.
- ID 105370. Commonwealth Heritage List.
- ID 18172. Register of the National Estate.
- Savills (June 2005). APPD Property Valuation Report (Report).
- Municipal Heritage Inventory (Report). South Perth Heritage Trail information. 2000.
