= Peter Belches =

Scottish explorer in Western Australia (1796–1890)

Commander Peter Belches RN (1796–1890) was an early explorer in Western Australia.

Born in Edinburgh, Scotland in 1796, Belches joined the Royal Navy on 2 February 1812. In March 1814, whilst serving on board Primrose, he was injured in a friendly-fire battle with Marlborough. He was an officer on Volage in December 1826, when it was anchored in Sydney Harbour along with Warspite under James Brisbane and Success under James Stirling. When Brisbane died on 19 December, Stirling made a number of promotions and re-appointments to cover for his loss. In the process, Belches was promoted to Third Lieutenant on Success in April 1827.

In March 1827, Success arrived off the coast of the Swan River in what is now Western Australia to undertake an exploration expedition which aimed to determine the suitability of the area for establishing a British colony. After examining the coastal waters of the area, an 18-man land party was formed to explore up the river. As a member of the party, Belches traversed the Swan River up to its junction with Ellen Brook. At the location now known as the Narrows, Stirling named a peninsula on the southern side of the Swan River Point Belches in Belches' honour.

At the junction of Ellen Brook, Stirling split the party into three groups, sending Belches and George Heathcote to explore to the north, where they found a fresh water lake. After returning to the junction of the Canning River, Stirling sent Belches to explore it. Belches traced the Canning for 32 kilometres (20 mi), returning after two days to report that it was a fresh water river "similar in every respect" to the Swan River.

After returning to the ship, the crew sailed north for a distance, then southwards to Geographe Bay, when Belches reported finding "a source large enough to be called a river, gushing from the side of the Solid Limestone Rock and rushing to the Sea half a mile [800 m] distant with a considerable noise."

The Swan River Colony was formed in 1829, and by the end of 1831 had expanded to become the British settlement of Western Australia. In 1834, Belches emigrated to the colony on James Patterson. He took up land at Albany, where there was already a large Scottish community. He served as Albany's harbour master from 1834 until 1837 and was appointed as magistrate for the District of Plantagenet in 1836. In 1840, he entered into a land partnership with George Cheyne, and in 1852, the pair prospected for gold together in the Stirling Range. Belches left the colony in 1858, retired in 1864, attained the rank of commander on 20 May 1877 and died in 1890.
