= Old Mill, Perth =

Mill and museum in South Perth, Western Australia

Old Mill
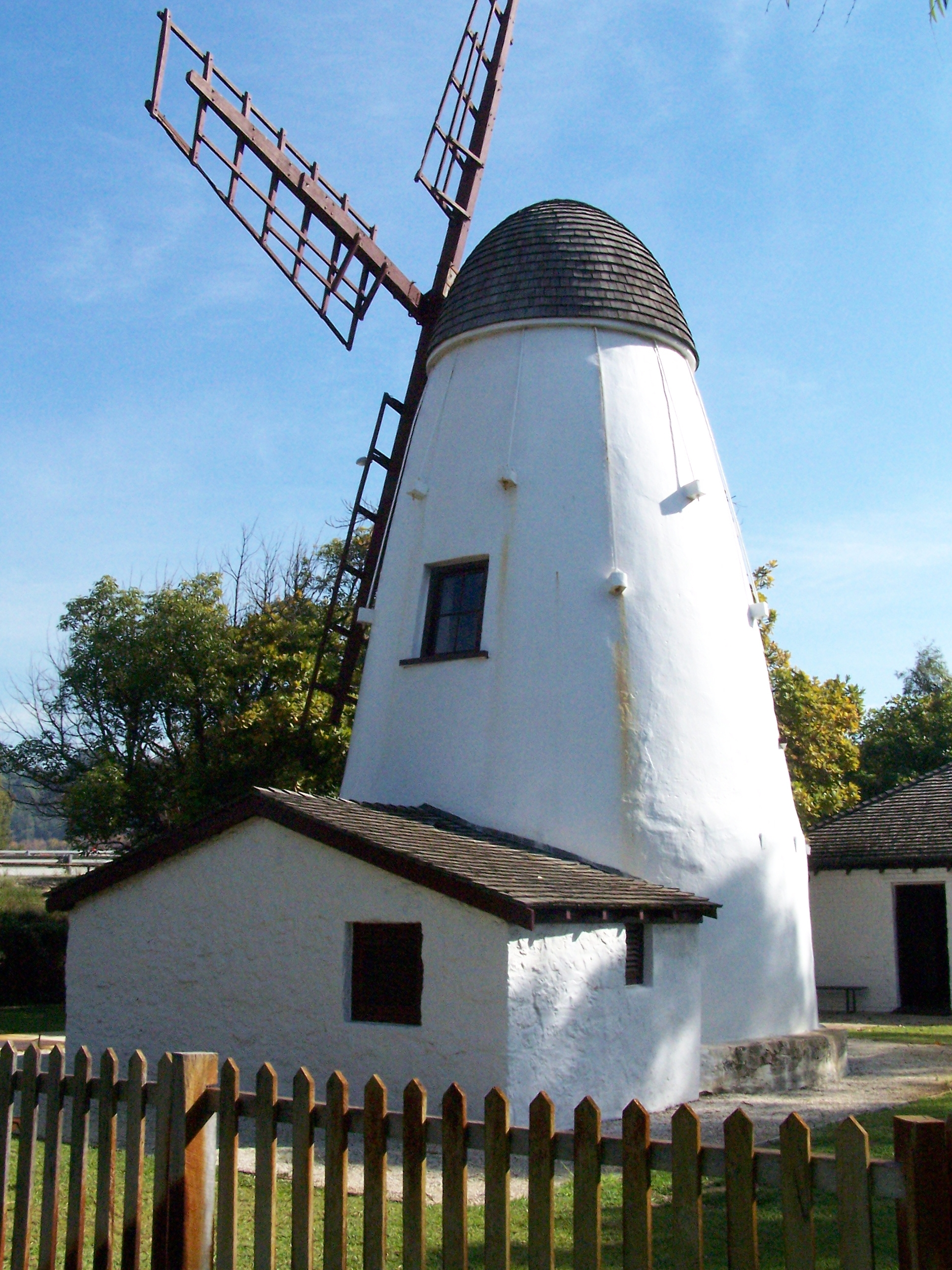
- Old Mill buildings
- Interactive map of Old Mill

Origin
- Mill name: Old Mill; Shenton's Mill
- Mill location: Perth, Western Australia
- Coordinates: 31°57′58″S 115°50′49″E
- Operator: National Trust of Australia
- Year built: 1835; 191 years ago

Information
- Purpose: Corn mill
- Type: Tower mill
- Storeys: Three storeys
- No. of sails: Four sails
- Type of sails: Common sails
- Other information

Western Australia Heritage Register
- Type: State Registered Place
- Designated: 2 July 1993
- Reference no.: 2394

The Old Mill (Shenton's Mill) is a restored tower mill located on Mill Point in South Perth, Western Australia. Today, restored to its original 1830s condition, it is Perth's oldest surviving colonial structure.

== History ==
The windmill was commissioned by William Kernot Shenton, on a foundation stone laid by Governor James Stirling in 1835. The original mill, the colony's first wind-powered industry, was built by Paul and James Lockyer and operated by William Steele. Peak production was 680 kilograms (1,500 lb) of flour per day. Operation ceased in 1859, due to unprofitability and the unsuitable location. The 4.1-tonne (9,000-pound) cogwheels were hewn from a nearby tree known as tuart, the highly valued species Eucalyptus gomphocephala.

The site was located near the earliest housing and agriculture of the colony, and was used for industry before being adapted to commercial, then residential, purposes. In 1880, an engineer known as "Satan" Browne established a dance hall and hotel known as Alta Gardens. The alterations by Browne remained, although the venture was a failure, and it found use as a chicken run and house instead. The address of the site is now listed as Mill Point Road, South Perth.

In 1957, the proposed route of the Narrows Bridge was deviated to preserve the site, after a campaign by public officials, and a folk museum was established on the grounds.

The site was received by the City of South Perth, repaired and upgraded and was placed on the register of the National Trust in 1992. The buildings and site is noted as having permanent entry on heritage registers for its architectural and historical significance, and conservation "for their own sake, and as a museum, is important".
