= Point Belches =

Point into Swan River, Western Australia

Coordinates: 31°57′58″S 115°50′59″E

Today Point Belches refers to a small feature on the eastern side of the peninsula now commonly referred to as Mill Point.

Point Belches is a small point on the south side of Swan River, Western Australia, about 250 metres (820 ft) east of the Narrows within the area known as Perth Water. The land is part of the South Perth Esplanade, and the water off the point is used as a commercial water skiing area.

Captain James Stirling discovered Point Belches during the Swan River expedition of 1827. He named it in honour of Peter Belches, a member of the exploring party who was Third Lieutenant on Stirling's ship, HMS Success.

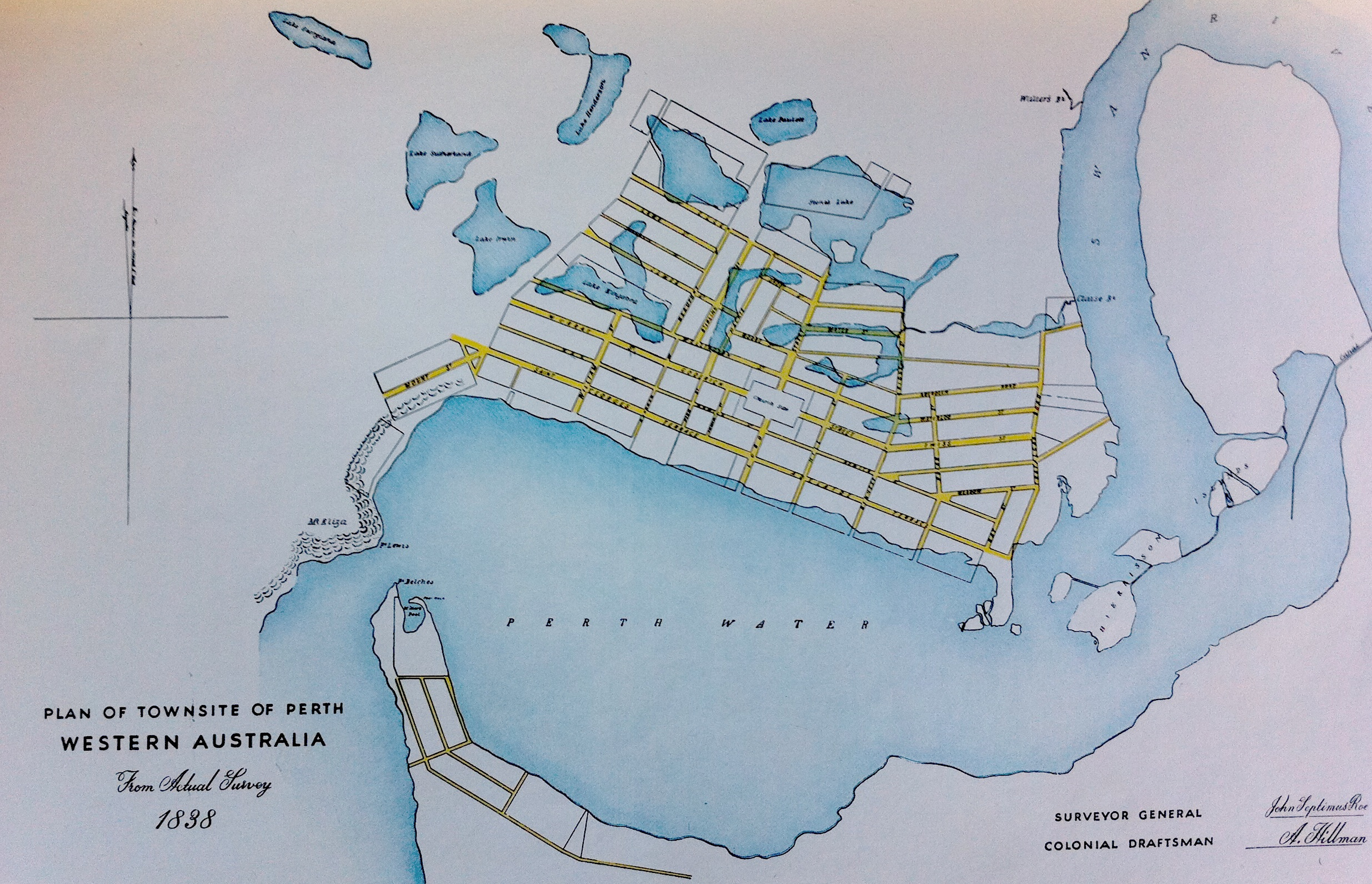
Plan of Perth townsite from 1838 showing Point Belches situated north of Miller's Pool, opposite Point Lewis

While Point Belches now refers to a small feature on the eastern side of the peninsula, Stirling almost certainly intended the name to refer to the entire peninsula. The Old Mill on the peninsula is identified in early sources as being on Point Belches. Furthermore, historic plans mark Point Belches north of Miller's Pool on the opposite side of Pool Neck to its contemporary location east of Miller's Pool.

It was a stopping point for early ferries on Perth Water. The peninsula itself is now commonly referred to as Mill Point, although strictly speaking this name also refers to a smaller feature, on the western side of the peninsula.

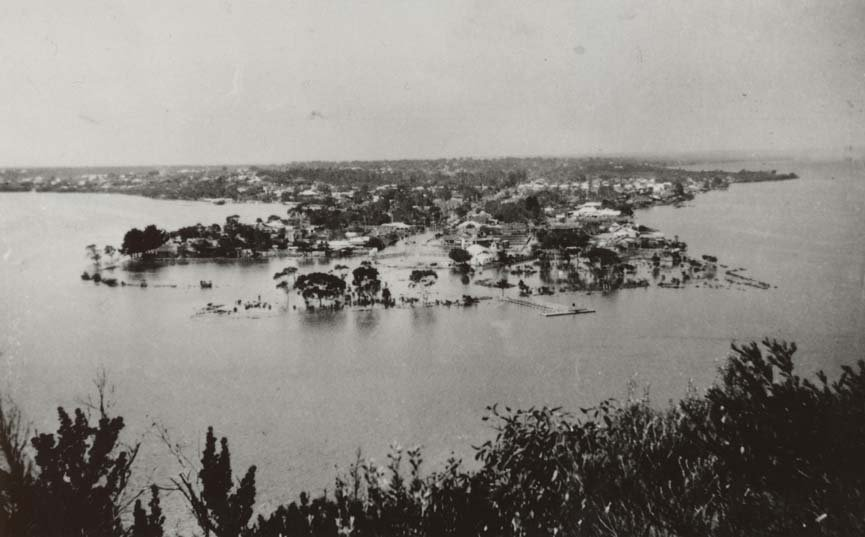
The peninsula during the 1926 floods. Miller's Pool is just left from the centre of the image.
