= Sir James Mitchell Park =

Park in South Perth, Western Australia

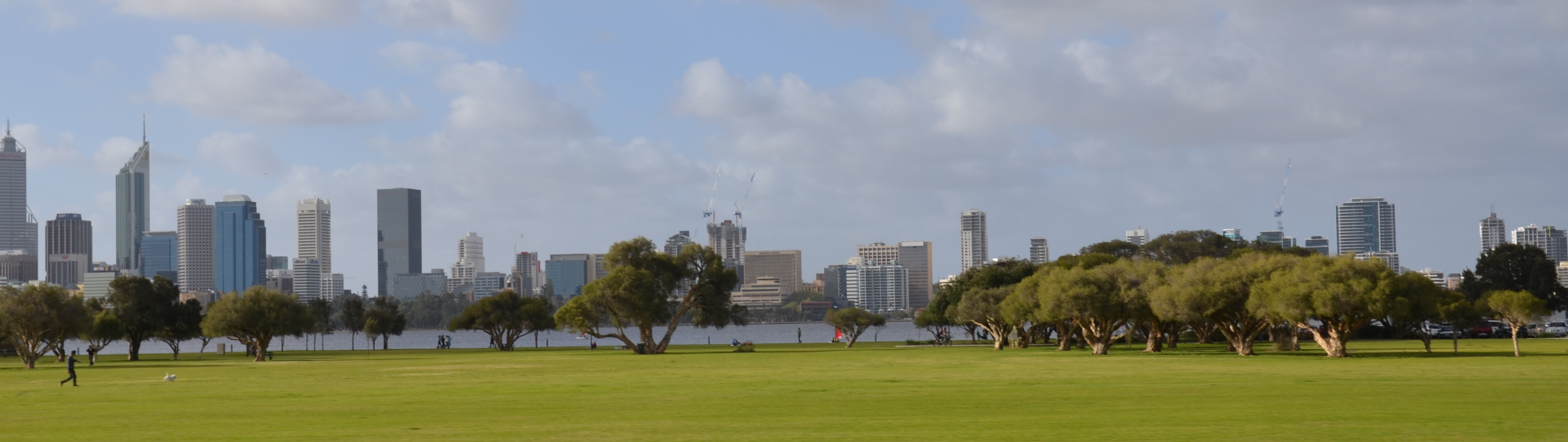
- Sir James Mitchell Park from Mill Point Road
- Interactive map of Sir James Mitchell Park
- Location: South Perth, Western Australia
- Coordinates: 31°58′34″S 115°51′54″E
- Area: 65 ha (160 acres)
- Opened: 1961
- Administrator: City of South Perth
- Status: Open

Sir James Mitchell Park is a park along the southern foreshore of Perth Water in Perth, Western Australia. It lies within the suburb of South Perth from Mends Street Jetty, to just south of Heirisson Island.

It is named after Sir James Mitchell, the 13th Premier of Western Australia

It was formerly a riverside area with a number of issues regarding management. In the 1950s market gardens were closed in the area.

Since the 1970s considerable effort has been made to improve amenity, access and environmental issues.

The South Perth City Council considers the park, or parts of it to be suitable for hire, and it has hosted numerous events since its improvements and landscaping.

As of December 2015 it is a very regularly used location for cyclists, runners and dog walkers around the river, with links to a circuit that continues around the whole of Perth Water, utilising pedestrian facilities on the Narrows Bridge and The Causeway.
