= South Perth, Western Australia =

South Perth
- Suburb
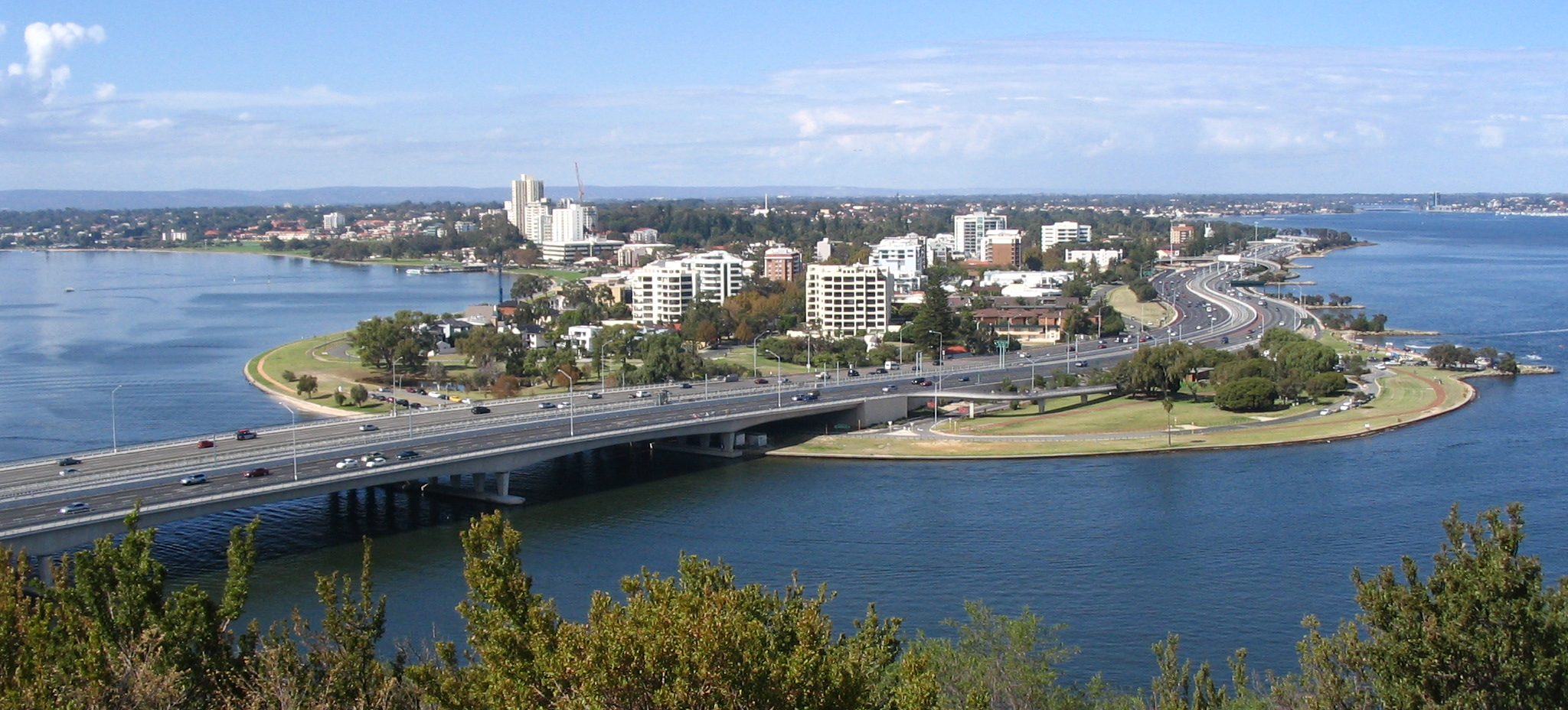
- South Perth as viewed from Kings Park
- Interactive map of South Perth
- Coordinates: 31.982°S 115.863°E
- Country: Australia
- State: Western Australia
- City: Perth
- LGA: City of South Perth
- Location: 3 km (1.9 mi) from Perth (suburb)
- Established: 1830s

Government
  - State electorate: South Perth
  - Federal division: Swan

Area
  - Total: 5.2 km^{2} (2.0 sq mi)

Population
  - Total: 12,596 (SAL 2021)
- Postcode: 6151
Suburbs around South Perth
| (Narrows Bridge) | (Swan River) |
| | South Perth | Victoria Park |
| | Como | Kensington |

South Perth is an inner suburb of Perth, the capital of the Australian state of Western Australia. Its local government area is the City of South Perth.

South Perth is separated from the Perth central business district (CBD) by Perth Water, a section of the Swan River. It is connected to the CBD via the Narrows Bridge which carries the Kwinana Freeway and Mandurah railway line. Public ferries are also operated by Transperth between the Mends Street Jetty in South Perth and Elizabeth Quay Jetty in the CBD.

South Perth is primarily residential, with commercial areas along major thoroughfares such as Canning Highway, Mill Point Road and Angelo Street. It has extensive river frontage, including the South Perth Esplanade and Sir James Mitchell Park, with high-density areas around Mill Point and Point Belches facing the Perth skyline. The suburb also includes the Perth Zoo and Royal Perth Golf Club.

== History ==
=== Indigenous occupation and European exploration ===
The history of the area now known as South Perth before permanent European settlement was broadly similar to that in other parts of what became the Swan River Colony. The area was probably inhabited by peoples of the Noongar tribes, and they had little contact with other peoples. Early Dutch and French explorers reported their presence, but no recorded contact was made. No contact is known to have been made with travellers from any other country. The Dutch expedition commanded by Willem de Vlamingh in 1697 was the first to discover the major river and note the presence of black swans on the river. They named it the Swan River.

=== Early European settlement ===
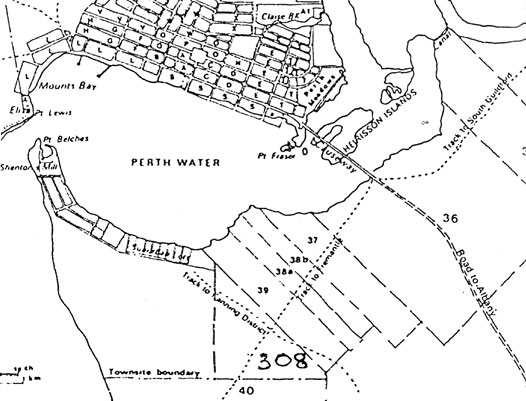
1845 map of South Perth by A Hillman

After the permanent settlement of the British and the establishment of the Swan River Colony, most development tended to take place north rather than south of the Swan River in the town of Perth and also in Fremantle, the port suburb. The area was already unofficially known as "South Perth" but was relatively untouched. By 1831, the land along the river frontage had been allocated amongst seven people, and the land was being partially used for agriculture and dairy farms. A mill was built in 1833 and a ferry across the Swan river via the Narrows was established.

=== Established settlement ===
There was some conflict between the European settlers and Aboriginal Australians, in which one of the leaders was a chief known as Yagan. After his death, local leadership went to a chief variously known as Galute or Kalyute. He led further resistance, but this was countered by a punitive expedition, which resulted in the deaths of fifteen Aboriginal people and the end of organised resistance.

By the 1850s, there was some further development of the area, with more ferry connections and the construction of the Causeway and the Canning Bridge. The area was further surveyed and lots allocated to pensioners. By 1858, the area was officially marked on maps as "South Perth" and some roads had been constructed.

The 1860s saw the realisation that large-scale farming in the district had no future, although dairying, timber cutting and vegetable growing continued. By the 1880s, a number of Chinese gardeners had arrived and they set up market gardens on land on the foreshore, between Suburban Road (now Mill Point Road) and the Swan River. After the discovery of gold in Kalgoorlie in 1893, a number of Chinese, who had been unable to take up Miner's Rights in the goldfields for racial reasons, joined them in South Perth. The Chinese worked very hard and grew good quality fruit and vegetables, which the local population were happy to buy. In the 1920s, the Chinese started to market their produce to the wider population of Perth via the James Street markets. The Chinese market gardens successfully operated for many years, despite many attempts by local authorities to serve them with notices alleging uncleanliness or health hazards. They lasted until the 1950s before they were dismantled.

With the help of convict labour, the district received more settlement and better roads. Nevertheless, the South Perth area still had a small population.

=== The 1880s South Perth land boom ===
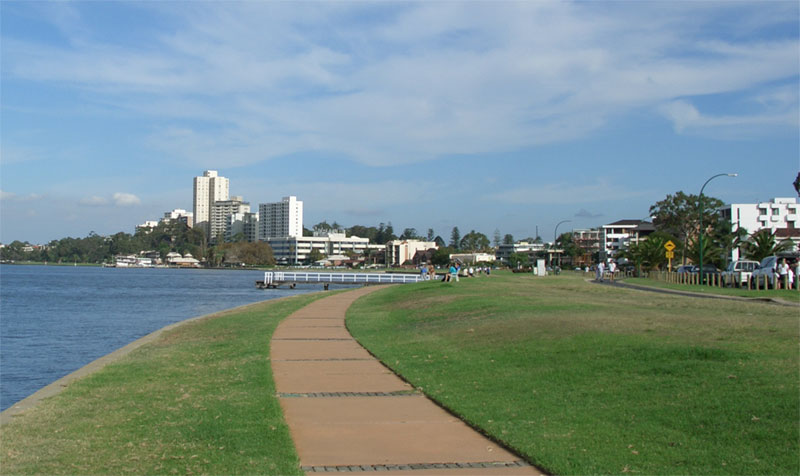
South Perth foreshore

The real estate boom of the 1880s, which coincided with the discovery of gold in the Kimberley saw a slow but appreciable growth in the number of residents. Several of Perth's more substantial citizens saw South Perth as a peaceful and tranquil suburb, and by the end of the 1890s, the population was about 400, with many elegant homes. The Zoological Gardens and the Royal Perth Golf Club were opened in 1898, and the area became popular with tourists from the town of Perth across the river.

== Attractions ==
=== Perth Zoo ===
The Perth Zoo is located in the suburb of South Perth. It is open every day of the year and its exhibits include Australian wildlife, as well as exotic and rare animal species. It opens from 9 am to 5 pm daily with additional hours during summer and special events.

=== Other attractions ===
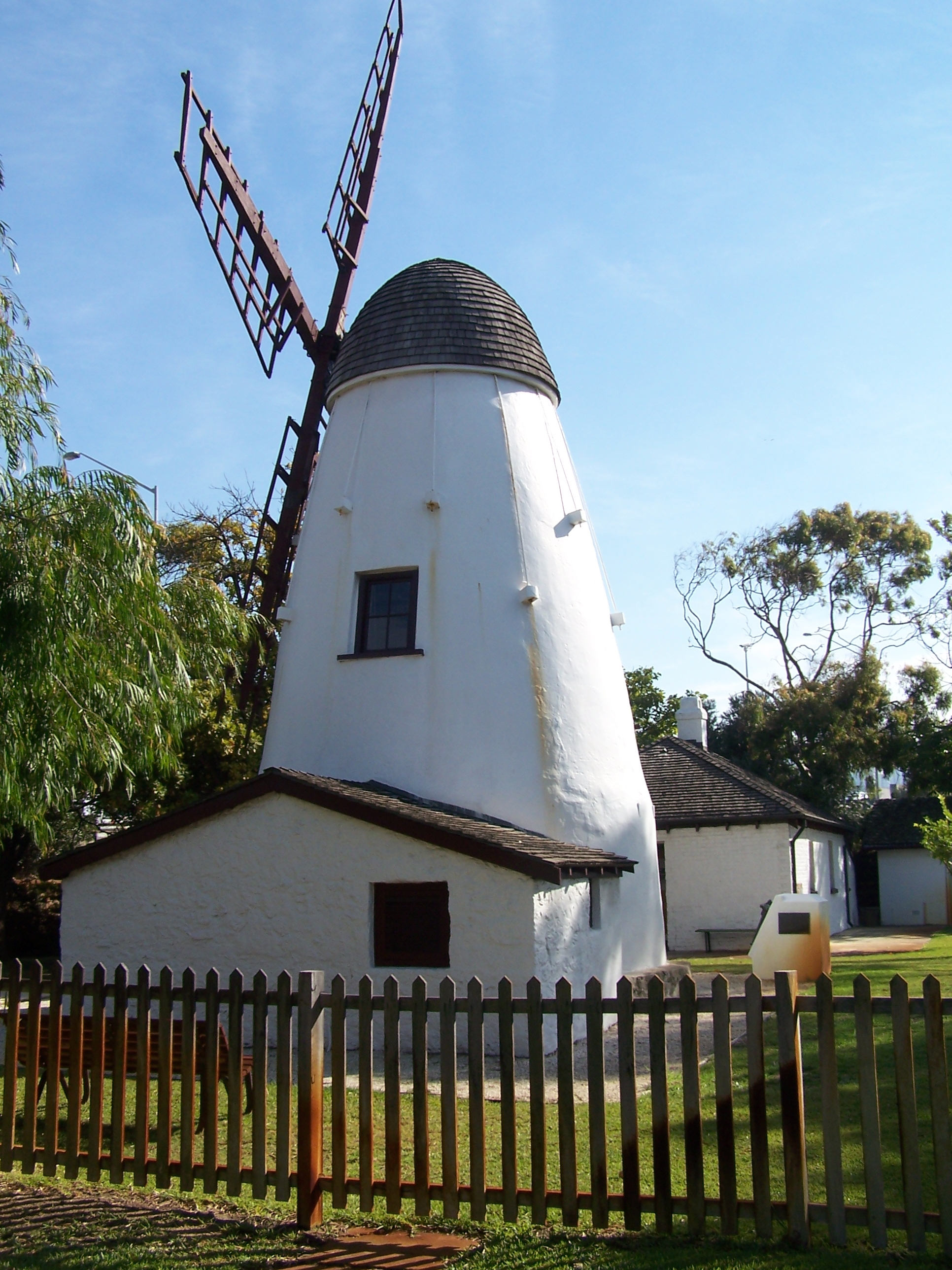
The Old Mill

The heritage-listed Old Mill, at 833 Mill Point Road, is visible to people driving south over the Narrows Bridge.

The Sir James Mitchell Park is a stretch of park lands along the foreshore. It is dotted with gazebos, family picnic areas and barbecue facilities. It is adjacent to the Swan River, stretching between the Narrows Bridge and the Causeway. It has dedicated and separate paths for bicycling and walking.

The Mends Street Jetty connects South Perth to the central business district by a regular ferry service operated by Transperth.

Other heritage-listed buildings in South Perth include:

- 103 Mill Point Road: South Perth Post Office
- 20 Coode Street: Wesley College Chapel & Memorial Rose Garden
- 112 Mill Point Road: Windsor Hotel
- Lot 429 Mends St, now the Old Mill Theatre, but originally a Mechanics' Institute (1899), also known as Mends St Mall, Miss Burnet's School, and Neeamara. The theatre is used by a local amateur theatre company.

== Residential pattern ==
South Perth is an expensive area for land due to its location near the river and central business district. Consequently, there are a comparatively high number of high-rise apartment towers in the suburb, generally near the foreshore. The tallest building is Civic Heart, which is 147.5 metres (484 ft) tall. There are also a number of large mansions. Significant numbers of townhouses and some older houses fill in the suburb.

== Educational facilities ==
- Wesley College
- South Perth Primary School
- St Columba's Primary School

== Sources ==
- The History of South Perth, by F K Crowley. Rigby Limited 1962
- Peninsula City, by Cecil Florey. City of South Perth 1995
