= Buses in Perth =

Public transport system serving Perth, Western Australia

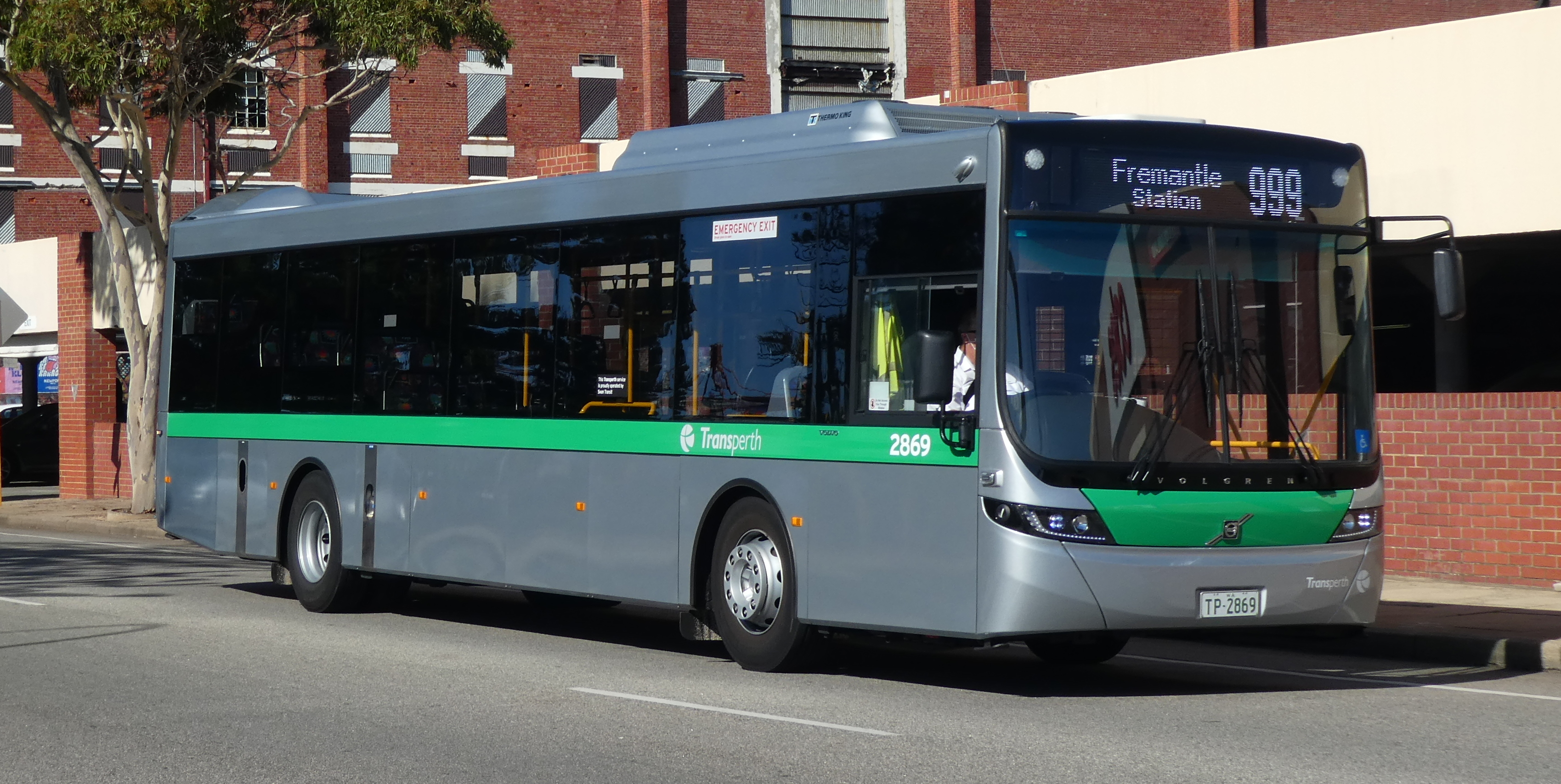
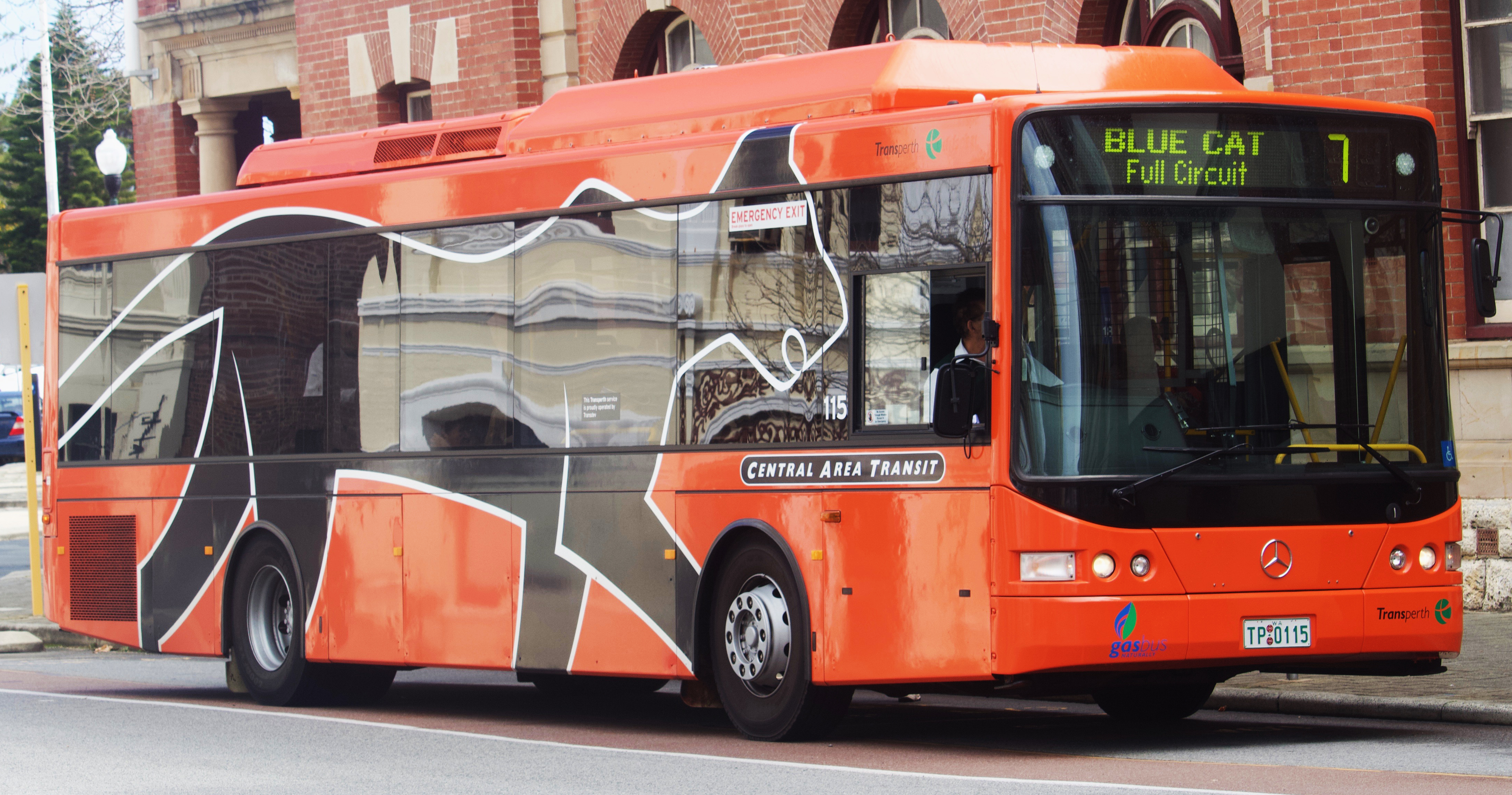
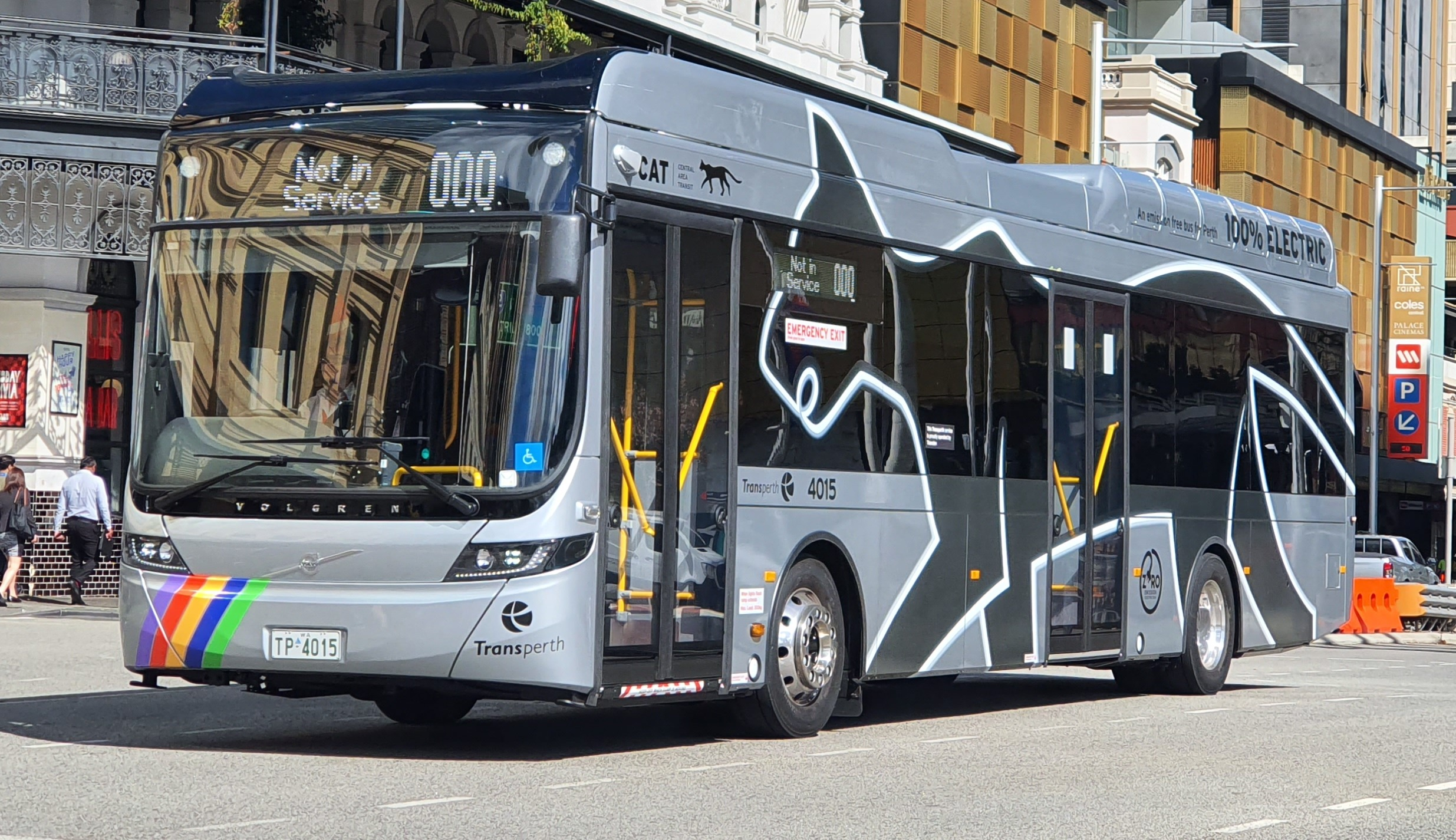
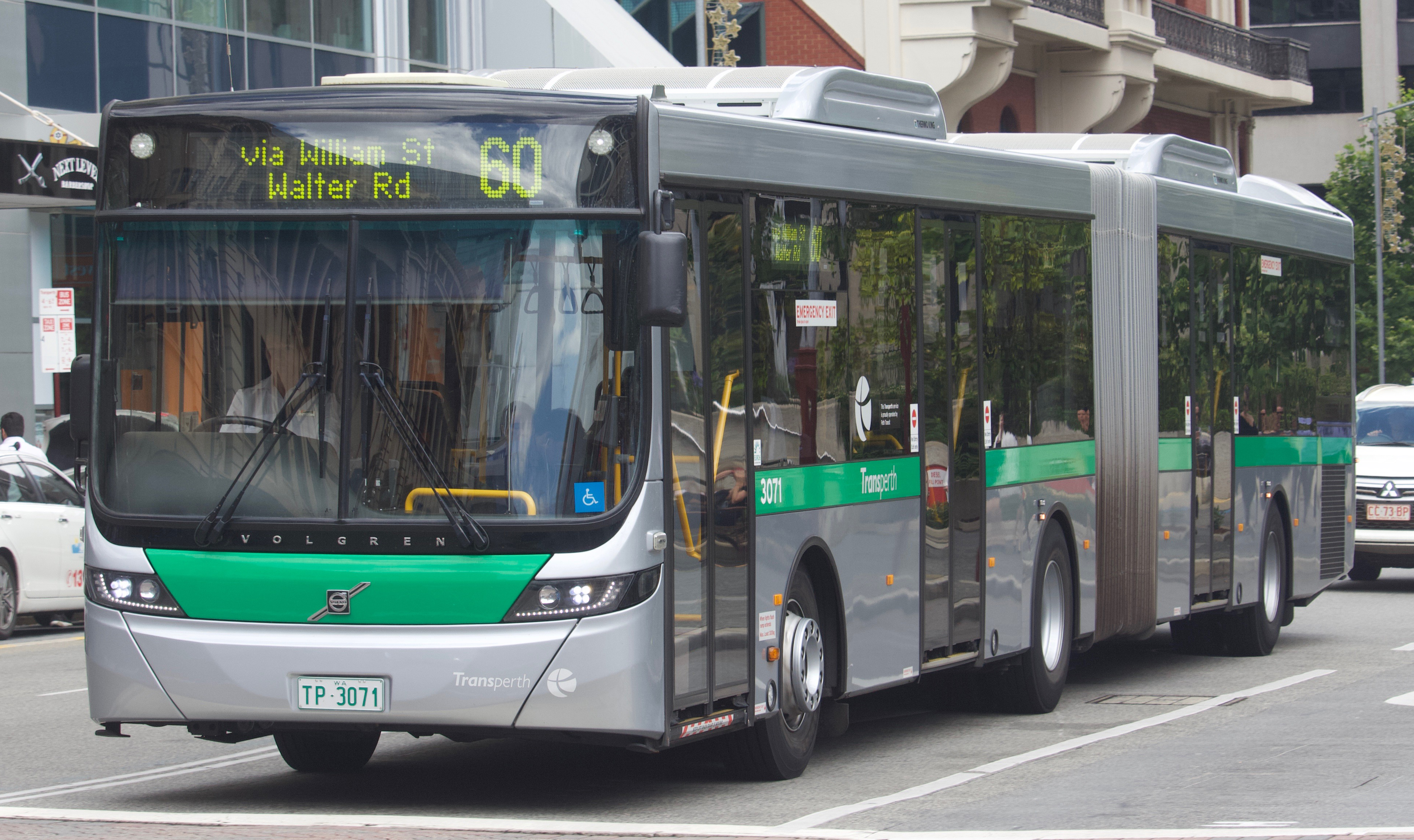
- From top left to bottom right: a Volvo B8RLE, a Mercedes-Benz OC 500 LE operating the Fremantle CAT, a Volvo BZL electric bus operating the Perth CAT, a Volvo B8RLEA articulated bus

Overview
- Owner: Public Transport Authority
- Locale: Perth, Mandurah and surrounds
- Transit type: Bus
- Number of stations: 42 bus-train interchanges 13 bus-only stations
- Annual ridership: 82,273,790 (year to June 2024)
- Headquarters: Public Transport Centre

Operation
- Operators: Path Transit (1996–present); Swan Transit (1996–present); Transdev WA (1996–present); MTT (1958–1998); Various (before 1964)
- Number of vehicles: 1,573 as of June 2023

Buses in Perth, the capital city of Western Australia, are run under the Transperth brand. The system is owned and managed by the Public Transport Authority and operations are contracted out to private operators: Swan Transit, Path Transit and Transdev.

The Transperth system has 38 bus stations, 30 of which are integrated with train stations. With 82,273,790 boardings in the year to June 2024, it is the fourth busiest bus system in Australia, after Sydney, Melbourne and Brisbane.

== History ==
The first private bus operator began in Perth in 1903. In order to protect the railways, the state government passed the Transport Co-ordination Act in 1934, forcing road transport operators to obtain a licence to transport passengers or goods. The licencing board generally permitted bus operators to continue operating, but with restrictions on when the buses could operate to reduce competition with trains. This act remained in force until 1959. The first commercially successful bus companies were set up by returning soldiers following World War I. Trolleybuses were introduced in 1933 as a supplement to the existing Perth tram network.

Investment in buses fell during and after World War II, leading the buses to become run-down. Car ownership became more common as well, and these factors caused bus patronage to fall following 1950.

In 1957, the Parliament of Western Australia passed the Metropolitan (Perth) Passenger Transport Trust Act. The act was assented on 10 December that year and on 15 January 1958, the Metropolitan (Perth) Passenger Transport Trust was formed under the trading name Metropolitan Transport Trust, or MTT for short. The act called for the MTT "to provide, maintain, protect and manage … efficient passenger transport facilities."

The MTT commenced operations on 31 August 1958. The first two private operators the MTT acquired were Metro Buses and Beam Transport. Later in 1958, Carlisle Bus Service, Kalamunda Bus Service and United Buses were acquired. In early 1959, Emu Buses was acquired. No further acquisitions were in the 1959–60 financial year, but negotiations commenced for the acquisition of the WA Government Tramways and Ferries, the Fremantle Municipal Transport Board, the Riverton Bus Service, and the Coogee-Spearwood Bus Company. Concession fares for pensioners and ex-service people were introduced. The following financial year, the MTT acquired the aforementioned agencies and companies. By this point, the MTT owned 26 different engine models which resulted in high maintenance and repair costs, so the MTT adopted a fleet standardisation policy.

The MTT acquired the North Beach Bus Company in October 1961 and in April 1962, it acquired the Scarborough Bus Service. The MTT took over the operation of the Perth to Wanneroo bus service from Metro Tours in June 1964. Bus-ferry transfers were introduced in 1964–65, which allowed transfers between the two modes with no additional cost to the passenger. This resulted in an increase in patronage on the ferry services from the Barrack Street Jetty to the Mends Street Jetty in South Perth. Diesel buses started to take over the trolleybus routes as well that financial year. On 30 August 1969, the last trolleybuses ran, making Perth the last city in Australia where trolleybuses operated.

In 1972–73, the first bus stations opened in Perth. A bus station in Morley opened in August 1972 and Wellington Street bus station opened in March 1973. These bus stations were part of a plan to build a ring of bus stations in suburban locations around Perth near shopping centres, operate feeder buses to the bus stations, where passengers could then transfer to mainline buses to the Perth central business district (CBD). Express buses would also operate between suburban bus stations and the Perth CBD during peak periods. More of these bus stations would open over the following years, including Karrinyup in September 1974, Rockingham in November 1974, Kwinana in 1975–76, Booragoon in September 1976, Innaloo in January 1977, and Mirrabooka in September 1979. In June 1980, Kelmscott railway station was redeveloped to incorporate a bus station on the railway platform for convenient transfers. Rockingham bus station was relocated to a new site in May 1981, Warwick bus station opened in March 1982, and Kalamunda bus station opened in September 1982.

In September 1973, the MTT introduced the City Clipper services, which were free bus routes which ran within the Perth CBD and are predecessors to the Perth Central Area Transit (CAT) routes.

In 1974, the MTT assumed control of Perth's suburban rail services, making all public transport in Perth under the control of one organisation for the first time. A common fare system between the trains and the buses was introduced for the first time that year. The new fare system meant many patrons got cheaper travel, in particular those who travelled long distances, and it reduced operating costs and helped to speed up services. Free return journeys within two hours were also facilitated by the new system. Smoking was banned on all MTT buses in May 1975, making the MTT Australia's first public transport operator to do so.

The MTT adopted Transperth as its trading name on 31 August 1986.

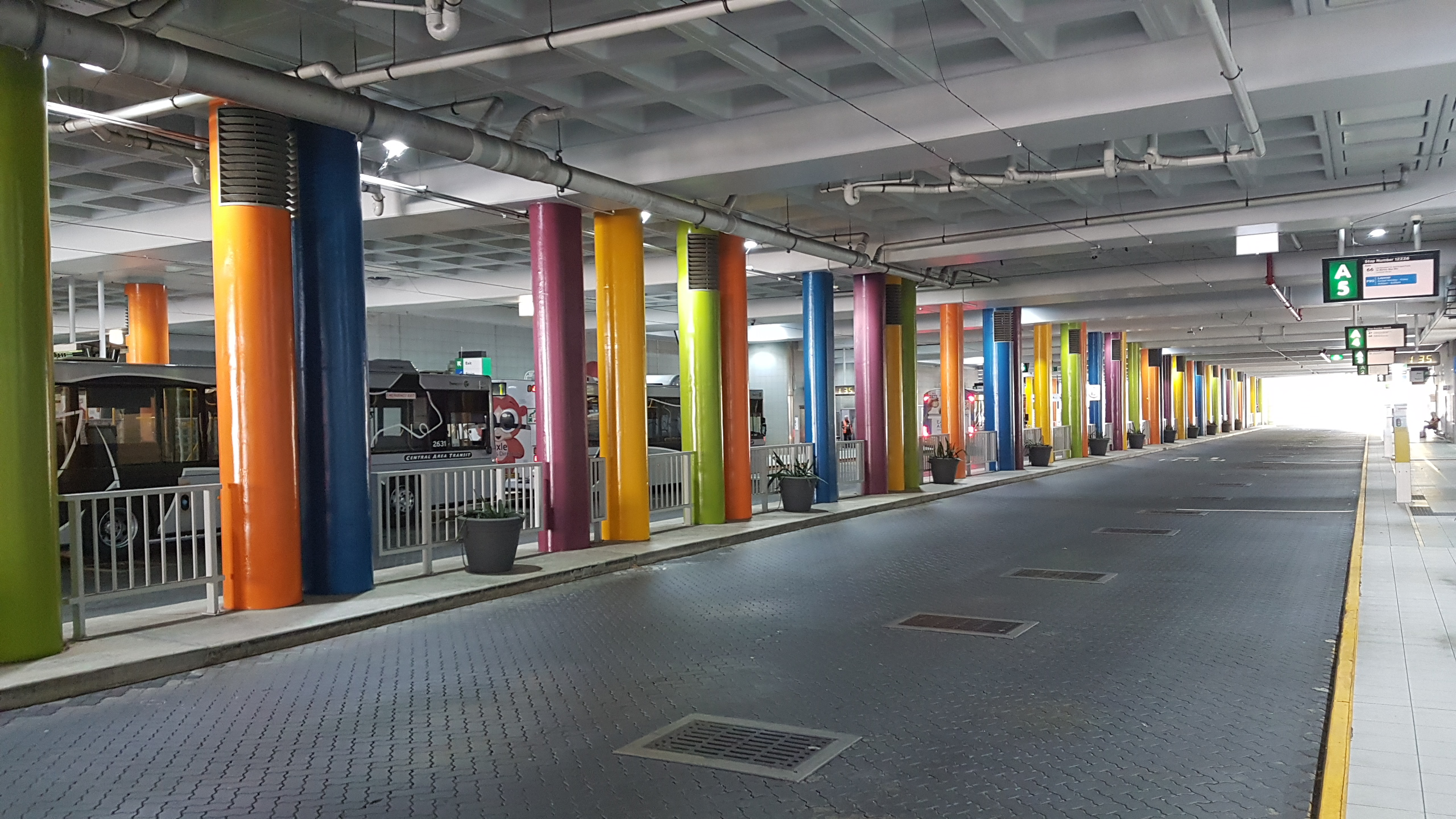
Elizabeth Quay bus station

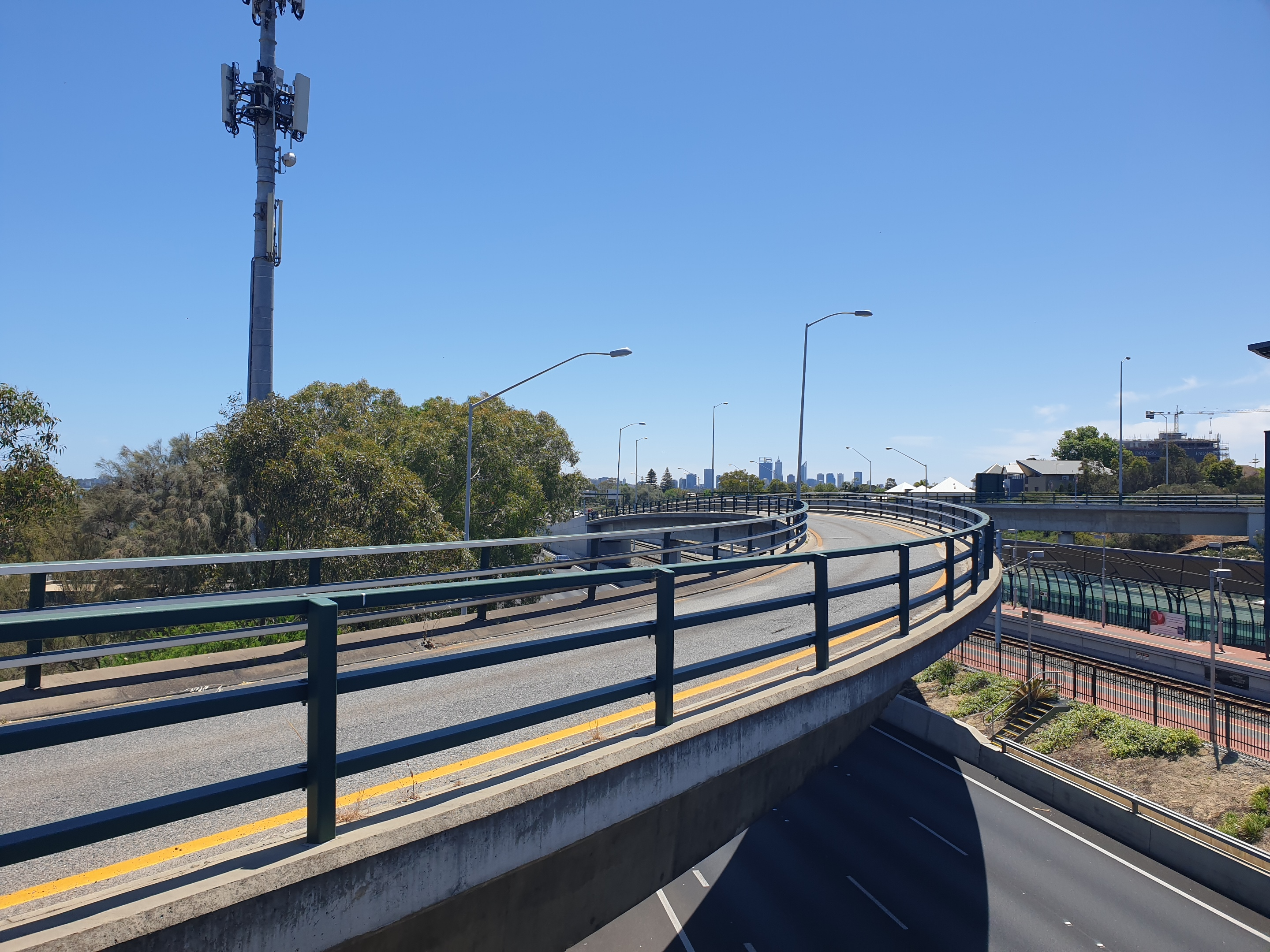
Kwinana Freeway bus on ramp at Canning Bridge railway station. The station was initially a bus station before being converted to a railway station when the Mandurah line was constructed.

Construction on the Perth City Busport (now called Elizabeth Quay bus station) began in July 1988. As part of the busport, a 7-kilometre (4.3 mi) busway was constructed down the median of the Kwinana Freeway between the busport and Canning Bridge. The busway opened in November 1989. The Perth City Busport officially opened in November 1991. The Kwinana Freeway busway was extended by 2 kilometres (1.2 mi) to Mount Henry Bridge in 1991 as well.

The Northern Suburbs Transit System fully opened in March 1993 as the Joondalup line. Bus routes in the northern suburbs were reorganised so that they fed into the Joondalup line. In June 1994, the new Morley bus station (now Galleria bus station) opened.

=== Privatisation ===
In 1993, planning and coordination of public transport was transferred from the MTT to the Department of Transport, whilst the operation of the system remained with the MTT. In September 1993, Transport Minister Eric Charlton announced plans to privatise the operation of Transperth bus services, following a recommendation given by a report written by the Commission to Review Public Sector Finances. The MTT would be corporatized and compete with the private sector to win contracts for the operation of Transperth services. This was planned to reduce the cost of operating the system whilst retaining the existing level of service. The system would remain an integrated system under the Transperth brand and the government would retain control of route planning, timetabling and fares as well as own all buses and infrastructure for the time being. The bus system was divided into 15 contract areas, with nine of these being put to tender in 1995 and 1996.

The MTT was renamed MetroBus in February 1995 as part of its corporatization, and in July 1995, MetroBus was named the preferred tenderer for the operation of buses in the Joondalup North and Armadale South contract areas. The contract for those areas was signed in November 1995, with a length of five years. Swan Transit became the first private operator, being awarded a seven-year contract to operate buses in the Midland contract area in January 1996. Further contracts were awarded in September 1996, with Southern Coast Transit becoming the operator for the Rockingham contract area, Swan Transit becoming the operator for the Southern River and Canning contract areas, and Path Transit becoming the operator for the Marmion and Wanneroo contract areas.

Contracts awarded in 1995–1996
Operator	Contract area	Date	Term
MetroBus	Armadale South	November 1995	5 years
MetroBus	Joondalup North	November 1995	5 years
Swan Transit	Midland	January 1996	7 years
MetroBus	CAT	June 1996	3 years
Southern Coast Transit	Rockingham	September 1996	7 years
Swan Transit	Southern River	September 1996	6 years
Swan Transit	Canning	September 1996	6 years
Path Transit	Marmion	September 1996	7 years
Path Transit	Wanneroo	September 1996	7 years

The transport minister announced in October 1997 plans to tender out the operation of the remaining contract areas by July 1998. The Joondalup North, Armadale South and Kalamunda contract areas had a restricted tender process where they were offered only to the three existing Transperth private sector operators. The Joondalup North contract area was awarded to Path Transit and the Armadale South and Kalamunda contract areas were awarded to Swan Transit by December 1997. The remaining contract areas had a public tender process and all contracts areas were planned to be privately operated by July 1998. Southern Coast Transit was awarded the contracts for Fremantle, Cockburn and the CAT system; Connex WA was awarded the contracts for the Belmont and Claremont contract areas, and Path Transit was awarded the contract for the Morley contract area. These contracts commenced in July 1998, and so MetroBus no longer operated buses as of that month.

The bus contracting model used in Perth has since been used in Singapore.

Curtin University bus station opened on 17 November 1999, built at a cost of $1.5 million and jointly funded by Curtin University and the state government.

=== 21st century ===
Connex WA was purchased by Swan Transit in 2002, leaving the Transperth bus system with three operators.

The Public Transport Authority (PTA) was formed on 1 July 2003, taking over from the Department of Transport as the owner and manager of the Transperth system.

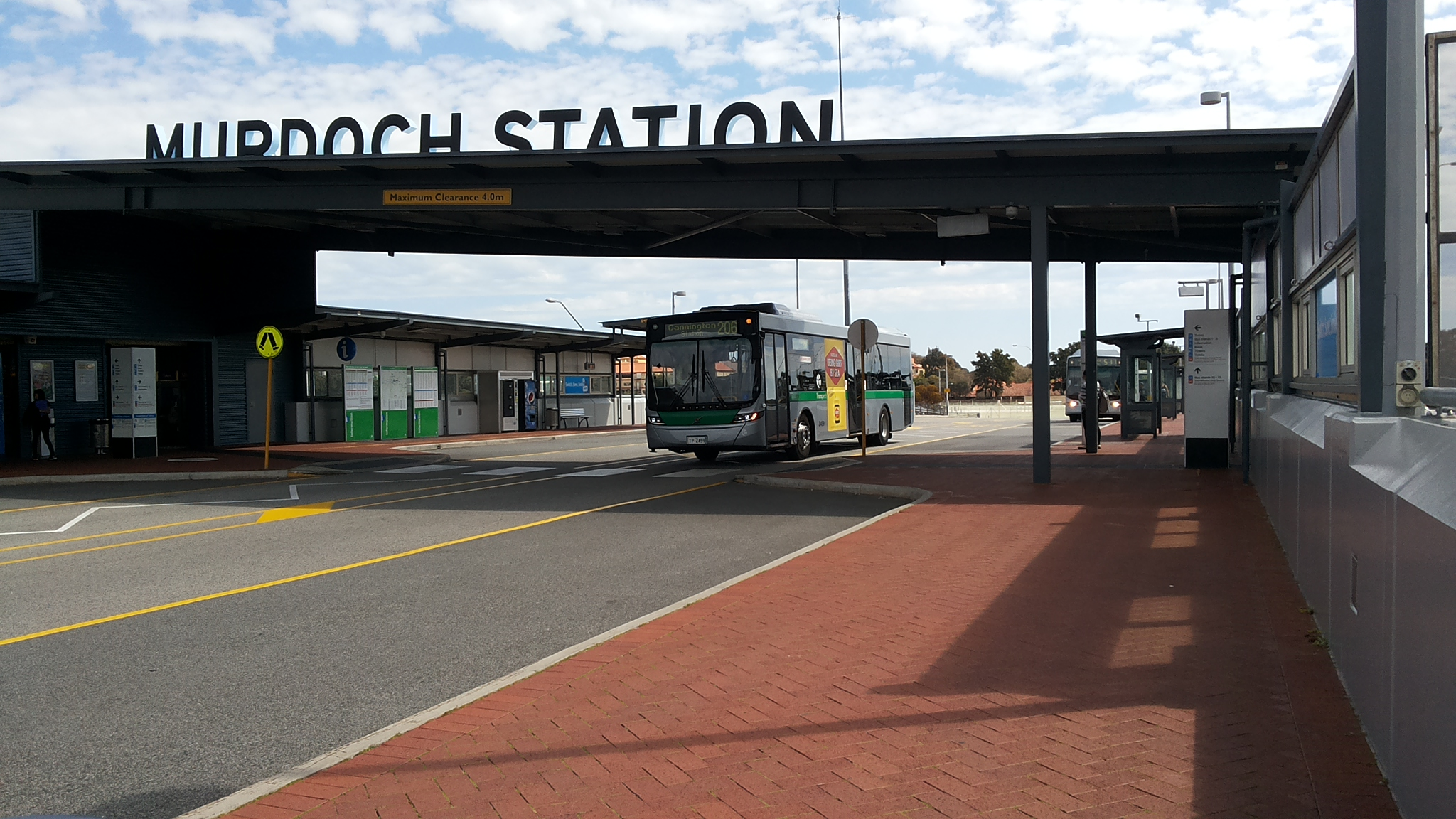
Bus interchange at Murdoch railway station on the Mandurah line

The Mandurah line opened on 23 December 2007, which resulting in a radical redrawing of bus routes in the southern suburbs so that they feed into the Mandurah line stations, which all had bus interchanges.

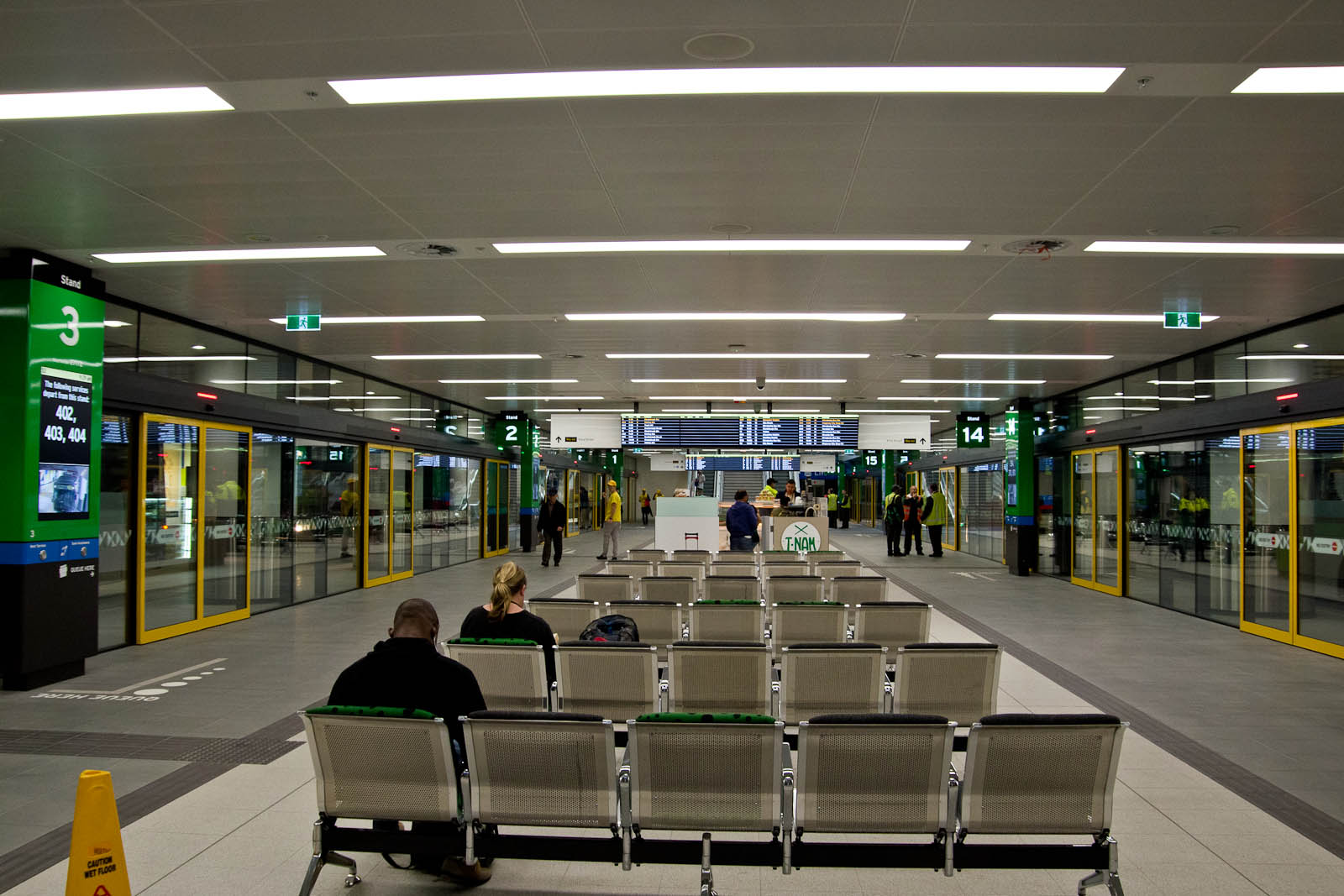
Perth Busport underground waiting area

As part of the Perth City Link project, Wellington Street bus station was closed on 27 January 2014 and replaced by the temporary Roe Street bus station so that the underground Perth Busport could be constructed in the Wellington Street bus station's place. Perth Busport began operations on 17 July 2016, replacing Roe Street bus station. The busport cost $217 million and features dynamic stand allocation to increase capacity.

Perth Stadium bus station opened at the start of 2018. It was built to serve Perth Stadium and services only operate during stadium events. Curtin Central bus station, at Curtin University, opened on 17 February 2019 to supplement Curtin University bus station and service a new transit-oriented development. On 3 November 2019, Henley Brook bus station opened and Ellenbrook transfer station closed. On 9 December 2024, the Henley Brook Bus Station was closed, and any bus routes that went to the Henley Brook Bus Station were relocated to either Whiteman Park or Ellenbrook, which are both train stations on the new Ellenbrook Line. More minor bus route changes also occurred.

== Routes ==
Transperth has 282 standard routes, 270 school bus routes and nine Central Area Transit (CAT) routes.

=== Central Area Transit ===
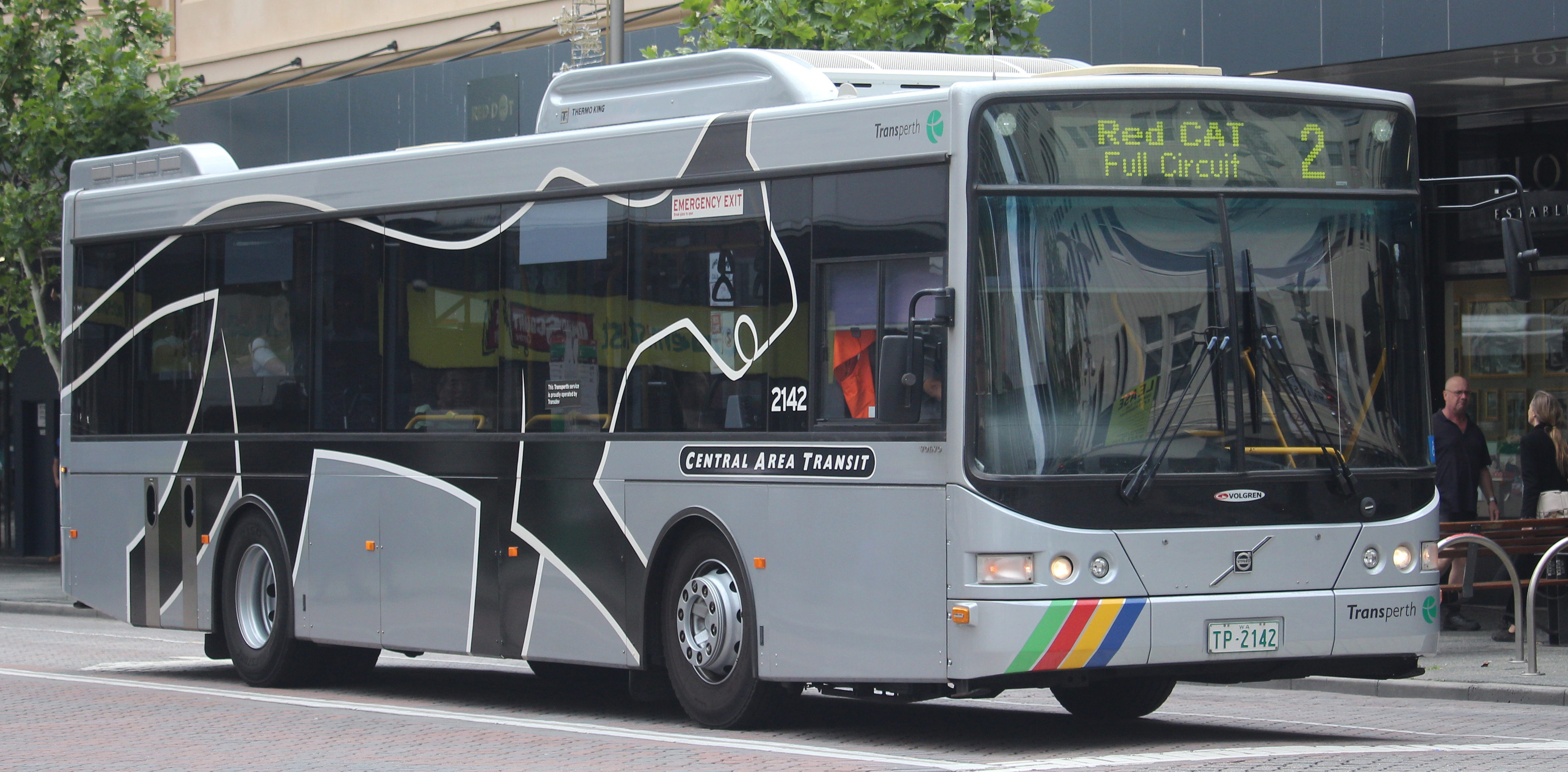
A Volvo B7RLE operating a Perth CAT

Central Area Transit (CAT) buses operate in the Perth CBD, Joondalup and on a route (Surf CAT) linking Stirling and Scarborough. CAT buses are free. Perth CAT buses are funded by the Perth Parking Levy, a parking levy on non-residential parking bays in the City of Perth. Joondalup CAT buses are funded by the City of Joondalup and Edith Cowan University and only operate on weekdays. There were Fremantle CAT buses which were funded by the City of Fremantle and the PTA. On 30 September 2023, the Fremantle CAT was withdrawn.

=== High frequency routes ===
High frequency bus routes are numbered in the 900s. The minimum frequencies required for a high frequency route are every 15 minutes between 7 am and 7 pm on weekdays, every 15 minutes between 8 am and 7 pm on Saturdays, and every 15 minutes between 9 am and 7 pm on Sundays. High frequency routes have different coloured timetables to distinguish them from regular routes.

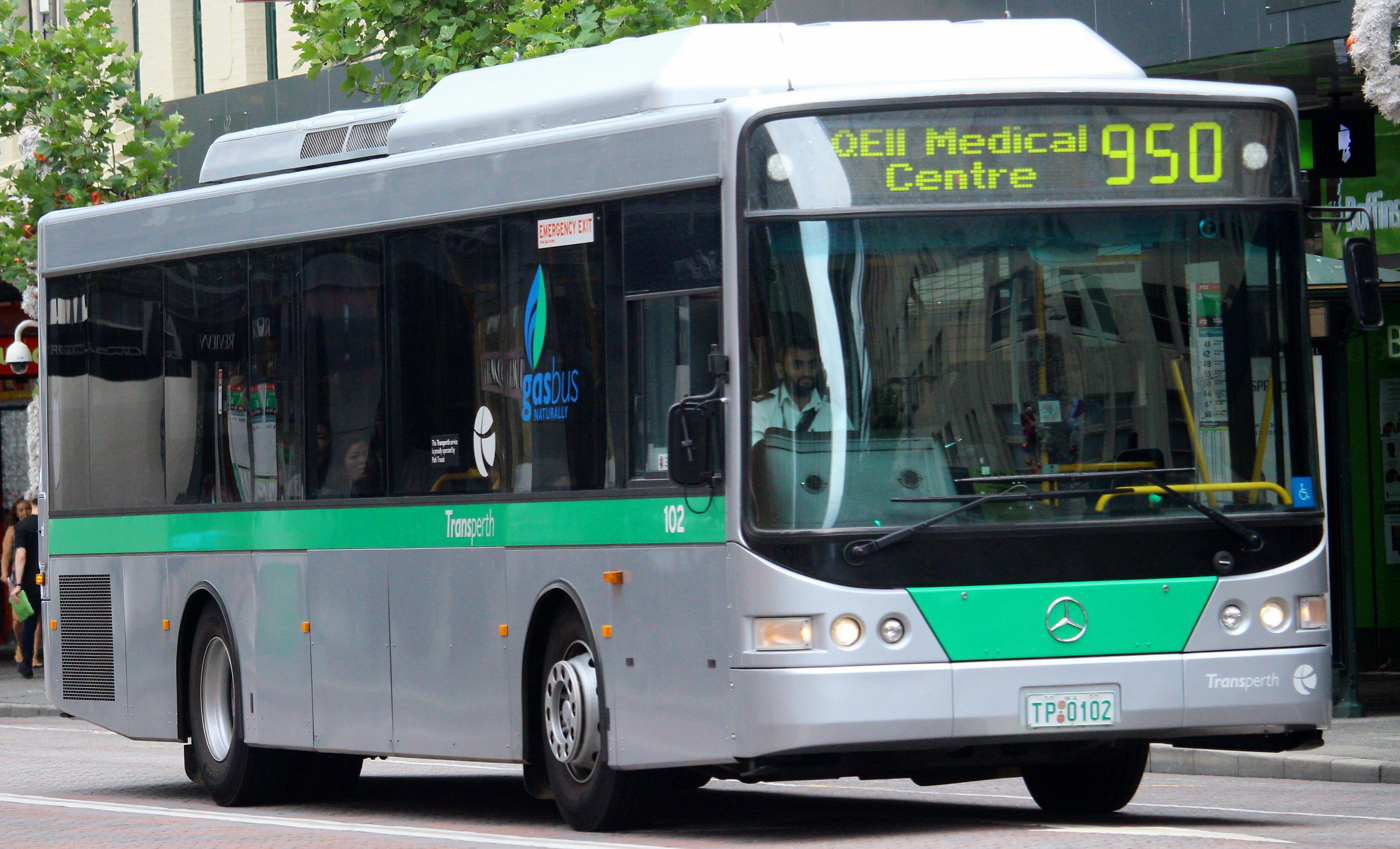
A Mercedes-Benz OC 500 LE CNG-powered bus operating route 950, the busiest bus route in Perth

The first high frequency bus route in Perth was the 950, running from Morley bus station (now Galleria bus station) to Queen Elizabeth II Medical Centre via Beaufort Street, the Perth CBD and the University of Western Australia. This route started operating on 27 January 2014, replacing several existing routes and allowing people to go from the route's northern and southern legs without transferring to a different bus route. At its most frequent, the 950 runs every one to four minutes, making it Perth's most frequent bus route. By May 2014, the 950 had 17,000 daily riders, 2,000 more than expected, and within the first year of operating, the 950 had 3.7 million total boardings, 1 million more than the bus routes the 950 replaced. By July 2014, peak hour bus lanes had been completed along Beaufort Street between Bulwer Street and Grand Promenade. More bus lanes were built along Mounts Bay Road in 2015, further speeding up the 950. In a customer satisfaction survey, it was found that passengers on the 950 were the most satisfied out of any Transperth bus route excluding CAT bus routes, with 94 percent satisfaction. In August 2017, a free wi-fi trial commenced for two buses used on the 950.

On 9 October 2016, route 960 was introduced, running between Curtin University and Mirrabooka bus station via the Perth CBD and Edith Cowan University in Mount Lawley. The 960 replaced two previous routes and was made possible by new $1.4 million bus lanes along Fitzgerald Street. Route 970 also started on the same day as the 960, running between Perth Busport and Mirrabooka bus station via Flinders Street.

Route	Date introduced	Routes replaced
910	11 October 2015	105, 106
915	19 July 2020	501
920	5 July 2026	100
925	9 June 2025	507
930	31 January 2016	210, 211, 212
935	7 August 2016	37
940	10 October 2022	40
950	27 January 2014	21, 22, 78, 79
960	9 October 2016	885, 888
970	9 October 2016	870
975	9 December 2024	371
980	13 November 2022	60
990	4 May 2014	400, 408
995	18 July 2021	102, 107

On 9 December 2024, there were multiple high frequency bus changes which coincided with the opening of the Ellenbrook Line. The 950 and 970 got X counterparts (which are limited stops services), the 950 was extended from Galleria bus station (previously known as Morley bus station) to Morley railway station and the 970 was extended north to Landsdale.

=== CircleRoute ===
The CircleRoute (routes 998 and 999) are a pair of bus routes that form a circuit around Perth's inner suburbs, linking railway stations, universities, hospitals and shopping centres and making journeys without going to the Perth CBD easier. The first section of the CircleRoute was between Fremantle station and Oats Street station, launching on 16 February 1998. By March 1998, over 4,000 people were using the CircleRoute per day. The complete CircleRoute launched on 22 February 1999. By April 1999, an average of 8,500 people were using the CircleRoute per weekday. In December 2000, the CircleRoute started running seven days per week. As of March 2017, the two CircleRoute routes were the second and third busiest Transperth bus routes.

=== Event services ===
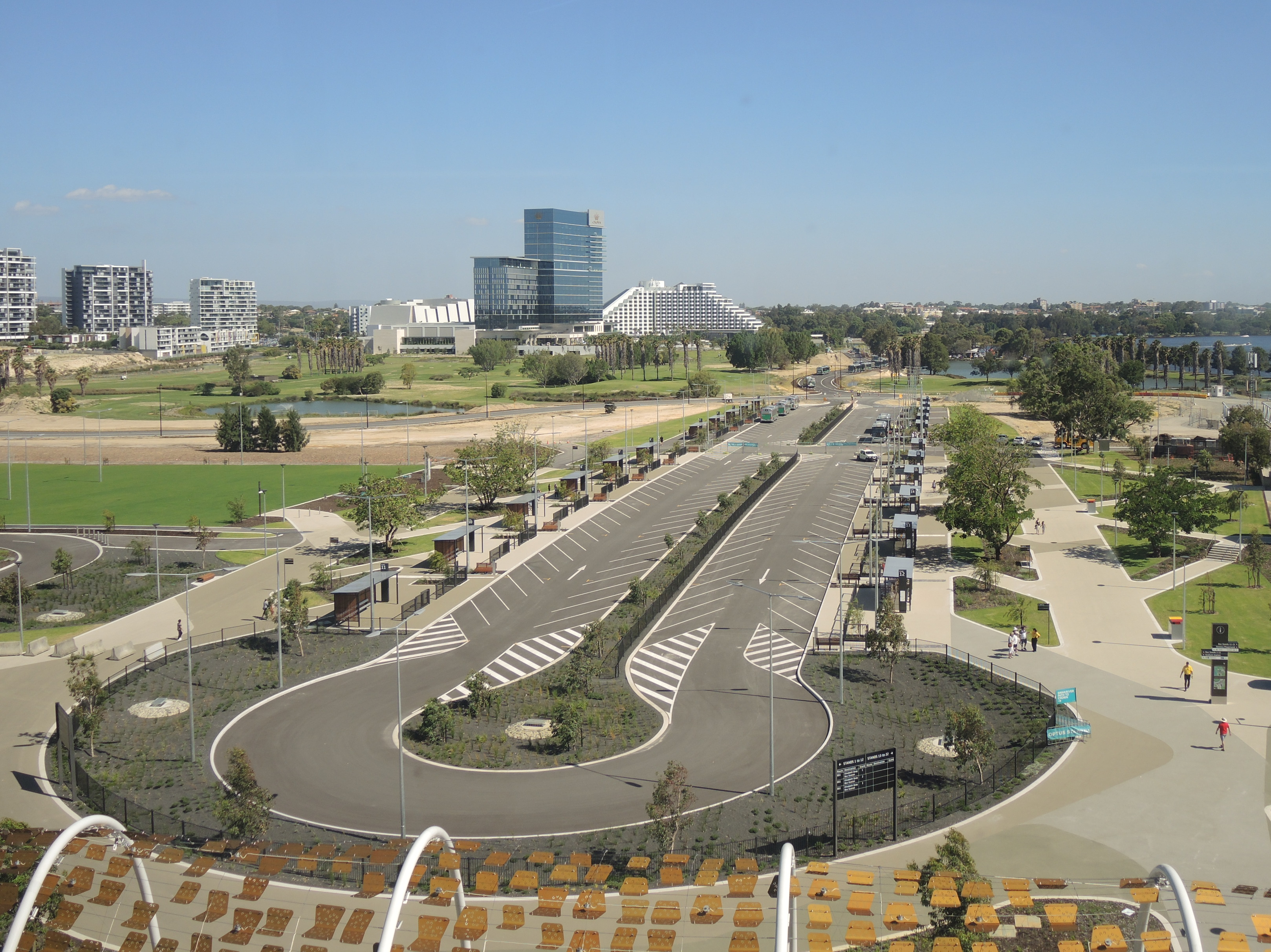
Perth Stadium bus station viewed from Perth Stadium

Transperth provides event services to and from Perth Stadium (Optus Stadium) before and after events. Event bus services link Perth Stadium bus station to the Perth CBD, Karrinyup bus station, Mirrabooka bus station, Galleria bus station, Ellenbrook town centre via Bassendean station, Kalamunda bus station via High Wycombe station, Canning Vale, Curtin University bus station, Booragoon bus station via Canning Bridge station, and Fremantle station via Canning Bridge station. The Perth Stadium bus station is designed to move 14,300 passengers by bus within one hour after an event at the stadium out of the total stadium capacity of 60,000 people.

== Stations ==
Transperth has fourteen bus-only stations and 37 bus-train interchange stations.

== Fleet ==
At the end of the 2024–25 financial year, there were 1,810 Transperth buses, of which 1,508 were diesel powered, 269 were powered by compressed natural gas (CNG), and 33 were battery-electric. These buses were manufactured by Volvo and Mercedes-Benz and the bodies were manufactured by Volgren in Malaga, Western Australia. All buses purchased since 1999 have been low-floor and fully-wheelchair accessible. From 2010, Transperth has purchased Euro 5 compliant buses, and more recently, Euro 6 compliant buses.

Transperth received its first natural gas-powered bus in June 1993. By April 1998, there were 46 gas buses in the fleet.

In January 1999, Transperth received the first of 848 new low-floor and fully-wheelchair accessible Mercedes-Benz buses, supplied by DaimlerChrysler over 10-years. It was chosen not to procure any gas buses as an "expert reference group" had determined that Euro 2 diesel buses were better. In October 2000, a trial of three compressed natural gas (CNG) buses was announced. The trial was jointly funded by the state and federal governments at a cost of $5 million. In 2001, new planning and infrastructure minister Alannah MacTiernan renegotiated the contract with DaimlerChrysler so that 451 CNG-powered buses could be supplied instead. The first of those buses entered service in early-2004. In April 2004, the government signed a contract with Origin Energy to install CNG fuelling facilities at Morley and Bayswater bus depots. In 2004, a trial of three hydrogen fuel cell buses commenced.

Following the end of the previous contract, Volvo was awarded the next contract, worth $400 million for 65 buses per year over ten years. For a projected total of 650 buses. The first of those buses was delivered in June 2011. In 2013, a trial of one diesel-electric hybrid bus for the Perth CAT routes was undertaken. The trial concluded that diesel-electric buses were not suitable and that $18.2 million would be spent to replace 32 CAT buses with Euro 6 diesel buses.

A new contract was signed in March 2019 with Volvo for the supply of 900 buses over ten years at a cost of $549 million.

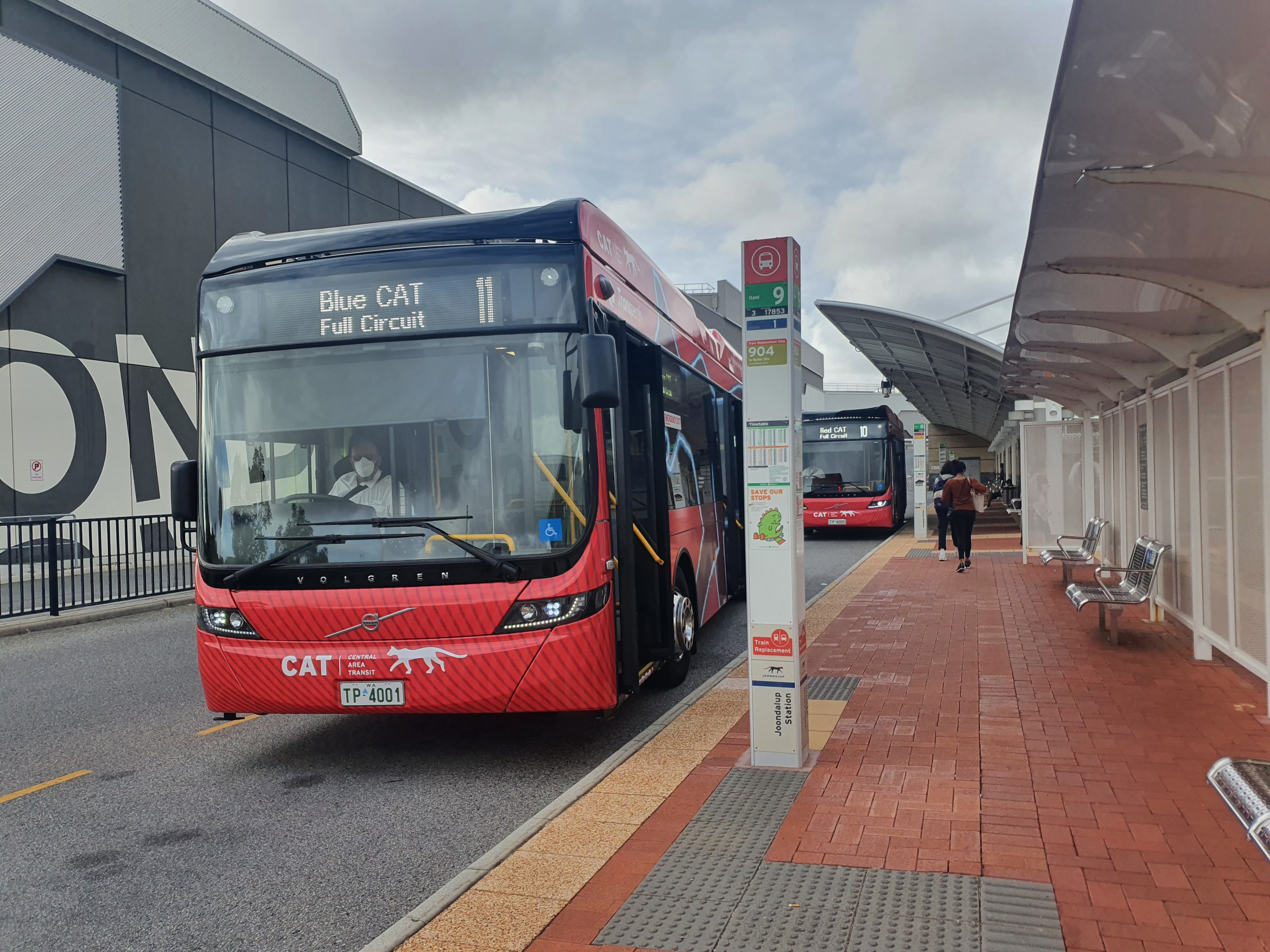
Electric CAT buses at Joondalup railway station

In July 2020, the Government of Western Australia announced an electric bus trial for the Joondalup CAT routes. The trial involved four electric buses built under the existing ten-year contract that the PTA had with Volvo and Volgren. The trial involved the modification of the Joondalup bus depot for electric bus charging infrastructure and the Joondalup CAT routes were chosen as they were short routes which made them ideal for electric buses. The first electric bus entered service on 28 February 2022. They were manufactured in Melbourne, but the state government planned to manufacture future electric buses in Perth if the trial is successful.

In 2022, the federal government committed $125 million to building electric bus charging infrastructure around Perth. The state government committed $125 million to manufacture 130 electric buses in Perth. An initial $22 million was funded using the Perth parking levy to build charging infrastructure at Elizabeth Quay bus station and build 22 electric buses. The first electric Perth CAT bus entered service in September 2024. It was also announced that Malaga depot would be upgraded for $12 million to allow for electric buses.

== Ticketing ==
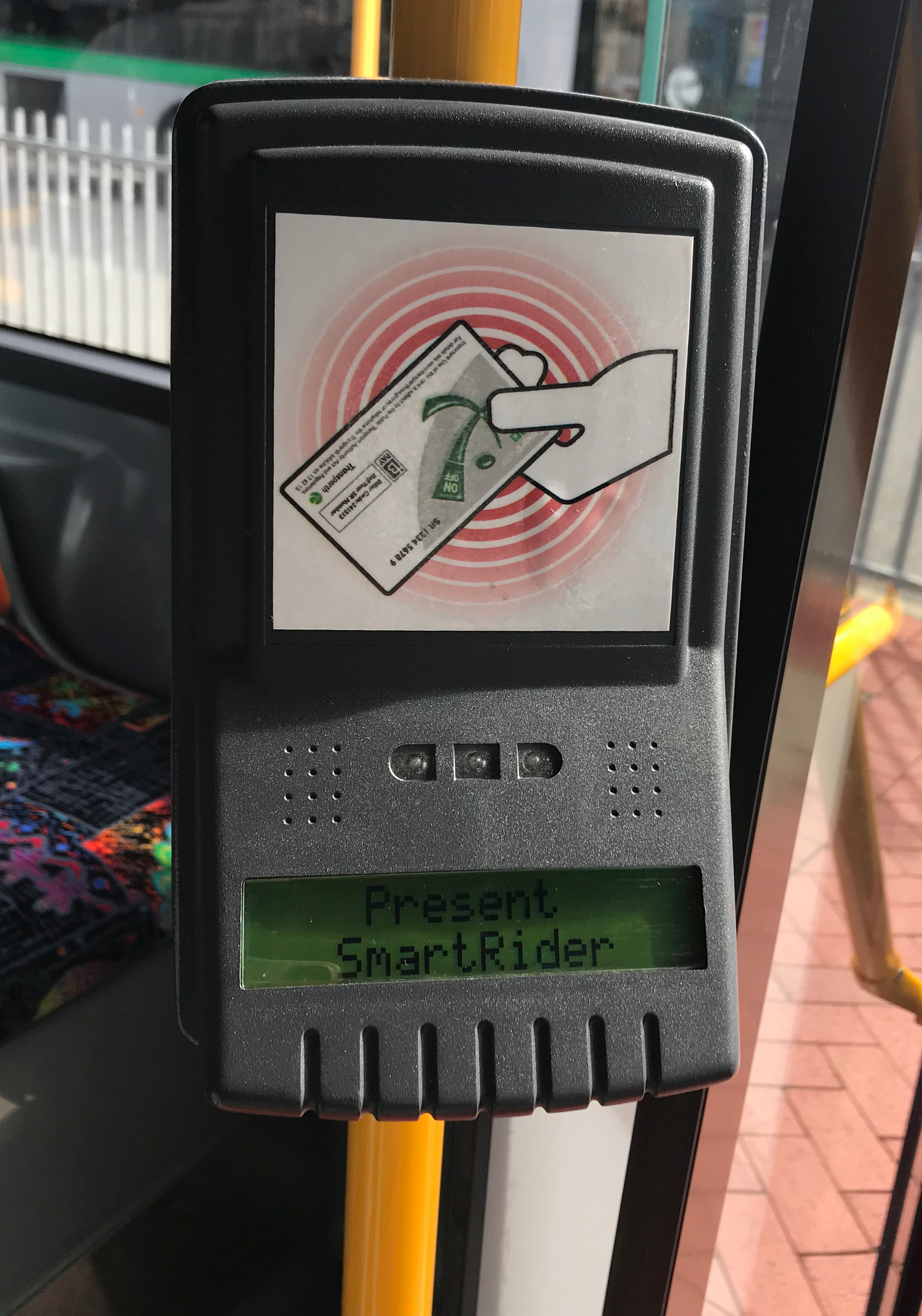
SmartRider tag-on machine on a Transperth bus

== Contractors ==
The bus system is split into 11 contract areas.

From January 2020, Swan Transit has held the Claremont, Marmion, and Joondalup areas under a ten-year contract. The Joondalup contract area was previously held by Transdev. From October 2022, Transdev has held the Fremantle and Rockingham/Mandurah areas under a ten-year contract.

Operator	Contract area	Patronage (2024–25)
Path Transit	Morley	11,719,000
Path Transit	Kalamunda	8,757,000
Swan Transit	Marmion	7,738,000
Swan Transit	Canning	8,141,000
Swan Transit	Claremont	3,920,000
Swan Transit	Midland	2,278,000
Swan Transit	Southern River	7,087,000
Swan Transit	Joondalup	7,254,000
Transdev	Perth CATs	
Transdev	Fremantle / Cockburn	9,626,000
Transdev	Rockingham / Mandurah	5,029,000

== Depots ==
There are 20 Transperth bus depots, five of which are privately owned and the remainder are owned by the PTA. The PTA has endeavoured to replace all private depots with PTA-owned depots.

In July 2019, Mount Claremont bus depot opened, replacing the privately owned North Fremantle bus depot. By the end of 2024, a new bus depot is planned to open at Henley Brook bus station to replace the privately owned Ellenbrook bus depot and provide for expanded services for the Ellenbrook line. In September 2024, the PTA purchased a 3.27-hectare (8.1-acre) site in Bayswater for a new electric bus depot.

Transperth depots
Depot	Ownership	Contract area
Beckenham	PTA	Canning
Jandakot	PTA	Canning
Mount Claremont	PTA	Claremont
Shenton Park	Private	Claremont
Palmyra	Private	Fremantle
Joondalup	PTA	Joondalup
Nowergup	PTA	Joondalup
Wangara	Private	Joondalup
Kalamunda	PTA	Kalamunda
Welshpool	PTA	Kalamunda
Karrinyup	PTA	Marmion
Ellenbrook	Private	Midland
Midvale	Private	Midland
Mundaring	PTA	Midland
Bayswater	PTA	Morley
Malaga	PTA	Morley
East Perth	PTA	Perth CATs
Mandurah	PTA	Rockingham / Mandurah
Rockingham	PTA	Rockingham / Mandurah
Southern River	PTA	Southern River

== Patronage ==
Perth bus patronage

FY	Patronage	±% p.a.
1900	800,000	—
1910	600,000	−2.84%
1920	300,000	−6.70%
1930	1,800,000	+19.62%
1940	16,200,000	+24.57%
1945	22,400,000	+6.70%
1950	39,200,000	+11.84%
1960	56,200,000	+3.67%
1970	57,000,000	+0.14%
1980	56,100,000	−0.16%
1981	56,800,000	+1.25%
1982	53,800,000	−5.28%
1983	54,100,000	+0.56%
1984	46,600,000	−13.86%
1985	44,900,000	−3.65%
1986	48,000,000	+6.90%
1987	49,400,000	+2.92%
1988	48,800,000	−1.21%
1989	52,000,000	+6.56%
1990	54,900,000	+5.58%
1991	54,900,000	+0.00%
1992	53,400,000	−2.73%
1993	51,300,000	−3.93%
1994	49,100,000	−4.29%
1995	46,000,000	−6.31%
1996	45,600,000	−0.87%
1997	46,900,000	+2.85%
1998	46,700,000	−0.43%

FY	Patronage	±% p.a.
1999	46,300,000	−0.86%
2000	48,600,000	+4.97%
2001	52,000,000	+7.00%
2002	54,500,000	+4.81%
2003	56,300,000	+3.30%
2004	58,998,082	+4.79%
2005	61,873,225	+4.87%
2006	63,891,362	+3.26%
2007	64,622,615	+1.14%
2008	65,693,955	+1.66%
2009	73,550,181	+11.96%
2010	74,756,477	+1.64%
2011	76,636,351	+2.51%
2012	80,626,481	+5.21%
2013	83,543,424	+3.62%
2014	83,714,090	+0.20%
2015	84,142,590	+0.51%
2016	82,390,945	−2.08%
2017	80,016,728	−2.88%
2018	78,541,440	−1.84%
2019	79,266,899	+0.92%
2020	66,256,895	−16.41%
2021	58,700,701	−11.40%
2022	58,890,882	+0.32%
2023	69,381,824	+17.81%
2024	82,273,790	+18.58%
2025	85,878,594	+4.38%

Source: Bureau of Infrastructure & Transport Research Economics PTA

With 82,273,790 boardings in the year to June 2024, the Transperth bus system has the fourth highest patronage in Australia, after Sydney, Melbourne and Brisbane.

The most frequently used routes are as follows:

Most frequently used bus routes from April 2016 to March 2017
Number	Description	Passenger boardings
950	High frequency route from Galleria bus station to QEII Medical Centre via Beaufort Street, Perth and UWA	3,000,000–4,000,000
998	CircleRoute clockwise	2,000,000–3,000,000
999	CircleRoute anticlockwise	2,000,000–3,000,000
100	Cannington station to Canning Bridge station via Curtin University	1,000,000–2,000,000
910	High frequency route from Fremantle station to Elizabeth Quay bus station via Canning Highway	1,000,000–2,000,000
930	High frequency route from Thornlie station to Elizabeth Quay bus station via Shepperton Road and Albany Highway	1,000,000–2,000,000
990	High frequency route from Scarborough Beach bus station to Perth Busport via Glendalough station	1,000,000–2,000,000

== Bibliography ==
- Auditor General (June 1997). "Competition Reform of Transperth Bus Services: Performance Examination" (PDF). Office of the Auditor General.
- Higham, Geoffrey (2007). Marble Bar to Mandurah: A History of Passenger Rail Services in Western Australia. Rail Heritage WA. ISBN 9780959969092.
