= Perth Central Area Transit =

Urban bus routes in metropolitan area of Perth, Australia

- Parent: Transperth
- Founded: 23 September 1996
- Locale: Perth; Joondalup; Scarborough
- Service type: Free city bus
- Routes: 9
- Operator: Transperth
- Website: www.transperth.wa.gov.au/Timetables/CAT-Timetables

The Perth Central Area Transit (Perth CAT) system, or simply CAT, consists of five bus routes in the centre of Perth, three bus routes in Joondalup, and a route called Surf CAT linking Stirling and Scarborough. CAT services formerly operated in Fremantle, and similar services exist in Rockingham (called City Centre Transit System) and Midland (called Midland Gate Shuttle).

The services' logo is a cat, featured as a large graphic on the side of the buses and as an icon instead of a route number on Transperth electronic timetables. Unlike all other Transperth services, most CAT routes are free and a SmartRider is not needed.

== Perth CAT ==
On 23 September 1996, MetroBus commenced operating two CAT routes: the Red CAT and the Blue CAT, replacing the City Clipper services that had operated since September 1973. The Yellow CAT was commenced in 2002 and the Green CAT route began on 30 June 2013. The Purple CAT commenced on 27 February 2022. These CAT services are operated by Transdev WA. The routes are funded by the Perth Parking Levy.

Initially Perth CAT buses stopped at every stop, but with the introduction of the Purple CAT service passengers are now required to hail incoming buses and press the bell if they wish to alight.

=== Blue CAT ===
The Blue CAT, introduced on 23 September 1996, runs between Kings Park and the Perth Busport via Elizabeth Quay Bus Station and Northbridge as bus route number 1. The route runs 15 minute frequencies every day. Some early morning and late night services do not run to Kings Park from Elizabeth Quay Bus Station.

=== Red CAT ===
The Red CAT runs between West Perth and East Perth as bus route number 2. During peak times a shorter Red CAT travels between the Forrest Place stop opposite Perth railway station and the West Perth stop as bus route number 4 to meet high demand for travel between these. In addition, the West Perth Loop of the Red CAT travels from Perth Underground to Raine Square. The route runs 5 minute frequencies on weekdays and 8 minute frequencies on weekends and public holidays.

=== Yellow CAT ===
The Yellow CAT, introduced on 15 December 2002, runs between Claisebrook station in East Perth and West Perth as bus route number 3. The route runs 6 minute frequencies on weekdays and 8 minute frequencies on weekends.

=== Green CAT ===
The Green CAT commenced on 1 July 2013, and runs between Leederville railway station and Elizabeth Quay Bus Station as bus route number 5. Intended to ease congestion in the central business district, the Green CAT does not run on weekends nor on public holidays. The route runs 10 minute frequencies on weekdays, excluding public holidays.

=== Purple CAT ===
The Purple CAT commenced on 27 February 2022, and runs between the University of Western Australia and Elizabeth Quay Bus Station via the Queen Elizabeth II Medical Centre as bus route number 6. The route runs 10 minute frequencies on weekdays and 15 minute frequencies on weekends.

== Joondalup CAT ==
The Joondalup CAT started operating on 9 January 2006. It is currently operated by Swan Transit since 20 January 2020. It runs Monday to Friday around the Joondalup central business district as bus routes 10 (anticlockwise) and 11 (clockwise), as the Red and Blue CAT buses respectively.

On Mondays to Thursdays from 6 pm to 9 pm, Joondalup CAT also runs around the Joondalup Campus of Edith Cowan University as the Yellow CAT and route 13, but only on the university's operating days.

== Surf CAT ==
In February 2025, the first Cook ministry announced that it would introduce a free CAT bus service, dubbed Surf CAT, between Stirling railway station and Scarborough Beach bus station via Ellen Stirling Boulevard and Scarborough Beach Road, if re-elected in the 2025 Western Australian state election. After being re-elected, the second Cook ministry allocated A$18 million towards the new service.

The Surf CAT started operating from 30 November 2025 as bus route 420. It runs from early morning to late at night with 10 to 15 minute frequencies seven days a week. The Surf CAT buses feature internal racks for carriage of surfboards.

== Retired services ==
=== Fremantle CAT ===
A Fremantle CAT service operated in Fremantle between August 2000 and October 2023. Originating in 1997 as the Fremantle Clipper, it only operated on weekdays and public holidays with a 15 minute frequency. The original route alignment spanned between Beach Street and Parry Street on the north and south parts of the Fremantle CBD respectively. The contract to run the service was awarded to Path Transit, which was part of the Australian Transit Enterprises (now Keolis Downer) ownership, using their own (not PTA purchased) low-entry, Volgren CR221L-bodied, Dennis Dart SLF. It was then subsequently awarded to Southern Coast Transit (now Transdev WA).

The service was reintroduced in August 2000 as the incumbent Fremantle CAT and upgraded to run seven days a week with a frequency of 8 to 10 minutes, using short wheelbase Volgren CR225L-bodied Mercedes-Benz O405NH's sporting dedicated orange livery and fleet numbers 1178, 1179 and 1180.

The route alignment was amended at the same time and expanded to South Street, then further south to Douro Road in February 2002. The final extension to the Maritime Museum took place in December 2003. In May 2011, the original figure-8 alignment was split into 2 different colour-coded variations. Initially referred simply as the North Loop and South Loop during public consultation, it later became the Red CAT and Blue CAT respectively. October 2017 saw the Mercedes-Benz O405NHs withdrawn from the service and redeployed on regular Transperth routes until 2020; they were replaced with the Volgren CR228L-bodied Mercedes-Benz OC500LEs that were previously used on the Perth CATs. They sported fleet numbers 114 (ex-CAT8), 115 (ex-CAT9) and 116 (ex-CAT10) and also their own dedicated livery.

Following a funding reduction by the City of Fremantle as a result from the onset of the COVID-19 pandemic, the Red CAT service ceased operations on 15 August 2020. The Blue CAT frequency was also reduced to every 20 minute until October 2023, when the Fremantle CAT ceased operating after the City of Fremantle declined to continue co-funding the free service in May 2023. To compensate, the existing 532 bus route now operates more short trips along South Terrace, terminating at Hampton Rd after Culver St.

== Similar services ==
=== Rockingham City Centre Transit System ===
The Rockingham City Centre Shuttle started operation on 23 December 2007. It is the only CAT service that charges a fare. It travels between Rockingham railway station and Rockingham Centre. It runs as bus route 555.

=== Midland Gate Shuttle ===
The Midland Gate Shuttle started operation on 5 July 2009. It runs as route 300 and does not operate on Sundays and Public holidays. It travels in an anti-clockwise circle from Midland station around Midland Gate Shopping Centre and then back to Midland station. The owners of Midland Gate fully fund the service.

== Fleet ==
Perth CAT

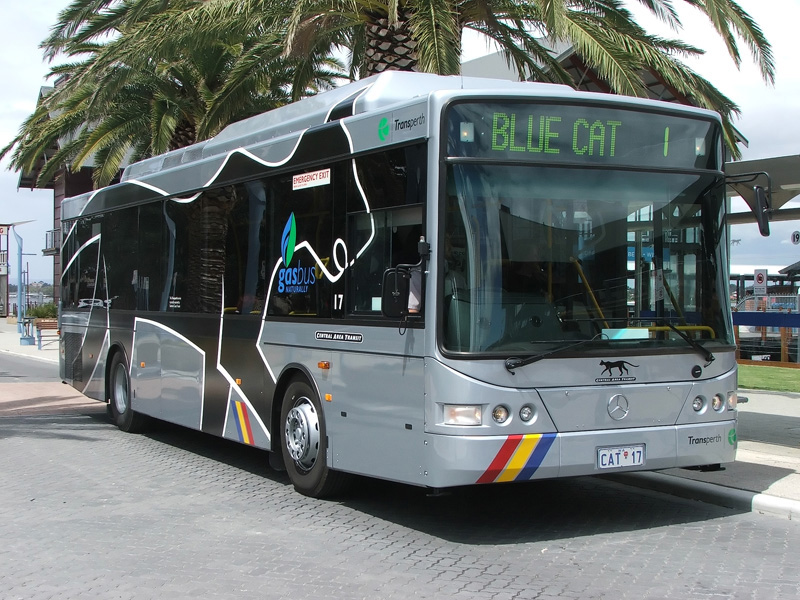
Volgren CR228L-bodied Mercedes-Benz OC500LE CNG formerly used on Perth CAT

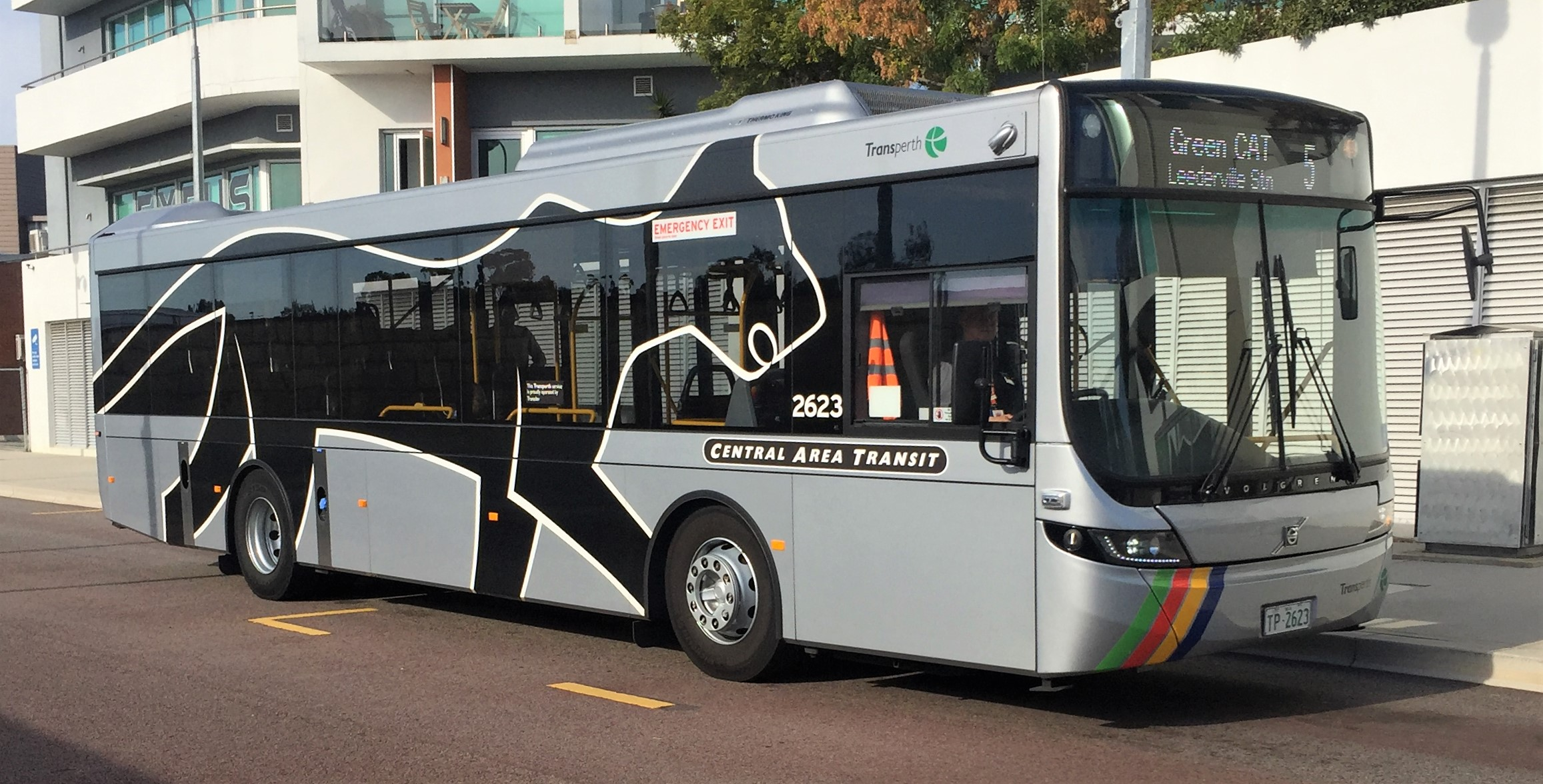
Volgren Optimus bodied Volvo B8RLE.

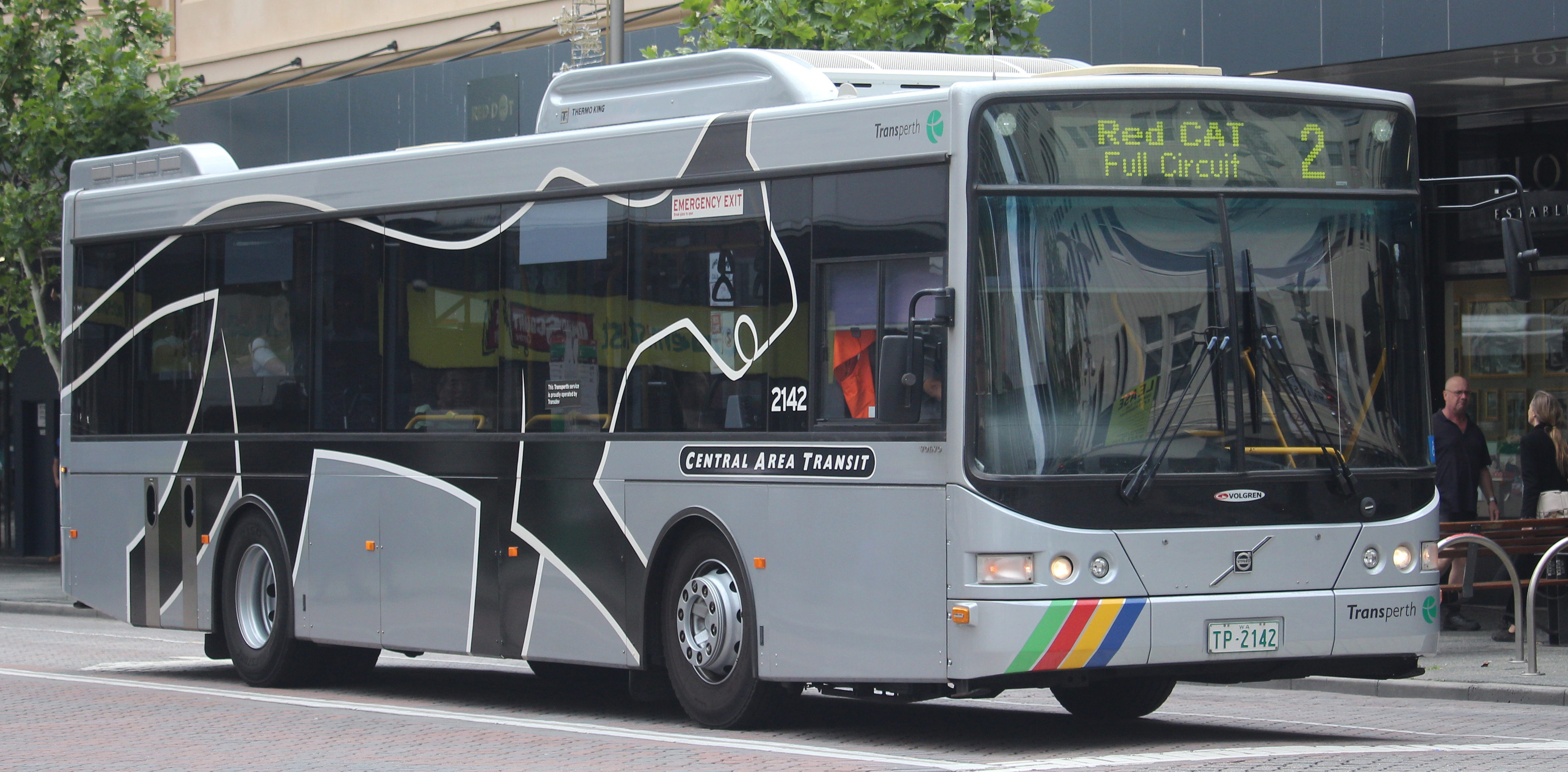
Volgren CR228L bodied Volvo B7RLE.

Fremantle CAT

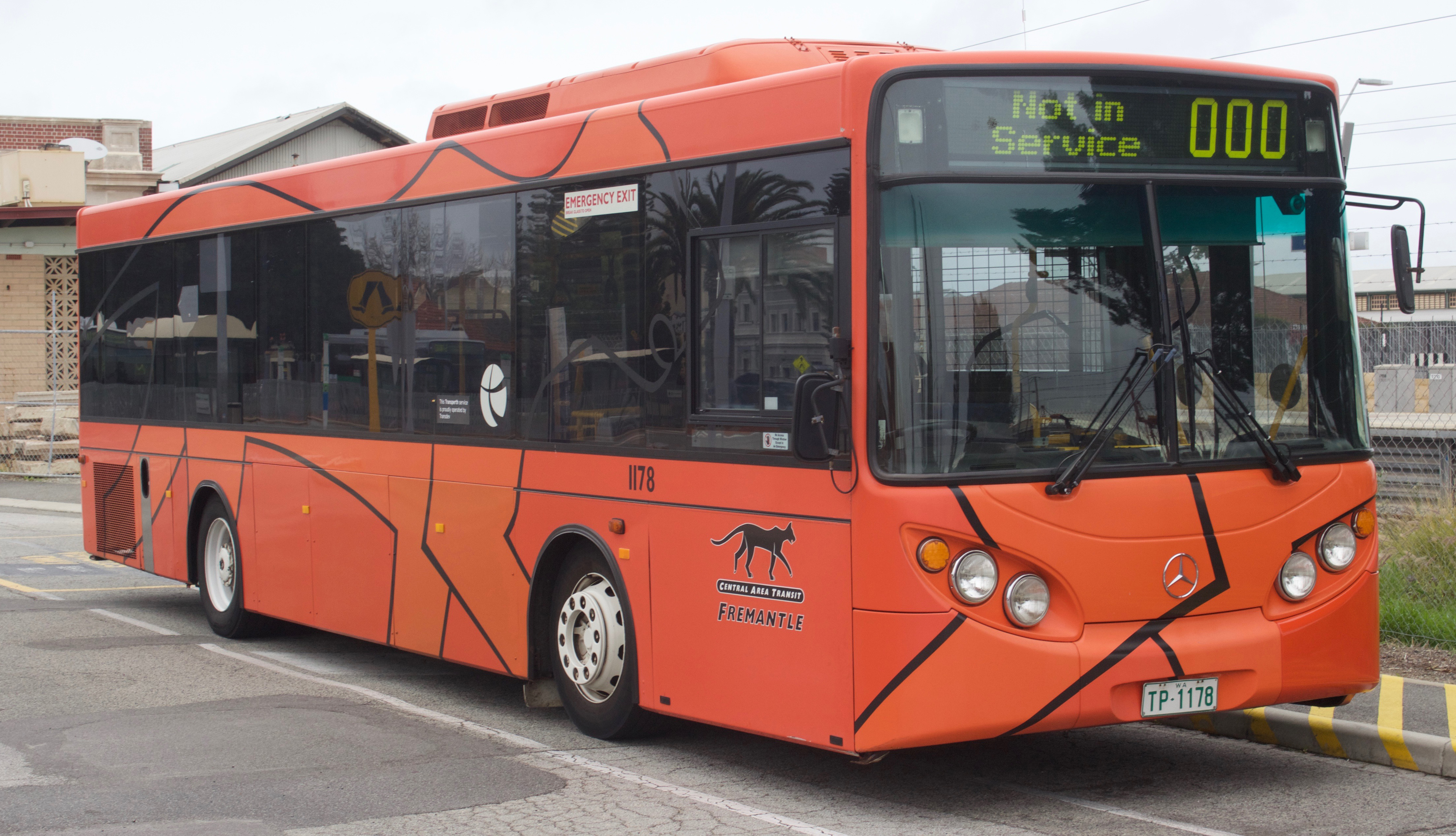
Volgren CR225L-bodied Mercedes-Benz O405NH formerly used by Fremantle CAT until 2017

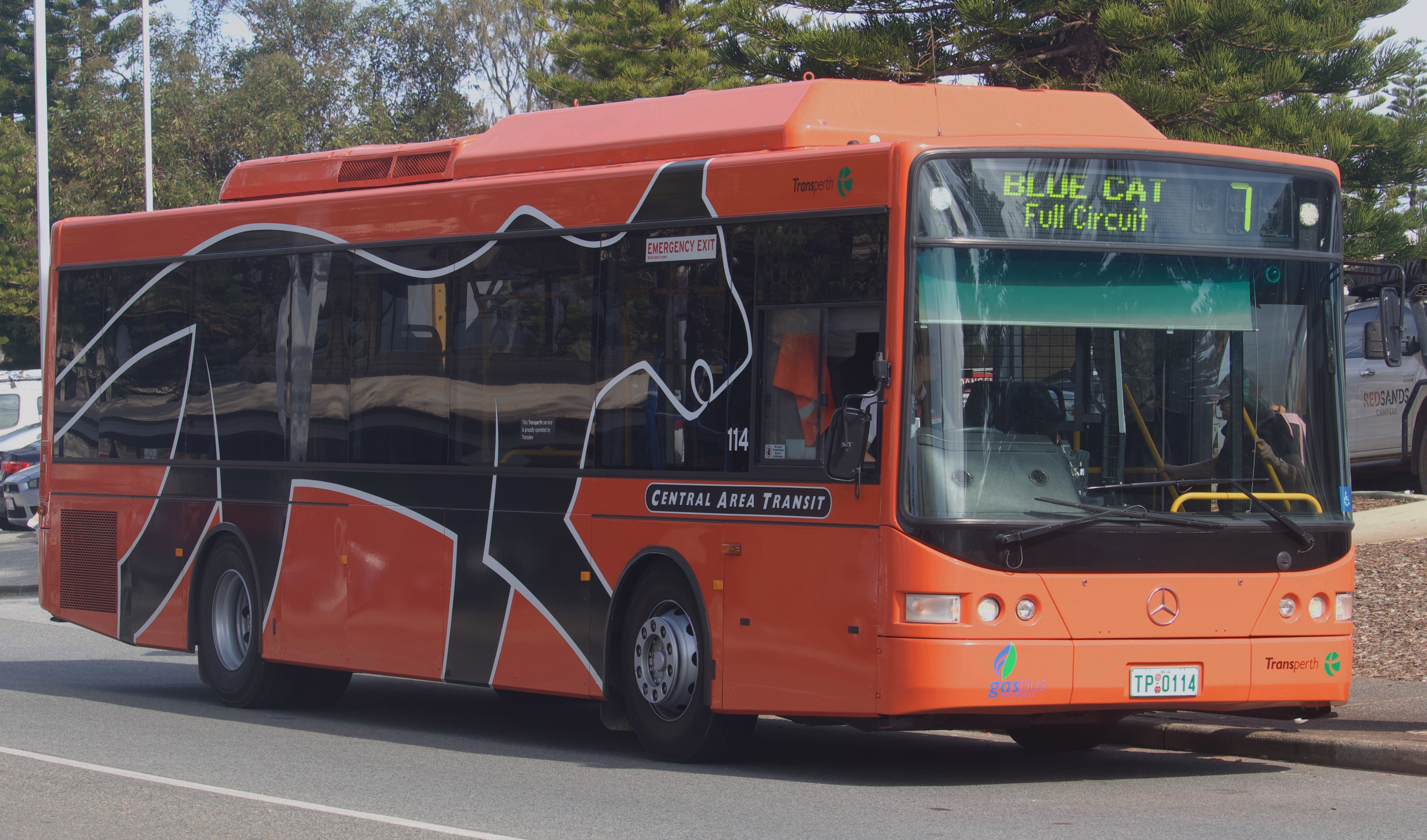
Volgren CR228L-bodied Mercedes-Benz OC500LE CNG, this was the last model used by the Fremantle Cat services.

== See also ==
- Buses in Perth
