= Transdev WA =

Bus operator in Western Australia

- Parent: Transdev Australasia
- Founded: 29 September 1996
- Service area: Perth
- Service type: Bus services
- Depots: 5
- Fleet: 398 (April 2020)
- Website: www.transdevwa.com.au

Transdev WA is an Australian bus company operating Transperth bus services under contract to the Public Transport Authority. It is a subsidiary of Transdev Australasia.

== History ==
On 29 September 1996, Transport Management Group Pty Limited (TMG), trading as Southern Coast Transit, commenced operating services in the Rockingham area from depots in Mandurah and Rockingham with 57 Mercedes-Benz and Renault buses. It was owned by Victorian bus operators the Donric Group and SkyBus.

In August 1997, two Denning double decker coaches were acquired from AAT Kings and Australian Pacific Touring to operate a Mandurah to Perth service. On 5 July 1998, Southern Coast was awarded the contract to operate Cockburn, Fremantle and the Perth CAT services, also awarded Belmont and Claremont area services as CGEA Group.

In June 1999, TMG including Southern Coast Transit was sold to National Express who in September 2004 sold it to Connex. It was rebranded as Veolia Transport and in July 2013 as Transdev Perth, then later as Transdev WA.

Connex had previously operated services in Perth as Perthbus (later Connex WA) since 1998, before selling its operations to Swan Transit in September 2002.

Between May 2011 and January 2020, Transdev operated the Joondalup area contract. Transdev lost the contract to Swan Transit on 19 January 2020.

As of July 2022, Transdev WA operates the Central Area Transit (Perth CAT), Fremantle and Rockingham area contracts. In July 2022, new bus contracts for Fremantle and Rockingham were awarded to Transdev for another 10 years, starting on 2 October 2022.

== Depots ==
Transdev WA operates five depots in East Perth, Mandurah, O'Connor (Fremantle), Rockingham and Pinjarra.
