= Ellenbrook transfer station =

Bus station in Henley Brook, Western Australia

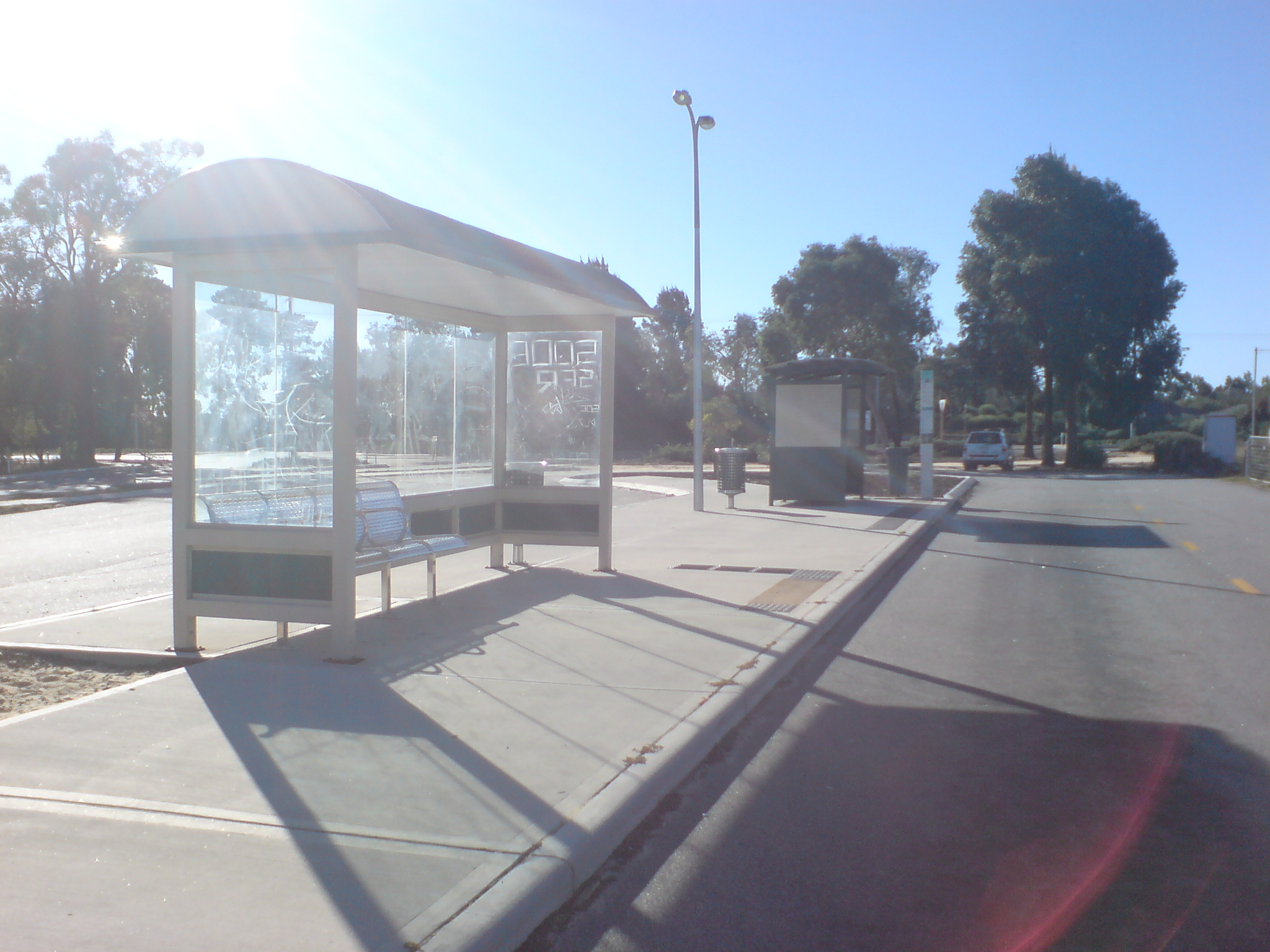

General information
- Location: Corner Lord Street and Gnangara Road; Henley Brook, Western Australia; Australia
- Coordinates: 31°47′47″S 115°57′46″E
- Owner: Public Transport Authority
- Operator: Transperth
- Bus routes: 6
- Bus stands: 3

Other information
- Fare zone: 3
Location

Ellenbrook Transfer Station was a Transperth bus station located on the corner of Lord Street and Gnangara Road, in Henley Brook, just south of Ellenbrook. It had 3 stands and was served by 7 Transperth routes operated by Swan Transit.

The transfer station opened in 2006, initially providing bus services to Ellenbrook, Midland, Bassendean, and Morley. In August 2017, bus route 355 was introduced, which travelled to the west of Whiteman to provide a more direct route to the north-western suburbs and to connect to the Joondalup line, halving the previous travel time.

The transfer station ceased operation on 2 November 2019, being replaced by Henley Brook Bus Station the next day.
