= Rockingham bus station =

Former bus station

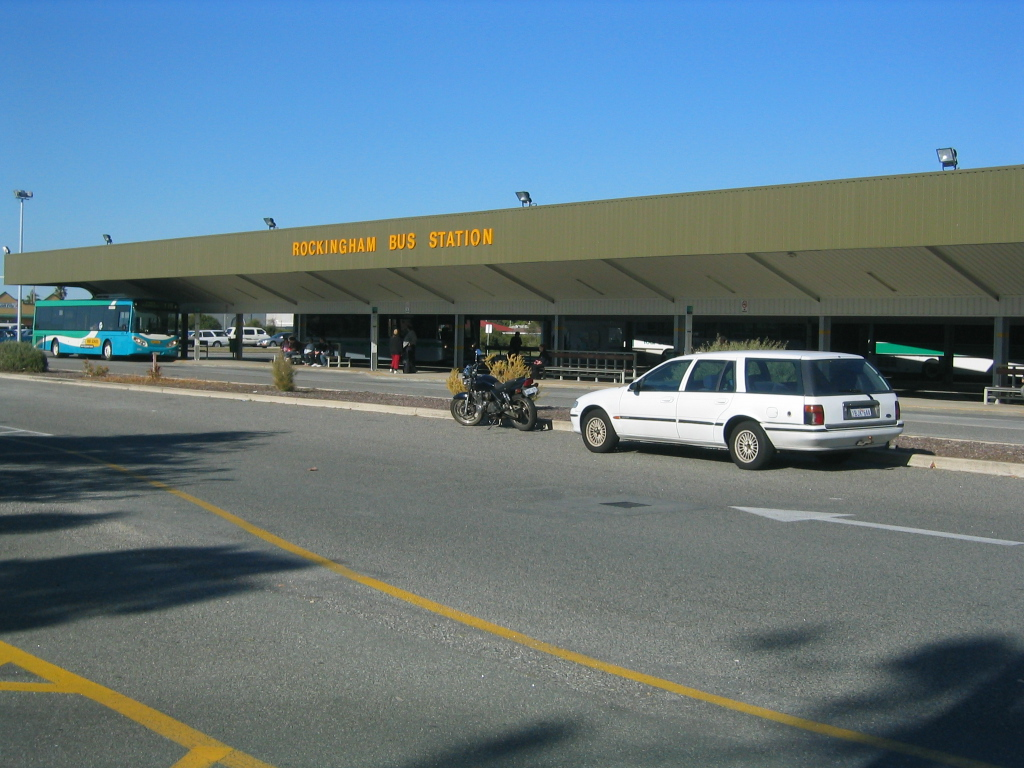

General information
- Location: Clifton Street, Rockingham; Australia
- Coordinates: 32°17′18″S 115°44′51″E
- Owner: Public Transport Authority
- Operator: Transperth
- Bus routes: 11 (October 2007)
- Bus stands: 12

Other information
- Fare zone: 5

History
- Opened: 8 May 1981
- Closed: 7 October 2007
Location

Rockingham bus station was a Transperth bus station located next to the Rockingham Centre, 47 kilometres (29 mi) south of Perth, Western Australia.

The original Rockingham bus station opened in November 1974.

A new station was opened on 8 May 1981 by the minister for transport, Cyril Rushton. This enabled Rockingham to receive more bus services to Perth and Fremantle, as well as new and increased suburban feeder routes through Rockingham.

It closed on 7 October 2007, being replaced by bus facilities at Rockingham railway station. It was demolished on 23 February 2008.
