= Perth Stadium bus station =

Bus station adjacent to Perth Stadium in Burswood, Western Australia

Coordinates: 31.954°S 115.890°E

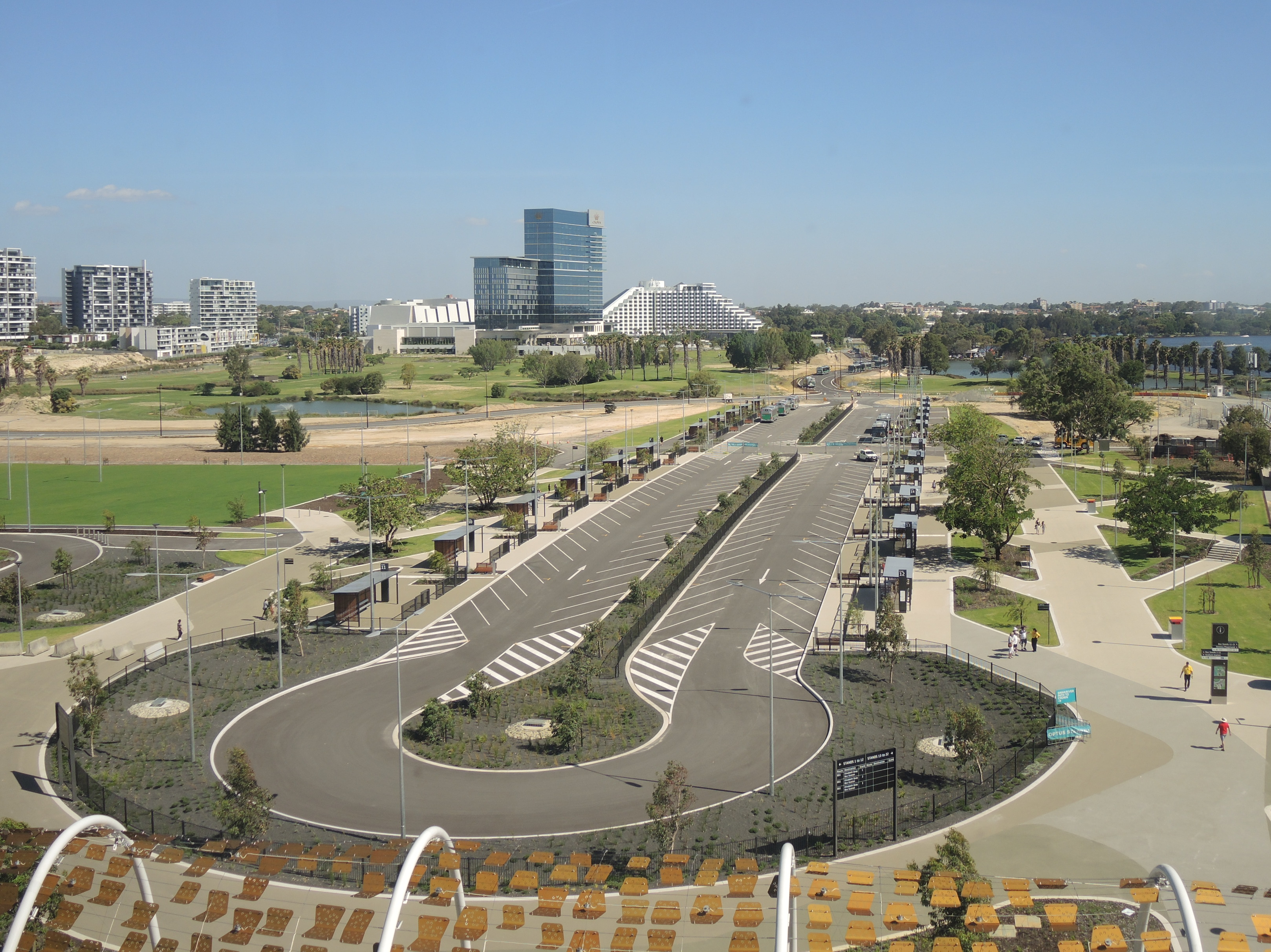
Perth Stadium Bus Station

Perth Stadium bus station is a Transperth bus station, located at the southern edge of Perth Stadium in Burswood, Western Australia. It has 22 stands and is served by eight Transperth special event routes.

== Bus routes ==
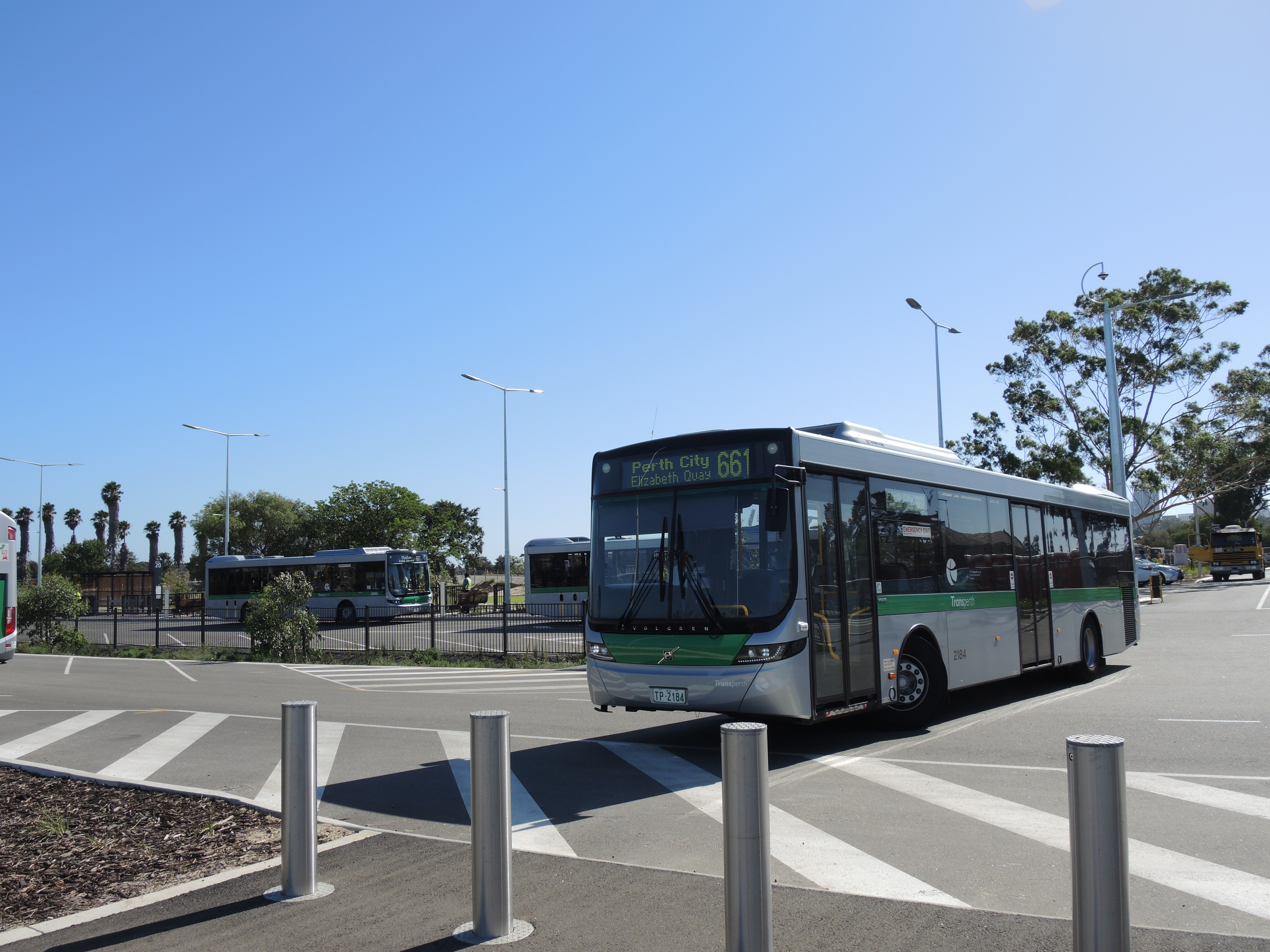
A route 661 bus to Elizabeth Quay at the bus station

As of 2019, ten bus routes service Perth Stadium Bus Station. These routes connect suburbs without train lines, and only operate before and after events at Perth stadium.

With the opening of the Matagarup Bridge on 14 July 2018, route 661 (Note: Route 661 previously connected Elizabeth Quay Bus Station to Perth Stadium Bus Station) was adjusted to service the bus stands near Matagarup Bridge on Nelson Avenue, East Perth. The opening of the bridge also caused the other suburban bus routes to change their bus stands at the bus station.

As of 13 March 2019, the route 655 had introduced to adding in the bus services to Kalamunda via Belmont and Forrestfield. While the route 661 no longer runs in circular and start and terminates at Brookfield Place in Perth CBD, and moved back the terminus from Matagarup Bridge bus stands to Perth Stadium Bus Station to make the room at Nelson Avenue for Taxis and on-demand public transport. Those changes are effective from 24 March 2019.

As of November 2023, The Armadale line shutdown has seen the withdrawal of the 661 with its last service on the last day of the Coldplay concert on 19 November. Instead more Red CATs will run to service the Matagarup Bridge instead. Additionally, a new route 651 will run from Armadale Station to Perth Stadium Bus Station, along with 652 and 653's terminus being shifted to the Matagarup Bridge.

Stop	Route	Destination / description	Notes
[27728] Stands 1, 2 & 3	659	Fremantle Station via Canning Highway and Canning Bridge bus station	
[27731] Stands 4 & 5	658	Hamilton Hill via Booragoon bus station and Kardinya Park	
[27733] Stands 6 & 7	655	Kalamunda Bus Station via Belmont, Forrestfield and High Wycombe Station	
[27735] Stands 8 & 9	657	Curtin University Bus Station via Curtin Central Bus Station	
[27737] Stands 10 & 11	656	Southlands Boulevarde via Bentley Plaza	
[27739] Stands 12 & 13	654	Bassendean Station via Great Eastern Highway	
[27741] Stands 14 & 15	652	Mirrabooka bus station via Alexander Drive	
[27743] Stands 16 & 17	653	Galleria bus station via Beaufort Street	
[27745] Stands 18, 19 & 20	650	Karrinyup bus station via Innaloo	
[27748] Stands 21 & 22	661	Brookfield Place, Perth CBD	

- Stop number are shown as the first stand of the stand group.
