= Henley Brook bus station =

Bus station in Perth, Western Australia

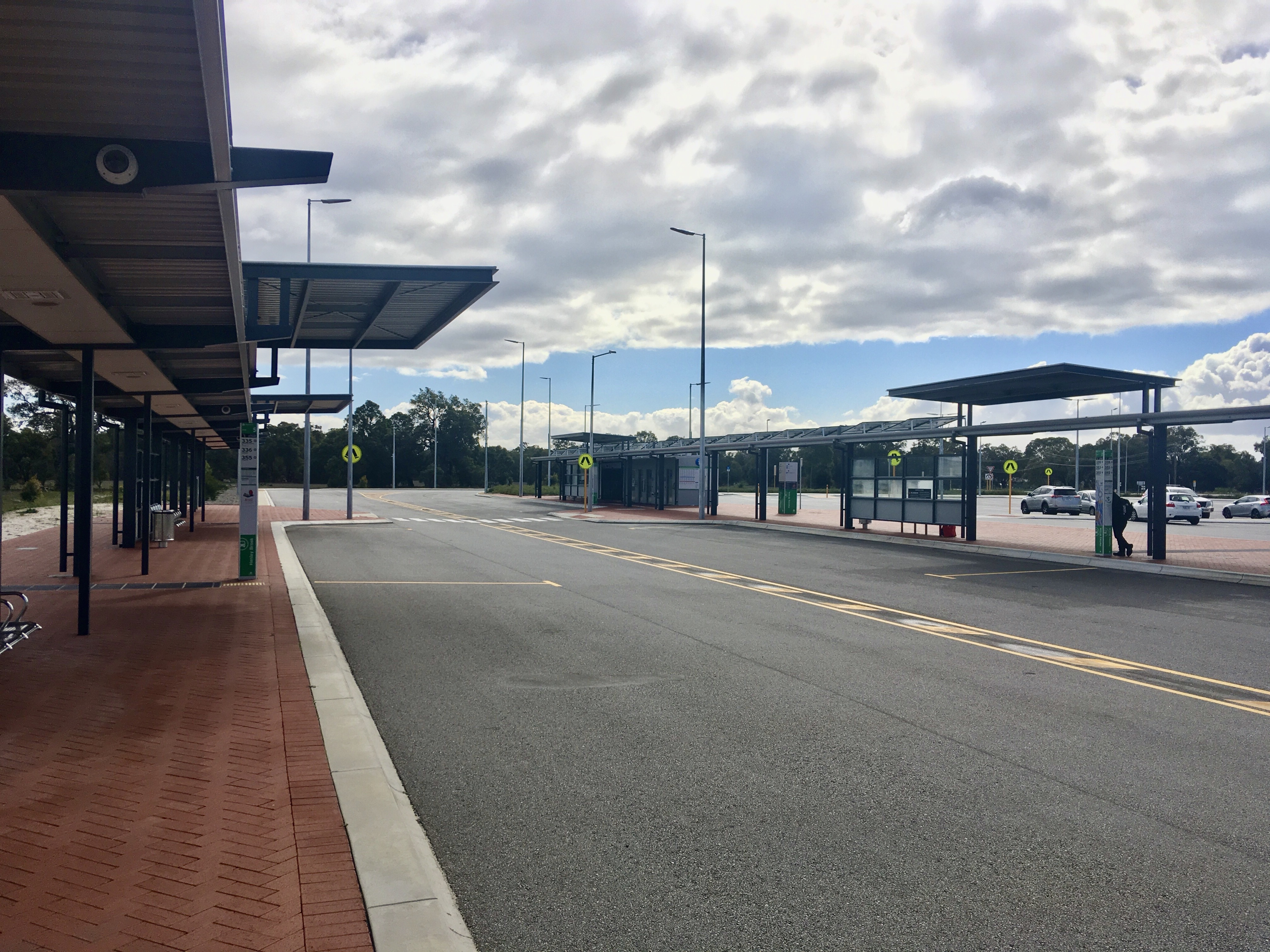

General information
- Location: Corner Henley Street and Starflower Road, Henley Brook; Western Australia; Australia
- Coordinates: 31°48′15″S 115°57′38″E
- Owner: Public Transport Authority
- Operator: Transperth
- Bus routes: 7
- Bus stands: 6

Other information
- Fare zone: 3

History
- Opened: 3 November 2019
- Closed: 9 December 2024
Location

Henley Brook bus station was a Transperth bus station located on the corner of Henley Street and Starflower Road, in Henley Brook, Perth, Western Australia. At the time of closure, it had six stands (five stands in use) served by six regular Transperth routes operated by Swan Transit.

== History ==
Henley Brook Bus Station was first mentioned as part of a proposal in November 2016 by the Barnett Liberal-National government to construct a bus rapid transit route to Ellenbrook. The following year in March 2017, the incoming Labor government modified the specifications of the BRT project to instead be constructed as a dual carriageway road to be able to handle more traffic and also make provision for the future Morley–Ellenbrook railway line which will be constructed as part of the Metronet project.

Henley Brook Bus Station opened on 3 November 2019, following the completion of the New Lord Street project.

In June 2024, construction commenced on a bus depot on the bus station's site. The station closed when the Ellenbrook line opened on 9 December 2024. The design and construction of the depot was done by BE Projects for A$9.2 million.

== Bus routes ==
At the time of closure, there were 6 regular bus routes servicing the station, 3 of which terminated here.

Route	Destination
[27941] Stand 1 - Set down only
[27942] Stand 2
335	Midland via West Swan Road
353	Bassendean Station via Partridge Street, Arthur Street and Lord Street
355	Whitfords Station via Gnangara Road, Distinction Road, Prindiville Drive and Whitfords Avenue
[27943] Stand 3
654	Optus Stadium via Bassendean station and Great Eastern Highway (Special events only)
674	HBF Park via Bassendean station and Guildford Road (Perth Glory matches only)
955	Galleria bus station via Bassendean station
[27944] Stand 4
337	Ellenbrook Central via Gnangara Road, Amethyst Parkway & The Promenade
338	Ellenbrook Central via Gnangara Road, Hancock Avenue & The Promenade
[27945] Stand 5
335	Ellenbrook Central via The Parkway
336	Ellenbrook via The Parkway & Ellenbrook Shops
355	Ellenbrook Central via Pinaster Parade and Main Street
[27946] Stand 6
654	Ellenbrook Central via Pinaster Parade and Main Street (Special events only)
674	Aveley via Ellenbrook Central, Millhouse Road, Amethyst Parkway and Flecker Promenade (Perth Glory matches only)
955	Annie's Landing, Ellenbrook North via The Broadway and Banrock Drive

== Gallery ==
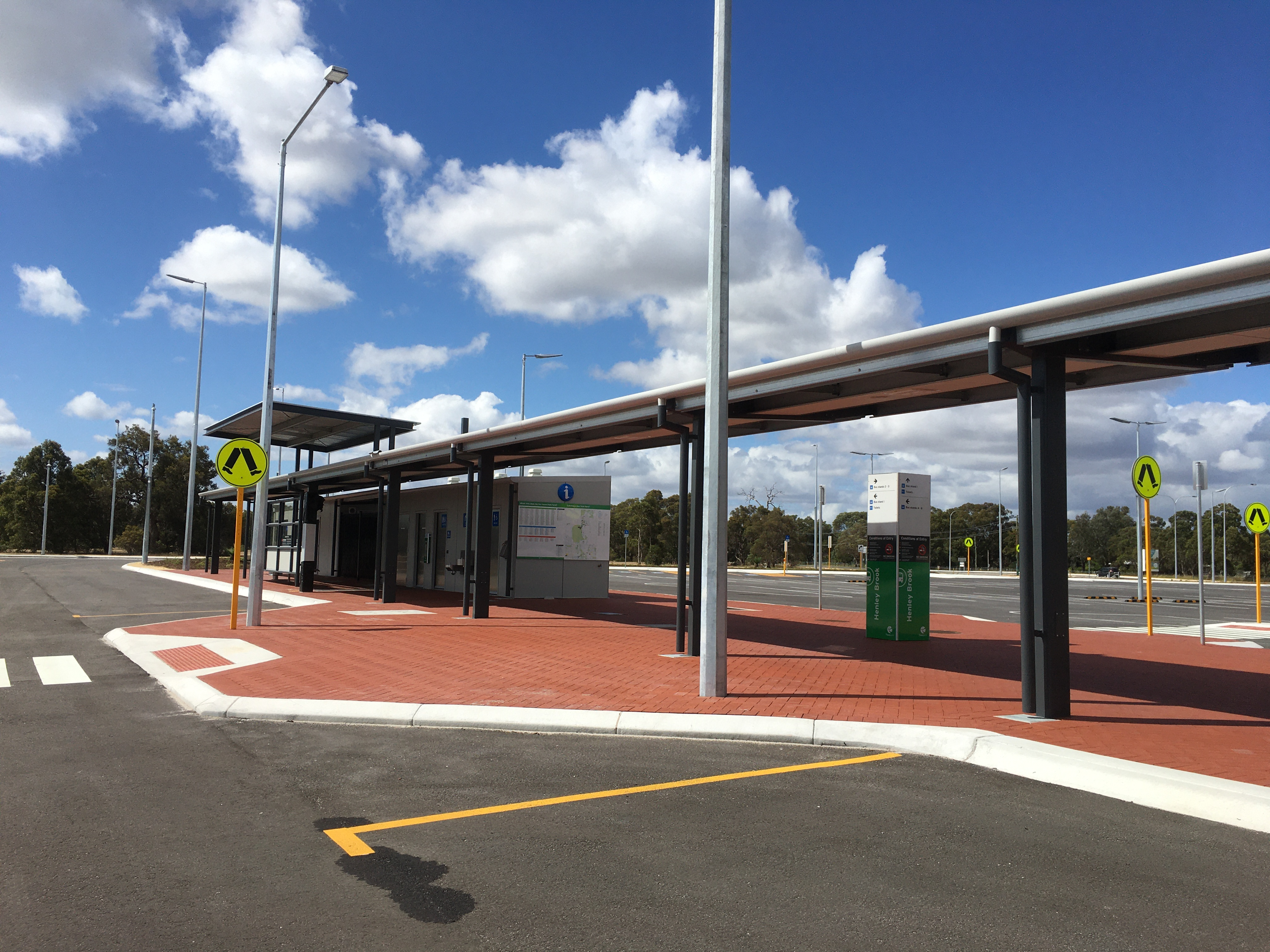
Stand 1

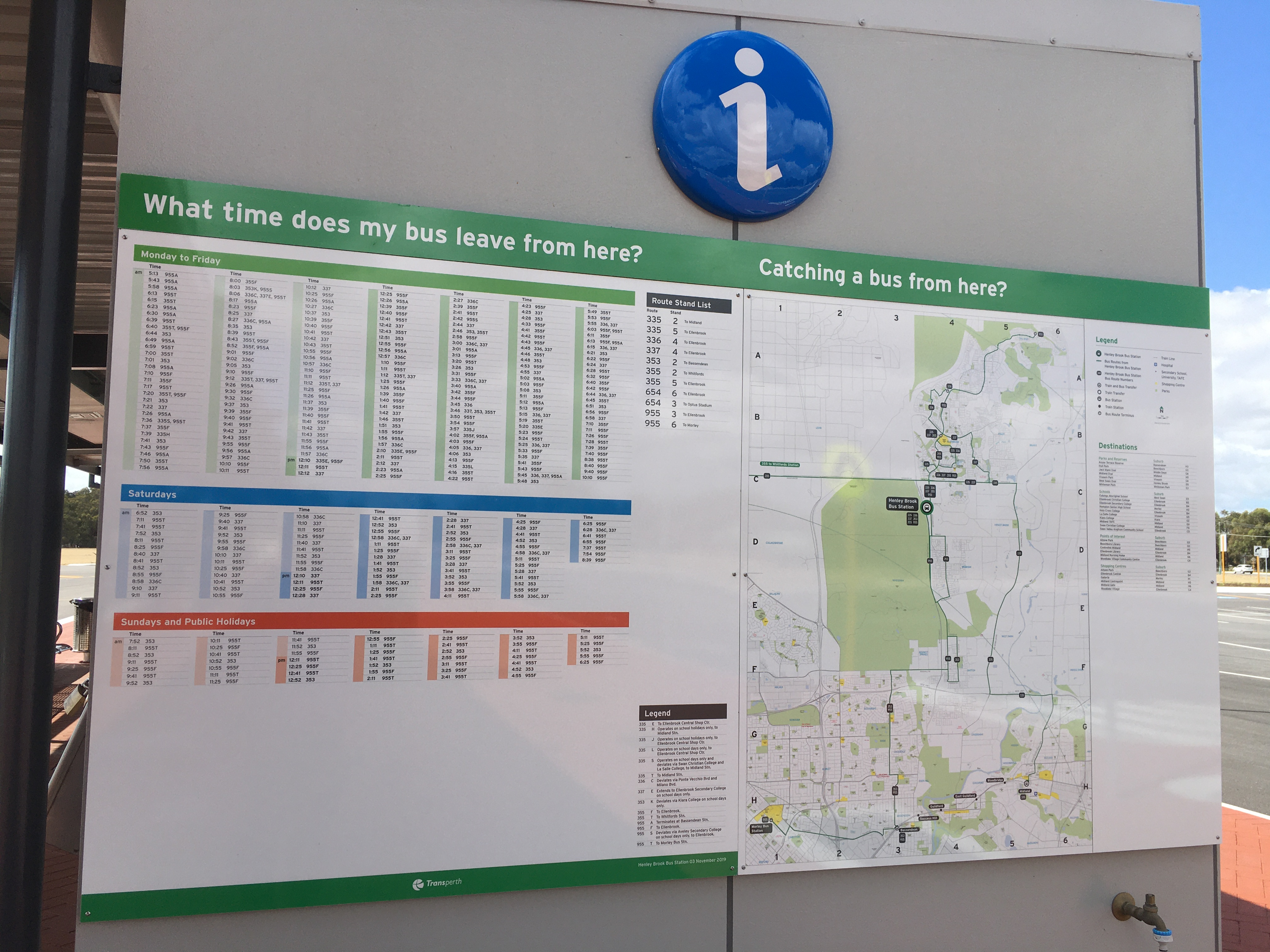
InfoZone
