= List of State Register of Heritage Places in the City of South Perth =

The State Register of Heritage Places is maintained by the Heritage Council of Western Australia. As of 2026, 204 places are heritage-listed in the City of South Perth, of which 21 are on the State Register of Heritage Places.

== List ==
The Western Australian State Register of Heritage Places, as of 2026, lists the following 21 state registered places within the City of South Perth:

Place name	Place #	Street number	Street name	Suburb or town	Co-ordinates	Notes & former names	Photo
Wesley College, Chapel & Memorial Rose Garden	2379	20	Coode Street	South Perth	31.978611°S 115.865278°E		
St Columba's Church Group & St Joseph's Convent, South Perth	2383	25	Forrest Street	South Perth	31.978395°S 115.859395°E		
St Mary's Anglican Church Complex	2385	9	Ridge Street	South Perth	31.982791°S 115.857744°E	Church Hall, St Mary's Church of the Virgin, St Mary's Close	
Old Mill Theatre	2389	Lot 429	Mends Street	South Perth	31.973683°S 115.851963°E	Mechanics' Institute, Mends St Mall, Miss Burnet's School, Neeamara	
South Perth Police Station (former)	2390	1	Mends Street	South Perth	31.973764°S 115.851249°E		
Windsor Hotel	2392	112	Mill Point Road	South Perth	31.9731°S 115.8523°E		
Old Council Offices	2393	111	Mill Point Road	South Perth	31.973397°S 115.852132°E	Roads Board Building, South Perth Heritage House	
Old Mill	2394	Lot 818, 833	Mill Point Road	South Perth	31.96616°S 115.84700°E	Shenton's Mill	
Administration Building and Chapel, Aquinas College	2396	58	Mt Henry Road	Salter Point	32.0256°S 115.8635°E		
Clontarf	2401	295	Manning Road	Waterford	32.015618°S 115.892823°E	Clontarf Campus, St Joseph's Boys Orphanage, Clontarf Boys Town	
Pagoda, Como	2403	111	Melville Parade	Como	31.990915°S 115.855236°E	Gordon's Tea Rooms, Stardust Room, Pagoda Long Bar & Restaurant	
Como Theatre	2404	16	Preston Street	Como	31.9935°S 115.8583°E	Como Theatre, entered register as Cygnet Cinema. Cygnet name was linked to tennant of 50 years 1960's to 2010's.	
Canning Bridge eastbound	4659		Canning Highway	Applecross and Como	32.010973°S 115.853232°E	MRWA No. 913, Canning Bridge northbound/downstream. This entry and 16178 are also listed under the City of Melville as the bridge links the Cities of Melville and South Perth	
Stidworthy Residence (former)	4689	130	Mill Point Road	South Perth	31.973744°S 115.853564°E	La Petite Noir, Ladislav's Restaurant	
Mount Henry Bridge	4794		Kwinana Freeway over the Canning River	Salter Point and Mount Pleasant	32.033889°S 115.858333°E		
Narrows Bridge	4795		Kwinana Freeway over the Swan River	Perth & South Perth	31.963598°S 115.846947°E	Bridge No 953	
Dennehy House (former)	4821	16	York Street	South Perth	31.978550°S 115.858711°E	Part of the St Columba's Church Group & St Joseph's Convent Precinct (2383)	
St Columba's Catholic Primary School	7474	30	York Street	South Perth	31.978266°S 115.860023°E	Part of the St Columba's Church Group & St Joseph's Convent Precinct (2383)	
Canning Bridge westbound	9192		Canning Highway	Applecross and Como	32.010973°S 115.853232°E	Canning Bridge upstream, MRWA No. 912	
Canning Bridge	16178		Canning Highway over the Canning River, between Applecross and Como	Applecross and Como	32.010973°S 115.853232°E	Westbound Upstream, ref 912, Eastbound Downstream, ref 913	
Saint Columba's Church	24521	25	Forrest Street	South Perth	31.978202°S 115.860369°E	Part of the St Columba's Church Group & St Joseph's Convent Precinct (2383)	
