= Head of the River (Western Australia) =

Rowing competition in Perth, Western Australia

The Head of the River rowing regatta in Western Australia is an annual rowing event held at the Champion Lakes Regatta Centre in Champion Lakes. There are two separate events. The boys regatta held in autumn, and the girls regatta held in winter.

== Boys Regatta ==
The Head of the River regatta is the last rowing event of the Public Schools Association (PSA) calendar. The boys regatta held in early autumn is contested between the seven PSA boys schools: Aquinas College, Christ Church Grammar School, Guildford Grammar School, Hale School, Scotch College, Trinity College, and Wesley College.

The boys regatta for Head of the River was first held in 1899 between CBC Perth, The Church of England Grammar School (renamed Guildford Grammar School in 1906), The Alexander Scotch College (name shortened to Scotch College in 1908), and The High School (renamed Hale School in 1929).

Originally, the race for Head of the River was held between coxed fours from each school and the winning crew was awarded the Challenge Cup. When the PSA formed in 1905 rowing was one of the five inaugural sports of the competition and the Challenge Cup was awarded as a PSA trophy. In 1938 the Challenge Cup changed to the current race format between the first coxed eights from each school. Over the years the number of rowing events increased. In 1982 the Hamer Cup was introduced and awarded annually to the school which scored the most points for placings in each event at the regatta.

The course has changed many times. The regatta was originally held on the Swan River. When Perth won the 1962 British Empire and Commonwealth Games, the regatta moved to the 6 lane Canning River course. In 1969 the event returned to the wider course on the Swan River at the base of Kings Park near the Narrows Bridge. Since 2009 the event has been held at the purpose built rowing course at Champion Lakes, Kelmscott. Records have tumbled since the venue change with records set in 2009 and 2010. The current record time for the 2000m event is 5 minutes 48.2 seconds, set by Trinity College.

=== Challenge Cup ===
1st IV winners 1899-1937 & 1st VIII winners 1938–present

Year	Winner
1899	The High School
1900	CBC Perth
1901	The Alexander Scotch College
1902	The Church of England Grammar School
1903	The Alexander Scotch College
1904	The Alexander Scotch College
1905	The High School
1906	The Alexander Scotch College
1907	The Alexander Scotch College
1908	Scotch
1909	CBC Perth
1910	CBC Perth
1911	CBC Perth
1912	CBC Perth
1913	Scotch
1914	The High School
1915	CBC Perth
1916	CBC Perth
1917	CBC Perth
1918	The High School
1919	The High School
1920	Scotch
1921	CBC Perth
1922	The High School
1923	CBC Perth
1924	Guildford
1925	The High School
1926	CBC Perth
1927	CBC Perth
1928	CBC Perth
1929	CBC Perth
1930	CBC Perth
1931	CBC Perth
1932	Scotch
1933	Hale
1934	Scotch
1935	Scotch
1936	Scotch
1937	Scotch
1938	Scotch
1939	Hale
1940	Scotch
1941	Scotch
1942	Aquinas (unofficial)
1943	Aquinas
1944	Hale
1945	Hale
1946	Aquinas
1947	Hale
1948	Aquinas
1949	Aquinas
1950	Hale
1951	Hale
1952	Hale
1953	Hale
1954	Hale
1955	Hale
1956	Hale
1957	Scotch
1958	Christ Church
1959	Christ Church
1960	Scotch
1961	Christ Church
1962	Guildford
1963	Christ Church
1964	Christ Church
1965	Aquinas
1966	Aquinas
1967	Christ Church / Scotch
1968	Scotch
1969	Aquinas
1970	Aquinas
1971	Hale
1972	Aquinas
1973	Aquinas
1974	Aquinas
1975	Aquinas
1976	Aquinas
1977	Aquinas
1978	Scotch
1979	Christ Church
1980	Aquinas
1981	Christ Church
1982	Aquinas
1983	Hale
1984	Scotch
1985	Scotch
1986	Christ Church
1987	Aquinas
1988	Guildford
1989	Aquinas
1990	Scotch
1991	Hale
1992	Christ Church
1993	Guildford
1994	Aquinas
1995	Aquinas
1996	Trinity
1997	Aquinas
1998	Aquinas
1999	Trinity
2000	Hale
2001	Wesley
2002	Christ Church
2003	Christ Church
2004	Trinity
2005	Christ Church
2006	Christ Church
2007	Trinity
2008	Christ Church
2009	Trinity
2010	Trinity
2011	Christ Church
2012	Christ Church
2013	Trinity
2014	Christ Church
2015	Scotch
2016	Trinity
2017	Guildford
2018	Hale
2019	Christ Church
2020 †	N/A
2021	Scotch
2022	Christ Church
2023	Trinity
2024	Hale
2025	Christ Church
2026	Aquinas

NB: † Denotes no race

=== Challenge Cup tally ===
Wins	School
39	Aquinas
26	Scotch
25	Hale
21	Christ Church
9	Trinity
6	Guildford
1	Wesley

- Aquinas includes seventeen wins by CBC Perth during 1899-1937.
- Guildford includes one win by The Church of England Grammar School during 1899-1905.
- Hale includes seven wins by The High School during 1899-1928.
- Scotch includes five wins by The Alexander Scotch College during 1899-1907.

=== Hamer Cup ===
Overall points

Year	Winner
1982	Scotch
1983	Aquinas
1984	Scotch
1985	Aquinas
1986	Aquinas
1987	Aquinas
1988	Aquinas
1989	Aquinas
1990	Aquinas
1991	Aquinas
1992	Guildford
1993	Aquinas
1994	Aquinas
1995	Aquinas
1996	Aquinas
1997	Aquinas
1998	Aquinas
1999	Aquinas
2000	Hale
2001	Guildford/Hale
2002	Trinity
2003	Trinity
2004	Trinity
2005	Christ Church
2006	Scotch
2007	Trinity
2008	Trinity
2009	Scotch
2010	Trinity
2011	Trinity
2012	Trinity
2013	Guildford
2014	Scotch
2015	Trinity
2016	Trinity
2017	Trinity
2018	Christ Church
2019	Trinity
2020 †	N/A
2021	Trinity
2022	Trinity
2023	Trinity
2024	Trinity
2025	Trinity/Christ Church
2026	Trinity

NB: † Denotes no racing

=== Hamer Cup tally ===
Wins	School
18	Trinity
15	Aquinas
5	Scotch
3	Guildford
3	Christ Church
2	Hale
0	Wesley

== Girls Regatta ==
In the winter season several private Perth girls schools in the Independent Girls Schools Sports Association (IGSSA) race for the title.

=== 1st VIII winners ===
Year	Winner
1988	St Hilda's
1989	Perth College
1990	Penrhos
1991	Penrhos
1992	Penrhos
1993	Penrhos
1994	MLC
1995	MLC
1996	MLC
1997	MLC
1998	Penrhos
1999	St Hilda's
2000	St Hilda's
2001	MLC
2002	MLC
2003	MLC
2004	MLC
2005	Penrhos
2006	MLC
2007	Perth College
2008	Perth College
2009	MLC
2010	MLC
2011	MLC
2012	PLC
2013	PLC
2014	MLC
2015	PLC
2016	PLC
2017	PLC
2018	PLC
2019	PLC
2020	N/A
2021	PLC
2022	PLC
2023	PLC
2024	PLC
2025	PLC

=== 1st VIII Trophy Tally ===
Wins	School
13	MLC
12	PLC
6	Penrhos
3	St Hilda's
3	Perth College
0	Iona

=== Overall points score ===
Year	Premiers	Zuideveld Trophy
1988	Perth College	
1989	Perth College	
1990	Penrhos	
1991	Penrhos	
1992	Penrhos	
1993	Penrhos	
1994	Penrhos	
1995	Penrhos	
1996	PLC	PLC
1997	Penrhos	St Hilda's
1998	St Hilda's	Penrhos
1999	Penrhos	St Hilda's
2000	St Hilda's	St Hilda's
2001	Penrhos	Perth College
2002	Perth College	Perth College
2003	Perth College	Perth College
2004	PLC	St Hilda's
2005	Penrhos	Penrhos
2006	Perth College/Penrhos	Penrhos
2007	Penrhos	Penrhos
2008	Perth College	Perth College
2009	Penrhos	Penrhos
2010	Penrhos	PLC
2011	Perth College	Perth College
2012	PLC	PLC
2013	PLC	PLC
2014	PLC	PLC
2015	PLC	PLC
2016	PLC	PLC
2017	PLC	PLC
2018	PLC	PLC
2019	PLC	PLC
2020	N/A	N/A
2021	PLC	PLC
2022	PLC	PLC
2023	PLC	PLC
2024	PLC	PLC
2025	PLC	PLC

=== Premiers Tally ===
Wins	School
15	PLC
14	Penrhos
7	Perth College
2	St Hilda's
0	Iona
0	MLC

=== Zuideveld Trophy Tally ===
Wins	School
15	PLC
5	Penrhos
5	Perth College
4	St Hilda's
0	Iona
0	MLC

== See also ==
- Head of the River (Australia)
- Public Schools Association
- Independent Girls Schools Sports Association (Perth)
