= Champion Lakes Regatta Centre =

Man made aquatic sports facility in Perth, Western Australia

Coordinates: 32°6′28″S 115°59′45″E

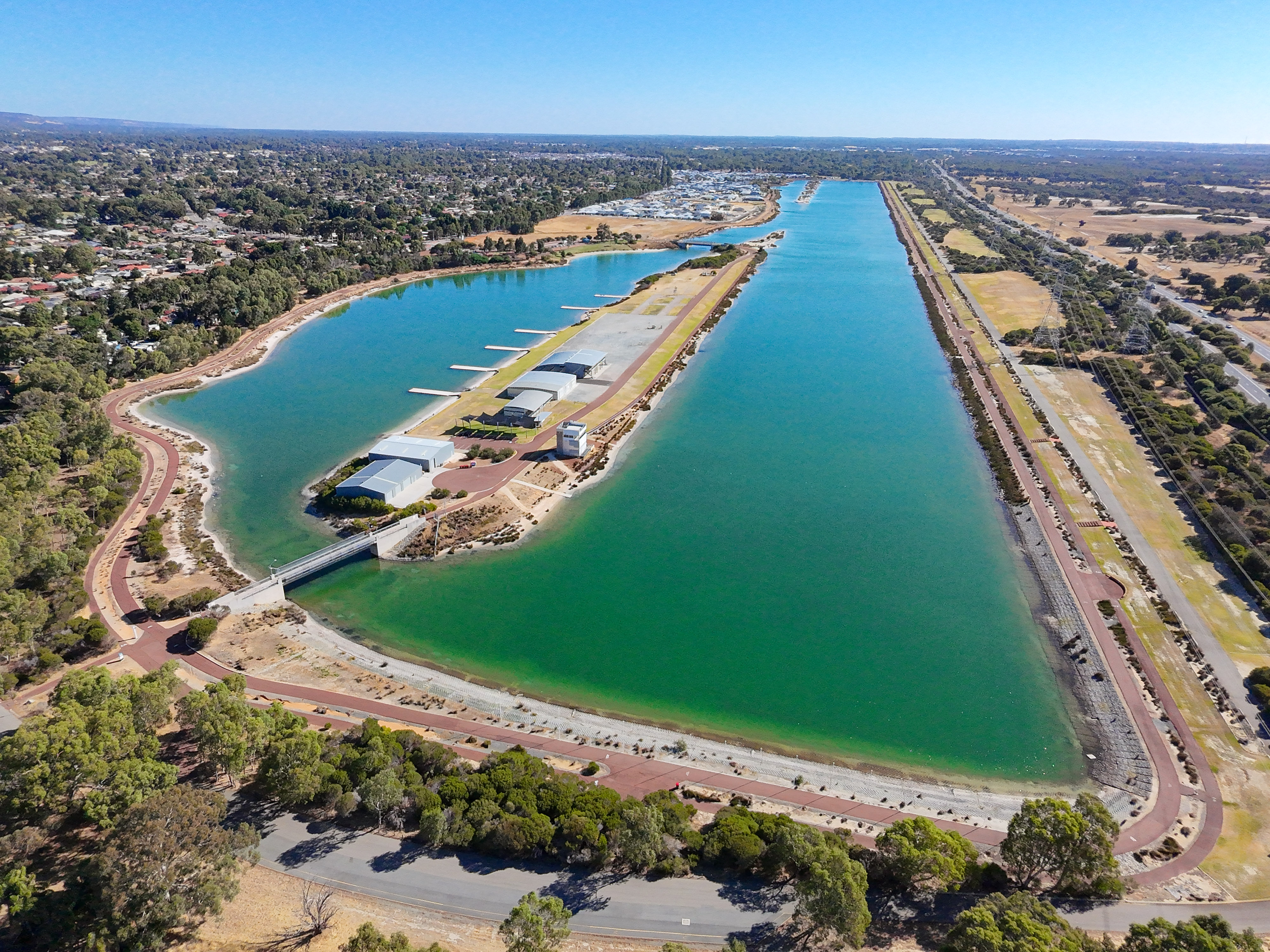
Champion Lakes Regatta Centre

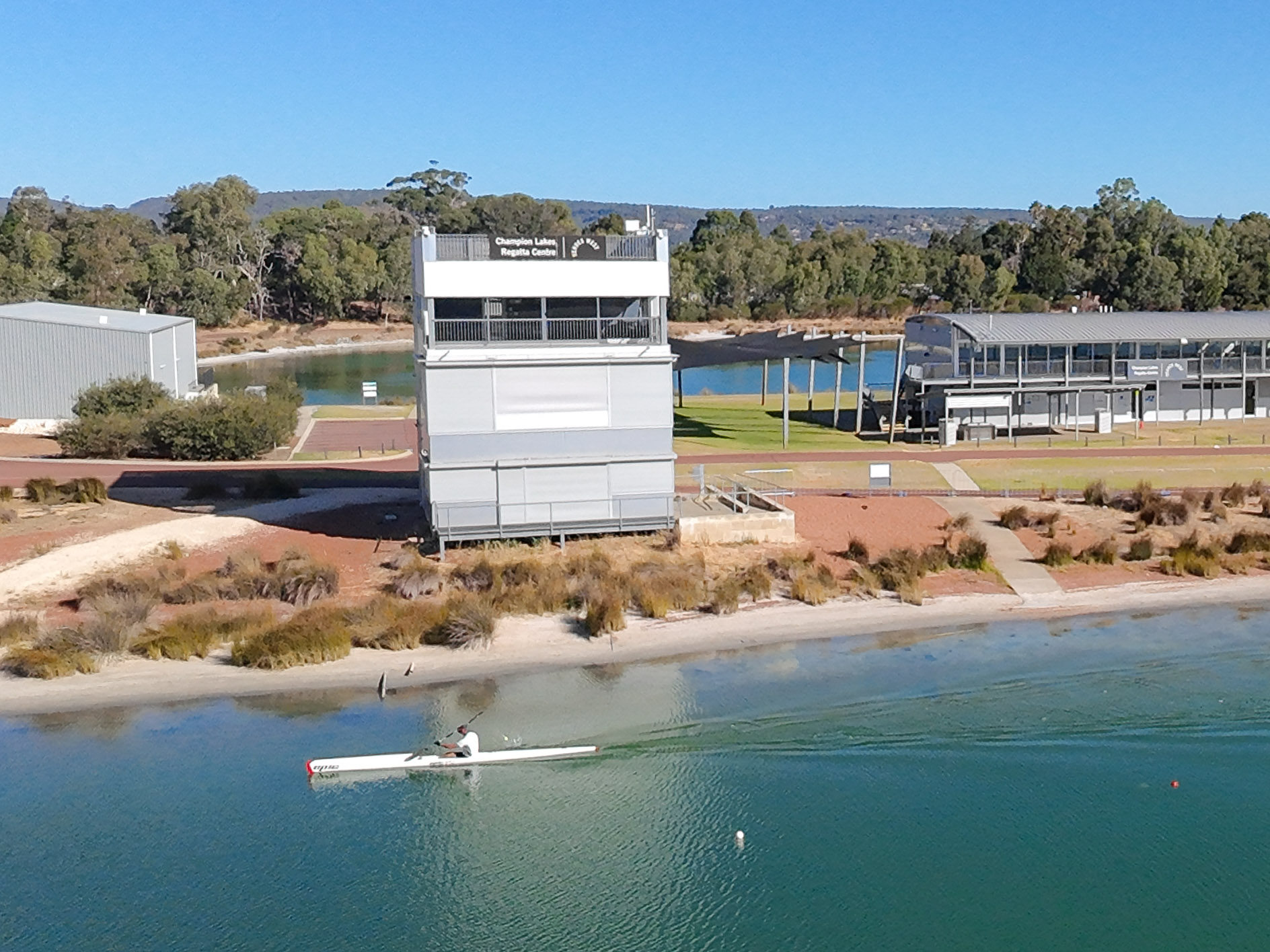
Facilities buildings at the centre

Champion Lakes Regatta Centre (colloquially referred to as Champion Lakes) is an aquatic sporting facility south of Perth, Western Australia in the suburb of Champion Lakes. It is an international standard facility for rowing, kayaking and dragon boat racing and includes a 2,000-metre (6,600 ft) buoyed course for competition.

The facility is situated adjacent to Tonkin Highway and was officially opened on 30 January 2009. It cost approximately A$30 million to construct. The centre is open to the public all days of the week.

The establishment of the Champion Lakes Regatta Centre has provided students from schools like Kelmscott Senior High School with opportunities to participate in rowing competitions held most Saturdays during the school year.

== Previous events ==
- PSA Head of the River — 28 March 2009
- Australian Masters Rowing Regatta — 3–6 June 2010
- Australian Rowing Championships — 5–1 March 2012
