= Public school =

Public school may refer to:

- Public school (government-funded), a no-fee school, publicly funded and operated by the government
- Public school (United Kingdom), certain elite fee-charging private schools in England and Wales
- Great Public Schools, independent non-government fee-charging (mainly boys') elite schools in New South Wales, Australia originally established on the basis of Christian denominations
- Public Schools Association, a group of seven independent boys' schools in Perth, Western Australia
- Associated Public Schools of Victoria, a group of eleven elite schools in Victoria, Australia
- Public school (India), a group of historically elite fee-charging privately owned and managed schools in India

== See also ==
- Public university, in many countries the designation for any university operated by the government as opposed to a privately owned organization
- Independent school, school that is not dependent upon the state
- Private university, higher education institution not operated by a government
