= Paul Nunan =

Brother Paul Nunan, CFC
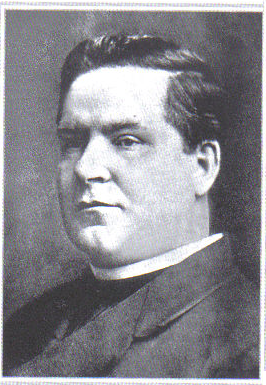
- Paul Nunan
- Born: c.1858 Ireland
- Died: 5 November 1934; Ballarat, Victoria
- Occupations: Educator, Christian Brother

Michael Paul Nunan, CFC (1858 – 5 November 1934) was a member of the Congregation of Christian Brothers and an influential educationalist in New Zealand, Victoria and, especially, Western Australia.

== Personal life ==
Born around 1858, after a three-year illness he died at St Patrick's College, Monday, 5 November 1934 aged 76 years. He was buried as Michael Paul Nunan at Ballaarat New Cemetery. He arrived in Australia with his parents 1873 from Ireland, part of education was at the Christian Brothers College, Victoria Parade, East Melbourne. He retired to live at St Patrick's College, Ballarat Vic 3350 (Australia)

== Career ==
He joined the Christian Brothers and served at Ballarat Vic 3350, Brisbane in Qld and Sydney of NSW. Appointed headmaster to Perth, Western Australia in 1897 he stayed until 1907 then re-appointed in 1912 he served again 1913-1921

Nunan was one of the pioneering Christian Brothers who taught at Christian Brothers School, Dunedin from 1876 until 1883. He arrived in Dunedin eight months after the foundation Christian Brothers community led by Brother Fursey Bodkin. Nunan was an influential headmaster of Christian Brothers College, Perth, where he served from 1897 to 1908, 1912–1918 and 1920–21. He was one of the four headmasters who inaugurated the Public Schools Association in Western Australia. He was a member of the Royal commission that established the University of Western Australia. He was also headmaster of St Patrick's College, Ballarat 1910–1912. A boarding house at Aquinas College, Perth was named Nunan Residence in recognition of his work at Christian Brothers College, Perth.
