= Jeremy Allanson =

Australian judge

Jeremy Allanson is a former justice of the Supreme Court of Western Australia. He is a graduate of Trinity College and the University of Western Australia. Allanson was admitted to practice as a lawyer in Western Australia in 1981 and worked for the State Solicitor's Office until 1994, when he joined the independent Bar. He was appointed as Senior Counsel in 2007.

As of 21 February 2023, he retired from the Supreme Court of Western Australia, with Fiona Seaward being appointed to fill his vacancy.
