= Edmund Rice Administration Wing =

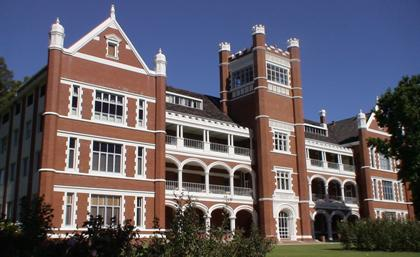
- The front façade of Aquinas College

General information
- Type: Administration building
- Location: Aquinas College Campus, Western Australia
- Coordinates: 32.0256°S 115.8635°E

Western Australia Heritage Register
- Official name: Administration Building and Chapel, Aquinas College
- Type: State Registered Place
- Designated: 17 December 2010
- Reference no.: 2396

The Edmund Rice Administration Wing, commonly known as the Castle, is a heritage listed building located at Mount Henry Road in Salter Point and the focal point of the Aquinas College Campus. Built in 1937, the Castle was the first building completed on the campus. It is owned by the Christian Brothers as part of the Aquinas College property.

== History ==
The Castle was designed by Cavanagh and Cavanagh, and built over several stages; the tower and south wing were first to be completed in 1937. The north wing, anticipated in the original plans, was designed by Henderson & Thompson and completed in 1967. Deliberate efforts were made to design the north wing to echo the style, form and established materials of the original south wing, presenting visually, a three-storey façade, which conceal what is actually a four-storey building. It was funded largely by donations and from money obtained from the sale of some of the original 95 hectares (234 acres) purchased by the Christian Brothers in 1928. The building was heritage listed by the Heritage Council of Western Australia on 1 May 1989.

== Gallery ==
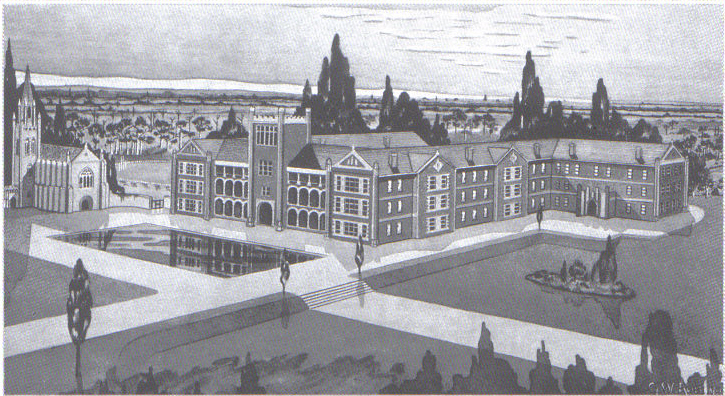
Artist's impression of Aquinas College (1937)

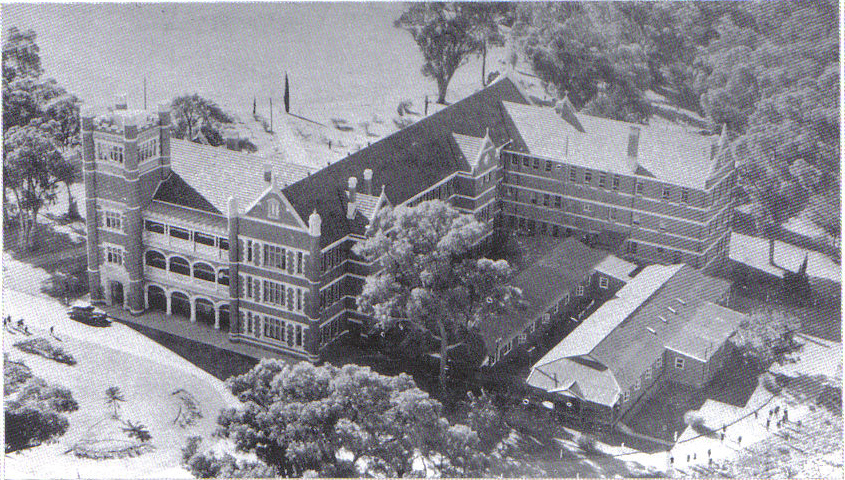
Administration wing with temporary boarding accommodation (1949)

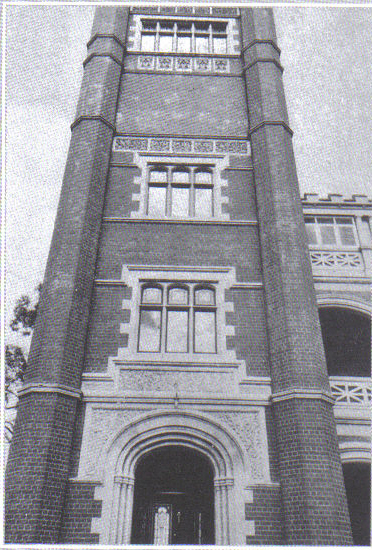
The tower of the Castle (1952)

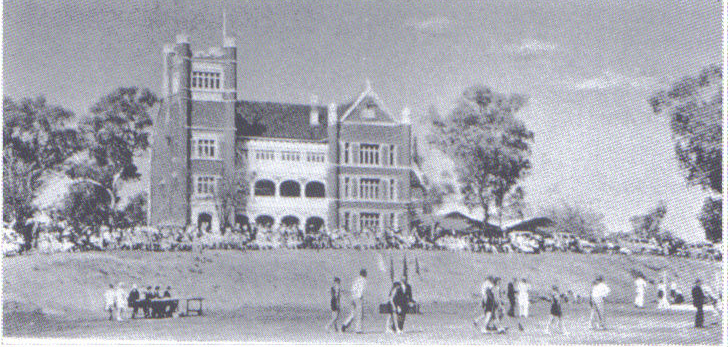
The Edmund Rice wing (1954)
