= Trinity College, Perth =

Trinity College

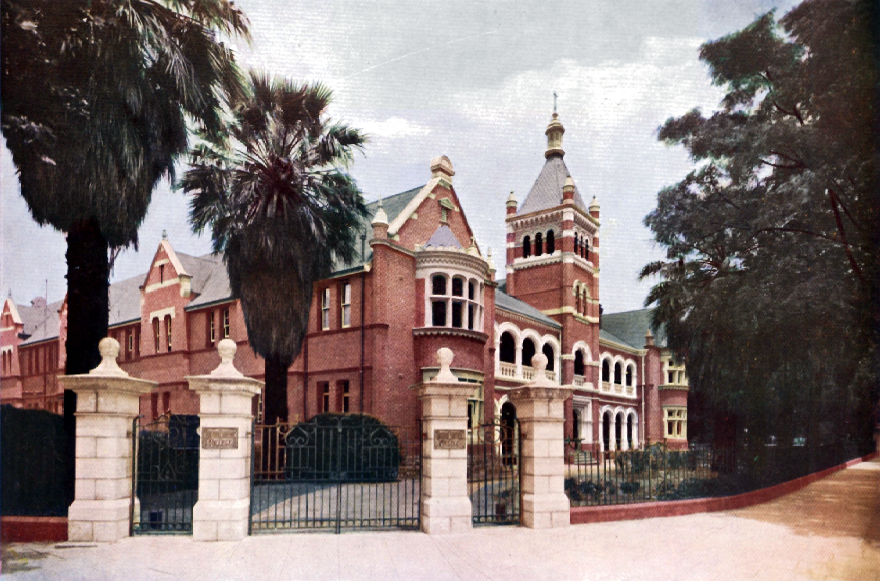
- CBC Perth building at St Georges Terrace demolished in the 1960s

Location
- East Perth, Western Australia; Australia; 31°57′36″S 115°52′57″E

Information
- Type: Independent primary and secondary day school
- Motto: Latin: In Nomine Domini (In The Name of the Lord)
- Religious affiliation: Catholicism
- Denomination: Congregation of Christian Brothers
- Established: 1962; 64 years ago
- Sister school: Mercedes College, Perth
- Trust: Edmund Rice Education Australia
- Principal: Darren O'Neill
- Staff: ~150
- Years offered: 4–12
- Gender: Boys
- Enrolment: ~1,200 (2007)
- Colours: Royal blue, pale blue, and emerald green
- Affiliations: Association of Heads of Independent Schools of Australia (AHISA); Association of Independent Schools of Western Australia (AISWA); Junior School Heads Association of Australia (JSHAA); Public Schools Association (PSA)
- Alumni: Trinity Old Boys
- Website: www.trinity.wa.edu.au

Trinity College is an independent day school for boys, located on the Swan River foreshore in East Perth, Western Australia. The school was established in 1962 when students from the city schools CBC Perth and St Patrick's Boys School moved to the new Trinity College campus.

Trinity College is commonly shortened to Trinity or TC. Former students of Trinity are called Trinity Old Boys. Trinity is a school in the Edmund Rice tradition promoting classic and modern education, culture, dance, drama, music, service to others, spirituality, sport, and vocation. Trinity comprises an East Perth campus with a junior school for Years 4 to 6, a middle school for Years 7 to 8, and a senior school for Years 9 to 12; an outdoor education wilderness at Camp Kelly Dwellingup; and sporting grounds at Waterford.

== History ==
=== CBC Perth and St Patrick's Boys School ===
Trinity College Perth, Centenary Gates

CBC Perth was founded in 1894 by Bishop Matthew Gibney, Brother Ambrose Treacy, and the Congregation of Christian Brothers. It was located in the heart of Perth on the corner of Victoria Avenue and St Georges Terrace.

In 1938, the boarding school and some day school boys moved to the new school at Aquinas College, Salter Point. Aquinas inherited the school colours red and black, the school crest and motto, the honour boards, and the school Public Schools Association (PSA) membership and achievements as well as the Headmaster. The new campus at Aquinas depleted student numbers at CBC Perth, which no longer accommodated boarders. Nearby, St Patrick's, a Christian Brothers school in the city on the corner of Wellington and Lord Streets, was overflowing. Many students transferred from St Patrick's, and CBC Perth continued as a day school from 1938. Stripped of its history, traditions and students, CBC Perth raised new honour boards and the colours light blue, royal blue and green, and the College set about building a new heritage which 24 years later would become Trinity College.

When Perth won the right to host the 1962 British Empire and Commonwealth Games, the City of Perth negotiated with the Christian Brothers from 1958 to 1960 to purchase CBC Perth for £A 267,000, equivalent to A$8.9 million in 2022, in order to widen St Georges Terrace and to construct a new hotel. The Chevron-Hilton Hotel Group which had committed to the development, ran into difficulties, and the school buildings remained until demolition in the mid-1960s. The site was vacant until the Australian Taxation Office building was built there several years later. The building is now the Duxton Hotel. The council provided a 14-acre (5.7 ha) site for the new college on reclaimed land in East Perth on the banks of the Swan River, next to the WACA Ground, Gloucester Park, and The Causeway.

Brother J. A. Kelly, headmaster of CBC Perth, and architect Jim Henderson fast tracked construction of Trinity College from 1960 to ensure the college opened in time for the 1962 school year. Even with the pressing deadline, Kelly was instrumental in building the imaginative round chapel at Trinity, and he commissioned Ted Gowers to design the stained glass windows set in concrete. At the time, this was the largest work of art undertaken in the post-war years of Western Australia. Kelly also commissioned artist Margaret Priest to design and make abstract statues of the Sacred Heart of Jesus, the Blessed Virgin Mary, the Crucifix, and the fourteen Stations of the Cross.

By the end of 1961, Trinity College was nearing completion. CBC Perth closed and when St Patrick's closed two years later the two schools became one.

=== Trinity ===
In 1962, Trinity opened as a day school with 830 boys. The official opening was held on 25 March 1962. The school had a new crest and motto, and retained the colours and the honour boards of CBC Perth which were raised in 1938. Trinity dominated Association Catholic Colleges sporting events. In 1968, Trinity joined the PSA and the manful rivalry with Aquinas College, entered a level playing field. In 1972, Trinity won the PSA athletics carnival ending a seven-year winning streak by Aquinas. In the years ahead, coaches and students at Aquinas College responded with the call, "Beat Trinity!"

== Campus ==
The college has undergone significant expansion. The original 1962 buildings included Trinity Chapel, A and B blocks, Gibney Hall, the pavilion, a squash and handball court (both demolished late 1999), and the Brothers' Monastery (rebuilt into the Junior School in 1991). In 1983, Gibney Hall was widened, by bricking-in the balcony on the western side, and lengthened to accommodate all students and staff at assemblies. Over the years the college has expanded to include Kelly Senior School 1968, Duffy Library 1979, admin block 1981, Foley Physical Education Centre 1992, Treacy Design and Technology Centre 2001, Brockwell Observatory 2001, Curtis Aquatic Centre 2004, and O'Doherty Cultural Education Centre 2010. In addition to the East Perth campus, the school has Camp Kelly, an outdoor education facility situated 8 kilometres (5 mi) south of Dwellingup, and 10 hectares (25 acres) of sports ground at Waterford.

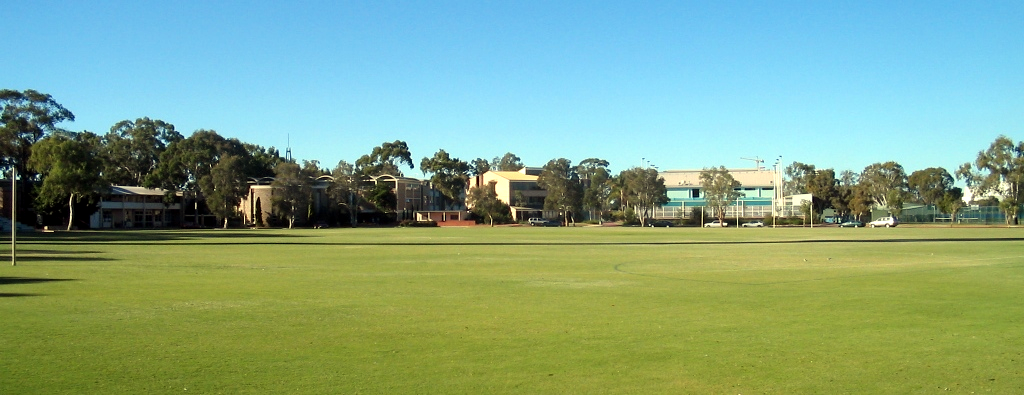
View from the oval

== Principals ==
Brother Kelly was the last headmaster of CBC Perth and the founding headmaster of Trinity College. He was headmaster during 1962-1966 and he returned again as headmaster during 1978–1984. Four Christian Brothers served as headmaster of the college. Over the years, lay teachers gradually replaced Christian Brothers on staff. In 1994, Anthony Curtis was appointed the first lay principal (name changed from headmaster to principal). Shortly after his retirement the school aquatic complex was named in his honour.

Principal	Term	Legacy
Br JA (Tony) Kelly	1962–1965	School founder. Oversaw school construction and the transfer of students from CBC Perth to Trinity College. Instrumental in circular architecture of Trinity Chapel and Gibney Hall. Commissioned abstract art-work to complement the design of the school. Trinity Irish Pipes and Drums Band formed Sunday, 11 June 1962. Land negotiated from Clontarf and Waterford Playing Fields established.
Br John Carrigg	1966–1971	Established rowing program with John Messer. Successfully negotiated PSA membership. Oversaw the building of Kelly Science Block. Directed the landscaping of Trinity and with the help of Tim Megaw developed Waterford Playing Fields. Confirmed for the record, Trinity was the continuation of CBC Perth and the custodian of St Patrick's heritage.
Br Basil Hickey	1972–1977	First old boy to become Trinity headmaster. Fr Keyte became school chaplain. Junior school singing group The Riversiders appeared regularly on Channel 7 Stars of the Future. 25m concrete swimming pool built 1972 via the fundraising efforts of Br Mann. 1972, Trinity wins the PSA Athletics Trophy for the first time. 1974, Br Hickey was the first headmaster to coach a winning Alcock Cup football team.
Br JA (Tony) Kelly	1978–1984	Second term as headmaster. Completed Duffy Library. Built admin block. Music program enriched through the partnership of Br Basile, Br Crooks and Robert Braham. Ian McRae appointed first lay principal of the junior school. Warren Anderson and Denis Horgan provided financial assistance for 8.5ha land purchase near Dwellingup to develop Camp Kelly.
Br Warwick Bryant	1985–1993	Last brother as headmaster. Due to decreased numbers, brothers move from Brothers' House to Joel Terrace, East Perth. Brothers' House converted into the new junior school. Board of Management set-up to oversee college affairs. Introduction of computer records in 1988. Peer Minister Program and Campus Ministry Program introduced 1991. Golden period of PSA sporting success.
Tony Curtis	1994–2003	First lay principal (name changed from headmaster to principal). School refurbished with airconditioning throughout. Signum Fidei window from CBC Perth recovered and presented to school by TOBA president Patrick Coward 1994. Centenary Park opened 1996. Replica of CBC Perth boundary fence installed. Brockwell Observatory and Treacy Centre completed 2001.
Peter Bothe	2004–2005	Edmund Rice Charter launched distilling the eleven defining characteristics of the 38 Edmund Rice Schools in Australia. 2004, the College Board developed a strategic path for the future of Trinity. Years 8 & 9 Middle School established. Curtis Aquatic Centre built. Student & staff services enhanced. 2004, equal best PSA sporting year by Trinity.
Rob Henderson	2005–2006	Hosted over 500 Edmund Rice ministries from all over Western Australia. Refurbished chapel 2006. Music, dance and drama ensembles awarded the Catholic Schools Zenith Award for the third year running. Trinity won the athletics, and Trinity football 1st XVIII won Alcock Cup for the fourth year in succession.
Ivan Banks	2007–2018	Three campus upgrades at Trinity, Waterford Playing Fields, and at Camp Kelly Dwellingup. Doherty Cultural Centre completed 2010. Trinity campus 50th anniversary celebrated 2012. Torch of Learning crafted and used for ceremonial occasions. Land exchanged with EPRA. Trinity swapped land along the WACA boundary for land to the northeast of the college. The new Sports Centre was opened in 2017 one of the largest building projects of the school's history.
Darren O'Neil	2019–	

== Academic ranking, Western Australia ==
WA school ATAR ranking

Year	Rank	Median ATAR	Eligible students	Students with ATAR	% students with ATAR
2021	29	84.9	TBC	TBC	TBC
2020	43	82.85	136	90	66.18
2019	27	84.2	172	125	74.67
2018	22	86.5	187	141	75.4
2017	22	86.65	182	131	71.98
2016	21	85.70	194	157	80.93

Year 12 student achievement data

Year	Rank (Note: Ranking of school compared to other schools in the state)	% +75 in WACE (Note: Based on the number of Stage 3 course enrolments in the school where a WACE course score of 75 or above was achieved)	Rank	% +65 in WACE (Note: Based on the number of Stage 3 course enrolments in the school where a WACE course score of 65 or above was achieved)	% graduates (Note: Percentage of Year 12 cohort that graduated with a WACE certificate)
2015	34	12.28	37	34.84	99.12
2014	23	14.86	27	40.21	100
2013	31	12.32	22	38.52	97.56
2012	>50	<9.88	35	38.65	100
2011	18	19.98	24	53.47	99.47
2010	18	18.40	16	59.59	99.42
2009	25	38.73 (>75% minimum of one subject)	27	42.26 (64.6% or more)	97.88

Beazley Medal

2011: Calum Braham won the Beazley Medal for the top ranked WACE student.

John Curtin Scholarship

2013: Roberto Di Giovanni received a John Curtin Scholarship from Curtin University. The Scholarship is the most generous and prestigious undergraduate scholarship offered by the university.

2016: Jed Herne received a John Curtin Scholarship from Curtin University. The scholarship is the most generous and prestigious undergraduate scholarship offered by the university.

UWA Fogarty Scholarship

2016: James Heald was awarded the UWA Fogarty Scholarship which is based on academic excellence and outstanding achievements in at least three of four categories: leadership, community involvement, the arts and sport.

== Sport ==
Trinity joined the PSA in 1968 and since 1969 Trinity has competed in all PSA sports. It is compulsory for each student to compete in a summer and a winter sport. In football, Trinity students typically do not compete for selection for the Western Australian Football League colts or for Teal Cup teams. This does not hamper future selection opportunities for students. Many students have been selected in the Australian Football League national draft based on their performance in the PSA. The sporting skills, coaching, fitness and organisation of students from the seven PSA schools is commensurable to the highest levels offered by any schoolboy competition in Western Australia. This is evident by the number of former PSA students who compete in their chosen sports at state, national, international, and Olympic levels.

As the most recent school in the PSA, Trinity has improved over time and the college has moved up the ranks in most sports. The most notable exception is swimming.

The main campus at East Perth has one oval which prior to the EPRA land-swap catered for a turf cricket ground in summer, a football oval in winter, and an athletics training track in spring. There are four outdoor hardcourts marked for tennis and basketball. The campus has a 50 m swimming pool and a gymnasium which is marked with basketball, volleyball, and badminton courts. As well, the school has a rowing boathouse on the East Perth foreshore. Courses along Heirisson Island, the Swan River foreshore, and Kings Park including Jacobs Ladder provide excellent cross-country tracks. The East Perth campus lacks dedicated facilities for hockey, rugby and soccer. At various times the college has sought to purchase the land between the college and the Causeway, as well as vacant land on the north side of Gloucester Park. Negotiations for these purchases with the City of Perth have repeatedly fallen through due to town planning intentions. However, the City of Perth has allowed the college to use facilities at Haig Park, which has now been redeveloped by EPRA, and to use facilities at Langley Park and Wellington Square.

The Waterford playing fields have five cricket ovals, three turfed and two synthetic pitches. Two turfed pitch ovals become football ovals in winter and the remaining pitches separate into two soccer fields, two hockey fields and one rugby field.

The senior school holds official college trials and championships for swimming and athletics. Students who advance from the trials compete against each other in the college championships to decide school champions and to decide who qualifies for events on the school teams. Summer and winter team sports hold similar selection procedures relevant to the criteria set-down by each code. College champions for summer and winter team sports are chosen by judging committees who award points for a player's performance for each official PSA fixture. In addition, the college has three major sports awards. The J P Ilich Award for outstanding service to the school in sport, and the Old Boys Awards for the students who score the most points for Trinity at PSA athletics and swimming carnivals.

=== PSA premierships ===
Trinity has won the following PSA premierships.

- Athletics (10) – 1972, 1985, 1988, 1989, 1990, 1991, 2004, 2005, 2006, 2010
- Basketball (8) – 1987, 1992, 2007, 2009, 2010, 2011, 2014, 2016
- Cricket (7) – 1975, 1980, 1985, 2005, 2007, 2010, 2020 (Shared with Hale School due to COVID-19)
- Cross Country (10) – 1990, 1991, 2002, 2003, 2004, 2007, 2008, 2009, 2010, 2016
- Football (10) – 1974, 1976, 1983, 1997, 1998, 2003, 2004, 2005, 2006, 2007
- Golf (2) – 2019, 2020
- Hockey (7) – 1982, 1987, 1988, 1989, 1991, 1992, 1993
- Rowing (16) – 2002, 2003, 2004, 2007, 2008, 2010, 2011, 2012, 2015, 2016, 2017, 2019, 2021, 2022, 2023, 2024.
- Rugby (9) – 1991, 1992, 1993, 1994, 1995, 1996, 1997, 1998, 2002
- Soccer (14) – 1987, 1988, 1989, 1990, 1991, 1992, 1993, 1995, 2000, 2001, 2007, 2008, 2012, 2015
- Swimming – 2007
- Tennis (4) – 1974, 1984, 1988, 1989
- Volleyball (6) – 2009, 2010, 2013, 2014, 2015, 2016
- Water Polo – 2013

== School hymn ==
The title of the school hymn, In nomine Domini, is derived from the school motto and Psalm 123: adjutorium nostrum in Nomine Domini (transl. Our help is in the name of the Lord). The hymn was written in 1979 by Father Paul Keyte, the school chaplain at the time. Inspired by the Harrow School Song Forty Years On, Keyte wrote in the 1979 School Annual, he was not merely trying to write a hymn but an anthem and something that, "would not only renew loyalty to the school but would also rekindle the flame of faith". The music was written by Brother Gerald Crooks, a long serving music teacher at the college. In 1984, Crooks introduced a brass fanfare lead featuring trumpets and trombones. In Nomine Domine is sung at Speech Nights, Year 12 Graduations, Anzac Day ceremonies, and at PSA sporting events.

== International achievements ==
International Mathematical Modeling Challenge 2016

The team from Trinity won the Meritous Award – the second highest award category – at the International Mathematical Modeling Challenge (IM^{2}C). The team was judged by the IM^{2}C international panel against solutions from a pool of 40 teams from 23 countries.

World Schools Cross-Country Championships 2008

In 2007, the Trinity cross-country team competed at the Telstra National All-Schools Cross Country Championships held in Perth, Western Australia. Trinity won the overall schools championships and the team was chosen to represent Australia. In 2008, the team finished 6th at the World Schools Cross-Country Championships held in the Czech Republic. The equal highest position by an Australian school.

F1 in Schools World Championships 2007

Trinity students were awarded Best Engineered Car at the F1 in Schools World Championships held in Melbourne.

== Sexual abuse ==
In November 2020, two former teachers were convicted of failing to report suspected child sexual abuse. The incident occurred on a Trinity rugby trip to Japan in 2017. The teachers, Ian Francis Hailes and Anthony Paul Webb, were said to be the first people convicted under Western Australia's mandatory reporting of sexual abuse laws.

The alleged victim told a court he was bullied throughout the trip including being forced face-down onto a bed by Trinity teammates, his pants pulled down and sexually assaulted with a carrot. The alleged victim said the incident was raised at a "fines session".

The court found the teachers formed a reasonable belief on the rugby tour that sexual abuse might have occurred, but did not report it, as required by law.

== Notable alumni ==
An alumnus of Trinity College is called a Trinity Old Boy. Notable Old Boys include:

- Jeremy Allanson – Justice of the Supreme Court of Western Australia
- Warren Anderson – businessman
- Michael Brennan – AFL football player, West Coast Eagles
- Beau Casson – Test cricketer
- Vince Catania – MLA for North West Central, MLC for Mining and Pastoral
- Ben Cureton – world champion rower
- Mitch Duncan – Australian Football League player, Geelong Football Club
- Michael Edgley – entertainment entrepreneur
- Chris Ellison – Cabinet minister
- Andrew Embley – AFL football player, West Coast Eagles
- Dave Faulkner – musician, Hoodoo Gurus
- William Foley – Archbishop of Perth
- Tim Hammond SC – MHR for Perth
- Denis Horgan – vigneron Leeuwin Estate, co-founder Notre Dame University WA
- Simon Katich – Test cricketer
- Shaun Murphy – international football player, Socceroos
- Ray O'Connor – Premier of Western Australia
- Seamus Rafferty SC – Justice of the District Court of Western Australia
- Alex Rullo – racing car driver
- Shiny Joe Ryan – musician, Pond
- Craig Serjeant – Test cricketer
- John Steffensen – Olympic athlete
- Henk Vogels Jr – Olympic & Tour de France cyclist
- Brandon Starcevich – AFL football player, Brisbane Lions
- Nic Martin – AFL footballer
- Jed Busslinger – AFL footballer
- Travis Colyer – AFL footballer
- Kane Lucas – AFL footballer
- Josh Hill – AFL footballer
- Alex Fasolo – AFL footballer
- Reece Conca – AFL footballer

== Gallery ==
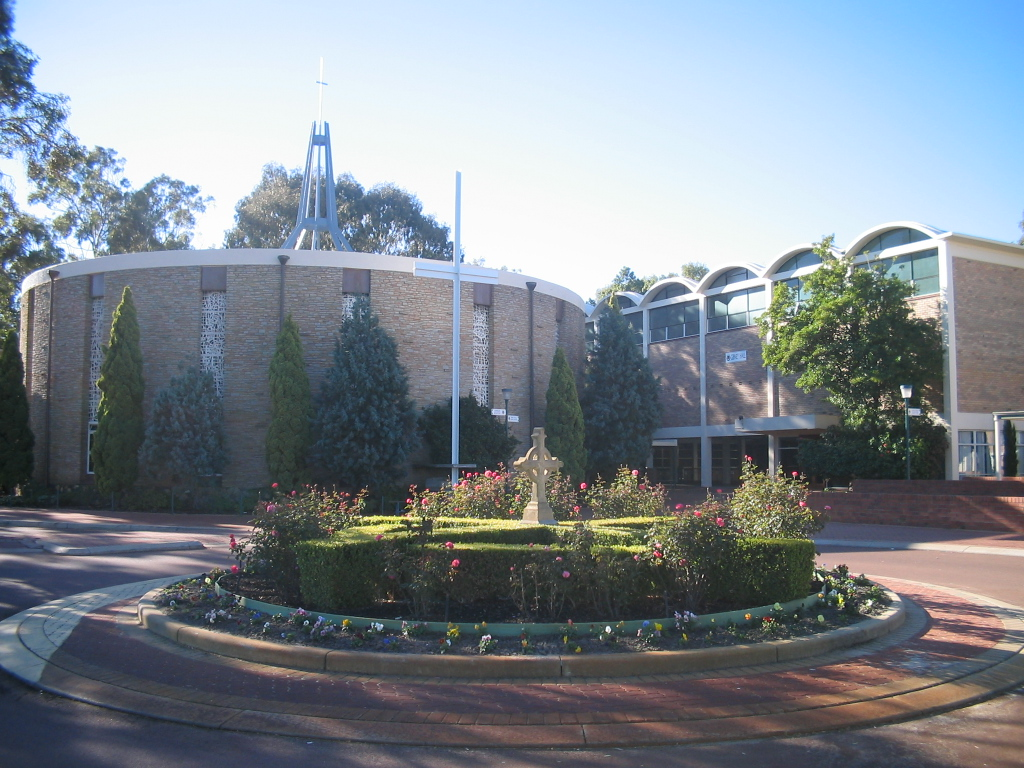
Chapel and Gibney Hall

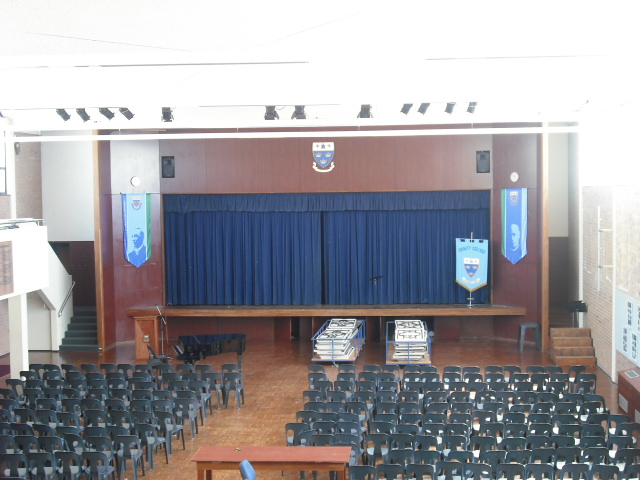
Inside Gibney Hall

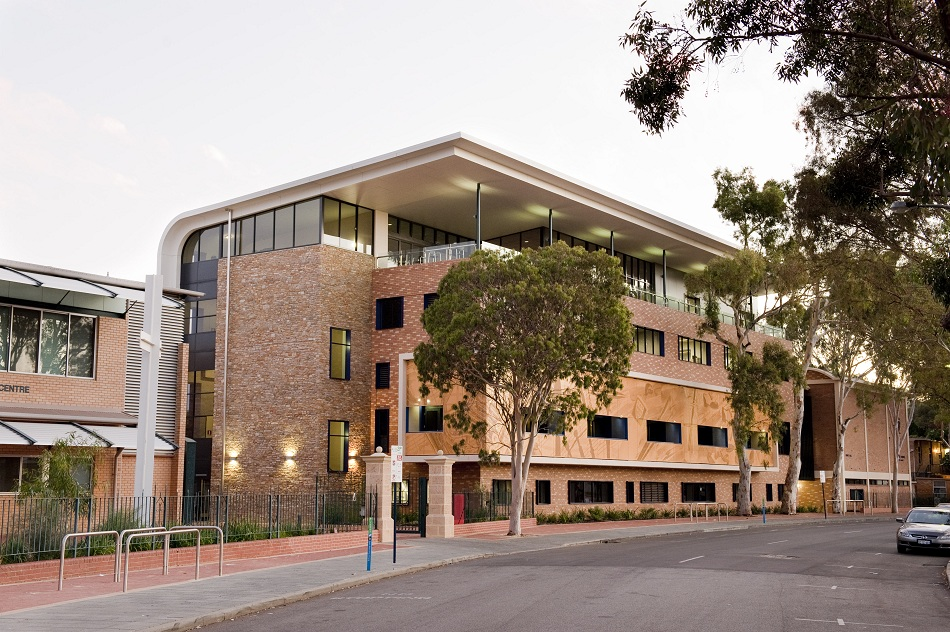
Cultural Centre

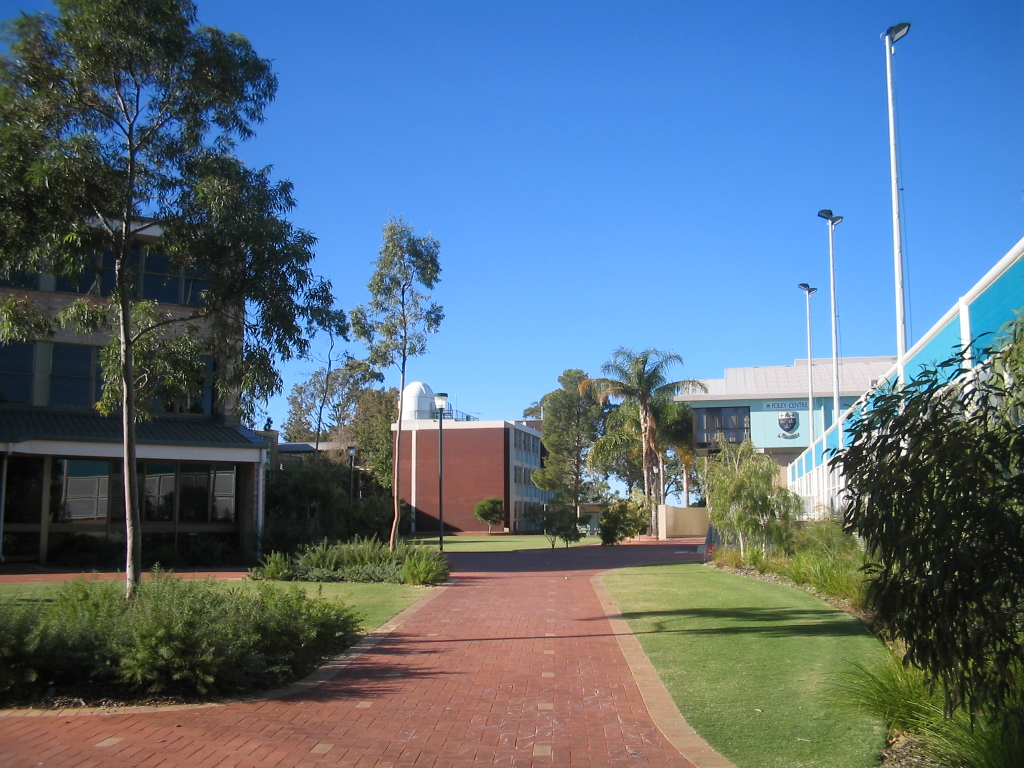
Towards the telescope observatory

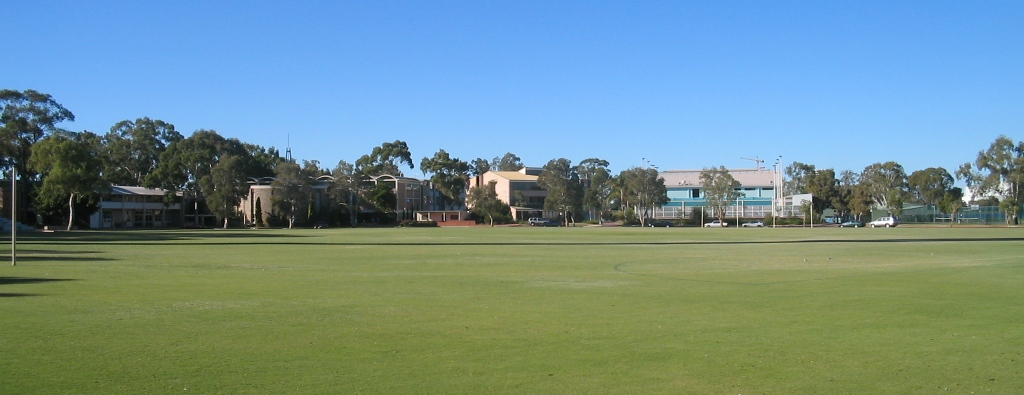
View across the main oval

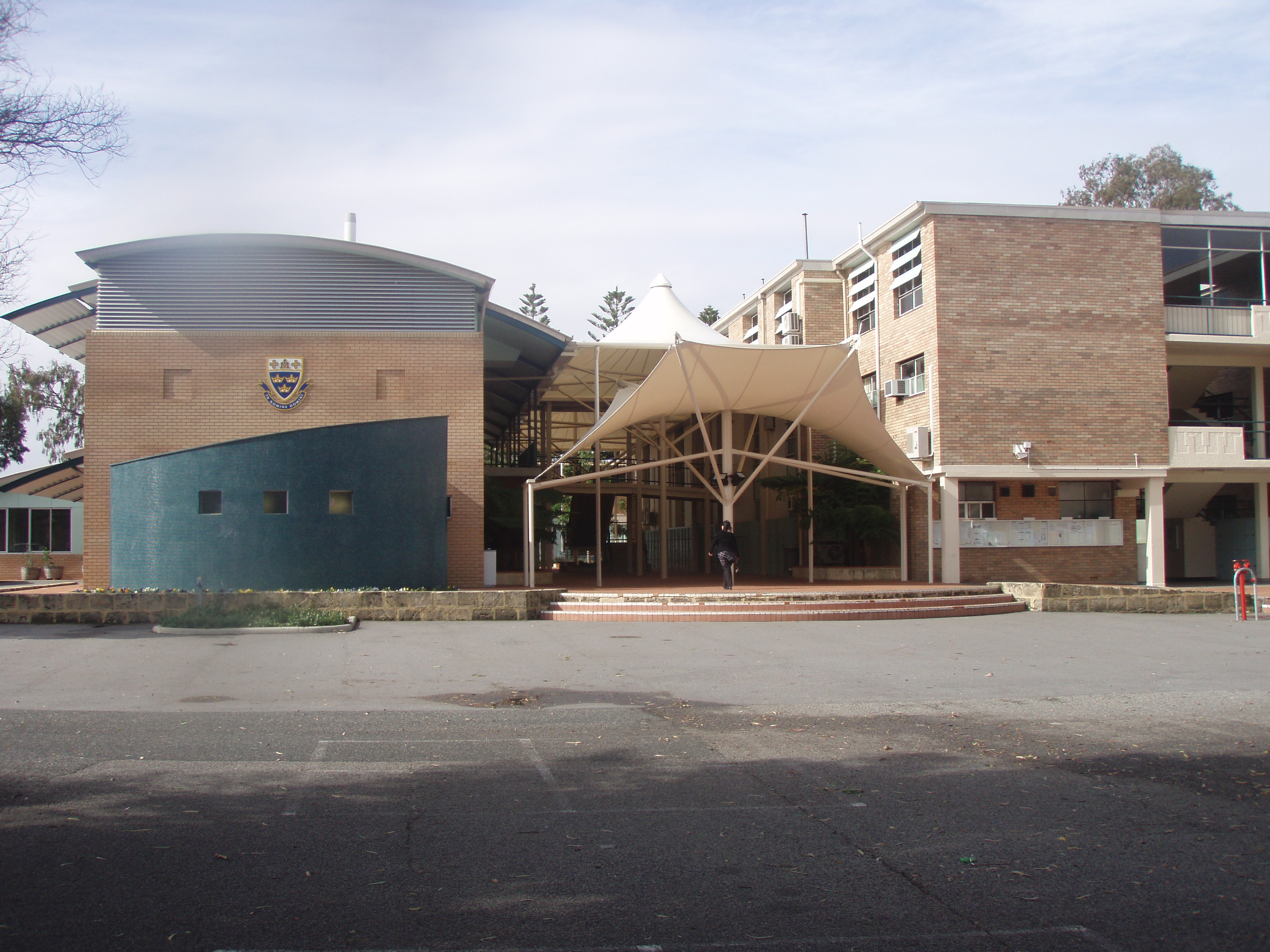
Treacy Centre (left), 'A' Block (right) and quadrangle (foreground)

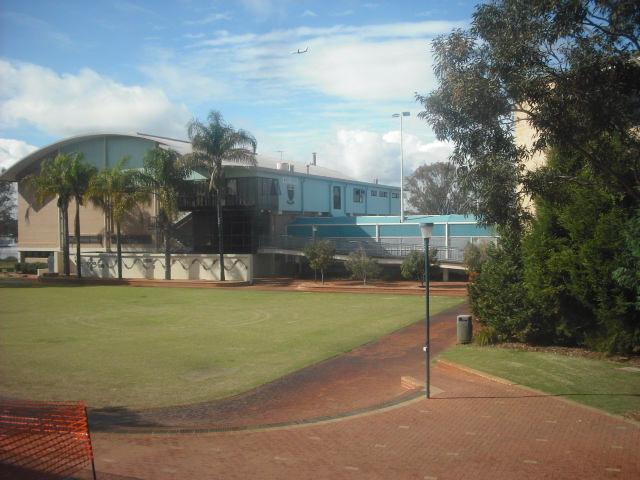
Gym (left) and AC Curtis Aquatic Centre (right), Centenary Park (foreground)

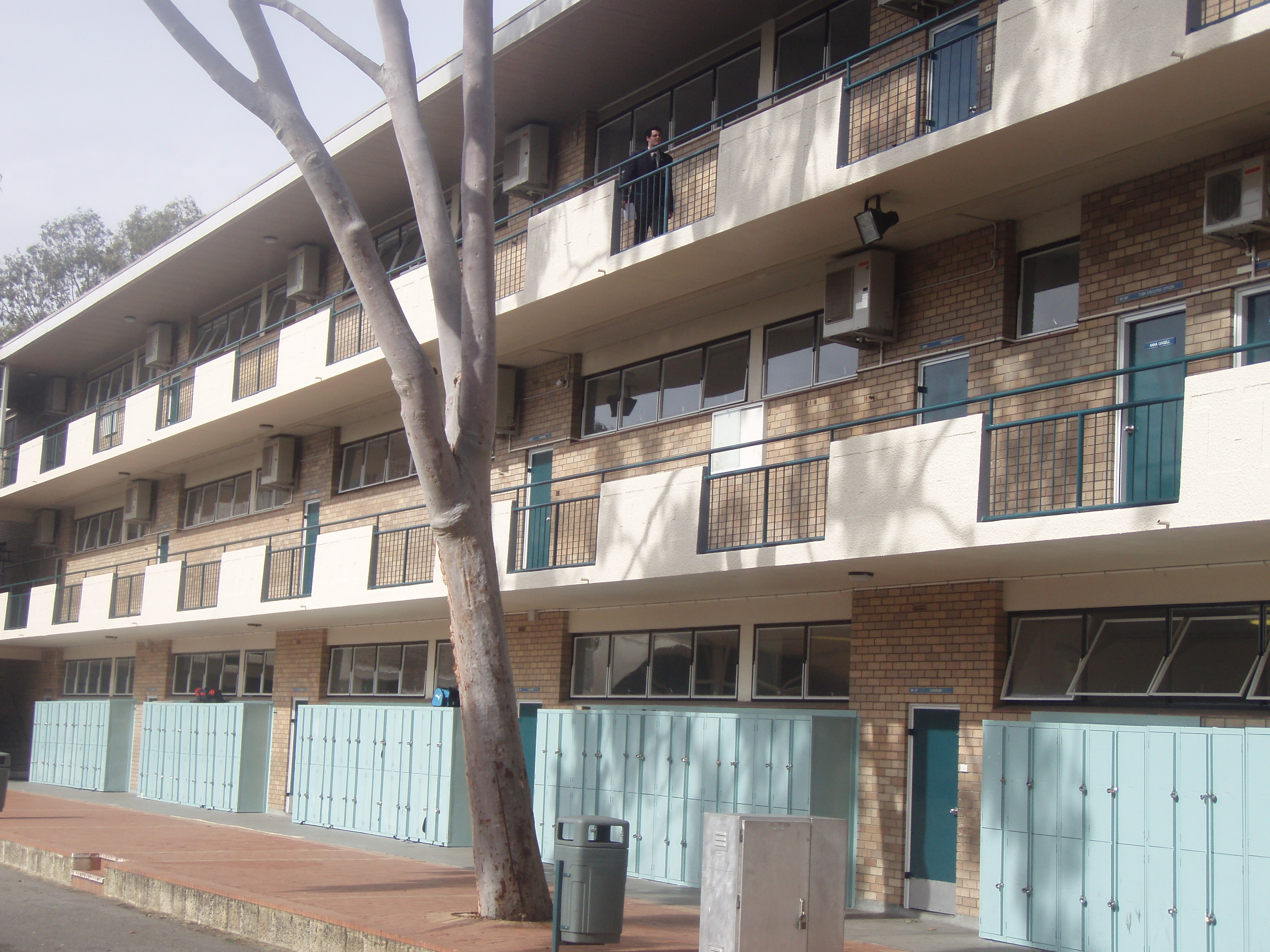
'B' Block

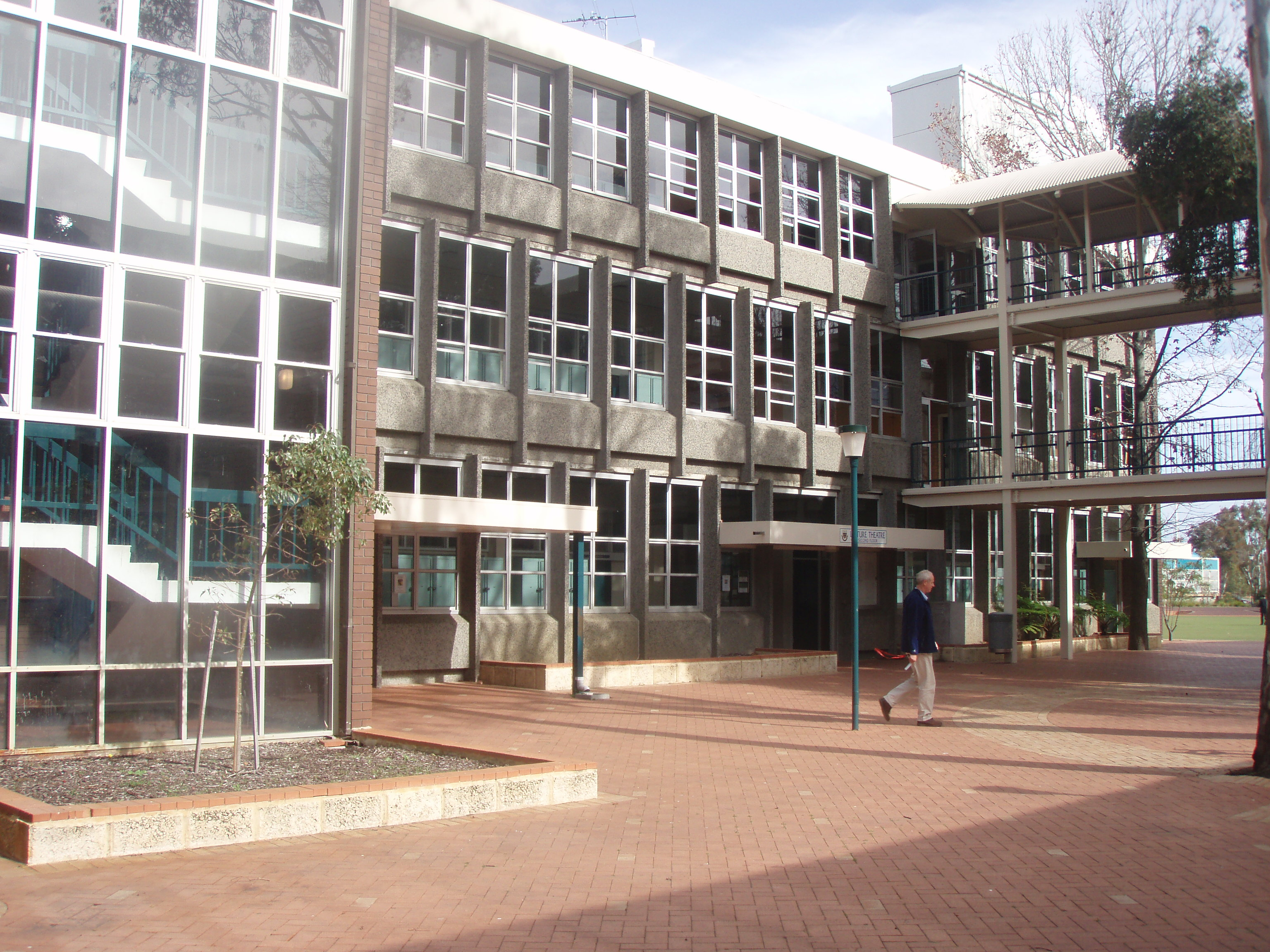
Kelly Senior Building/'S' Block

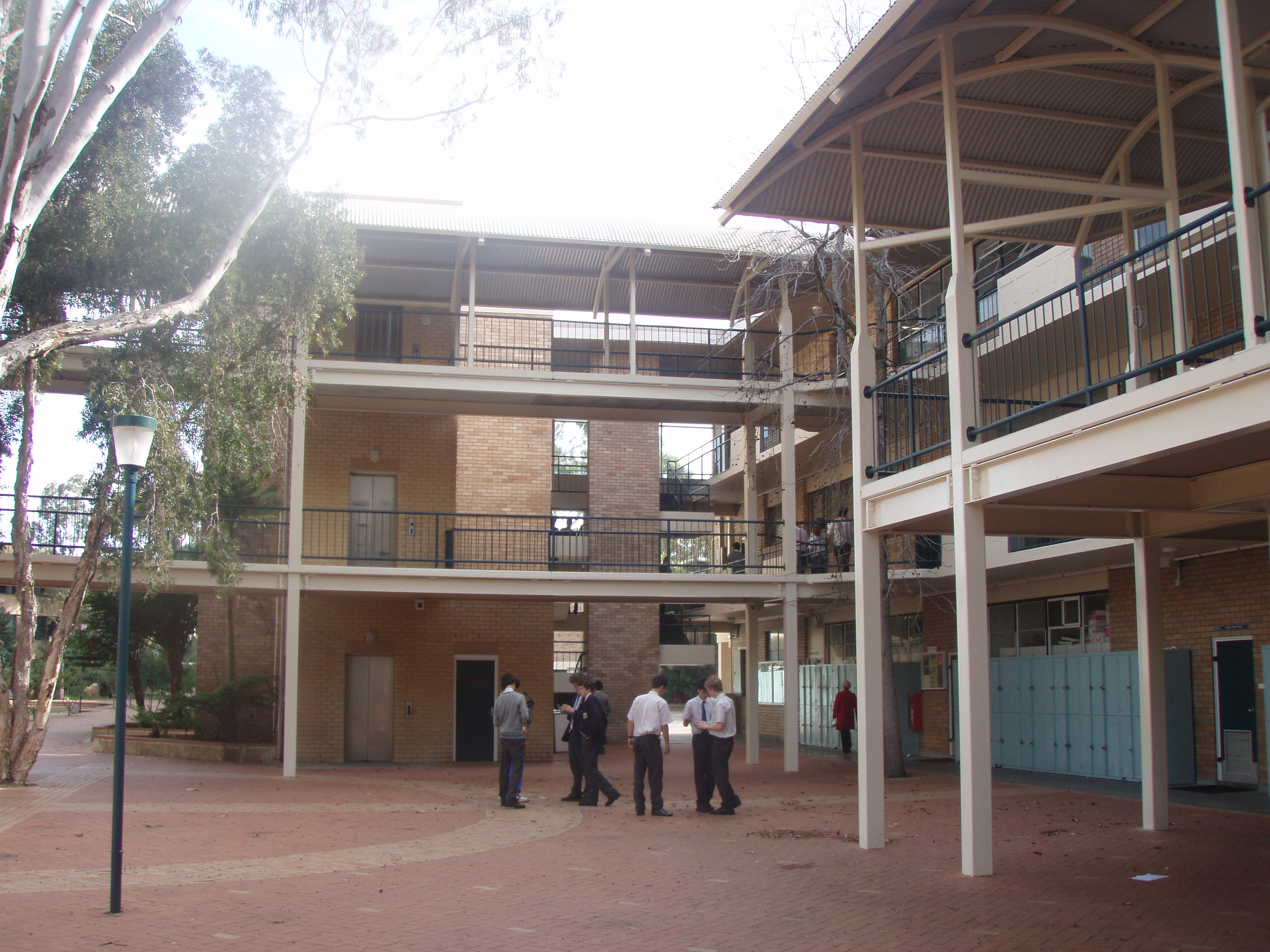
Lift (centre) and 'A' block (right)

== See also ==
- Catholic education in Australia
- List of schools in Perth, Western Australia
