= Aquinas College Chapel =

Heritage listed church building in Perth

- Chapel of Saint Thomas Aquinas
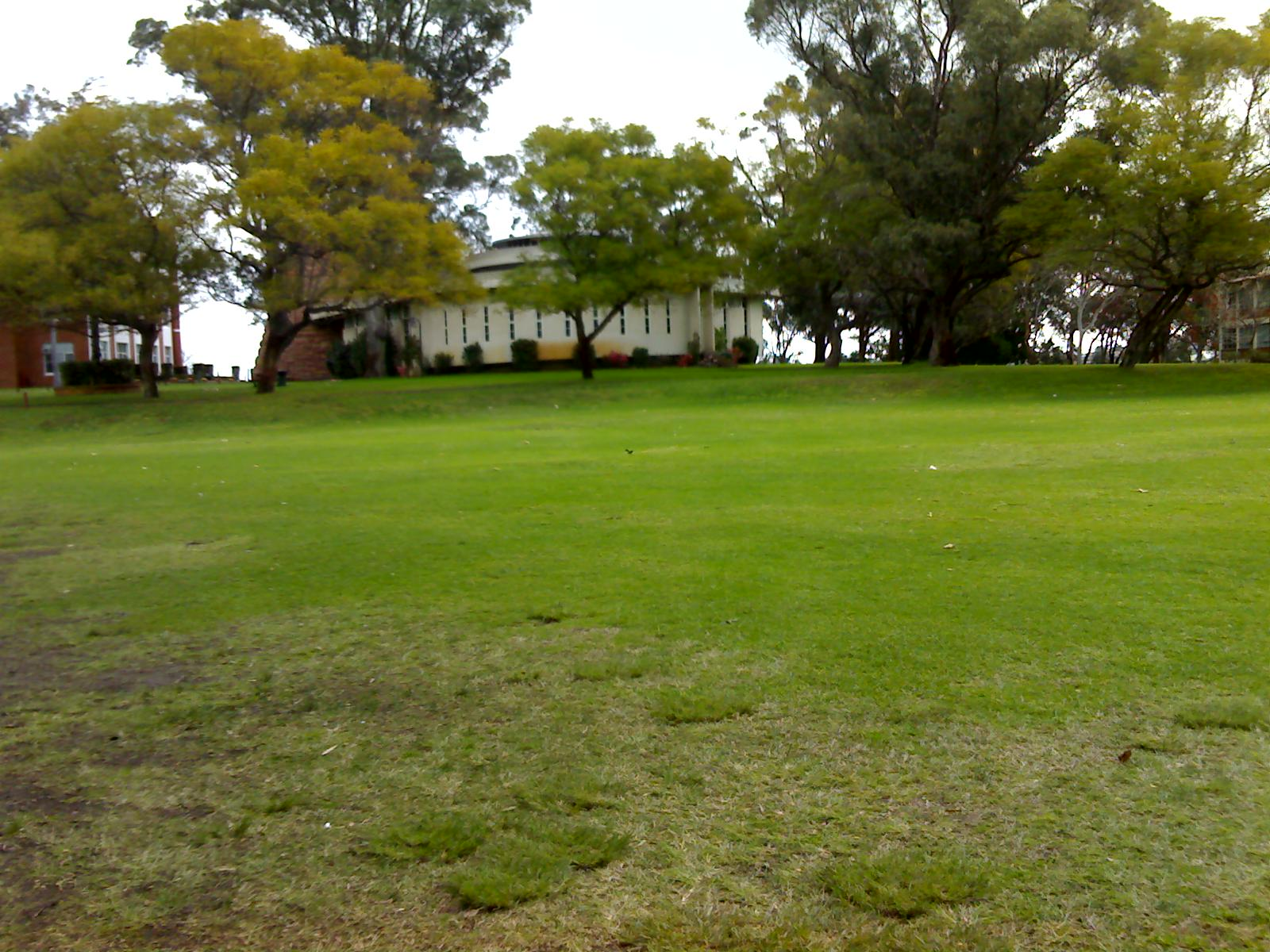
- Chapel of St. Thomas Aquinas in 2007
- Aquinas College Chapel
- 32°01′30″S 115°51′49″E
- Address: Aquinas College, Perth, Western Australia
- Country: Australia
- Denomination: Catholic Church

History
- Status: Chapel
- Founder: Christian Brothers
- Dedication: Saint Thomas Aquinas

Architecture
- Functional status: Active
- Architect(s): Henderson and Thompson
- Architectural type: Late 20th-century Organic
- Completed: 1966
- Construction cost: A£83,370

Specifications
- Materials: Mount Barker stone

Western Australia Heritage Register
- Official name: Administration Building and Chapel, Aquinas College
- Designated: 17 December 2010
- Reference no.: 2396

The Aquinas College Chapel, formally known as the Chapel of St Thomas Aquinas, is a heritage-listed building located on the Aquinas College property in Salter Point, in the city of Perth, Western Australia. The building is owned by the Christian Brothers as part of the Aquinas College property.

== History ==
The chapel was officially opened on 12 August 1966.

The single-storey stone and concrete chapel was listed of the permanent register of heritage places by the Heritage Council of Western Australia on 17 December 2010.

The Chapel was one of the first Catholic buildings constructed in Western Australia in response to the impact of liturgical changes arising from the Second Vatican Council, with the Chapel's form and plan implementing the Council’s theological emphases on inclusiveness in worship. Completed in the Late Twentieth Century Organic architectural style, the Chapel features innovative use of traditional materials and a curved form and design to complement its natural setting. Materials included the rare use of red Mount Barker stone, which had a limited distribution and is no longer quarried.
