= Christ Church Grammar School =

Independent boys' school in Perth, Western Australia

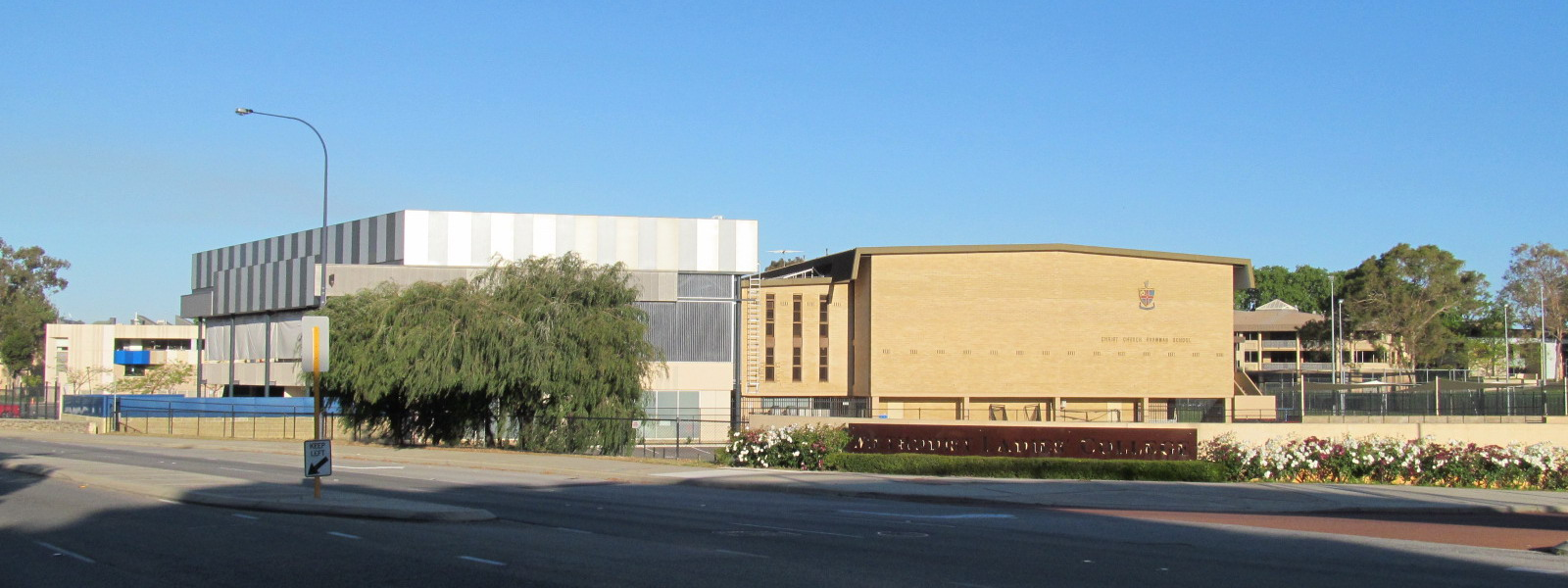
- Christ Church Grammar School as seen from Stirling Highway, in 2012

Location
- Claremont, Western Australia, Perth. Australia; 31°59′12″S 115°46′38″E

Information
- Former name: Christ Church Preparatory School; Christ Church School
- Type: Independent single-sex early learning, primary, and secondary day and boarding school
- Motto: Latin: Deus Dux Doctrina Lux (God is our leader, learning is our light)
- Denomination: Anglicanism
- Established: 1910; 116 years ago
- Founder: William Joseph McClemans
- Sister school: St Hilda's Anglican School for Girls
- Educational authority: WA Department of Education
- Principal: Alan Jones
- Chaplain: Nicholas Russell
- Employees: 250
- Years: Early learning and K–12
- Gender: Boys
- Enrolment: 1,650
- Campuses: Claremont: primary and secondary; Mount Claremont: playing fields; St John's Wood: playing fields; Kooringal: outdoor education
- Campus type: Suburban
- Colours: Blue and gold
- Affiliations: Public Schools' Association; Independent Primary School Heads of Australia; Association of Independent Schools in Western Australia; Association of Headmasters of Independent Schools Australia; Australian Boarding Schools' Association
- Website: www.ccgs.wa.edu.au

Christ Church Grammar School is a multi-campus independent Anglican single-sex early learning, primary and secondary day and boarding school for boys. Located in Perth, Western Australia, the school's main campus overlooks Freshwater Bay on the Swan River, in the suburb of Claremont.

The school is a member of the Public Schools' Association (PSA), Independent Primary School Heads of Australia (IPSHA), Association of Independent Schools in Western Australia (AISWA), Association of Headmasters of Independent Schools Australia (AHISA) and Australian Boarding Schools' Association (ABSA).

Christ Church Grammar School was founded in 1910 by W. J. McClemans. The school opened on 7 February 1910 as Christ Church Preparatory School with a single classroom and nine boys. (Note: Some sources say 16 boys.) In 1917, the school's status was raised from a preparatory school to university junior examination level and renamed Christ Church School. In 1931, it became known as Christ Church Grammar School.

A total of 1,650 boys, 110 of whom are boarders, are enrolled at Christ Church. More than 1,100 boys study in the senior school (Years 7 to 12) and over 500 attend the preparatory school (pre-kindergarten to Year 6).

As a non-selective school, Christ Church caters for a wide range of boys from those who are academically gifted through to students with learning challenges. It also offers places to overseas students.

== History ==
Christ Church Grammar School opened on 7 February 1910 as the Christ Church Preparatory School. The founder, Canon William Joseph McClemans, was the rector of Christ Church Claremont. The School opened with a single classroom and an enrolment of nine day boys.^{[note a]}

In 1917, the school's status was raised from preparatory school to university junior examination level and it was renamed Christ Church School. During this year, the Old Boys' Association was established and legislation by Synod brought Christ Church and Guildford Grammar School under the control of one representative council. Christ Church did not have any representation on the council until 1920, and during this time, financial difficulties put the existence of the school into jeopardy and under threat of closure by the council.

From the 1920s through to the 1940s, the school continued to grow. However, financial hardship and uncertainty continued and led to the resignation of several headmasters. When Christ Church gained its own school council in 1950, it was considered a turning point in the history of the school.

In 1951, Peter Moyes became headmaster and throughout the post-war period, Christ Church boomed. Enrolments increased from 259 in 1951, to 853 in 1966. During this period, a large number of buildings and facilities were built and two houses were purchased. A block of land next to the Claremont campus, was acquired as well as 8 hectares (20 acres) in Mt Claremont for use as playing fields.

In 1956, the school was invited to join the Public Schools' Association (PSA); in 1957, the school was awarded its first General Exhibition; in 1958, the school won the Head of the River race for the first time; and in 1967, Peter Edwards became the school's first old boy to be awarded a Rhodes Scholarship.

Moyes retired in 1981 after serving for 31 years as headmaster and was succeeded by A. J. de V. Hill in 1982. The next five years included significant developments in the school curriculum and system of pastoral care. The outdoor education centre at Kooringal, near Dwellingup, was extensively redeveloped and its courses became an essential part of each student's education.

Financial support from parents and old boys enabled the school to spend over $2 million on new facilities in less than three years. A major appeal in 1984 yielded $800,000.

Hill was headmaster for six years, followed by J. J. S. Madin in January 1988. Madin managed the next major projects in the school's development. These included a new science block and the redevelopment of the Senior School – a $4 million project that commenced in June 1987.

Madin resigned at the end of 2000 and in 2001, Garth Wynne took over as headmaster. In his first year, the council introduced the school mission – "Boys educated to know, to do, to live with others and to be" (UNESCO 1996).

At the end of 2015, Alan Jones was appointed to the position of principal of Christ Church.

== Headmasters and principals ==
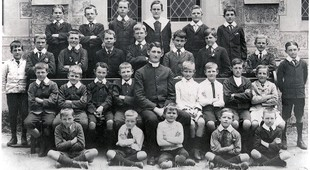
Canon William Joseph McClemans with pupils, in 1914

The following individuals have served as Headmaster of Christ Church Grammar School, or any precedent titles:

Ordinal	Officeholder	Title	Term start	Term end	Time in office	Notes
1	William Joseph McClemans	Headmaster	1910	1915	4–5 years	
2	S. C. Noake	Headmaster	1916	1921	4–5 years	
3	H. S. Thompson	Headmaster	1922	1922	0 years	
4	L. W. Parry	Headmaster	1923	1932	8–9 years	
5	B. T. Walters	Headmaster	1933	1942	8–9 years	
6	L. R. D. B. Jupp	Headmaster	1943	1947	3–4 years	
7	A. Todd	Headmaster	1948	1949	0–1 years	
8	J. F. A. Dobson	Acting Headmaster	1950	1950	0 years	
9	Peter Moyes	Headmaster	1951	1981	29–30 years	
10	A. J. de V. Hill	Headmaster	1982	1987	4–5 years	
11	J. J. S. Madin	Headmaster	1988	2000	11–12 years	
12	Garth Wynne	Headmaster	2000	2015	14–15 years	
13	Alan Jones	Principal	2016	incumbent	9–10 years	

== Campuses ==
Christ Church Grammar School has four campuses.

=== Claremont campus ===
The main campus, known as the Claremont campus, is located on the corner of Stirling Highway and Queenslea Drive in Claremont approximately nine kilometres (six miles) from the Perth central business district. The Claremont campus is home to both the senior and preparatory schools. Its Swan River frontage provides for the school's water sports program, which includes rowing and sailing. Other facilities include the chapel, a visual arts, design and technology centre, a state-of-the-art information and technology centre, gymnasium precinct and a heated 50m swimming pool. The Claremont campus also houses the school's residential community which accommodates 110 boys from regional Western Australia, interstate and overseas.

=== Mount Claremont playing fields ===
The Mount Claremont sporting campus, located three kilometres (two miles) north of the Claremont campus, provides eight hectares (twenty acres) of playing fields for cricket, hockey, football, Cross Country and rugby.

=== St John's Wood playing fields ===
Opened in May 2017 St John's Wood, located close to the existing playing fields at Mount Claremont, provides a further eight hectares (twenty acres) of playing fields.

=== Kooringal ===
The school's outdoor education program is centred at Kooringal, located on the Darling Scarp, 110 kilometres (68 mi) south east of Perth and 15 kilometres (9.3 mi) from the mill town of Dwellingup. Kooringal, meaning "home by the water" in the Aboriginal dialect of the district, was established in 1972 as a staffed and self-contained outdoor education centre for Christ Church students in Years 5 to 11. Kooringal is an integral part of the school's education.

== Community ==
=== Centre for Ethics ===
The Centre for Ethics resulted from the 1993 Strategic Plan. Officially opened in 1996 by Fiona Stanley, the centre offers a program of seminars, lectures, discussion groups and a newsletter. The centre brings people, who are seen as leaders in ethical issues, to the school. The aim of the program is to enable students to engage in the community's conversation on ethics and spirituality. The director and founder of the Centre for Ethics is Canon Frank Sheehan.

=== Service in Action program ===
The Service in Action program replaced the Pilgrimage of Hope in 2013. The programis based on Christian values provides an opportunity to learn through service to others, particularly those in circumstances of disadvantage. Throughout the year students raise funds for the program and participate in humanitarian pilgrimages to remote Indigenous Australian communities and to schools and orphanages overseas.

=== Midnite Youth Theatre Company ===
The Midnite Youth Theatre Company is named after their first production, a work adapted from Randolf Stow's bushranger novel Midnite. The company was formed in 1987 with 40 actors and 16 musicians from Christ Church Grammar School and Methodist Ladies' College. In 1988, the company toured the United Kingdom, representing Australian youth for the bicentenary. Founded by Tony Howes, director of drama at Christ Church from 1986 to 2011, the Midnite Youth Theatre Company seeks to stretch its members with music theatre, opera, plays, experimental works, street theatre, group-devised pieces and commissions.

=== Sport ===
==== PSA premierships ====
Since joining the Public Schools Association (PSA) in 1957, Christ Church has been named the "champion school" on the following occasions:

- Badminton (5) – 2002, 2003, 2022, 2023, 2024
- Basketball (3) – 1998, 1999, 2013
- Cricket (5) – 1977, 1990, 2017, 2022, 2023
- Cross Country (18) – 1982, 1983, 1984, 1985, 1986, 1987, 1988, 1989, 1992, 1993, 1994, 1995, 1997, 2017, 2018, 2022, 2023, 2024
- Football (3) – 1971, 1974, 1977, 2023 (James B Williams Memorial Cup)
- Golf (3) – 1999, 2002, 2008
- Hockey (13) – 1966, 1967, 1973, 1986, 2002, 2004, 2007, 2010, 2017, 2018, 2019, 2022, 2024
- Rowing (21) – 1958, 1959, 1961, 1963, 1964, 1967, 1979, 1981, 1986, 1992, 2002, 2003, 2005, 2006, 2008, 2011, 2012, 2014, 2019, 2022, 2025 (Challenge Cup), 2019, 2021, 2023 (Christopher Wallwork Memorial Cup)
- Rugby (5) – 1961, 1962, 1966, 2001, 2019
- Soccer (5) – 2011, 2014, 2015, 2016, 2024
- Surfing (9) – 2005, 2007, 2010, 2011, 2012, 2014, 2020, 2021, 2022
- Swimming (17) – 1987, 1988, 1989, 1990, 1995, 2008, 2009, 2010, 2011, 2012, 2017, 2018, 2019, 2020, 2021, 2022, 2025
- Tennis (13) – 1987, 1995, 1996, 2001, 2003, 2008, 2013, 2015, 2016, 2017, 2018, 2019, 2020
- Water Polo (8) – 2009, 2010, 2012, 2018, 2019, 2022, 2023, 2025

=== Peter Moyes Centre ===
The Peter Moyes Centre (PMC – formerly the Christopher Wallwork Support Hub) was the initiative of former headmaster Peter Moyes, who from the beginning of his term as headmaster, believed that the school should provide for students of all abilities. In 1969, the school established a remedial centre for students with specific difficulties with literacy and numeracy. The centre now caters for students in the preparatory and senior schools who have a range of physical or intellectual disabilities. Each student has an individual program based on his educational needs and, where possible, students are integrated into mainstream classes. The focus of the program is the development of independence that will prepare the students for life after school.

=== Outdoor education program ===
==== Venture ====
Venture is a 10-day hike for Year 10 students, which places 14 groups on walk routes through the bushland and coastal setting of Walpole Nornalup National Park. A teacher and an outdoor education specialist accompany each group.

Venture was developed during 1989 and 1990 with the first camp in 1991. The aim of Venture is to give Year 10 students greater focus by presenting them with real challenges where they can practice goal setting and objectives, and develop problem-solving skills in a group situation.

==== Leeuwin ====
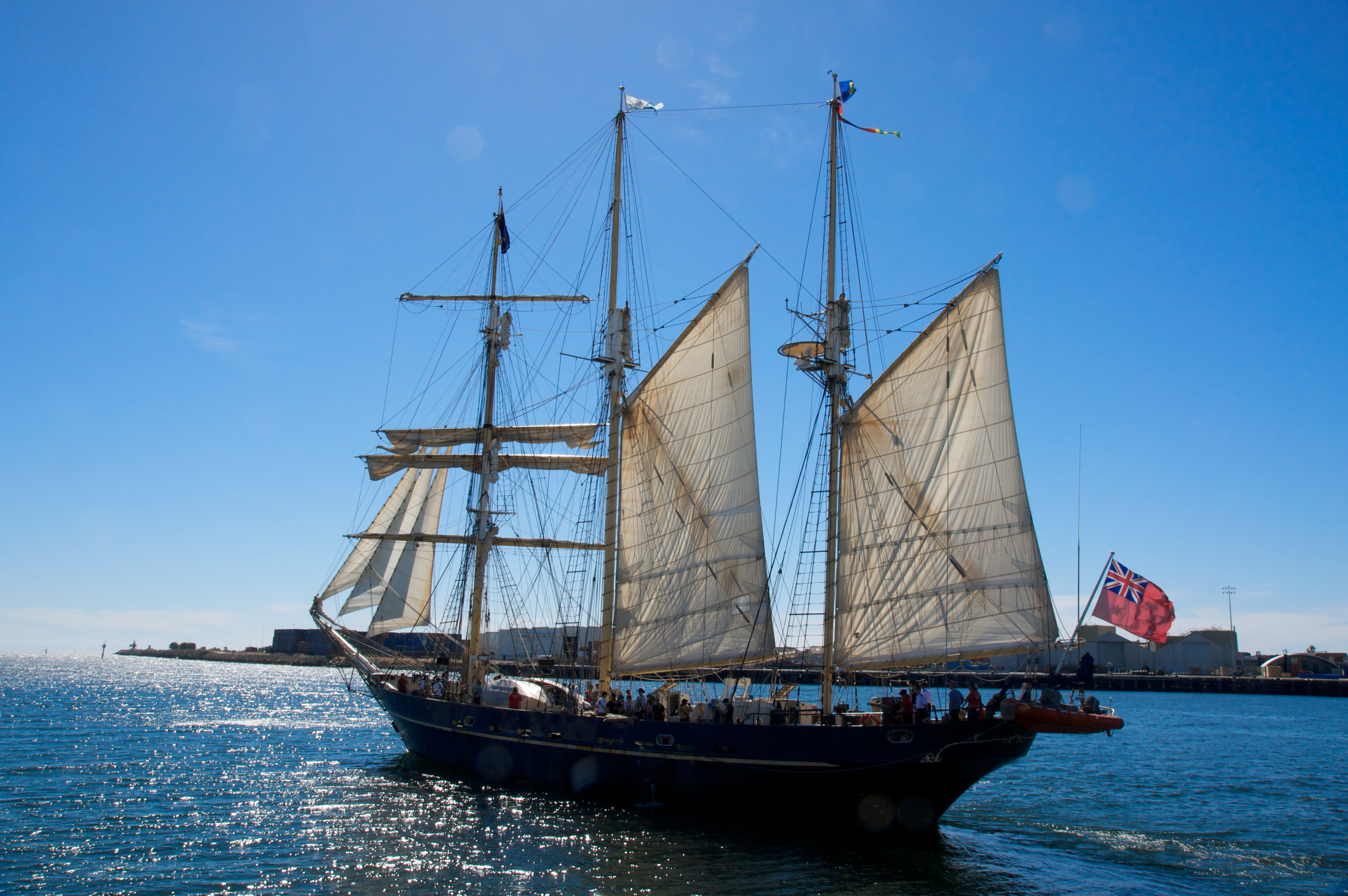
The Leeuwin II

In 2011, Christ Church established a partnership with the Leeuwin Ocean Adventure Foundation whereby every Year 8 student spends a week on board the tall ship as part of the School's outdoor education program. This initiative ended in 2020 after safety concerns following a student jumping off the boat while on voyage.

On the voyage, students learn about sails, lines and nautical terms, health and safety, goal setting and teamwork, interspersed with daily tasks including morning exercises, cleaning duties (known as "Happy Hour") and the Leeuwin Olympics. The boys are sorted into four watches and for the rest of the trip they side with the watch (either blue, white, red and green).

==== Kooringal ====
Each year students from Years 5 to 9 attend Christ Church's outdoor education centre at Kooringal. The key components of the outdoor education program at Kooringal are the promotion of community living, care for the environment and the development of resilience. Students participate in an expedition, canoeing, kayaking, climbing and abseiling. Students learn about the jarrah forest environment and how to identify local flora and fauna.

=== Army cadets ===
The Christ Church Army Cadet unit was established in 1936 as an adjunct to the 44th Battalion. This affiliation ended in 1941 and efforts by staff and students led to the formation of the Senior Cadet Corp in 1942. During World War II, the cadet corp continued to grow. It was during this period that a miniature shooting range was constructed at the school and in 1947, the school's shooting team won the Commonwealth Cup for the first time.

The cadet unit reached its peak in 1966 with over 272 cadets in three companies and a fife band. Changes in government support for school cadets during the 1970s initiated a change to more emphasis on outdoor education. In 1988, participation in cadets was offered as a weekly activity for senior students. Prior to this, cadets was compulsory for boys in Year 10. The focus of training moved from outdoor education activities to military activities using military equipment, with weekend training conducted in military training areas.

From 1988 WO1 Mick O’Sullivan OAM MM and Colonel Bob Peterson RFD took over control of running the Cadet Unit. Mick O'Sullivan himself had received a Military Medal (MM) from rendering first aid under intense fire, during the Vietnam war on 30 July 1971.

From 1993 to 2013, when WO1 Mick O'Sullivan and Colonel Bob Peterson stood down from their roles at the cadet unit, Christ Church Grammar School was awarded the top unit in the state on 16 occasions out of a possible 21.

The cadet unit currently comprises three platoons with over 90 cadets. It remains a voluntary activity with a focus on leadership and self-discipline, offering students an opportunity develop confidence and a wide range of skills.

Several of the cadets have gone on to serve in various roles throughout the Australian Army.

In 2011 the 75-year anniversary of cadets at Christ Church was marked.

=== House system ===
The house system at Christ Church was introduced in 1921 in an effort "to arouse more enthusiasm in the games". Initially, there were three houses – Highbury, Romsey and Queenslea. In 1925, R.L. Beatty donated the Beatty Cup for Inter-House Competition. This cup is awarded annually to the champion house for inter-house sporting and cultural activities. The Eagling Cup is awarded annually to the house with the best scholastic achievement and was donated to the school by Mrs Eagling in 1945. Eagling taught at Christ Church from 1942 to 1945.

Over the years, the number of houses increased to match growth in student numbers. In 2005, headmaster Garth Wynne modified the house system, removing the two boarding houses (McClemans House and Walters House) from the system and integrating the boarding students into the remaining eight day boy houses. Today, there are eight houses in the senior school and four in the preparatory school. The houses are named after significant people and places within the history of the school.

==== Senior school ====
House names (in order of establishment)	Colours	Symbol
Romsey	Navy blue	Falcon
Queenslea	Red	Tiger
Craigie	Gold	Cobra
Wolsey	Sky blue	Wolf
Jupp	Emerald green	Panther
Noake	Wallwork Brown	Owl
Moyes	Bottle green	Knight
Hill	Orange	Bull

==== Preparatory school ====
House names	Colours
Karda (formerly Dale)	Yellow
Kearla (formerly Giles)	Blue
Wardung (formerly Forrest)	Green
Yonga (formerly Stirling)	Red

=== Boarding ===
In 1911, requests were made to Canon McClemans to take boarders. Initially, there was no boarding house and the first boarders resided with the McClemans family in the rectory. Boarding reached its peak in the 1980s when almost a quarter of the student population were boarders. Today, there are 110 boarders who live in the Walters Residential Community. The residential community at Christ Church is organised to facilitate integration between the boarders and day boys enabling boarders to be more involved in the wider school community.

== Alumni ==
=== Old Boys' Association ===
Founded in 1917, the Old Boys' Association (OBA) is an independent body administered by a committee of former students. The association functions to further the interests of the school, to provide support to school and student activities and to encourage social interaction between its members. The OBA also provides funding for a number of scholarships for students of merit, who would otherwise be unable to attend Christ Church. Upon leaving Christ Church, former students are invited to join the Old Boys' Association. The OBA maintains contact with former students through the OBA e-newsletter, social networking and regular reunions.

=== Notable alumni ===
Notable alumni of the school include:

- Piers Akerman – journalist
- Nick Allbrook – musician, member of Pond.
- Matt Burston – basketballer
- Ric Charlesworth – sportsman and coach; politician
- Rod Eddington – businessman
- Tim English – Western Bulldogs AFL footballer
- Andrew Forrest – entrepreneur
- Sir William Heseltine – former private secretary to Queen Elizabeth II
- Chris Lewis – Australian rules footballer
- William Kirby – Australian Dolphin - Olympic and World Championship medallist
- Stuart MacGill – cricketer
- Eric Mackenzie – Australian rules footballer
- Luke McPharlin – Fremantle Dockers AFL footballer
- Liam Henry – St Kilda AFL footballer
- Wayne Martin – former Chief Justice of Western Australia
- David McComb – singer and songwriter, The Triffids
- Andrew McGowan – priest and academic theologian
- Tim Minchin – comedian and musician
- Richard Pestell – professor of oncology and medicine
- Jon Sanders – yachtsman, circumnavigator
- Thomas Swift – Australian rules footballer
- Mike Thackwell – formula 1 racing driver
- Nelson Woss – film producer of Ned Kelly, Red Dog and Red Dog: True Blue

== See also ==
- List of schools in the Perth metropolitan area
- List of boarding schools
