= Aquinas College, Perth =

School in Perth, Western Australia

Aquinas College

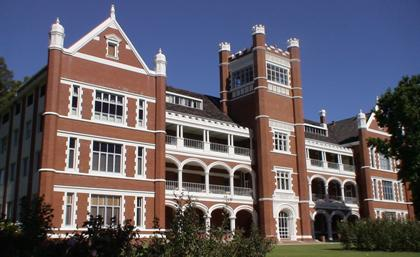
- The school's main building facade

Location
- Salter Point, Perth, Western Australia; Australia; 32°1′27″S 115°51′53″E

Information
- Type: Independent single-sex primary and secondary day and boarding school
- Motto: Latin: Veritas Vincit (Truth Conquers)
- Religious affiliation: Congregation of Christian Brothers
- Denomination: Roman Catholicism
- Patron saint: Saint Thomas Aquinas
- Established: 1894; 132 years ago 1938; 88 years ago
- Sister school: Santa Maria College, Perth
- Trust: Edmund Rice Education Australia
- Chairman: Clive Bingwa
- Headmaster: Robert Henderson
- Staff: ~100
- Years: K–12
- Gender: Boys
- Enrolment: c. 1,330
- Colours: Red and black
- Nickname: Redbacks
- Affiliations: Public Schools Association; Association of Independent Schools of Western Australia; Association of Heads of Independent Schools of Australia; Independent Primary School Heads of Australia
- Alumni: Old Aquinians

Western Australia Heritage Register
- Designated: 17 December 2010
- Reference no.: 2396
- Website: www.aquinas.wa.edu.au

Aquinas College, informally known as Aquinas or AC, is an independent Roman Catholic single-sex primary and secondary day and boarding school for boys, located at Salter Point, a suburb of Perth, Western Australia.

The history of Aquinas begins with Christian Brothers' College, Perth (CBC Perth) which was founded in 1894 on St Georges Terrace in the City of Perth. Aquinas opened in 1938, when the headmaster, boarders and some day students from CBC Perth moved to the new campus at Salter Point. While CBC Perth continued to operate as a day school, Aquinas inherited the College colours of red and black, membership of the Public Schools Association (PSA), as well as the College honour boards, achievements and history for the period 1894–1937.

The campus at Aquinas was built on elevated land which is part of the 69-hectare (171-acre) site at Salter Point. The site includes a large area of bushland on the Mount Henry Peninsula with over two kilometres (one point two miles) of water frontage on the Canning River.

Currently, Aquinas College accepts day students from Kindergarten to Year 12 and boarding students from Years 7 to 12. School fees range from $7,353 for a Kindergarten day student to over $53,514 for a boarding student. The campus includes expansive sporting grounds, and boarding facilities for 210 students.

Aquinas is affiliated with the Public Schools Association, the Association of Independent Schools of Western Australia, the Association of Heads of Independent Schools of Australia, and the Independent Primary School Heads of Australia.

== History ==
=== Foundation ===
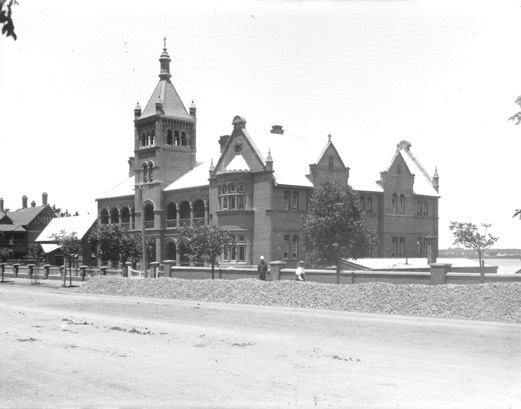
Christian Brothers College west and central wings, built in 1895 and 1900 by the Christian Brothers

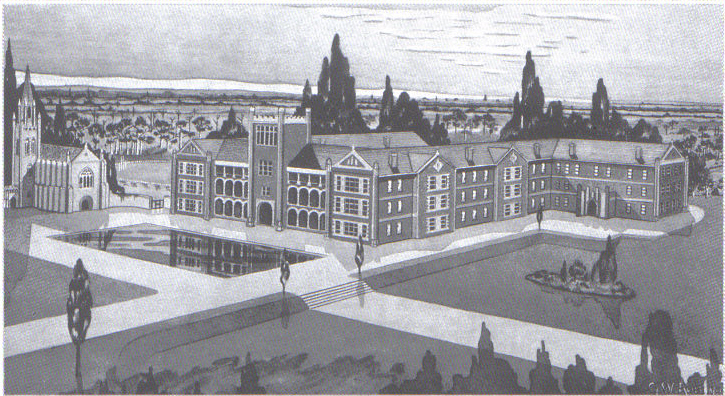
Christian Brothers College student Geoff Robins' 1937 impression painting of Aquinas

The Christian Brothers opened CBC Perth on 31 January 1894. CBC Perth was built on the corner of St Georges Terrace and Victoria Avenue in Perth. The College was also commonly called CBC Terrace.^{[c]} CBC Perth was the first Christian Brothers school as well as the second oldest high school and the second oldest boarding school in Western Australia.

The Brothers were invited to the colony by Bishop Matthew Gibney who knew of the work of the Brothers in Ireland, England, and in the eastern colonies of Australia.

At first, CBC Perth ^{[c]} was a day school. However, due to the rapid population growth in Western Australia during the gold rush, the Christian Brothers were pressured to allow boarders to live in makeshift conditions at the College. The first boarding students were enrolled in June 1896. Accommodation at the site was very limited and overcrowded. In 1917, Brother Paul Nunan, headmaster of the College, set-about acquiring a larger property away from the city centre in order to reside the whole school on a much larger campus.

=== College schism ===
At first, the Brothers entered into negotiations for the purchase of 8 hectares (20 acres) at Point Heathcote on the Swan River. The negotiations fell through and in 1928 the Brothers purchased 95 hectares (234 acres) on the Canning River, just east of the Riverton Bridge, and they named the property Clune Park. The following year the Great Depression started and plans to develop this site were shelved.

In 1936, at the instigation of Brother Paul Keaney, the superior of nearby Clontarf Orphanage, 62.4 hectares (154 acres) were purchased from the Manning family at Mount Henry Peninsula on the Canning River at a cost of £9,925.

In April 1937, builders Snooks and Sons successfully tendered to build the College at a cost of £21,350. Earlier that year, the work of clearing the grounds and preparing the site was taken up vigorously with squads of boys from the old college playing a major role.

In 1937, CBC Perth began to splinter. Boarders and some day boys started moving to the fast developing Aquinas College campus at Salter Point. In 1937, the PSA committee agreed to transfer PSA membership and records of CBC Perth to Aquinas. Although CBC Perth continued as a day school until 1961, Aquinas inherited the College colours red and black, as well as the College honour boards, achievements and history for the period 1894–1937. The inheritance was largely due to the driving efforts of Brother C.P. Foley who was headmaster of CBC Perth and the founding headmaster of Aquinas. Brother Foley was steadfast Aquinas was not a new Christian Brothers school. The Brothers obeyed and in the ensuring schism the heritage of CBC Perth was removed. CBC Perth was no longer a member of the PSA. The colours of CBC Perth became light blue, royal blue, and green, and the college raised new honour boards from 1938 onwards. In 1962 CBC Perth moved to the new campus at Trinity College by the Swan River on the East Perth foreshore.

=== Aquinas ===
The Aquinas College foundation stone was laid on 11 July 1937, and the school opened in February 1938 with 160 boarders and 55-day pupils. Brother C.P. Foley was the first headmaster. The Catholic Archbishop of Perth, Redmond Prendiville, addressed the headmaster and students on 19 November 1938: "With the proud traditions of St Georges Terrace to sustain it, and with the additional advantages of new quarters and ideal surroundings, I have no doubt that Aquinas College will achieve still greater results in the moral and intellectual training of good Catholics and good citizens".

The Edmund Rice Administration wing was built in 1937. The main wing was brick in the late tradition of Federation Romanesque architecture, similar in style to CBC Perth. In its early years, the College extensively used wood framed and galvanized iron clad buildings for both dormitories and classrooms in order to cope with the steadily growing number of pupils.

=== 1951–1979 ===
In 1951, the College's premier oval, which is overlooked by the Edmund Rice Administration wing was named Memorial Oval to commemorate Aquinians who lost their lives at war. A scoreboard was constructed on the oval and is named after Brother C.P. Foley the first headmaster of Aquinas.

The first major classroom block, named the Murphy Wing in honour of Brother V.I. Murphy who was headmaster of the College from 1951 to 1956, was built in 1955.

The construction of the McKenna Wing, which was named after Brother V.C. McKenna who was the deputy headmaster of the College from 1963 to 1966, was completed in 1962. This was soon followed by the junior school in 1963, the Chapel of St Thomas Aquinas in 1966 and the completion of the main boarding wing in 1967.

In 1975, the swimming pool was constructed. It was one of the first 50-metre swimming pools to be constructed in schools. This was followed by the Redmond Learning Centre (library) in 1975, which was named after Brother M.F. Redmond who was on staff at Aquinas for over 45 years.

=== 1980–2000 ===
In 1980 the College embarked on a further expansion which saw the addition, between 1981 and 1983, of the senior classroom block, the manual arts building, the art centre and finally, the gymnasium.

Because of ever increasing pressure on enrolments in the school and the need to involve married and single lay staff in the care of boarders, the college built new boarding accommodation in 1986 and renovated buildings to provide needed classrooms.

In 1987, the Aquinas College board was established with the responsibility for the day-to-day educational needs of the students – this area includes all teaching staff, the headmaster and the head of residential facilities. The major responsibilities of the board include forming policy, planning future developments, and financial management.

At first all teachers at Aquinas were Christian Brothers. The Brothers were gradually replaced by lay-teachers. By 2011, there were only two Christian Brothers actively teaching at the College. The first lay-headmaster of Aquinas, Robert White, was appointed in 2000.

=== Recent years ===
The main entrance of the college was remodelled in 2003, with the cupola from the original Christian Brothers College building on St Georges Terrace as the focal point. The drive has five pillars with dates engraved in them that are significant in the College's history, and a large wall with large brick sections and smaller sections – which symbolise the highs and lows that the College has been through.

In 2004, the Aquinas College Foundation was established, it exists under the auspices of the Christian Brothers, this unit is responsible for acquiring (through donations) and providing the funds necessary to operate, maintain and expand the school. The Foundation operates independently from the Board to ensure a sound financial future for the College, however it does work collaboratively with the College to assist in achieving the College's vision.

2006 saw the College embark on further expansion. Churack Pavilion was constructed on the banks of Memorial Oval and the school canteen was relocated to the farside of the Murphy Wing.

At the beginning of 2011, the Brother Paul Centre was opened on the south-east side of the school. The state-of-the-art facility includes specialist classrooms and playing arenas for badminton, basketball and volleyball.

In late 2016 work started on a fourth boarding house named Brothers' House which was completed in mid-2017. Gibney, Pinder Boor and Nunan are also being refurbished in stages, with the Nunan due to be finished in mid 2018.

The development of a 650-seat recital hall and music centre, a new hockey building, a university centre and new tennis courts was approved in October 2024.

== Headmasters ==
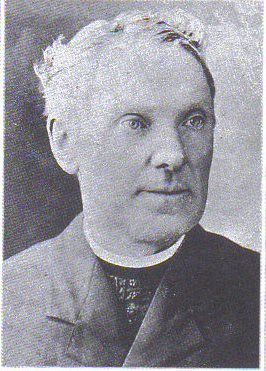
Br. Anthony O'Brien, the first headmaster of CBC Perth

Ordinal	Headmaster	Term start	Term end	Time in office	Notes
1	Br. C.P. Foley	1938	1938	1 year	
2	Br. William V. Green	1939	1944	6 years	
3	Br. Thomas B. Garvey MBE	1945	1951	7 years	
4	Br. Vincent I. Murphy	1951	1956	6 years	
5	Br. Walter G. Hall	1957	1962	6 years	
6	Br. J.C. (Bill) Woodruff	1963	1968	6 years	
7	Br. Leo B. Hassam	1969	1974	6 years	
8	Br. D.F. Drake	1974	1978	5 years	
9	Br. Terrence X. Hann	1979	1986	8 years	
10	Br. John Carrigg	1987	1993	7 years	
11	Br. Kevin Paull	1993	1999	7 years	
12	Bob White	2000	2007	8 years	
13	Mark Sawle	2007	2016	10 years	
14	David McFadden	2017	2022	6 years	
15	Robert Henderson	2023	incumbent	2 years	

Robert Henderson (Class of 1979) is the first Old Aquinian to lead the College.

== Campus ==
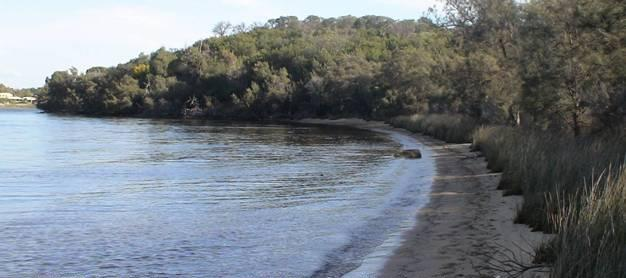
Mount Henry Peninsula, as viewed from the banks of the Canning River

Aquinas College is located on a 62.4-hectare (154-acre) property with three kilometres (1.9 mi) of water frontage along the north bank of the Canning River. The land, which falls within the Manning ward of the City of South Perth, is valued at A$1.2 billion. All of the land belongs to the school which manages and funds the area – including the Mount Henry Peninsula.

The campus comprises a number of buildings and sporting facilities necessary for the day-to-day educational needs of the students. Two of these buildings are of historical significance, the Edmund Rice Administration Wing and the Chapel, which are listed with the Heritage Council of Western Australia.

Mount Henry Peninsula is a land feature and reserve located 11 km (6.8 mi) south of Perth, which is owned by the Christian Brothers as part of the Aquinas property. The region is recognised as a Bush Forever site and is listed on the Register of the National Estate.

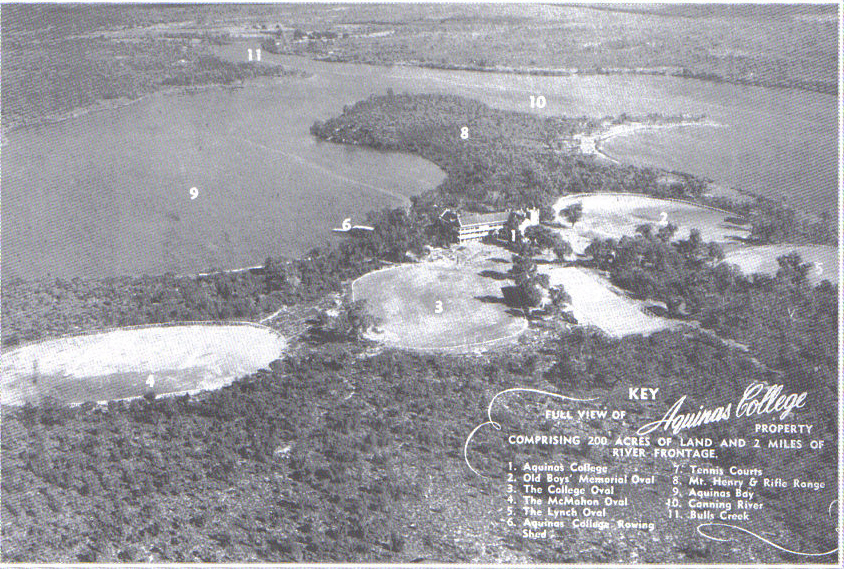
Aerial view of the campus in 1949

The land is managed as a reserve with the Department of Environment and Conservation, Swan River Trust, National Heritage Trust and the City of South Perth for heritage conservation, education and passive recreation values. The College works collaboratively with the Swan River Trust and the City of South Perth on projects relating to the Mount Henry Peninsula including the Mount Henry Peninsula management plan.

=== Memorial Oval ===
The decision to commemorate the oval to the servicemen of Aquinas by building a war memorial oval at the front of the main building was undertaken in by the Old Aquinians association in 1940. An appeal to fund the war memorial oval raised £5,000, Memorial Oval was subsequently opened on 11 November 1951 as a tribute to the servicemen among the Old Aquinians. Outside of the school's usage the ground is used for first-class women's cricket matches between the Western Fury and other state teams.

== Boarding ==
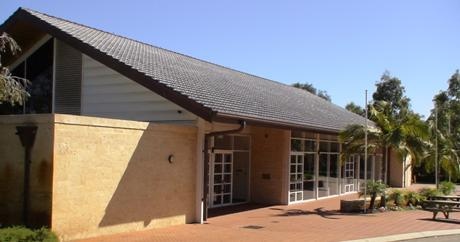
The Hughes dining hall

When Aquinas opened in 1938, it started with 173 boarders; there are currently 216 boarders residing at the College.

All boarders live in one of the four boarding residences on the property.

The boarding houses are:

- Brothers
- Nunan – named after Brother Paul Nunan, who was headmaster of CBC Perth from 1897 to 1908, 1912 to 1918 and 1920 to 1921
- Pinder Boor – named after Alaric Pinder Boor †, who was Head Prefect and Dux of CBC Perth, won a Rhodes scholarship and was later killed in action during World War I
- Gibney – named after Bishop Matthew Gibney, who was the Bishop of Perth from 1886 to 1910

== Sport ==
In 1905, CBC Perth (Aquinas) was a founding member — along with The Church of England Grammar School (Guildford Grammar School), The High School (Hale School), and The Alexander Scotch College (Scotch College) — of the Public Schools Association of Western Australia. In the early years of the PSA, rivalry between the four schools was increasingly competitive. The honour of each school was closely linked with performance on the sporting field. Anglican, Catholic and Presbyterian sectarianism had a huge cultural impact, and the Christian Brothers and students of CBC Perth perceived themselves as underdogs who had to work hard to build traditions at the school:

... we had no traditions to speak of. They had yet to be made – but the builders were even then stripping to the waist. We were late comers into the arena [Hale School was established in 1858], and were despised, an object of scorn and derision, for we had hardly a scholastic attainment, or a single athletic performance to our credit. The stream of prosperity on which you now float so magnificently was not won without labour and effort. – Jack Savage, 1938

When Aquinas opened in 1938, the Brothers and students who made the move from the city also took the sporting records, achievements, and PSA membership of CBC Perth. In 1962, CBC Perth moved from St Georges Terrace to the riverside of East Perth and became Trinity College. When Trinity joined the PSA in 1968 the two schools immediately became arch-rivals with each school claiming the heritage of CBC Perth from 1894–1937. Meanwhile, there were no doubts in the minds of Aquinas students when the crowds at PSA inter-school athletics meetings shouted, "Kill the Micks", they meant Aquinas and not Trinity, given the overwhelming dominance of Aquinas over the rest of the PSA competition.

Aquinas competes in seasonal PSA inter-school sports, as well as one day PSA events which include golf, sailing and surfing. The junior school participates in sailing, softball and squash programs outside the PSA sporting competition.

=== PSA premierships ===
Aquinas has won the following PSA premierships. Premierships won prior to 1938 were done so by Aquinas' predecessor CBC Perth.

Sport	Trophy	Number of championships	Year
Athletics	Alcock Shield	57	1908, 1909, 1910, 1911, 1912, 1913, 1914, 1915, 1916, 1917, 1919, 1927, 1929, 1931, 1932, 1933, 1935, 1936, 1937, 1938, 1944, 1951, 1952, 1957, 1958, 1965, 1966, 1967, 1968, 1969, 1970, 1971, 1973, 1974, 1975, 1976, 1977, 1978, 1979, 1980, 1981, 1982, 1986, 1987, 1993, 1994, 1995, 1997, 1999, 2000, 2003, 2007, 2008, 2009, 2011, 2012, 2014
Badminton	Br. Kelly Cup	1	2003
Basketball	Blackwood Trophy	16	1985, 1991, 1997, 2000, 2002, 2003, 2004, 2005, 2006, 2009, 2015, 2016, 2017, 2020, 2021, 2023
Cricket	Darlot Cup	29	1910, 1926, 1927, 1928, 1931, 1940, 1941, 1944, 1945, 1951, 1958, 1962, 1963, 1964, 1965, 1966, 1967, 1970, 1971, 1972, 1973, 1979, 1981, 1984, 1997, 2004, 2013, 2015, 2016
Cross country	Moyes Trophy	19	1980, 1981, 1996, 1997, 1998, 1999, 2000, 2001, 2005, 2006, 2011, 2012, 2013, 2014, 2015, 2018, 2019, 2020, 2021
Football	Alcock Cup	56	1907, 1908, 1909, 1910, 1911, 1912, 1913, 1914, 1915, 1916, 1918, 1920, 1922, 1923, 1924, 1926, 1927, 1928, 1929, 1930, 1931, 1932, 1933, 1934, 1937, 1940, 1944, 1945, 1949, 1952, 1953, 1954, 1956, 1957, 1963, 1964, 1967, 1968, 1971, 1972, 1975, 1977, 1980, 1981, 1989, 1991, 1992, 1993, 1996, 2000, 2002, 2003, 2008, 2009, 2018, 2024
Golf	P.C. Anderson Cup	2	2001, 2003
Hockey	Ray House Cup	21	1966, 1968, 1969, 1970, 1971, 1972, 1974, 1975, 1976, 1979, 1981, 1982, 1994, 1996, 1998, 2008, 2011, 2013, 2016, 2017, 2025
Rowing	Challenge Cup (Head of the River)	38	1900, 1909, 1910, 1911, 1912, 1915, 1916, 1917, 1921, 1923, 1926, 1927, 1928, 1929, 1930, 1931, 1946, 1949, 1950, 1965, 1966, 1969, 1970, 1972, 1973, 1974, 1975, 1976, 1977, 1980, 1982, 1987, 1989, 1994, 1995, 1997, 1998, 2026
Rowing	C.A. Hamer Cup (Champion School)	15	1983, 1985, 1986, 1987, 1988, 1989, 1990, 1991, 1993, 1994, 1995, 1996, 1997, 1998, 1999
Rugby	Br. Redmond Cup	4	1970, 1972, 1973, 2000
Soccer	Lawe Davies Cup	5	1995, 2002, 2009, 2021, 2022
Swimming	Dr. K.G. Tregonning Cup	15	1910, 1911, 1924, 1938, 1939, 1940, 1941, 1942, 1944, 1945, 1946, 1947, 1964, 1993, 1994
Tennis	W.R. Corr Cup	11	1964, 1969, 1970, 1978, 1990, 1991, 1992, 1993, 1994, 2002, 2009
Volleyball	Br. Carrigg Shield	20	2000, 2001, 2002, 2003, 2004, 2005, 2006, 2007, 2008, 2010, 2011, 2012, 2013, 2017, 2018, 2019, 2020, 2024, 2025, 2026
Water polo	Dickinson Shield	15	1992, 1993, 1994, 1995, 1996, 2000, 2001, 2004, 2005, 2006, 2007, 2015, 2016, 2021, 2024

=== Basketball Team Achievements ===
==== Championship Men (Open) ====
- Australian Schools Championships

(bronze) Third Place: 2015

== Community service ==
The service-learning program at Aquinas was implemented in 1997. Social justice has been part of the religious education program since the mid-1980s.

The College's students were the first to participate in the Red Cross soup patrol, the Adult Migrant conversational English program, and the Kindred Family support program. The College won Volunteering WA's difference award in 1998 and 2001 for innovative and outstanding service to the community. In 2002, the College became the first school in Australia to implement a graduate requirement of community service for senior students.

== See also ==
- List of boarding schools in Australia
- List of schools in the Perth metropolitan area
- Catholic education in Australia
