= Public Schools Association =

School association in Perth, Australia

- Formation: 1905
- Headquarters: Perth, Western Australia
- Members: Aquinas College; Christ Church; Guildford Grammar; Hale School; Scotch College; Trinity College; Wesley College
- Official language: English
- Website: www.psa.wa.edu.au

Established in 1905 the Public Schools Association (PSA) is an association of seven independent boys schools in Perth, Western Australia. The term "public school" references the historical usage of the term and the model of the British public school. The schools compete against each other in athletic competition throughout the year. There are three main events held annually; the Head of the River rowing regatta, the Interschool Athletics Carnival, and the Interschool Swimming Carnival.

== History ==
The PSA was formed in 1905 by Christian Brothers' College, Perth (now Aquinas College), the Church of England Grammar School (now Guildford Grammar School), The High School (now Hale School) and The Alexander Scotch College (now Scotch College) as a group of independent boys schools.

The PSA invited Wesley College to join in 1952, followed by Christ Church Grammar School in 1956 and Trinity College in 1968.

The presidency of the PSA is held by the principal of the "host school" which rotates annually among member schools.

To celebrate the centenary of the PSA in 2005, every student of the PSA was given a commemorative pin.

== Member schools ==
=== Current ===
| School | Location | Enrolment | Founded | Denomination | Boys/girls | Day/boarding | Membership | School colours |
|---|---|---|---|---|---|---|---|---|
| Aquinas College | Salter Point | 1,330 | ♦1938/1894 | Roman Catholic | Boys | Day & boarding | 1905 | Red and black |
| Christ Church Grammar School | Claremont | 1,310 | 1910 | Anglican | Boys | Day & boarding | 1956 | Navy & gold |
| Guildford Grammar School | Guildford | 900 | 1896 | Anglican | Boys/girls | Day & boarding | 1905 | Navy blue, sky blue and white |
| Hale School | Wembley Downs | 1,311 | 1858 | Anglican | Boys | Day & boarding | 1905 | Oxford blue and Cambridge blue |
| Scotch College | Swanbourne | 1,170 | 1897 | Uniting | Boys | Day & boarding | 1905 | Maroon, navy and gold |
| Trinity College | East Perth | 1,200 | ♦1962/1894 | Roman Catholic | Boys | Day | 1968 | Dark blue, light blue & green |
| Wesley College | South Perth | 1,300 | 1923 | Uniting | Boys* | Day & boarding | 1952 | Black, dark green and gold |

*Wesley College is co-educational for students of primary school age (Prep-6), however is exclusively boys only for students of high school age (Year 7 - 12).

♦Both Aquinas and Trinity share a common history with Christian Brothers College (CBC Perth) founded in 1894 on St Georges Tce, Perth. The college was the second high school in Western Australia, and the second boarding school in 1896. In 1905 the college was a founding member of the PSA. In 1937, the PSA committee agreed to transfer PSA membership to Aquinas which opened at Salter Point in 1938. Aquinas inherited the college colours red and black as well as the PSA honours held by CBC Perth. From 1938, CBC Perth was no longer a member of the PSA. The college colours became blue, light blue, and green. In 1962 CBC Perth moved to the new campus at East Perth and was renamed Trinity College. In 1968 Trinity returned as a member of the PSA.

== Sports ==
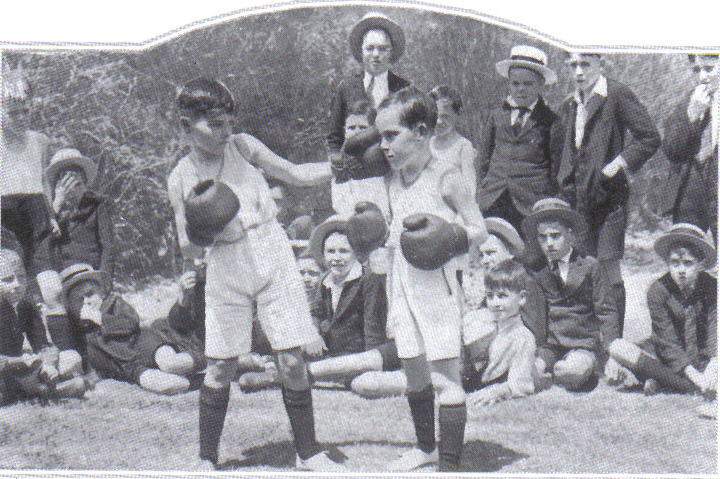
Junior Boxers at CBC (1933). Boxing was once a PSA Sport

Weekly sports fixtures occur during the summer months in basketball, cricket, tennis, volleyball and water polo, with Term 1 Competitions composed of six Rounds (Each School plays each other once), and a smaller Term 4 Competition (three or four rounds). The Major Competitions are only run over Term 1 for these sports.

Winter fixtures include Australian rules football, badminton, cross country running, hockey, rugby union, and soccer, and are played over 10 rounds (each school plays each other once, & 4 schools twice). When Wesley joined in 1952, the six schools played each other twice. With the entry of Trinity in 1968, there have been several experiments with the seven school fixtures, including the current system, one round plus finals.

=== Athletics ===
Introduced in 1905, the athletics carnival trophy is known as the Alcock Shield, it is believed to have been donated by Alcock & Company, suppliers of sporting goods. The carnival was held annually at the WACA Ground in East Perth until 1963, when it moved to the Stadium at Perry Lakes which had been built for the Commonwealth Games of 1962 in Floreat, but is now held at the Western Australian Athletics Stadium.

In 2007, Aquinas won the Alcock Shield for the 52nd time. This victory meant Aquinas had won the athletics carnival more times than the other six schools combined. Aquinas won again in 2008 and 2009. The winning streak was ended by Trinity in 2010.

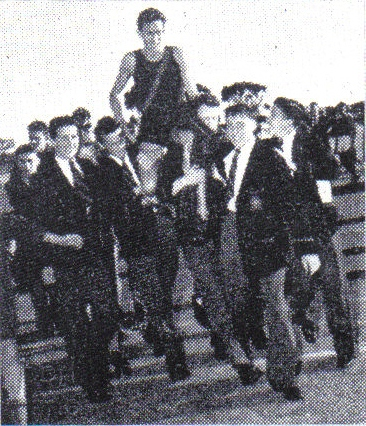
Aquinas runner, Herb Elliott (Olympic Gold Medalist)

=== Badminton ===
Introduced in 2004, badminton is the most recent PSA sport. The badminton trophy, known as the Brother Kelly cup is named after Brother J.A (Tony) Kelly, the founding headmaster of Trinity College.

=== Basketball ===
Basketball became an official PSA sport in 1980, the Blackwood Cup was introduced in the same year to commemorate the long service to Christ Church Grammar School and the PSA of Mr A F Blackwood, Deputy Headmaster from 1966 to 1983. The pre-season basketball competition is known as the Shortland-Jones Basketball competition, which was established in 1980.

=== Cricket ===
Darlot Cup is the 1st XI Cricket trophy of the PSA. The competition began in 1901. Originally, the Darlot Cup was awarded for seasonal competition (October to March). From 1905 to 1915 the Alcock Cup was the calendar year trophy for cricket and football. In 1916, the Alcock Cup became the football trophy, the seasonal cricket competition was discontinued, and the Darlot Cup became the trophy for annual cricket competition. The cup was donated by the Darlot Brothers (Everard Firebrace Darlot and Leonard Hawthorn Darlot).

The competition, which is played on Friday afternoons and all day Saturdays, is a round robin tournament lasting seven weeks during first term, with every team playing each of its six opposition teams once and having one bye per season. The team on top of the table at the end of the round is crowned the champion and is awarded the Darlot Cup for the year.

Points System

Teams are awarded points for winning matches outright, winning on first innings, and also for tied matches. The team with the most points at any time sits on top of the table. The points available are as follows:

- 10 points for a victory on first innings
- 6 points + available 10 from first innings victory for an outright win
- 5 Points for a tied match

Bonus points are also awarded to make sure that if matches do not end with a result, points will still be available. Bonus points are awarded for every run scored while batting and for every wicket taken while bowling. These points usually define the table at the end of the season. The bonus points available are as follows:

- 0.25 for every wicket taken while bowling
- 0.01 for every run scored while batting

Recent winners of the Darlot Cup

- 2011 – Hale School
- 2012 – Scotch College
- 2013 – Aquinas College
- 2014 – Scotch College
- 2015 – Aquinas College
- 2016 – Aquinas College
- 2017 – Christchurch Grammar School
- 2018 – Guildford Grammar School
- 2019 – Hale School
- 2020 – Trinity College and Hale School (shared trophy due to the final two rounds not being completed as a cause of COVID-19 restrictions).
- 2021 – Scotch College
- 2022 – Christ Church Grammar School
- 2023 – Christ Church Grammar School
- 2024 – Wesley College
- 2025 – Hale School
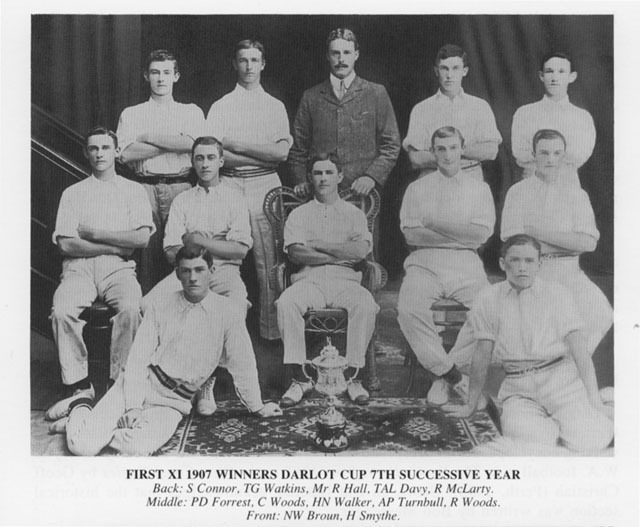
Hale School First XI 1907

=== Cross Country ===
Cross country became a PSA sport in 1980. The cross country trophy, known as the Moyes Cup, was introduced in 1980 to commemorate the long service of Mr. P. M. Moyes, headmaster of Christ Church Grammar School from 1951 to 1981. The seven schools compete against each other once before the 4 all schools races. These usually consist of a relay, 5 km race, relay and the season ending 8 km race.

In 2007 Trinity College ended Aquinas College's two year winning streak by achieving an undefeated season; in other words, they won their six races and finished first in the four all-schools events. From 2011 to 2015 Aquinas won 5 consecutive times. As of 2023, Christ Church Grammar School currently holds the Moyes trophy, having remained undefeated in both individual and all school fixtures over the last two seasons.

=== Football ===
The Alcock Cup was introduced in 1905 for annual cricket competition (The Darlot Cup was for seasonal cricket competition). In 1916 the seasonal cricket competition was discontinued and the Darlot Cup was thereafter awarded for annual competition.

The Alcock Cup in 1916 then became the Football Trophy. The previous inscriptions were obscured with a metal overlay and a new series of Football inscriptions begins with "1916 - CBC". Like the Alcock Shield, the cup was probably given by Alcock & Company, suppliers of sporting goods.

Recent Winners of the Alcock Cup

- 2015 – Guildford Grammar School
- 2016 – Hale School/Scotch College
- 2017 – Hale School
- 2018 – Aquinas College
- 2019 – Hale School
- 2020 – Scotch College
- 2021 – Scotch College
- 2022 – Scotch College
- 2023 – Scotch College
- 2024 – Aquinas College
- 2025 – Hale School
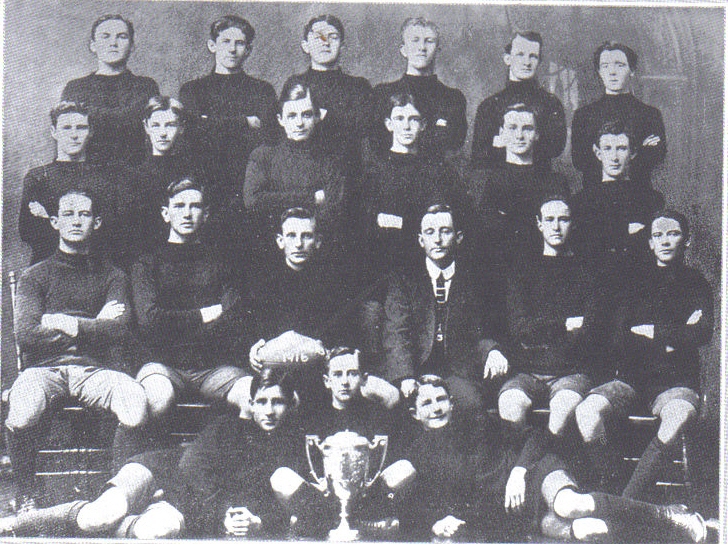
CBC premiership team 1916

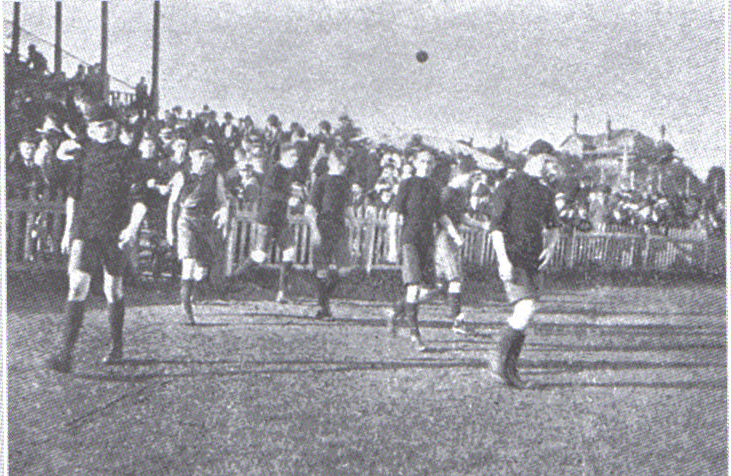
CBC football team at Perth Oval

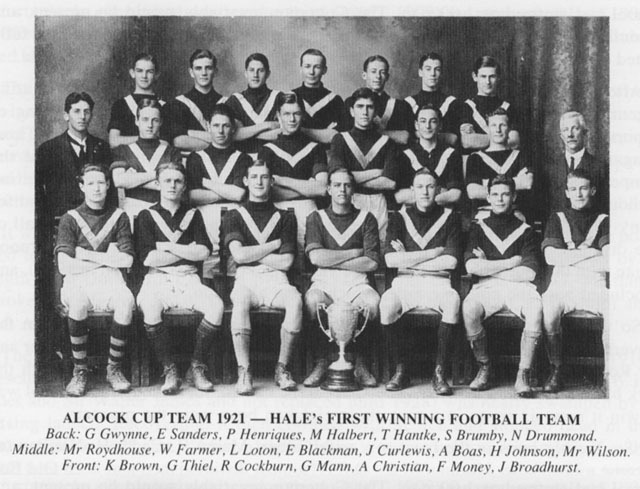
Hale School first football premiership team 1921

=== Golf ===
Became an official PSA Sport in 1999.

=== Hockey ===
Hockey has been a PSA sport since 1959, the Hockey Cup was awarded by the Western Australian Hockey Association. In 2003, the Hockey Cup was renamed the Ray House Hockey Cup in honour of Mr. Ray House for long service to the PSA as delegate and Deputy Headmaster of Christ Church Grammar School.

Points System

The team that finishes the 10 Match season on top of the Premiership Ladder is awarded the Ray House Hockey Cup. In the event of a tie the teams share the Cup. Teams are awarded points as such, and ranked by the number of points achieved:

- 2 Points for a Win
- 1 Point for a Draw

=== Rowing (Head Of The River) ===
On the final day of the rowing season, all PSA Schools attend the Head of the River rowing regatta, the First VIII crews from all of the schools compete for the Head Of The River title. The Challenge Cup pre-dates the formation of the PSA, having been presented 6 times by 1905. Until 1937 the Head of the River Race had been rowed in fours, from 1938 it has been rowed in eights.

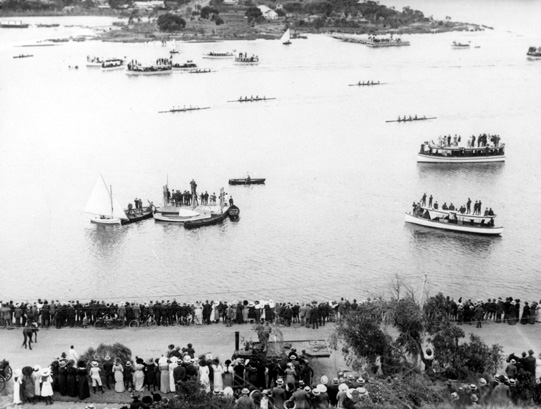
Head of the River 1914

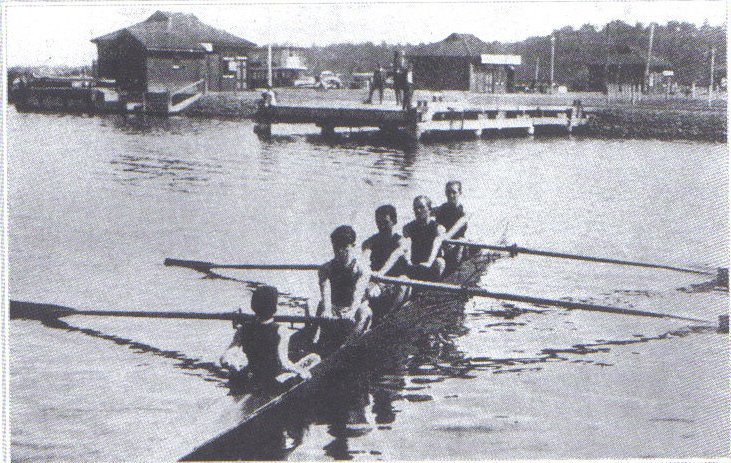
Christian Brothers Rowing Team 1915 - Head of the River Champions

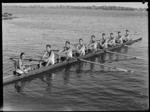
Hale School Rowing Team 1938

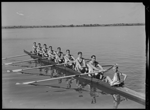
Hale School Rowing Team 1939

=== Rowing (Champion School) ===
The C.A. Hamer Cup was introduced in 1983, and is awarded to the school which scores the highest aggregate points in rowing at the Head of the River. It is named after Mr. C A Hamer who was headmaster of Wesley College from 1964 to 1983. In 2013 Guildford Grammar School won the Hamer Cup.

=== Rugby ===
Rugby became a PSA Sport in 1961, and in 1963 the Rugby cup was renamed the Brother Redmond Cup, in honor of Brother M F Redmond, who was an influential teacher and sportsmaster at Aquinas College over a span of 45 years.

Although the Trophy was first presented in 1963, the PSA Headmasters decreed at a meeting in 1962, that because all PSA schools had competed in Rugby since the first competition in 1961, then the original two years would also be included on the trophy.

=== Soccer ===
Soccer became a PSA Sport in 1987. The soccer trophy is named after Mr D.A. Lawe Davis, headmaster of Guildford Grammar School from 1957 to 1978.

=== Surfing ===
Surfing became an official PSA Sport in 1998. The Schools compete for the PSA Schools Sirocco Shield.

=== Swimming ===
The PSA swimming carnival is an annual event, which has been held since 1904, and pre-dates the establishment of the PSA. In 1905, it became an official PSA Sport. In 1990 the Cup was renamed The Dr. K.G. Tregonning Cup after Dr. Ken Tregonning, headmaster of Hale School 1967–1988.

=== Tennis ===
The PSA tennis cup is named after Mr W R Corr (W.R. Corr Cup), a long-serving teacher and tennis coach at Hale School.

The Ray Gamble Trophy, is the competition that takes place during Term 4 of each school year. It acts as a pre-season cup for the upcoming school year.

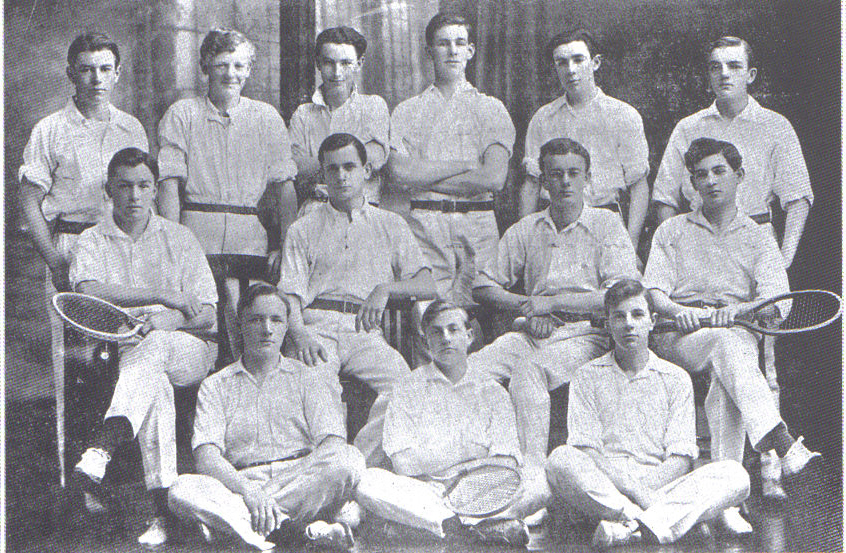
CBC Tennis Team 1919

=== Volleyball ===
Volleyball became a PSA Sport in 2000. The volleyball trophy is known as the Brother Carrigg Shield, after Brother J. Carrigg, long serving headmaster at Both Aquinas College and Trinity College. Aquinas had won every year except for 2009 when Trinity beat Wesley in a thrilling finale to halt Aquinas' dominance. In 2010, Aquinas beat Wesley in the final fixture to share to trophy with Wesley and Trinity.

=== Waterpolo ===
The Waterpolo trophy is called the Dickinson Shield, after Mr. W. Dickinson, long-serving headmaster of Scotch College. Waterpolo only became an official PSA Sport in 1992.

== Trophies awarded ==
| Sport | Competition established | Became a PSA sport | Trophy name |
|---|---|---|---|
| Athletics | 1905 | 1905 | Alcock Shield |
| Badminton | 1998 | 2003 | Brother Kelly Cup |
| Basketball | 1980 | 1980 | Blackwood Cup |
| Cricket | 1901 | 1905 | Darlot Cup |
| Cross Country | 1980 | 1980 | Moyes Cup |
| Football | 1905 | 1905 | Alcock Cup |
| Golf | 1999 | 1999 | PSA Schools' Golf Championship |
| Hockey | 1959 | 1959 | Ray House Hockey Cup |
| Rowing (Head of the River) | 1899 | 1899 | Challenge Cup |
| Rowing (Champion School) | 1905 | 1983 | C.A. Hamer Cup |
| Rugby | 1961 | 1961 | Brother Redmond Cup |
| Soccer | 1987 | 1987 | Lawe Davies Cup |
| Surfing | 1998 | 2002 | PSA Schools Sirocco Shield |
| Swimming | 1904 | 1923 | Dr. K.G. Tregonning Cup |
| Tennis | 1963 | 1963 | W.R. Corr Cup |
| Volleyball | 2000 | 2000 | Brother Carrigg Shield |
| Waterpolo | 1992 | 1992 | Dickinson Shield |

== See also ==
- Independent Girls Schools Sports Association (Perth)
- List of schools in Western Australia
