= List of Old Guildfordians (Western Australia) =

Old Guildfordians are former students of Guildford Grammar School, an Anglican Church school in Guildford, a suburb of Perth, Western Australia.

The source of most of the information below about each Old Guildfordian's years of attendance, and some of the information about their accomplishments, is the list of Accomplished Old Guildfordians, published by the Old Guildfordians Association Inc.

== Vice Regal ==
- Sir Francis Burt AC, KCMG, QC (1931–1935) – Governor of Western Australia
- Sir Wallace Kyle GCB, KCVO, CBE, DSO, DFC (1922–1927) – Governor of Western Australia
- David Malcolm AC, QC (1950–1955) – Lieutenant Governor of Western Australia

== Academia and Science ==
=== Chancellors and Vice-Chancellors ===
- Donald Aitken (1938–1941) – Chancellor, University of Western Australia
- John L. C. Wickham (1929–1936) – Chancellor, Murdoch University

=== Others – Academia and Science ===
- Ian Alexander (1954–1964) – Adjunct Professor, Curtin University
- Jason Cyster (1980-1984) - Immunologist, Member of the American Academy of Arts and Sciences and the National Academy of Sciences, Professor in the Department of Microbiology and Immunology at the University of California, San Francisco
- Michael Gannon (1983–1988) – obstetrician and gynaecologist; President of the Australian Medical Association
- Barry Ninham AO DSc FAA (1945–1952) – Founder and Head of the Department of Applied Mathematics, Australian National University
- Colin Ramm - Dean of the Faculty of Science at the University of Melbourne

== Business ==
- Walter Harper - Founding director and Chairman (1921-1953) of Wesfarmers
- John Roberts (1943–1947) – Founding chairman and executive director of Multiplex

== Law ==
=== Chief Justice ===
- Sir Francis Burt AC, KCMG, QC (1931–1935) – Chief Justice of Western Australia
- David Malcolm AC, QC (1950–1955) – Chief Justice of Western Australia
- Edmund Drake-Brockman (1897–1902) – Chief Justice of the Commonwealth Court of Conciliation and Arbitration

=== Others – Law ===
- John L. C. Wickham (1929–1936) – Justice of the Supreme Court of Western Australia
- David Newnes – Justice of the Supreme Court of Western Australia and subsequently the Court of Appeal of Western Australia
- Michael Feutrill – Justice of the Federal Court of Australia

== Media, Entertainment, Culture and the Arts ==
- Piers Akerman (1965–1967) – journalist, editor (The Advertiser, Adelaide, The Sunday Herald Sun, Melbourne); columnist (The Daily Telegraph, Sydney) (also attended Christ Church Grammar School)
- Keir Beck (1977–1987) – stuntman, film director
- Frederick "Ben" Carlin (1926–1929) – adventurer (first and only person to circumnavigate the world in an amphibious vehicle)
- Andrew Denton (1977) – television producer, comedian, television presenter and radio presenter
- N'fa Forster-Jones – hip hop recording artist, best known as the frontman for 1200 Techniques (winner, ARIA Award)
- Brendon Julian (1985–1987) – television sports presenter
- Karl Langdon (1981–1985) – radio sports presenter
- Heath Ledger (1987–1996) – actor (winner, Academy Award for Best Supporting Actor), director
- Kenneth (Seaforth) Mackenzie (1927–1929) – poet, novelist
- Jamie (Stormie) Mills (1979–1984) – street/visual artist
- Paul Murray (1963–1967) – journalist, editor, columnist (The West Australian); radio presenter (6PR)
- Julian (Randolph) Stow (1950–1952) – writer, novelist and poet
- Carl Vine (1967–1971) – composer of contemporary classical music
- Archie Weller (1968–1975) – writer of novels, short stories and screen plays

== Military ==
=== Chiefs of Services ===
- Sir Alwyn Ragnar Garrett, KBE, CB (1922–1927) – Chief of the General Staff, Australian Army
- Edmund Hudleston GCB, CBE, ADC - Vice-Chief of the Air Staff, Royal Air Force, Commander of Allied Air Forces Central Europe
- Sir Wallace Kyle GCB, KCVO, CBE, DSO, DFC (1922–1927) – Vice-Chief of the Air Staff, Royal Air Force

=== Others – Military ===
- Arnold Potts DSO, OBE, MC (1911–1914) – Brigadier, led 21st Brigade of the Second AIF during its defence of the Kokoda Trail during the Second World War

== Politics and Public Service ==
=== Premiers ===
- Kim Hames (1966–1970) – Deputy Premier, Minister in various portfolios, Barnett Ministry, Western Australia
- Arthur Watts – Deputy Premier, McLarty-Watts Ministry, Brand-Watts Ministry, Western Australia

=== Cabinet Ministers ===
- John Day (1968–1972) – Minister in various portfolios, Barnett Ministry, Western Australia
- Senator Tom Drake-Brockman – Minister in various portfolios, Second Gorton Ministry, McMahon Ministry and Fraser caretaker ministry, Australia
- Donna Faragher - Minister for the Environment and Minister for Youth (youngest woman ever appointed as a Cabinet Minister in Western Australia) Barnett Ministry, Western Australia
- Sir Gordon Freeth KBE – Minister in various portfolios, Australia

=== Other Members of Parliament ===
- Ian Alexander (1954–1964) – Member of the Legislative Assembly of Western Australia for the Electoral district of Perth
- Richard Burt (1924–1927) – Member of the Legislative Assembly of Western Australia for the Electoral district of Murchison-Eyre
- Senator Arthur (Winston) Crane (1954–1957) – Senator for Western Australia
- Ken Dunn – Member of the Legislative Assembly of Western Australia for the Electoral district of Darling Range
- Mervyn Forrest – Member of the Legislative Council of Western Australia for the North Province (also attended Hale School)
- John Hallett – Member of the Australian House of Representatives for the Division of Canning
- Vernon Hamersley – Member of the Legislative Council of Western Australia for the Central Province
- John Hearman – Member of the Legislative Assembly of Western Australia for the Electoral district of Blackwood, Speaker of the Legislative Assembly
- Guy Henn (1921) – Member of the Legislative Assembly of Western Australia for the Electoral district of Leederville and the Electoral district of Wembley (also attended Lancing College, Surrey)
- Tom Herzfeld – Member of the Legislative Assembly of Western Australia for the Electoral district of Mundaring
- Edward House – Member of the Legislative Council of Western Australia for South Province
- Senator Edmund Piesse (1910-1917) - Senator for Western Australia
- Gary Snook - Member of the Western Australian Legislative Assembly for the Electoral district of Moore
- Jack Thompson – Member of the Legislative Council of Western Australia for South Province
- Senator Peter Whish-Wilson (1983–1985) – Senator for Tasmania

=== Others – Politics and Public Service ===
- Tudor Harvey Barnett AO (1938–1942) – Director-General of Security, the head of the Australian Security Intelligence Organisation (ASIO), 1981–1985
- Sir Gordon Freeth KBE – Ambassador to Japan, High Commissioner to the United Kingdom

== Sport ==
=== Athletics ===
- John Mackenzie (1978–1982) – competed in Commonwealth Games (Victoria, British Columbia, 1994)

=== Australian rules football ===
- Corey Adamson (2005–2009) – AFL player (West Coast Eagles)
- Matt Clape (1985–1986) – AFL player (Carlton, West Coast Eagles)
- James Davies (1940–1944) – WANFL and VFL player (Swan Districts, Carlton, Claremont) (Sandover Medallist, 1944)
- David Ellard (2005–2006) – AFL player (Carlton)
- Zac Fisher (2011–2015) – AFL Player (Carlton Football Club)
- Cruize Garlett (2005–2006) – AFL player (North Melbourne)
- Dalton Gooding (1968–1972) – WANFL player (Claremont), Chairman, West Coast Eagles
- Paul Gow – AFL player (Footscray)
- Larry Kickett (1970–1972) – WANFL player (East Perth) (member, East Perth premiership team, 1978)
- Karl Langdon (1981–1985) – AFL player (West Coast Eagles) (member, West Coast Eagles premiership team, 1992)
- Griffin Logue (2010–2015) – AFL Player (Fremantle Football Club)
- John McGuire (1970–1972) – WANFL player (East Perth) (member, East Perth premiership team, 1978)
- Luke Miles (1999–2003) – AFL player (St Kilda)
- Gerald Mitchell (1945–1951) – WANFL player (East Fremantle)
- Clancee Pearce (2006–2007) – AFL player (Fremantle) (also attended Chisholm Catholic College)
- Alexander Rance (2005–2006) – AFL player (Richmond)
- Sam Taylor (2012–2016) – AFL Player (Greater Western Sydney Giants)
- Gerald Ugle (2007–2010) – AFL Player (Greater Western Sydney Giants)
- Jordan Clark (2017–2018) – AFL Player (Geelong Football Club)

=== Baseball ===
- Corey Adamson (2005–2009) – international player (Australia, San Diego Padres)

=== Cricket ===
- Kade Harvey (1985–1992) – state player (Western Australia)
- Brendon Julian (1985–1987) – national player (Australia)
- John McGuire (1970–1972) – captain of Aboriginal team that toured UK, 1988
- David Moody (2008–2012) – state player (Western Australia)
- Tom Moody (1979–1983) – national player (Australia) and international coach (Sri Lanka, Sunrisers Hyderabad)
- Stewart Walters (1996–2000) – county player (Surrey, Glamorgan)

=== Olympics ===
- Graham Gipson (1945–1950) – athletics, Melbourne 1956 (silver medallist)
- Geoffrey Hale (1951–1953) – rowing (men's eight), Rome 1960
- Robin Jeffery (2000–2004) – slalom canoeing (C-2 event), London 2012
- Roger Ninham (1950–1955) – rowing (men's eight), Rome 1960; rowing (men's coxless pair), Tokyo 1964
- Kevin O'Halloran (1951–1955) – swimming, Melbourne 1956 (gold medallist)
- Ronald Snook (1985–1989) – rowing (quadruple sculls), Atlanta 1996
- John Steffenson (1992-1996) - athletics, Athens 2004 (silver medallist)
- Shane Tonkin (1986–1988) – baseball, Atlanta 1996

=== Rowing ===
- Sir Gordon Freeth KBE – competed in Empire Games (coxed fours), Sydney, 1938 (gold medallist)

== See also ==
- List of schools in Western Australia
- List of boarding schools
- Public Schools Association
