= Stirling Square =

Stirling Square may refer to: -

- Stirling Square (Guildford) in Guildford, Western Australia
