= Malvina =

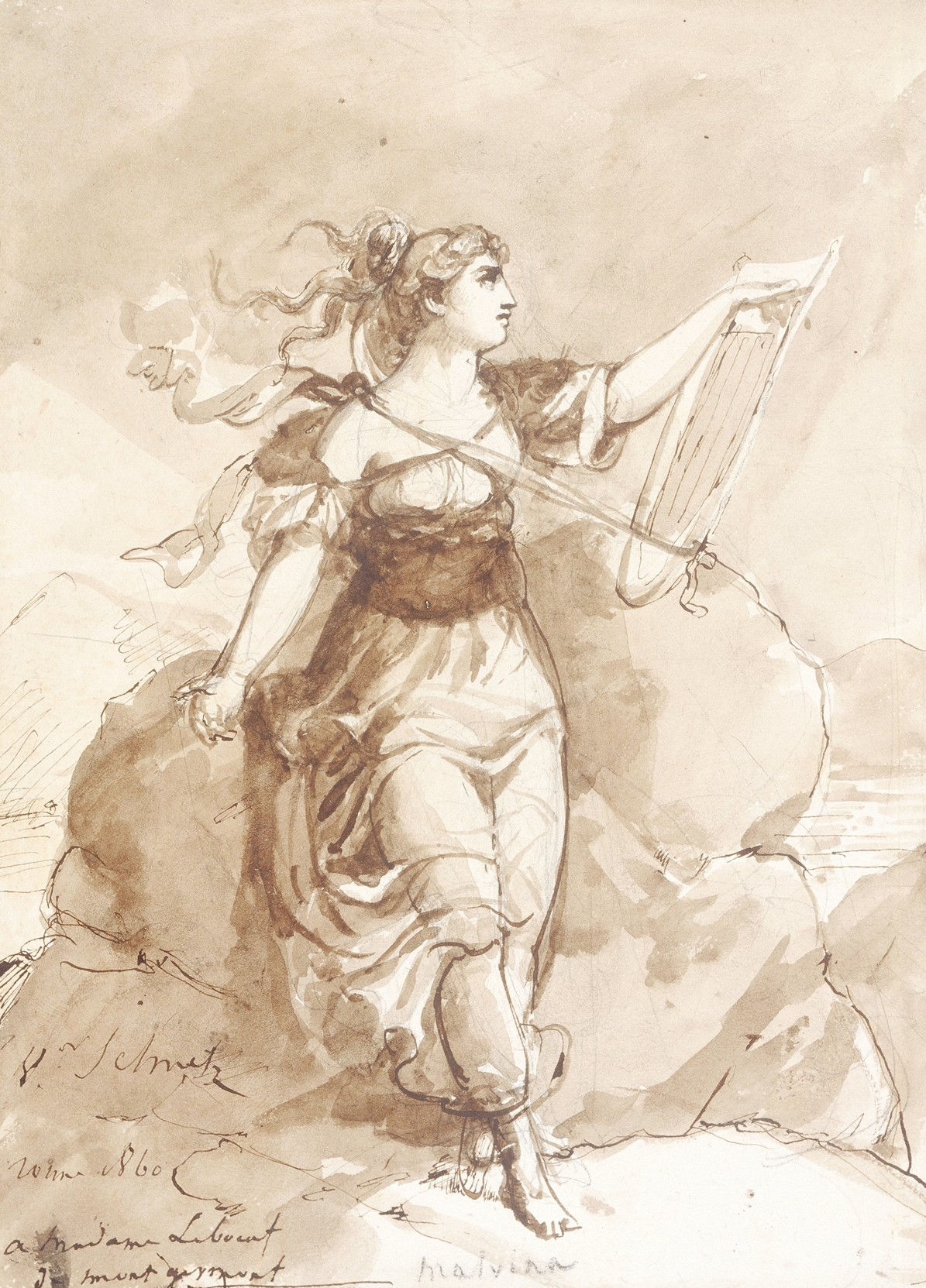
- Malvina (1860) by Jean-Victor Schnetz
- Gender: Female

Origin
- Language: Scottish Gaelic
- Derivation: Mala-mhìn
- Meaning: "smooth brow"

Malvina is a feminine given name derived from the Scottish Gaelic Mala-mhìn, meaning "smooth brow". It was invented by the 18th century Scottish poet James Macpherson.

The Argentinian name for the Falkland Islands, Las Malvinas, is not etymologically related to Malvina, but is instead derived from the name of St Malo, a seaport in Brittany.

== People ==
- Malvina Bolus (1906–1997), Canadian historian, art collector, editor of the Hudson's Bay Company magazine "The Beaver"
- Malvina Garrigues (Schnorr von Carolsfeld) (1825–1904), Danish-German operatic soprano
- Malvina Hoffman (1887–1966), American sculptor
- Malvina Longfellow (1889–1962), American stage and silent movie actress
- Malvina Major (born 1943), New Zealand singer
- Malvina Mehrn (1862–1960), Danish animal rights activist
- Malvina Pastorino (1916–1994), Argentine film actress
- Malvina Reynolds (1900–1978), American folk/blues singer-songwriter and political activist
- Malvina Shanklin Harlan (1839–1916), American wife of a U.S. Supreme Court Justice, grandmother of another U.S. Supreme Court Justice, and author of a 1915 memoir
- Malvina Bovi Van Overberghe (1900–1983), Belgian operatic soprano known as Vina Bovy
- Malvina Evalyn Wood (1893–1976), Australian university librarian and college warden

== Fictional characters ==
- Malvina is the bride or lover of Oscar in the Ossian cycle of James Macpherson.
- Thomas Campbell's poem Lord Ullin's Daughter was translated into the Russian language by the Romantic poet Vasiliy Zhukovsky. In Zhukovsky's translation, the title character, who is left unnamed in Campbell's original, is given the name Malvina, which the Russian poet likely borrowed from James Macpherson's Ossian. Vladimir Nabokov has translated Zhukovsky's translation into English to demonstrate the changes that were made.
- Malvina, the girl with blue hair – a doll-heroine from Aleksey Tolstoy's 1936 book The Golden Key, or the Adventures of Buratino.
- Malvina is also the name of the main antagonist in the 1992 Mexican telenovela María Mercedes.
