= Percy Henn =

Clergyman and teacher (1865–1955)

The Reverend Canon Percy Umfreville Henn
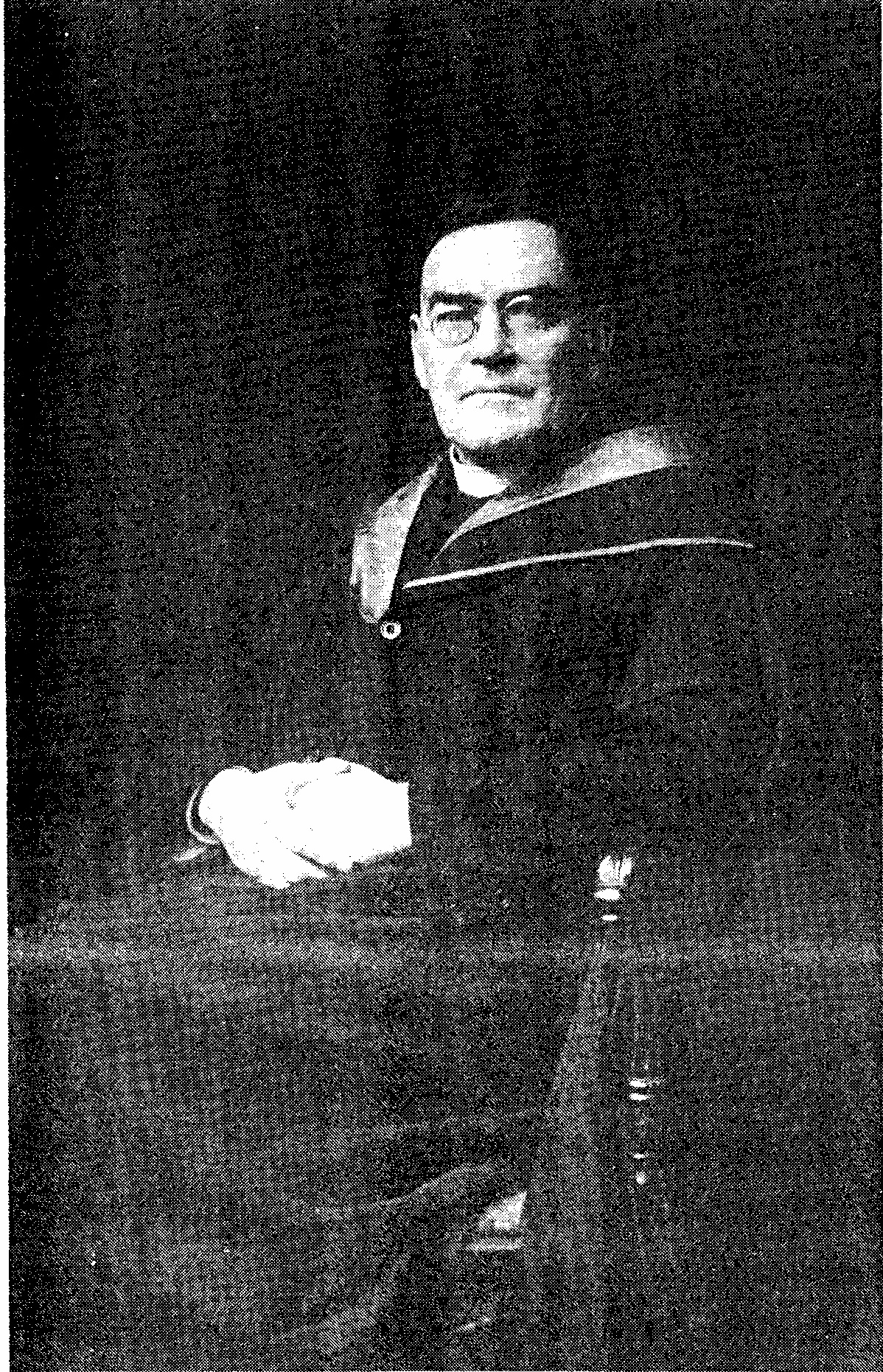
- Percy Henn in 1923
- Born: 21 January 1865; Manchester, England
- Died: 25 February 1955 (aged 90); Perth, Western Australia, Australia
- Occupation(s): Reverend, school headmaster
- Spouse: Jean Elliott
- Children: 4
- Parent(s): Rev. John Henn and wife Catherine

Percy Umfreville Henn (21 January 1865 – 25 February 1955) was a clergyman and teacher in England and later Western Australia. He is best known for his time as Headmaster at Guildford Grammar School and later for the building of the Chapel of SS. Mary and George.

Henn gained his BA in 1887 and MA in 1890 from Worcester College at Oxford University. He taught at various schools until 1900, when he became a missionary in Western Australia in country towns. In Western Australia Henn married Jean Elliott and had four children. After further religious work in regional WA, he moved to Guildford, Western Australia and became a leading force behind Guildford Grammar School's Guildford Grammar School Chapel and preparatory school. He died in 1955 at age 90.

== Early years ==
Henn was born in Manchester, England, as the tenth child of Rev. John Henn and his wife Catherine, née Holcroft. His older brother, Sydney Henn, became a member of parliament. Henn was educated at Christ's Hospital, London, as a bluecoat boy, and then at Worcester College, Oxford, on a scholarship. He graduated with a Bachelor of Arts in 1887, proceeding to a Master of Arts three years later.

== Early career ==
Henn decided, before taking on a spiritual career, that he would become a teacher. He began his career as an assistant master at Hurstpierpoint College, West Sussex (one of the Woodard Schools, a series of eleven schools founded by Nathaniel Woodard). There, he became interested in education through religion, and became an ordained priest in 1891. He then became Chaplain at Hurstpierpoint in 1892. Henn became recognised as a teacher when he became a founding headmaster at Worksop College in Nottinghamshire; however he resigned in 1899 amidst differences with a new superior who disagreed with Henn's philosophy of a school grounds with beautiful buildings dominated by a chapel.

== Looking abroad ==
In January 1900, Henn arrived as a missionary in Perth, Western Australia. After a short spell in Kalgoorlie, he moved to Geraldton as rector (parish priest). On 3 April 1902, in Geraldton, Henn married Jean Elliott. They eventually had four children together, one of whom, Guy Gavin Henn, became a member of parliament. Henn became a rector in Northam for three years (1902–1905), signifying the end of his missionary term. He returned to England and became organising secretary in the Society for the Propagation of the Gospel in the dioceses of Canterbury and Rochester.

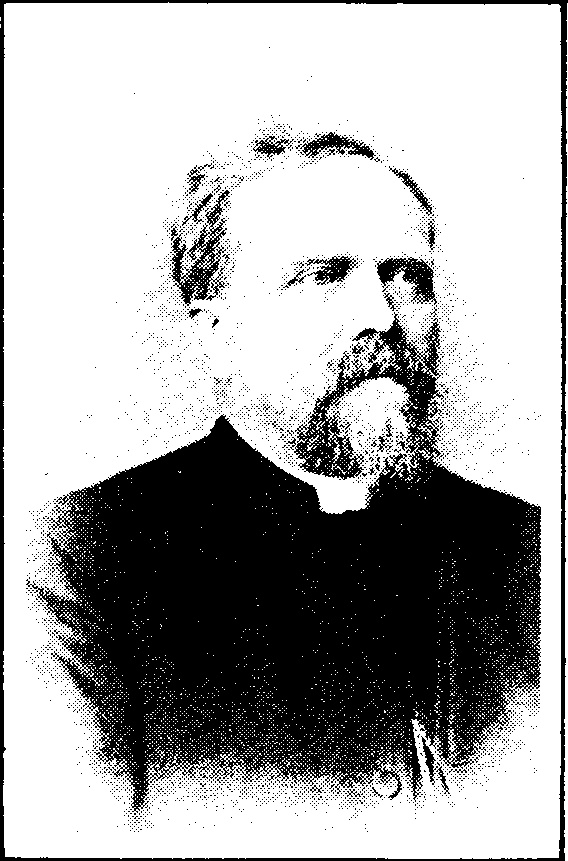
Revd. John Henn, Percy Henn's father

== Return to Western Australia ==
=== A chapel for Guildford ===
In 1910, Henn returned to Perth to take up the position of Headmaster of Guildford Grammar School. His task was to oversee the first attempt by the Church of England at secondary education since 1873. His first thought for the new school was the provision of a chapel. To him, a Church school without a chapel was "like the play of Hamlet without the Prince of Denmark." Henn immediately sent out a circular entitled "A Church of England Secondary School for Western Australia." This circular fell into the hands of one Cecil H. Oliverson, whom Henn eventually persuaded to pay the full cost of the Chapel, the Chapel of SS. Mary and George.

=== Relations with Christ Church Grammar School ===
In 1918, Guildford Grammar School and Christ Church Grammar School were placed under the same ruling council. Henn became a member immediately; however, Christ Church did not gain representation until 1920. In 1918, Henn suggested that Christ Church Grammar School's oval be widened and made a first-class playing field.

=== Guildford Preparatory School ===
In 1912, a Cecil Priestley was temporarily employed by Henn as a member of the Guildford Grammar School staff. It seems today that he conceived the idea of a Guildford Preparatory School. Henn was enthusiastic about this, however the Guildford Preparatory School did not integrate with the main Guildford Grammar School until 1921, when it became Guildford Grammar Preparatory School, and Priestley resigned from his position as the Head of the Prep School around this time.

Henn became canon of St George's Cathedral, Perth in 1921. He has a Guildford Grammar School house named after him, Henn's House, founded 1927.

== Later life and death ==
Henn left his job as Headmaster at Guildford Grammar School in 1925 and returned to England. However, he could not be kept away from Western Australia and returned again to become founding warden of St Georges College, within the University of Western Australia. Henn retired permanently to Perth in 1933 and died in 1955, age 90. Henn's ashes reside in the Guildford Grammar School Chapel, with a stone slab to commemorate this situated on the north side of the sanctuary.

== See also ==
- Christ's Hospital
- Worcester College
- Worksop College
- St George's Cathedral, Perth
