= John Wickham =

John Wickham may refer to:

- John Wickham (British Army officer) (born 1897), British brigadier, on List of British generals and brigadiers
- John Wickham (attorney) (1763–1839), 18th-century American attorney
- John A. Wickham, Jr. (1928–2024), 20th-century American general
- John Clements Wickham (1798–1864), 19th-century British ship captain, later a police magistrate in Brisbane, Queensland, Australia
- John L. C. Wickham (1919–2018), Western Australian Supreme Court judge
- John Wickham (urologist), 1927–2017
- John Wickham Rhodes (1920–1996)
- John Wickham Legg (1843–1921), English physician and theologian
- John Wickham Flower (1807-1873), British solicitor, amateur geologian
- John Wickham Steeds (* 1940), British physicist
- John Wickham Griffith (1795–1859), English cleric
- Henry John Wickham (1829–?), English cleric
- John Wickham House, building of 1812
- John Wickham (print), print by Max Rosenthal, 1917, Cleveland Museum of Art
- John Wickham Barnes, F.R.C.S., L.S.A, scientific article, 1899
