= St Matthew's Church, Guildford =

St Matthew's Anglican Church, Guildford
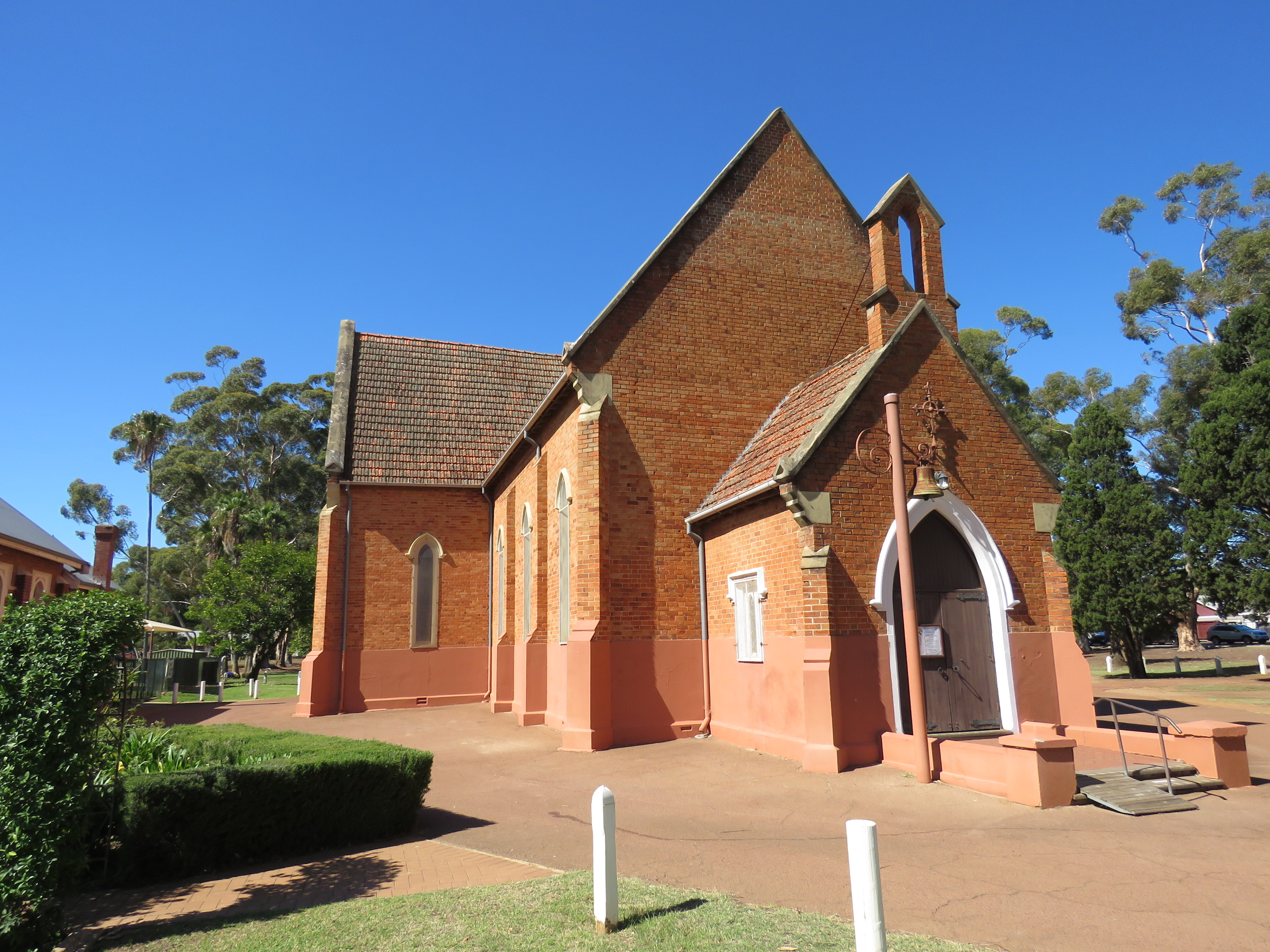
- The church in 2021
- St Matthew's Anglican Church, Guildford
- 31°53′54″S 115°58′12″E
- Location: Stirling Square, Guildford, Western Australia
- Country: Australia
- Denomination: Anglican
- Website: St Matthew's Anglican Church Guildford

History
- Status: Church
- Founded: 1836 / 1860
- Dedication: St Matthew
- Consecrated: 15 October 1873

Architecture
- Functional status: Active
- Architect: Frederick Sherwood
- Years built: 1860 / 1873

Specifications
- Materials: Brick, terracotta tiles

Administration
- Province: Western Australia
- Diocese: Perth
- Parish: Guildford

Western Australia Heritage Register
- Official name: St Matthew's Church
- Type: State Registered Place
- Criteria: 11.1., 11.2., 11.4., 12.2., 12.3, 12.4., 12.5.
- Designated: 20 October 1995
- Part of: Guildford Historic Town (02915)
- Reference no.: 2482

St Matthew's Church is a heritage-listed Anglican church in Stirling Square, Guildford, Western Australia. The church is part of the Anglican Diocese of Perth.

Saint Matthew's was the first church to be built in the Swan parish. It was a small octagonal mud-brick church, hastily built on land donated by Governor James Stirling on his Woodbridge estate, next to where Guildford Grammar School now stands.

== First structure ==
Governor Stirling laid the foundation stone on 6 September 1836, and it was opened a few months later before it was finished. It was not completed until 1839 and was consecrated on 23 November 1848. It was later demolished but the graveyard still remains. St Matthew's became the separate parish of Guildford in 1854.

== Second structure ==
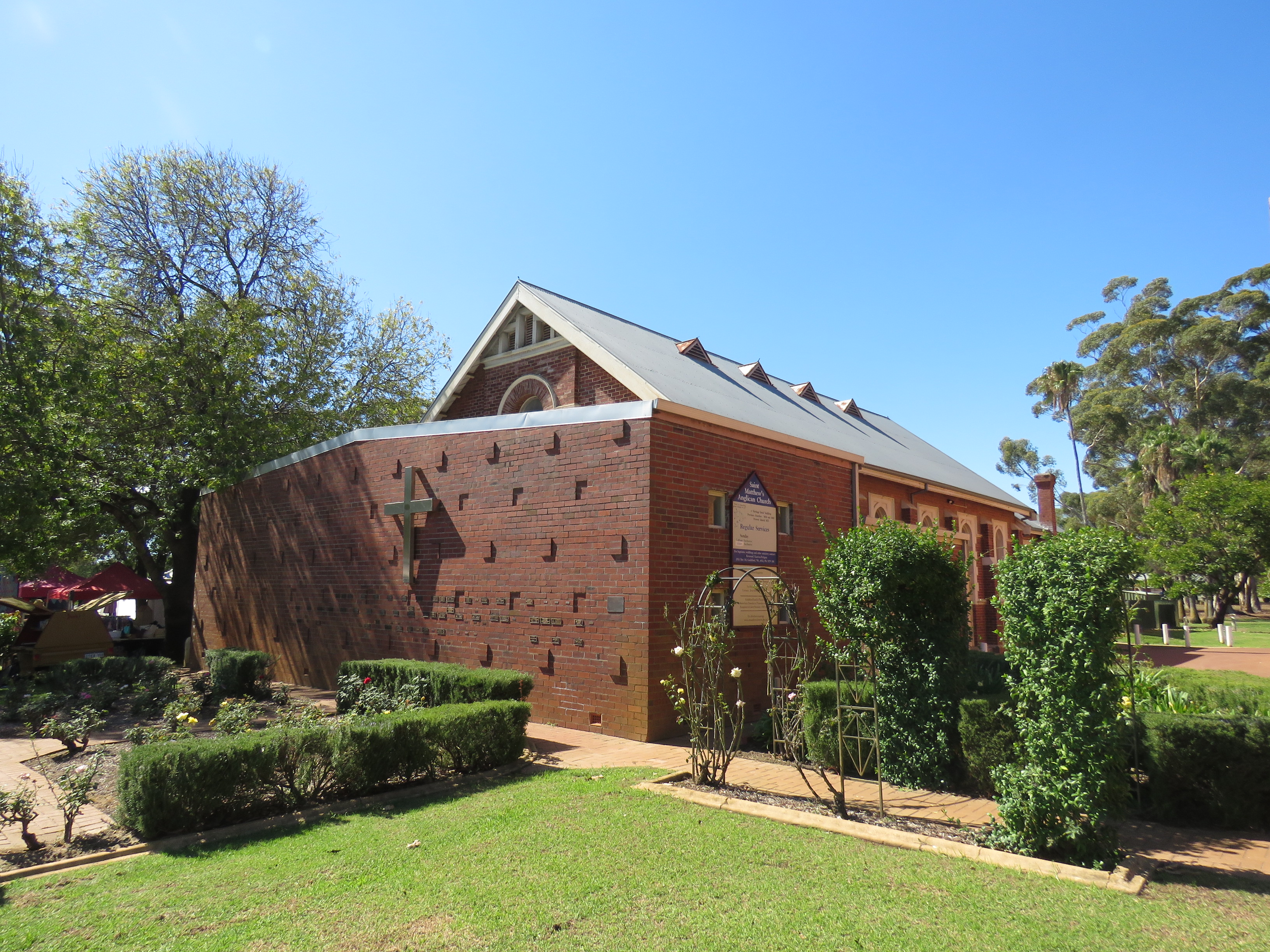
The St Matthew's Church Parish Hall

The second St Matthew's was built on the present site in Stirling Square and was consecrated by Bishop Hale on 21 September 1860.

That brick building with a roof of shingles was destroyed in a hurricane on 12 March 1872 during a baptism. No-one was hurt but only the harmonium and a few books could be saved.

Parishioners immediately started a rebuilding programme and the present church of St Matthew was opened on 9 June 1873, and consecrated on 15 October 1873. A second-hand pipe organ was installed in 1875. This organ had been built for St. John's Church, Fremantle, but became redundant when they purchased a larger instrument.

A much larger pipe organ was installed in the church in 1911, replacing the earlier organ by R C Clifton. This new organ was built by the Adelaide builder J. E. Dodd. The organ has encountered many re-buildings over the years, but has been kept in remarkable condition. In 2004 the organ was fully rebuilt and now features a state of the art transmission system.
