= Ben Carlin =

Australian adventurer (1912–1981)

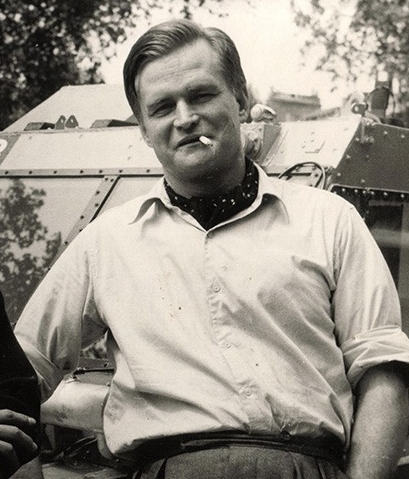
- Carlin in Montreal in 1948
- Born: Frederick Benjamin Carlin; 27 July 1912; Northam, Western Australia, Australia
- Died: 7 March 1981 (aged 68); Perth, Western Australia, Australia
- Education: Guildford Grammar School; Kalgoorlie School of Mines
- Occupations: Engineer, soldier
- Spouses: Gertrude Plath (m. 1940); Elinore Arone (m. 1946–55); Cynthia Henderson (m. 1963–64)
- Children: Deirdre Scott Carlin (b. 1964)

Frederick Benjamin Carlin (27 July 1912 – 7 March 1981) was an Australian adventurer who was the first person to circumnavigate the world in an amphibious vehicle. Born in Northam, Western Australia, Carlin attended Guildford Grammar School in Perth, and later studied mining engineering at the Kalgoorlie School of Mines. After qualifying as an engineer, he worked on the Goldfields before emigrating to China in 1939 to work in a British coal mine. In World War II, Carlin was posted to the Indian Army Corps of Engineers, serving in India, Italy, and throughout the Middle East. After his discharge from service in 1946, he emigrated to the United States with his American wife, Elinore (née Arone).

Sparked by an idea he had whilst in the military, Carlin proposed that the couple honeymoon by crossing the Atlantic Ocean in a modified Ford GPA (an amphibious version of the Ford GPW Jeep), which they named the Half-Safe. Beginning their trip in Montreal, Quebec, Canada, the Carlins finally completed the transatlantic crossing in 1951 after unsuccessful attempts. From there, they travelled to Europe, temporarily settling in Birmingham to raise more money. They resumed their journey in 1954, travelling overland through the Middle East before arriving in Calcutta. After a short fundraising trip to Australia, Carlin's wife left to return to the United States. He resumed the journey with new partners, travelling through South-East Asia and the Far East to the northern tip of Japan, and then to Alaska. After an extended tour through the United States and Canada, he and Half-Safe returned to Montreal, having travelled over 17,000 kilometres (11,000 mi) by sea and 62,000 kilometres (39,000 mi) by land during the ten-year journey. Following Carlin's death in 1981, Half-Safe was acquired by Guildford Grammar, his old school, where it remains on display.

== Early life and military service ==
Frederick Benjamin Carlin was born on 27 July 1912, in Northam, Western Australia, a town in the state's Wheatbelt. His mother, Charlotte Amelia Bramwell, died when he was four, and he was raised by his father, Frederick Cecil Carlin, who was an electrical engineer employed with the Western Australian Government Railways. At the age of ten, Carlin was sent to board at Guildford Grammar School in Perth. Leaving school in 1929, he enrolled at the School of Mines in Kalgoorlie, where he studied mining engineering. Once he had qualified as an engineer, he worked for a period of time in the surrounding Goldfields region. However, in 1939, he moved to Peking, China, to work for a British coal mining company.

Upon the outbreak of World War II, Carlin enlisted in the Indian Army. Before leaving for India, he married Gertrude Plath, a German citizen who had been living in China with her aunt and uncle. The couple wed on 20 April 1940, at Tientsin, although they separated before the end of the war. Having originally enlisted at Shanghai, Carlin was later posted to the Madras Sappers in the Indian Army Corps of Engineers. In August 1941, he was promoted to the position of second lieutenant, as part of a number of "emergency commissions" made at the start of the conflict. During the war, Carlin served in India, Iraq, Persia, Palestine, Syria, and Italy, and by the conflict's end had been promoted to the rank of major. Towards the end of the war, he met an American Red Cross nurse, Elinore Arone, who was originally from Boston. On his discharge from service in 1946, the couple moved to Maryland, where they married in June 1948.

== Circumnavigation ==
Map of Ben and Elinore Carlin's round-the-world trip. The journey, with the amphibious vehicle Half-Safe, began in 1950 and ended in 1958, having covered more than 17,000 km by sea and 62,000 km by land. Elinore Carlin accompanied her husband to Australia. The journey between India and Australia (dotted line) was made by boat.

=== Half-Safe and early preparation ===
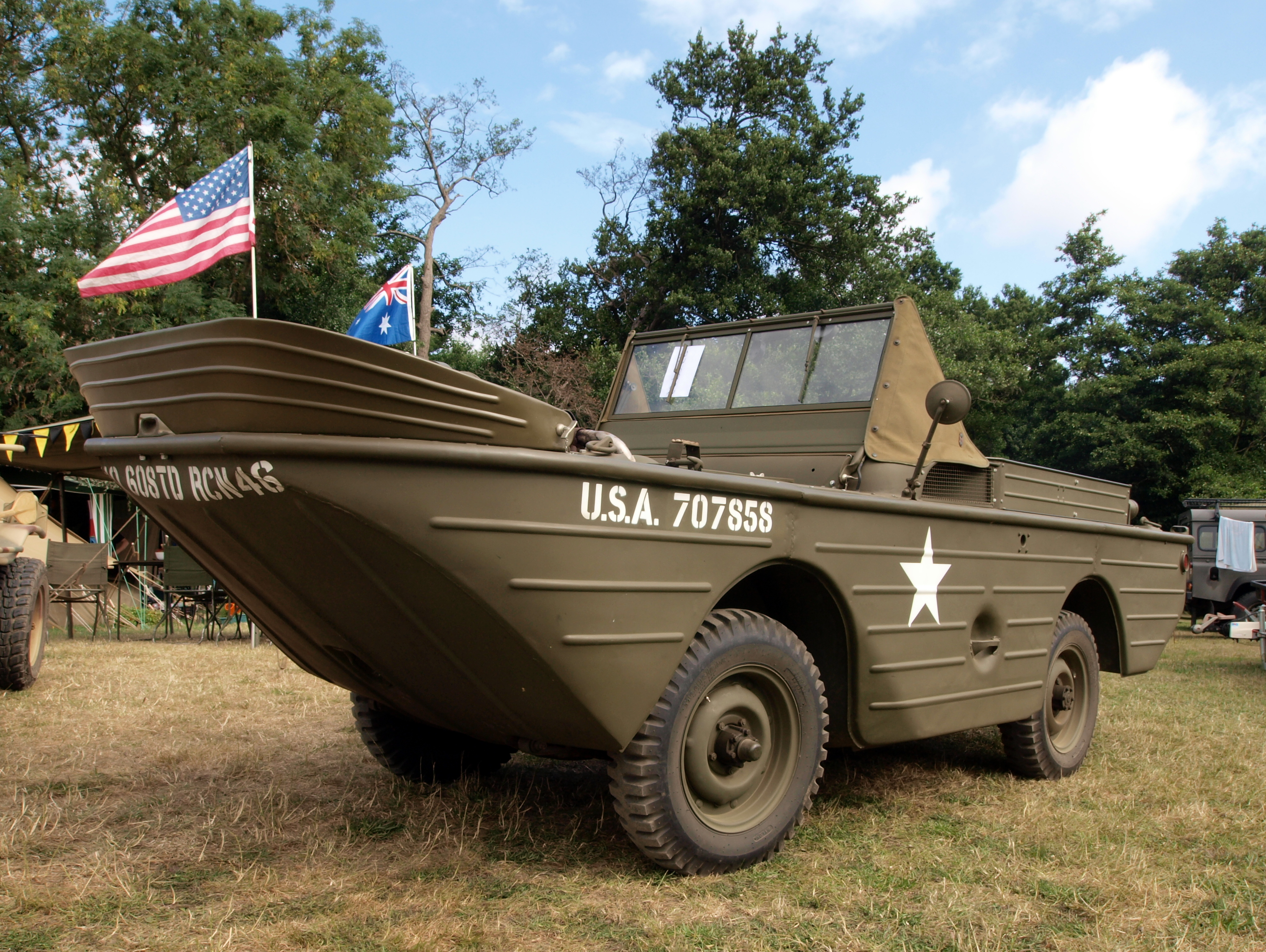
A standard Ford GPA

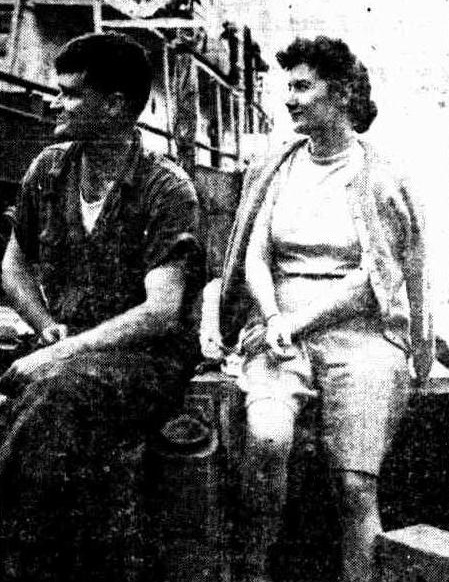
The Carlins during the early stages of preparation for their journey

Throughout the war, the Allies had made use of a number of different varieties of amphibious vehicle. One of the more commonly used was the Ford GPA, a modified version of the Ford GPW Jeep (also known as a "Seep"). In India, towards the end of the war, Carlin had noticed a GPA in an army vehicle lot. To the mockery of his fellow engineers, he suggested that the vehicle could be used to take him around the world, supposedly remarking: "with a bit of titivation, you could go around the world in one of those things". This idea remained with Carlin after his marriage, and he proposed to his wife that the couple honeymoon by crossing the Atlantic Ocean in a modified GPA. After a considerable amount of trouble, the Carlins managed to purchase a 1942 Ford GPA (serial number 1239) from a government auction in Washington, D.C., for US$901 (equivalent to $12,991 in 2025). The vehicle had originally been manufactured at Ford's plant in River Rouge, Michigan, one of 12,778 built during the war. He originally tried to convince Ford to sponsor his proposed trip, but the company refused, believing the craft would not make the journey. The vehicle required a number of modifications to make it seaworthy, including the addition of a more boat-like bow, a rudder, a larger cabin, and two extra fuel tanks – one at the bow and one under the "belly" of the craft, at the stern. Inside the cabin, a bunk was installed, and the dash was modified to include aircraft instruments, as well as a two-way radio (including a 19-set transmitter and receiver). In total, the vessel's length was extended by three feet to 18 feet (5.5 m), and the fuel capacity to 200 gallons (760 L) from the original 12 gallons (45 L). The construction of the under-belly fuel tank allowed it to be jettisoned when empty, reducing further its full weight of three long tons (6,720 lb or 3,048 kg). The vessel was christened Half-Safe, after the slogan of Arrid, a deodorant brand – "Don't be half-safe – use Arrid to be sure".

=== Failure of first attempts ===
The couple began testing their craft in 1947, and experienced problems with carbon monoxide removal, with the vessel's enclosed structure potentially increasing the risks of carbon monoxide poisoning. The Carlins chose Montreal as the official starting point of their circumnavigation attempt. They set out from the city in late 1947 for New York City, where they were to launch Half-Safe for the first time, with the intention of crossing the Atlantic via the Azores. A trial run was made in early January 1948, watched by "crowds of sceptical waterside workers". The couple's first attempt to complete the transatlantic crossing occurred on 16 June 1948, launching from New York Harbor. Cheered on by "100 amazed wharf labourers", they were first washed up-river by a strong tide, but then made their way out into the Atlantic at a speed of five knots. The Carlins failed to maintain radio contact, prompting a search by the United States Coast Guard. The craft was eventually landed five days after its departure, 40 miles (64 km) south of New York City near the Shark River Inlet in New Jersey. The couple had experienced problems with the steering gear and rudder, which made the vessel unable to steer at sea unless the wheel was constantly manned. With Half-Safe sailed back to New York, the Carlins commenced their journey for a second time on 3 July, but were once again forced back to shore a few days later, this time after nearly being asphyxiated due to a cracked exhaust pipe.

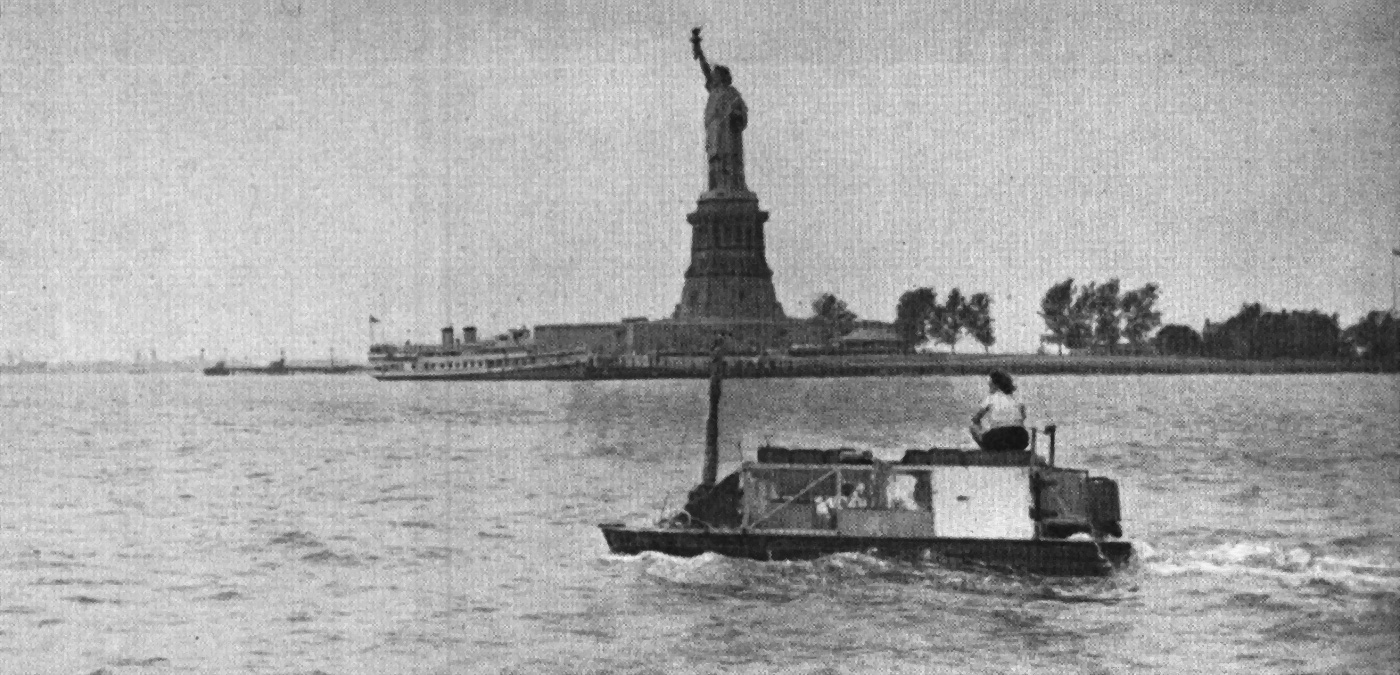
The Carlins sailed past the Statue of Liberty in New York Harbor on one of their first circumnavigation attempts in 1948.

A third attempt was made in late July, but was again not successful due to the mechanical troubles and heavy seasickness the Carlins experienced. The Carlins set out for a fourth time in early August, and progressed further, being sighted several days after their launch by an American destroyer almost 200 miles (320 km) off of New York. However, the couple soon lost radio contact, prompting Pan-American Airways to direct their crews to search for their craft. Half-Safe and the Carlins were rescued approximately 270 miles (430 km) off New York by the oil tanker New Jersey, bound for Halifax, Nova Scotia. Seven days into the voyage, a propeller bearing had welded itself fast due to lack of lubrication, leaving the vessel to drift aimlessly for a further ten days without means of steering it or navigating. According to a message Carlin radioed from the tanker to his friends in New York, the couple "drifted and fished", enjoying a "pleasant life, cheaper than Atlantic City". At the time of the couple's rescue, he considered abandoning the entire voyage, but was convinced to continue by the tanker's Norwegian captain, who greeted Carlin with the words: "Hell, you're not going to leave that god-damned Jeep lying around?!"

=== Transatlantic crossing ===
The Carlins' fourth failed attempt in two months led them to abandon the project for a period of time in order to raise more money. With the New Jersey arriving in Halifax two weeks after their rescue, Carlin took up a position with a local marine salvage firm, while his wife returned to her family in Boston, and worked in a law office. One final attempt was considered in November 1948, but was postponed due to the approaching winter weather, with Half-Safe stored in a Halifax garage. In mid 1949, the couple began to ready Half-Safe for a further attempt at the crossing. Testing in late August revealed a burnt-out clutch, which was repaired, and Carlin recognised the need for much larger amounts of fuel. To achieve this extra capacity, two fuel tanks were tied behind Half-Safe, painted bright yellow to aid visibility from the air. Further alterations were also made to the craft's superstructure, and extra stabilising rudders were added. The Carlins launched again in early September 1949. When the vessel was 35 miles (56 km) off shore, both of the auxiliary fuel tanks were lost, necessitating a return to Halifax. Carlin almost decided to abandon the journey and liquidate Half-Safe, but was convinced by his wife to continue.

When they struck a hurricane between the Azores and Madeira, and the superstructure looked like caving in, he got Elinore to recite the escape drill out loud in the tumult: "You shout 'OUT' – I get out and wait. You follow and grab the gear. I follow you – Keep In Contact!" They couldn't inflate and board the raft in that sea, and provided that the equipment wasn't wrenched from their grip they should be able to go on living, even though they carried no life jackets, for both were strong swimmers. He warned her: "Keep your face down and away from the spray – it hurts."

— The Buckingham Post, 27 January 1956

Over the following six months, the Carlins again made modifications to their vessel, with the most important being a large, purpose-built tank that was to be towed behind the craft. This increased the total fuel capacity of Half-Safe to 735 gallons (3,337 L), with the vessel also carrying 30 gallons (136 L) of water, eight gallons (36 L) of oil, and six weeks' worth of provisions. The couple left Halifax on 19 July 1950, and, after a 32-day voyage, arrived on Flores, the most westerly island of the Azores. Their landing was well-received, with LIFE featuring the crossing in a multiple-page article later that year, which also featured many of the Carlins' photographs. However, the journey had not occurred without mishap – Carlin was forced to remove the cylinder head several times in order to clean the carbon from the valves and replace the head gasket, and the couple lost radio contact halfway through the voyage, leading to fears they had been lost at sea. From Flores, the couple progressed to Horta on the island of Faial, a distance of 150 miles (240 km). They then travelled to Madeira, having obtained surplus fuel from a passing Portuguese cruiser midway through the trip. Although originally expected to head directly to Lisbon from Madeira, the couple instead chose to head for Morocco via the Canary Islands, coming ashore at Cap Juby in the Spanish territory of Rio de Oro on 23 February 1951.

From Cap Juby, the Carlins drove north through the coastal regions of Morocco to Europe. The hot daytime temperatures, which reportedly reached 170 °F (77 °C) within the vehicle's cabin, necessitated that Half-Safe be driven exclusively at night. The vehicle reached Casablanca, French Morocco, on 16 March 1951, and the British territory of Gibraltar in mid April, after sailing across the Straits of Gibraltar. From there, the Carlins drove through a number of European countries, where they engaged in sight-seeing before sailing across the English Channel and concluding the first part of their journey in Birmingham, where they arrived on 1 January 1952.

=== Europe and the Middle East ===
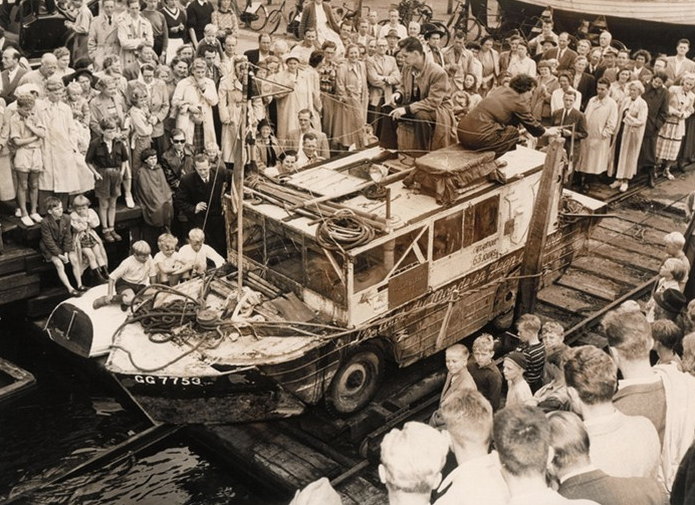
The Carlins and Half-Safe were greeted by a large crowd upon landing in Copenhagen in 1951.

Tired, weary, and lacking in money, the Carlins decided to remain in England to rest and recuperate. Throughout the journey from Nova Scotia to the Azores, both Carlin and his wife had suffered from severe hallucinations, including one instance where he had jerked awake to find himself 60° off course. Another important objective of their time in Britain was to repair Half-Safe, which had sustained large amounts of damage during the crossing, not least from Hurricane Charlie, which battered the vessel whilst it was amongst the islands of Macaronesia. The repairs to the craft were accomplished with the help of RAF Group Captain Malcolm Bunting, who had served alongside Carlin in India. To raise money for the continuation of the journey, Half-Safe was exhibited in department stores throughout Europe. During this time, Carlin also completed Half Safe: Across the Atlantic by Jeep, a book chronicling the first half of their journey, which sold 32,000 copies and was translated into five languages. The book was generally well received, with a reviewer in The Montreal Gazette describing Carlin as "an adventurer of the old school – full of the explorer's instinct, and with a dry wit that makes his story an odd mixture of high-adventure and real understatement".

The Carlins set out again in early 1955, arriving in France on 22 April 1955. The vehicle continued through Switzerland, northern Italy, and Yugoslavia, where in May 1955, it was reported that Half-Safe had had its first flat tire, whilst travelling through Belgrade. The Carlins then continued through Greece and Turkey, sailing across the Bosphorus to Asia Minor, before progressing through Syria, Jordan, Iraq, Iran, and Pakistan to Calcutta, India. Carlin later noted: "the 2000 miles across the Atlantic from Nova Scotia to the Azores were in many ways much less worrying than a similar distance covered on murderous roads in Persia". At Calcutta, the Carlins decided to transport Half-Safe to Australia via steamer. At the start of his voyage, Carlin had said he would not travel to Australia or New Zealand, because petrol was "too dear" there. However, a lack of funding meant the side trip was necessary. The trip also allowed Carlin to meet with his family, who still lived in Perth – his brother, Tom Carlin, had become a captain in the Royal Australian Navy, and was actively involved in nuclear weapons testing on the Montebello Islands in 1952, as part of Operation Hurricane.

=== Far East and return to North America ===
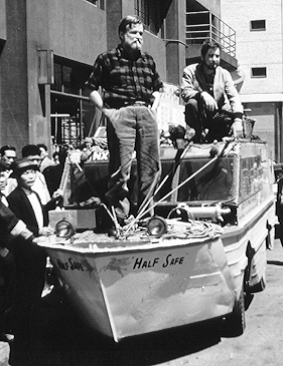
Carlin and his new travelling partner, Boyé de Mente, departed from Tokyo in May 1957.

Half-Safe's Australian tour began in late October 1955 in Perth, where Carlin grew up, and included a tour of his old school, Guildford Grammar. The Carlins then went to Adelaide, and subsequently progressed to Melbourne, Sydney, and Brisbane. Half-Safe was returned to Calcutta on a steamship in January 1956; however, Elinore, Carlin's wife, left the trip in Australia, having tired of the long travel and the constant seasickness she was experiencing. Carlin continued his journey alone, with the first leg consisting of a sea voyage from Calcutta to Akyab, Burma, across the Bay of Bengal. At Akyab, he was joined by Barry Hanley, another Australian. The two met on Burma's coast in late February 1956, and from there crossed the Arakan Yoma mountain ranges to the Irrawaddy River, where the vehicle was bogged down in mud for two days. After extricating Half-Safe from the mire, the pair progressed to Rangoon, arriving on 11 March. From Burma, Half-Safe was driven overland to Bangkok, Thailand, and from there to Saigon, on the coast of Indochina. From there, Carlin and Hanley set out to sail from Indochina to Japan, passing through several ports and islands in the South China Sea. Upon his arrival in Hong Kong in early May 1956, Carlin was "mobbed by autograph-seeking girls", having been delayed on his voyage by engine trouble and headwinds in the South China Sea.

He arrived in Kaohsiung, Taiwan, in early June, and from there travelled to Keelung on the northern tip of Taiwan, and Okinawa, part of the American-administered Ryukyu Islands. Carlin and Hanley drove ashore at Kagoshima Prefecture at the southern tip of Japan in July 1956, and from there drove overland to Tokyo. Hanley returned to Australia at this stage, while Carlin rested in Japan, again performing much-needed repairs. An American journalist for The Japan Times, Boyé Lafayette de Mente, offered to accompany Carlin on the journey from Japan to Alaska, departing in early 1957 for the first stage of the trip from Tokyo to Wakkanai, Hokkaidō. The pair left Tokyo on 1 May 1957 to great fanfare, cheered off from the Mainichi and Yomiuri Newspaper buildings. The craft sprang a leak while crossing the Tsugaru Strait, separating the southern island of Honshu from Hokkaidō, and collided with submerged rocks near the port of Muroran. They reached Wakkanai on 12 June 1957, despite what de Mente later described as Carlin's aggression and "irascible character" during the trip.

Carlin's aim was to travel directly from Wakkanai to Shemya, a small island in the Near Islands group of the Semichi Islands chain, part of the Aleutian Islands running southwest of the Alaskan mainland. The craft was carrying enough fuel to last for approximately 21 days, but did not make contact within this time, causing the US Coast Guard's search and rescue station to be notified. Half-Safe landed on Shemya on 8 July, with the pair having made an unexpected detour to visit the town of Petropavlovsk on the Kamchatka Peninsula, at the time part of the Russian SFSR. From Shemya, Carlin and de Mente sailed to Adak Island, a distance of 350 miles (560 km), then a further 580 miles (930 km) to Cold Bay, and thence along the Aleutian island chain to the mainland town of Homer, arriving in late August. Carlin and de Mente then drove Half-Safe overland to Anchorage, where de Mente flew home to Phoenix. He would go on to write Once a Fool: From Tokyo to Alaska by Amphibious Jeep, a detailed account of his experiences with Carlin and Half-Safe, as well as becoming a prolific author on topics relating to Mesoamerica and East Asia, publishing over 100 books. Carlin subsequently drove solo to Seattle, arriving in early November 1957. Whilst travelling the Alaska Highway in British Columbia, he encountered the collapsed Peace River Suspension Bridge. While other motorists queued for a nearby ferry, Carlin simply drove Half-Safe into the river and across to the other side. Continuing on to San Francisco, where he met his wife for the first time in two years, Carlin then continued onwards through the United States and north to Canada. He arrived in Toronto, on 10 May 1958, and three days later arrived in Montreal, completing his ten-year journey. He and Half-Safe had travelled 17,780 kilometres (11,050 mi) by sea and 62,744 kilometres (38,987 mi) by land over ten years, passing through 38 countries and over two oceans, with the entire trip costing him around $35,000.

== Later life and legacy ==
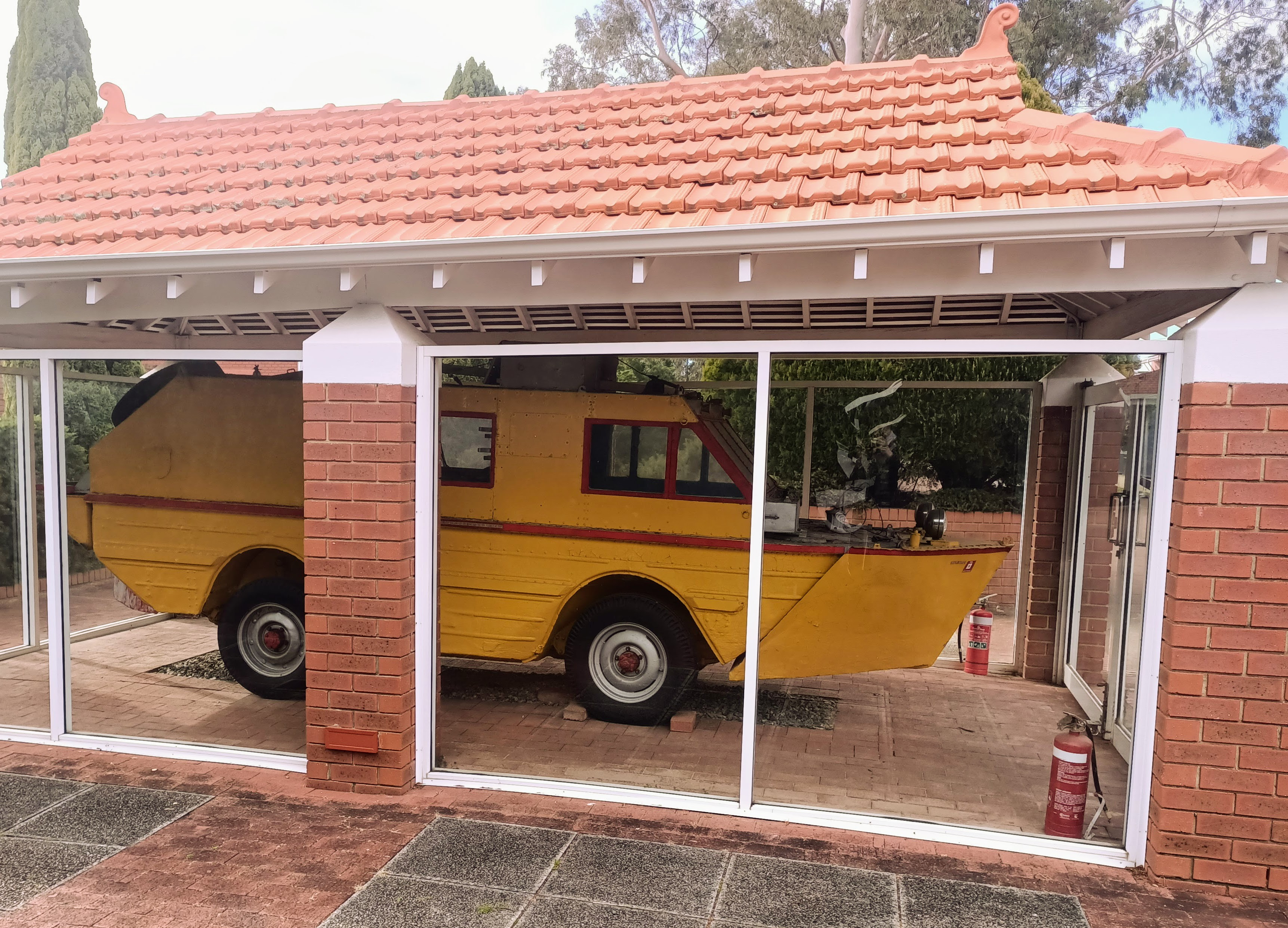
Half-Safe on display at Guildford Grammar School in August 2020.

After the conclusion of the trip, Half-Safe remained in the United States, where it was occasionally exhibited by Carlin's friend George Calimer, who was a co-owner of the vehicle. Carlin remained in the country for a period, appearing on the lecture circuit, before returning to Perth, where he took up residence in Cottesloe. Having divorced his second wife Elinore by December 1955, Carlin wed for a third time on 1 June 1963 in the United States, marrying Cynthia Henderson. Although the couple's marriage was short-lived, the union produced one daughter, Deirdre Scott Carlin, who was born in March 1964. Carlin died in Perth in March 1981, of a heart attack, and was cremated at Karrakatta Cemetery. His second wife, Elinore, who completed the first half of his journey alongside him, died in 1996 in New York City. Carlin left his share in Half-Safe to his old school, Guildford Grammar, as well as a sizeable endowment for the purposes of funding a scholarship. He had previously offered the craft to the Western Australian Maritime Museum, which declined the offer due to a lack of exhibition space. The Guildford Grammar School Foundation subsequently purchased the other share in the vehicle, transferring it to the school's campus in Guildford, Western Australia. The school also posthumously published The Other Half of Half-Safe, which detailed the second portion of Carlin's journey. In 1999, the craft was transported by truck across Australia to Corowa, New South Wales, where it featured in an annual celebration on the Murray River, along with 16 other amphibious vehicles from the Second World War. Half-Safe is currently exhibited in a specially-made glass enclosure at Guildford Grammar's main campus. Money from Carlin's estate was used to found the Charlotte Carlin Scholarship (named for his mother), awarded for "the proficiency of the English language with the avoidance of clichés". Guinness World Records recognises Carlin as having completed the "first and only circumnavigation by an amphibious vehicle".
