= Guildford Grammar School Chapel =

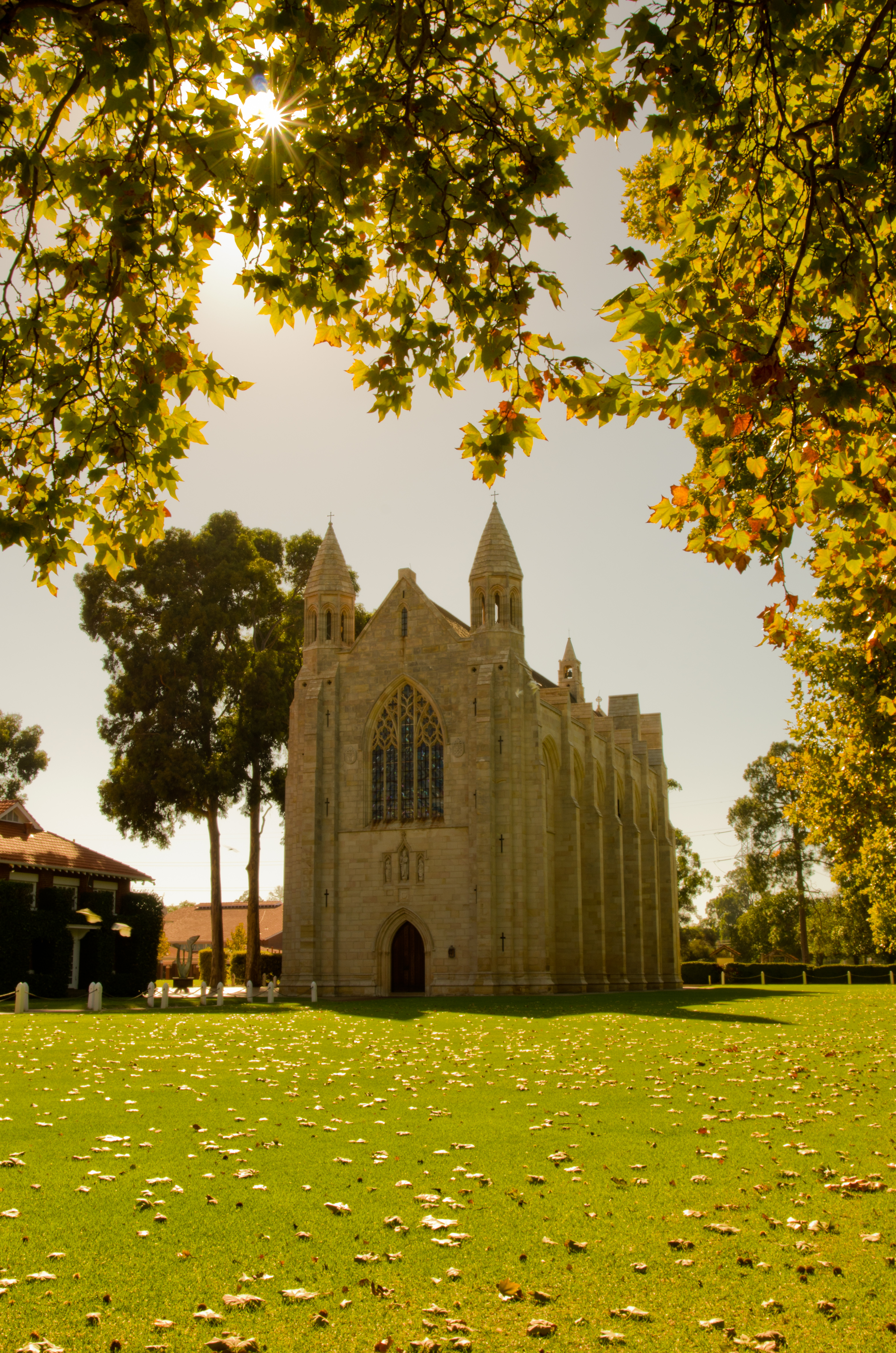
- Guildford Grammar School Chapel
- Interactive map of the Guildford Grammar School Chapel area

General information
- Type: Chapel
- Location: East Guildford, Western Australia
- Coordinates: 31.8948°S 115.9811°E

Western Australia Heritage Register
- Type: State Registered Place
- Designated: 7 April 1998
- Reference no.: 2487

The Guildford Grammar School Chapel usually known as the Chapel of St. Mary and St. George is a Heritage-listed building situated on Terrace Road, East Guildford and is used and owned by Guildford Grammar School (GGS).

== History ==
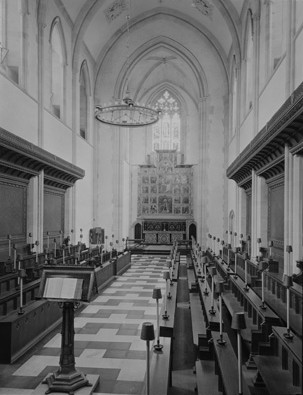
The chapel c. 1930s

The Chapel of St. Mary and St. George was built during the headmastership of Canon Percy Umphreyville Henn, who sought funds for its construction immediately after his appointment in 1909.

He found a generous benefactor in Englishman Cecil Oliverson who paid for the full cost of the building. It was consecrated in 1914. It was constructed from Donnybrook stone with interior woodwork of English Oak. He also donated the large gold-leaf rerados above the altar.

During the second World War Guildford Grammar School was commandeered by the United States Navy for use as a hospital. During their three months' occupation the students were evacuated to Fairbridge, near Pinjarra. The Navy painted two red crosses on the Chapel roof, one on each side of the slope. When the school population resumed residence in 1943 the Australian Army offered to replace the painted tiles but school authorities decided that it would be better to paint over the crosses with tile-coloured paint. Today that paint has almost worn off so once again the crosses are visible as a sign of GGS's contribution to the war.

The 1968 Meckering earthquake damaged the central bell tower on the roof – and other damage occurred at that time as well. A bible, gifted to the school by King George V of the United Kingdom, was destroyed in a fire in the sacristy fire in 1980. Queen Elizabeth II provided a replacement.

== Services ==
During the school's academic year the chapel is in daily use for services and congregational singing practices for the students. Boarders and some members of the school community attend the Sunday services. Marriages are celebrated almost every week while Baptisms, Introductions to Holy Communion and Confirmations are held fairly frequently. Funerals occur rarely. Special services are arranged to celebrate such events as Palm Sunday, Easter and Christmas.

== Architectural value ==
Guildford Grammar School's Chapel is one of the three latest Revival styles in Australia - the Gothic Perpendicular Revival. It was designed in 1912 by English architect Sir Walter Tapper. Many skilled tradesmen helped in the completion of the building, including some who were employed from the United Kingdom.

The chapel has attracted significant numbers of photographers since its construction - due to its unique construction. The result is that the National Library of Australia, and the Battye Library in Western Australia have significant collections of photographs of the chapel.
