= Boyé Lafayette De Mente =

American journalist and writer (1928–2017)

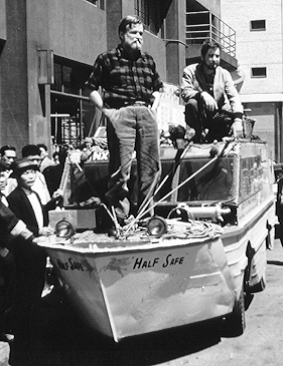
De Mente with Ben Carlin during their crossing of the Pacific Ocean by amphibious vehicle in the late 1950s.

Boyé Lafayette De Mente (November 12, 1928 – May 12, 2017) was an American author, journalist, and adventurer who wrote more than 100 books mainly related to the culture of Japan and the Japanese language. He also wrote widely of East Asia as well as Mexico.

== Early life and education ==
De Mente was born November 12, 1928, in Mayberry, Reynolds County, Missouri. He attended and graduated from McKinley High School in St. Louis, Missouri.

== Career ==
From 1946 to 1948, he served in the U.S. Navy as a cryptographer based in Washington, D.C. After that, he joined the U.S. Army Security Agency (1948–1952) and was sent to Tokyo to work as a decoding technician. During his tenure with the agency, he founded and edited The ASA Star, an agency newspaper.

During the 1950s, De Mente served in a variety of editorial positions with publications based in Tokyo, including Preview Magazine, Far East Traveler, and The Japan Times. In 1987, he became Associate Publisher of the Tokyo Journal, Japan's oldest English magazine sold globally. Together with editor Glenn Davis, they made Tokyo Journal the first publication in Japan to produce a magazine on a computer from scratch using Apple Macintosh computers. He later returned as a regular contributor to the Tokyo Journal, which continues to print articles he left to the magazine in tribute to him. He also acted as an extra in a number of Japanese films in the early 1950s. In 1957, he accompanied the Australian adventurer Ben Carlin on the Tokyo–Anchorage leg of his circumnavigation of the world, together with Carlin becoming the first to cross the Pacific Ocean via an amphibious vehicle. De Mente subsequently graduated from Jochi University in Tokyo, and The American Institute for Foreign Trade (now Thunderbird School of Global Management) in Glendale, Arizona.

== Death ==
Boyé Lafayette De Mente died May 12, 2017, in Paradise Valley, Arizona. He was 88.

== Published works ==
- Behind the Japanese Bow; Passport Books; First edition 1993. ISBN 0-8442-8491-2.
- The Japanese Have a Word for It: The Complete Guide to Japanese Thought and Culture, ISBN 0844283169.
- Etiquette Guide to Japan: Know the Rules...that Make the Difference, ISBN 0-8048-3417-2.
- Women of the Orient: Intimate Profiles of the World's Most Feminine Women (Rutland, Vermont and Tokyo: Charles E. Tuttle Co., 1992).
- Some Prefer Geisha: The Lively Art of Mistress-Keeping in Japan (Tokyo: The Wayward Press, 1966).
- The Chinese Have a Word for It : The Complete Guide to Chinese Thought and Culture, ISBN 0-658-01078-6.
- Samurai Strategies: 42 Martial Secrets from Musashi's Book of Five Rings, 2005, Tuttle Publishing, ISBN 0804836833.
- There's a Word for It in Mexico (Lincolnwood, Illinois: NTC Publishing Group, 1996), ISBN 0-8442-7251-5
- Japan's Cultural Code Words: 233 Key Terms That Explain the Attitudes and Behavior of the Japanese, 2004, Tuttle Publishing, ISBN 0-8048-3574-8.
- The Japanese Samurai Code: Classic Strategies For Success, 2005, Tuttle Publishing, ISBN 0-8048-3652-3.
- Japan Made Easy (New York: McGraw-Hill, 1996) ISBN 0-8442-8528-5.
- Kata: The Key To Understanding & Dealing with The Japanese!, 2003, Tuttle Publishing, ISBN 9780804833868.
- Instant Japanese: How To Express 1,000 Different Ideas With Just 100 Key Words and Phrases!, 2003, Tuttle Publishing, ISBN 0804833664.
- Sex and the Japanese: The Sensual Side of Japan (Rutland, Vermont and Tokyo: Tuttle Publishing, 2006) ISBN 0-8048-3826-7.
- Etiquette Guide to Korea (North Claredon, Vermont: Tuttle Publishing, 2008), ISBN 0-8048-3948-4.
- Eros' Revenge: The Brave New World of American Sex, Phoenix Books, 1979, ISBN 0-914778-21-8.
- Saburo: The Saga of a Teenage Samurai in 17th Century Japan, 2008, Phoenix Books.
- America's Famous Hopi Indians: Their Spiritual Way of Life & Incredible Prophecies, Phoenix Books, 2010, ISBN 1-4528-8629-6.
- Arizona's Lords of the Land! The Culture, History & Wisdom of the Navajo Indians, Phoenix Books, 2010, ISBN 1-4528-8273-8.
- Visitors' Guide to Arizona's Indian Reservations, Phoenix Books, 2010, ISBN 0-914778-14-5.
- The Grand Canyon Answer Book! Everything You Might Want to Know and Then Some!, Phoenix Books, 2009, ISBN 0-914778-09-9.
- Amazing Arizona!: Fascinating Facts, Legends & Tall Tales! (Phoenix, Arizona: Phoenix Books/Publishers, 2010), ISBN 0-914778-71-4.
- Which Side of Your Brain Am I Talking To? The Advantages of Using Both Sides of Your Brain, Phoenix Books, 2009, ISBN 0-914778-95-1.
- Why the Japanese Are a Superior People!, Phoenix Books, 2009, ISBN 0-914778-55-2.
- Mistress-Keeping in Japan!: The Pitfalls & the Pleasures (Phoenix, Arizona: Phoenix Books/Publishers, 2009), ISBN 0-914778-72-2.
- Samurai Principles & Practices That Will Help Preteens & Teens in School, Sports, Social Activities & Choosing Careers, Phoenix Books, 2009, ISBN 0-914778-99-4.
- Amazing Japan! Why Japan Is One of the World's Most Intriguing Countries! (Phoenix, Arizona: Phoenix Books, 2009), ISBN 0-914778-29-3.
- Exotic Japan!: The Sensual & Visual Pleasures (Phoenix, Arizona: Phoenix Books, 2009), ISBN 0-914778-83-8.
- The Origins of Human Violence! Male Dominance, Ignorance, Religions & Willful Stupidity!, Phoenix Books, 2010, ISBN 1-4528-5846-2.
- Bridging Cultural Barriers in China, Japan, Korea and Mexico, Phoenix Books, 2009, ISBN 0-914778-02-1.
- The Bizarre & the Wondrous from the Land of the Rising Sun!, Phoenix Books, 2010, ISBN 978-1-4564-2475-6.
- The Mexican Mind! Understanding & Appreciating Mexican Culture!, Phoenix Books, 2011, ISBN 978-1-4680-3329-8.
- Japan: Understanding & Dealing With the New Japanese Way of Doing Business!, Phoenix Books, 2012, ISBN 1-4699-8616-7.
- Why Ignorance, Stupidity and Violence Plague Mankind!, Phoenix Books, 2010, ISBN 0-914778-74-9.
- Why Oriental Girls Attract Western Men! The Erotic Side of the Orient!, Phoenix Books, 2009, ISBN 0-914778-85-4.
- Once a Fool! From Japan to Alaska by Amphibious Jeep!, Phoenix Books, 2009, ISBN 978-0-914778-04-2.
- China: Understanding & Dealing with the Chinese Way of Doing Business!, Phoenix Books, 2012, ISBN 978-1470125837.
- The Incredible Power of Serendipity: Highlights of an Uncommon Life! A Very Personal Memoir, Phoenix Books, 2012, ISBN 978-1477468357.
- Japan: A New Way of Getting the Most Out of a Japan Experience!, Phoenix Books, 2012, ISBN 978-1480266667.
