= Garrick Theatre (Guildford) =

Heritage-listed theatre in Guildford, Western Australia

Coordinates: 31°53′59″S 115°58′19″E

- Former Commissariat Store & Quarters; Infant Health Centre
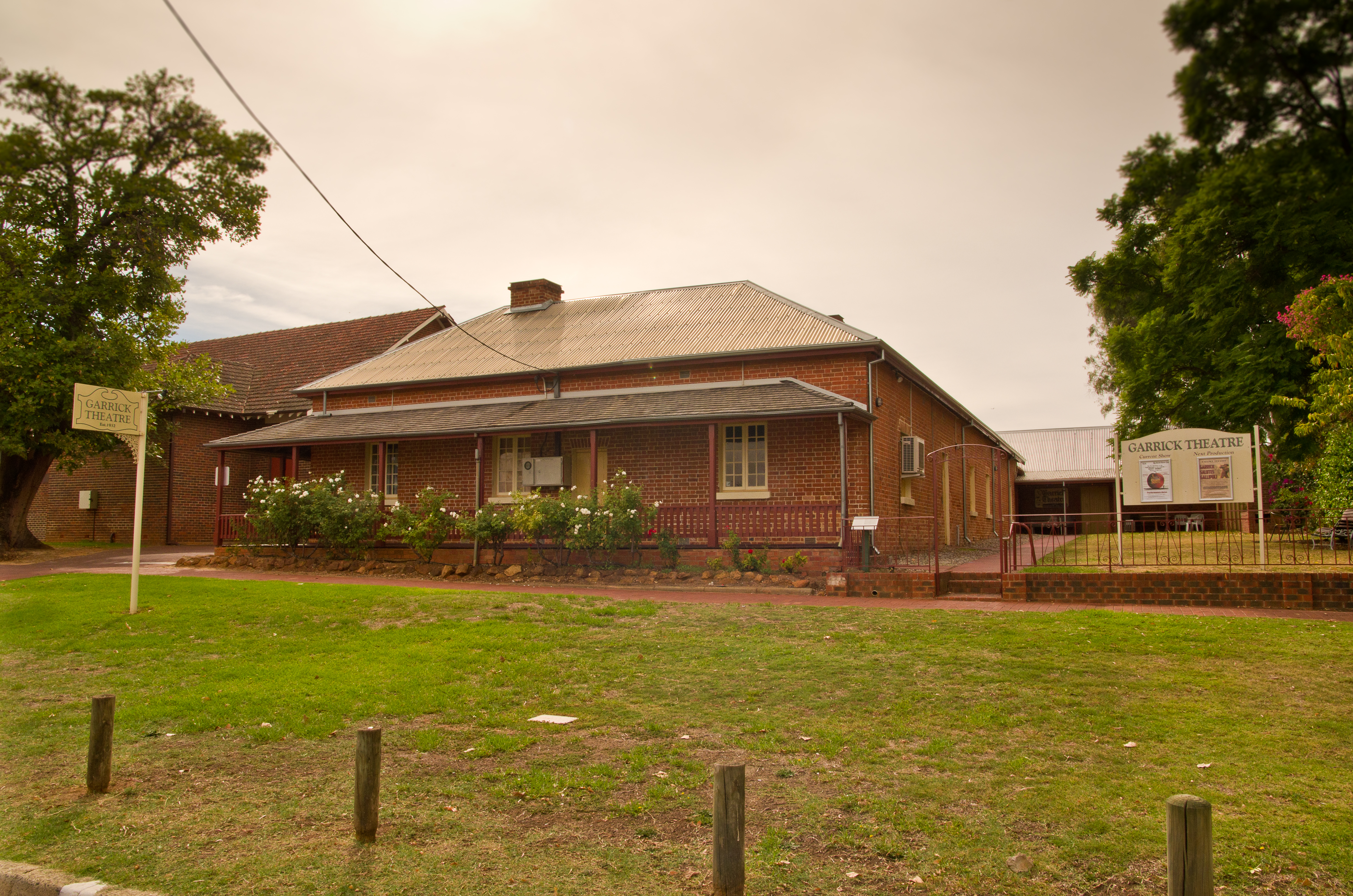
- Meadow street view
- Interactive map of Garrick Theatre
- Address: 16 Meadow Street; Guildford, Western Australia
- Current use: Amateur theatre

Construction
- Opened: 13 May 1932 (original intended use dates to 1853)
- Years active: 76
- Architect: John Pidgeon

Website
- www.garricktheatre.asn.au

Western Australia Heritage Register
- Type: State Registered Place
- Designated: 7 October 1997
- Reference no.: 2469

The Garrick Theatre is the longest continually running amateur theatre group in metropolitan Western Australia, located at 16 Meadow Street in Guildford, Western Australia. The original structure was built in 1853 and is considered to be one of the few intact parts of a convict depot demonstrating the way of life in the convict era of Western Australia – its current use as a theatre was preceded by use as commissariat store and quarters and later as an infant health centre.

== Historical use ==
The former Commissariat Store and Quarters was among those buildings designed and constructed as part of the Guildford Convict Depot by Lieutenant Edmund Frederick Du Cane.

Lieutenant Du Cane designed and supervised the construction of most of the buildings associated with the convict depot in Guildford, as well as building the first bridge over the Swan River at Guildford, at the site of the public wharf in Meadow Street. Of these works, only the Commissariat building, the Pensioner's Cottage, West Guildford, and his own house, immediately to the south of the Commissariat Store, remain.

The Commissariat Quarters were intended as a dwelling for the officers in charge of the Commissariat Store. According to Lieutenant Du Cane's reports, the Commissariat Quarters were completed at the end of 1853, and the Commissariat Store was completed in 1854. Du Cane describes both buildings in one of his reports:

A commissariat store has been erected 55' x 25'; to it are attached a quarter consisting of two rooms and a kitchen, and an office. This building is of brick with wooden floors, the quarters and office only are ceiled. It is surrounded by a fence enclosing a yard about 130' x 145' in which also has been erected a wooden stable; this has been built with one side open as being best suited to the climate, and the work required of the horses; there is accommodation for 7 horses, a loose box for a sick horse, a harness room, a room for the groom, and a shed capable of containing 4 carts and 30 tons of hay.

When Lieutenant Du Cane was transferred to Fremantle in 1855, his former house was handed over to the director of the Commissariat Store in Guildford, Deputy Assistant Commissary-General Travers. The Commissariat Store was later used as a Drill Hall by Enrolled Pensioner Guards. When the convict depot in Guildford was closed in 1878, the buildings were handed over to the municipality of Guildford, which sold Du Cane's house, and the section of Allotment 45 on which it stands, to a private buyer.

The Commissariat Quarters were renovated in 1951 for use as an Infant Health Centre.

== Modern-day use ==
The Garrick Theatre Club has operated out of the premises since 1932 and in 2007 celebrated 75 years as a theatre club. The Garrick Theatre Club is the oldest and continual running community theatre group in metropolitan Western Australia. The Garrick was named after David Garrick, considered the most influential Shakespearean actor.

== General references ==
- Battye Library, Accession No. 353A.
- The Heritage Council of WA Registrar of Places
