= Con Michael =

Australian cricketer

Personal information
- Full name: Constantine Anthony Michael
- Born: 12 January 1953 (age 73); Victoria Park, Western Australia
- Batting: Left-handed
- Bowling: Left-arm fast-medium
- Role: Bowler

Domestic team information
- Years: Team
- 1979/80: Western Australia

Career statistics
Competition	First-class
Matches	3
Runs scored	1
Batting average	–
100s/50s	0/0
Top score	1*
Balls bowled	414
Wickets	9
Bowling average	26.77
5 wickets in innings	0
10 wickets in match	0
Best bowling	3/75
Catches/stumpings	1/–
- Source: CricketArchive, 4 December 2012

Constantine Anthony Michael (born 12 January 1953) is a former Australian cricketer who played three first-class matches for Western Australia. Born in Victoria Park, a suburb of Perth, Western Australia, Michael attended Guildford Grammar School, and represented Western Australia at colts level. He made his first-class debut for Western Australia in a Sheffield Shield match against Victoria during the 1979–80 season. Filling the role of Dennis Lillee, who had been selected for the Australian national team in the Test series against the West Indies, Michael was the third fast bowler in the team, alongside Terry Alderman and Mick Malone, and took 1/14 and 2/20 on debut. He retained his place in the side for the following match against New South Wales, taking 2/39 and 0/54, but was not selected at Sheffield Shield level again.

Michael's third and final first-class match came against the touring West Indians in early January 1980, and recorded his best first-class haul opening the bowling with Alderman, dismissing the West Indies' first three batsman in the second innings (Lawrence Rowe, Desmond Haynes, and Larry Gomes) on the way to figures of 3/75. He was also twelfth man in a limited overs match between the two sides played shortly after the first match. At grade cricket level, Michael played for North Perth, and led the competition's bowling aggregates during the 1977–78 season, with 47 wickets.
