= Colin Ramm =

Australian physicist

Colin Arnold Ramm
- Born: 1921
- Died: 2014/06/28
- Citizenship: Australia

Colin Ramm (1921-2014) was an Australian particle physicist. Ramm worked at CERN on the detection of neutrinos, developing the 500-litre bubble chamber known as the Ramm Chamber, which was completed in 1960. He later served as the Dean of the Faculty of Science at the University of Melbourne. The Ramm Prize for Experimental Physics, offered at the University of Melbourne, is named in his honour.

== Early life ==
Colin Ramm was born in Perth, Western Australia, in 1921. After he had completed his early studies at Guildford Grammar School, he obtained an exhibition to the University of Melbourne, but he was unable to accept it. Instead, he decided to join the Commonwealth Meteorological Bureau, there he started to study part-time with a free place at the University of Western Australia. His passion had been chemistry, but later he concentrated on physics, and in 1942 he gained a first-class Honours degree. But during the war the Meteorological Bureau became part of the Royal Australian Air Force, because of this he was seconded to the University for optical munitions work. He was skilful at experimental techniques but instead he had to spend much time in the final polishing of lens plates. After the war he became interested in cosmic rays, klystrons and teaching, so he stayed at the university. In the year 1947 he got an invitation from. M.L.E (now Sir Marcus) Oliphant to be a lecturer at Birmingham University, where Europe's first proton synchrotron, it could give an energy of 1 GeV was being built.

== CERN ==
At about this time there was plans for the 28-GeV CERN proton synchrotron, Colin Ramm was very interested in the idea of an internationale collaboration to build a much faster accelerator. So he joined the PS Division in 1954 as the leader of the magnet group, which became responsible for the whole of the synchrotron's magnet system. When the work on the magnet finished the magnet group became the Nuclear Physics Apparatus Division in 1961. At this time they turned towards making the PS usable as an experimental device, and in the course of time a number of projects took shape: the heavy-liquid bubble chamber, enhanced neutrino beam, electrostatic separators. The bubble chamber has a volume of 500 litres, is still now to this day the largest heavy liquid chamber operating in a magnetic field at its time. Completed in 1960 it was used in CERN's first neutrino experiments. The electrostatic separators built by Colin’s division gave CERN some of the world’s highest-energy beams of separated particles, as well as leading to research into the basic principles of high-voltage breakdown.

== End life ==
Colin went back to Australia in 1972 where he was invited to become the first full-time Dean of the Faculty of Science at the University of Melbourne. After his retirement in 1983 he joined the School of Physics. And after nearly 30 years he returned to teaching. He retired in 1988, and died in 2014 at the Bupa Aged Care Caulfield Australia.
