= Stirling Square (Guildford) =

Public park in Guildford, Western Australia

Coordinates: 31°53′53″S 115°58′13″E

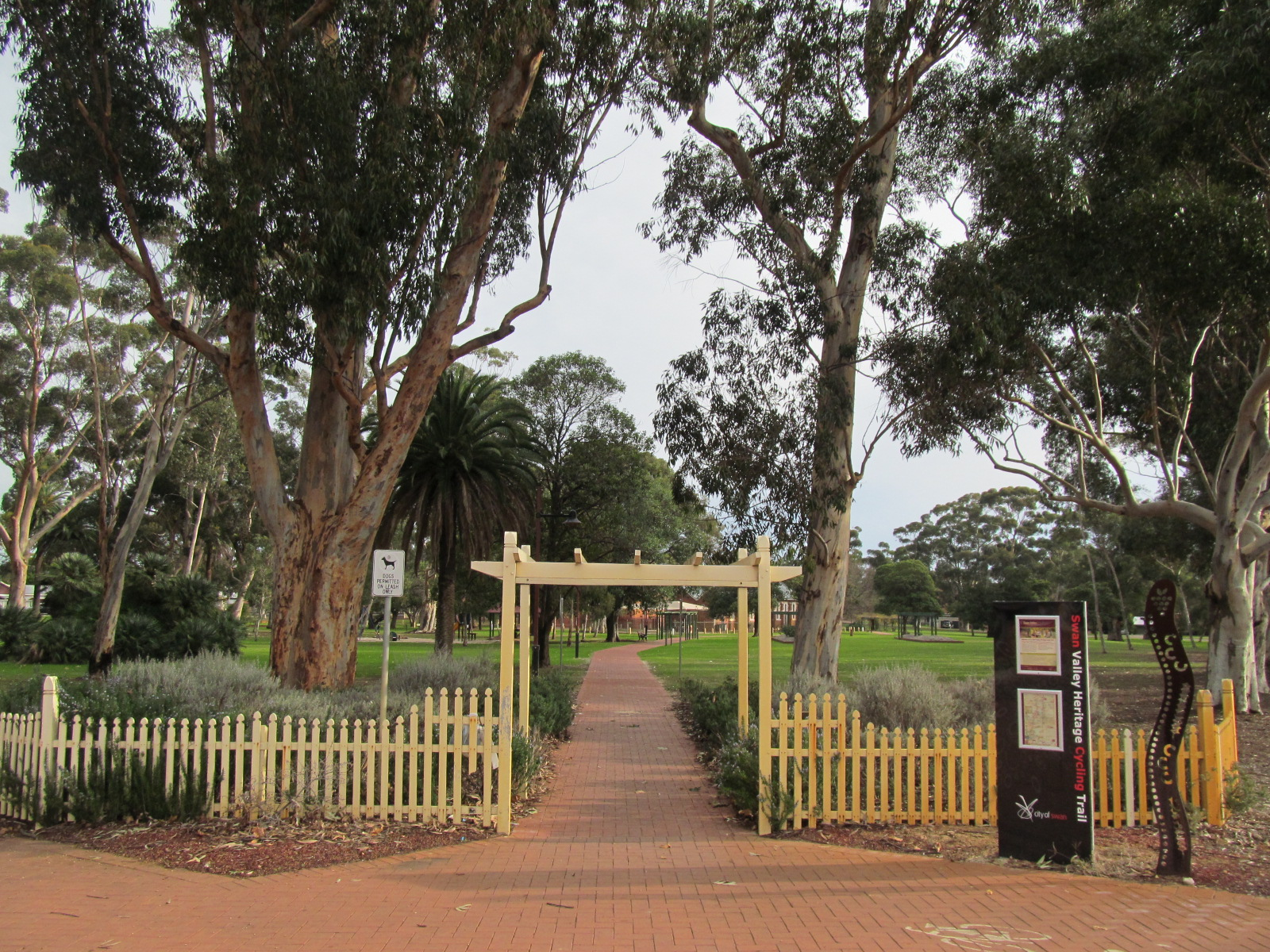
View of fence and entrance at Stirling Square (Guildford)

Stirling Square is a public park in Guildford, Western Australia.

It was established early in the development of Guildford and has as part of its western side, the historic St Matthew's Church, Guildford and at its south eastern corner, the Talbot Hobbs' Memorial Gates.

It has been assessed as a historic site, and has been evaluated for a range of conservation measures.
