= Donnybrook stone =

Sandstone found near Donnybrook, Western Australia

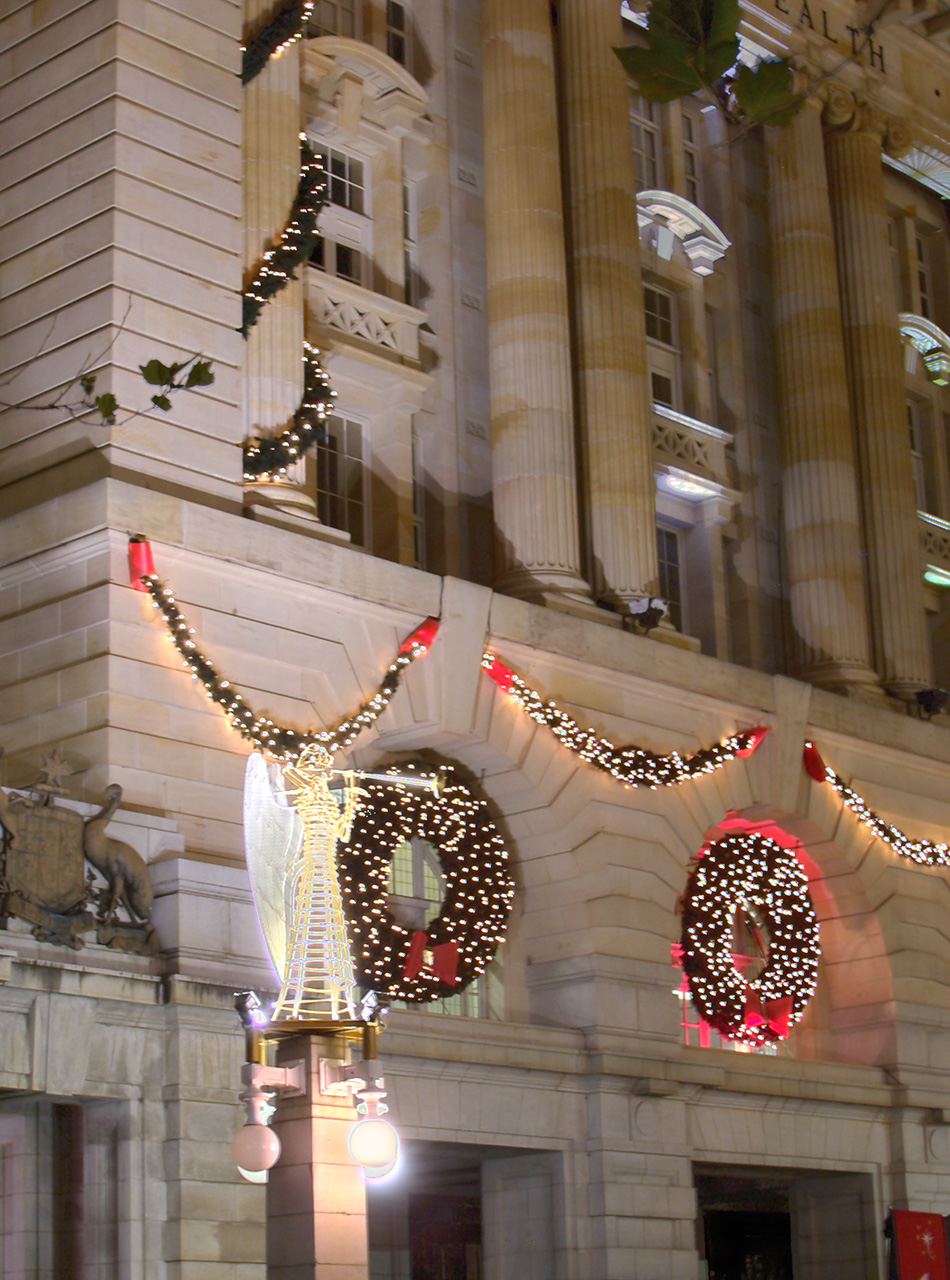
The General Post Office in Perth

Donnybrook stone is a fine to medium-grained feldspathic and kaolinitic sandstone found near the town of Donnybrook, Western Australia. It originates from the early Cretaceous (144-132 MYA) and features shale partings and colour variations which range from white to beige and pink.

Donnybrook stone is used as dimension stone in the building industry and is both a commercial name as well as a stratigraphic name.

Many public and private buildings in Western Australia feature Donnybrook stone. These include the facade and portico to the Parliament House building in West Perth, the General Post Office in Perth, the entry portal to the Fremantle Railway Station and the Police Courts building in Beaufort Street, Perth, the latter of which is constructed entirely of Donnybrook stone.

== History ==
Gold was found in Donnybrook in the mid-1890s and was being mined there in late 1898.

There was a royal commission held in the early twentieth century regarding its suitability for use in public buildings, including the soon to be constructed Parliament House.

There were up to eight quarries producing Donnybrook stone in and around the town in the 1930s. Most of these have since closed, however, in 1981 the Goldfields Quarry on the Upper Capel Road re-opened and now produces material for floor tiles and facing slabs. Several of the closed quarries are on the Donnybrook-Balingup Road.

== Usage ==
The following list is from a 1984 publication - some items might have since been renamed as structures, demolished or changed:

=== Perth ===
- GPO - Forrest Place - upper floors
- Commonwealth Bank Building, (CBC bank) - corner of Murray Street and Forrest Place upper floors
- Parliament House, Perth - Harvest Terrace frontage - Main entrance, column facings and building frontage. First floor - central portion
- Supreme Court of Western Australia - Riverside drive frontage - external walls of basement
- Police Courts - Beaufort Street - whole building
- Public Health Department - Murray Street - whole building
- State Library, James Street - arches to first floor and second floor balcony
- Museum Building, Beaufort Street - window arches and sills
- Government Stores, Murray Street - ground floor facing, window lintels and gable ends
- University of Western Australia - Winthrop Hall

=== Fremantle ===
- Railway Station
- Fremantle Customs House
- St John's Anglican church
- St Patricks Catholic church
- Scottish House

=== Guildford ===
- Guildford Grammar School Chapel

== See also ==
- Tamala Limestone
