= Jason Cyster =

Jason G. Cyster
- Born: Western Australia
- Education: University of Western Australia (BSc), University of Oxford (PhD)
- Known for: Chemokine signaling, lymphocyte migration, germinal center biology
- Awards: Pew Scholar in the Biomedical Sciences, Packard Fellowship, Beazley Award
- Scientific career
- Fields: Immunology
- Workplaces: University of California, San Francisco

Jason G. Cyster is an Australian-born American immunologist known for his work on lymphocyte migration, cell interaction dynamics in immunity, and the role of lipid mediators such as sphingosine-1-phosphate (S1P) in immune cell trafficking. He is currently a professor in the Department of Microbiology and Immunology at the University of California, San Francisco (UCSF) and an investigator with the Howard Hughes Medical Institute.

== Early life and education ==
Cyster was born and raised in rural Western Australia, where he spent much of his youth working on a farm. He attended boarding school in Perth for his final years of secondary education and was awarded the prestigious Beazley Award for achieving the highest aggregate score on Australia’s Tertiary Entrance Exams in his state.

He received his Bachelor of Science degree in Biochemistry and Microbiology from the University of Western Australia in 1988, where he developed an early interest in immunology. He then completed his PhD in Immunology at the University of Oxford in 1992 under the mentorship of Alan Williams (immunologist), focusing on the characterization of the CD43 molecule. He also collaborated with Paul C. Driscoll and Ian Campbell on structural analyses of the T cell antigen CD2.

== Career ==
Following his PhD, Cyster joined the laboratory of Christopher Goodnow at Stanford University as a postdoctoral fellow (1992–1995), where he studied immunological tolerance and the follicular exclusion process. In 1995, he joined the faculty at UCSF. He became an assistant professor in the Department of Microbiology and Immunology and later rose to the rank of full professor. From 2000 to 2003, he was also an assistant investigator of the Howard Hughes Medical Institute.

== Research ==
Cyster’s laboratory studies how immune cells navigate within lymphoid organs and barrier tissues to mount effective immune responses. His work combines genetic, molecular, and real-time imaging approaches to uncover mechanisms of:

- Cell migration and chemoattraction
- Germinal center formation and affinity maturation
- Egress of lymphocytes from lymphoid tissues
- Barrier immunity and IgA responses

He helped identify critical roles for chemokines and lipid mediators in orchestrating immune cell positioning. His lab demonstrated that S1P receptor 1 (S1PR1) is essential for lymphocyte egress from the thymus and lymphoid organs—a discovery that contributed to the development of the S1P receptor modulator Fingolimod (FTY720), later FDA-approved for treating multiple sclerosis.

Cyster’s work also contributed to the identification of CXCL16 as a transmembrane chemokine and ligand for the HIV-coreceptor Bonzo. He was among the first to show that fibroblastic reticular cells in lymph nodes regulate the homeostasis of naive T cells.

His studies on germinal centers have elucidated how B and T cells interact and undergo selection, providing insights relevant to vaccine design and autoimmunity. Ongoing work explores innate-like lymphocytes at epithelial surfaces and how chronic mucosal responses contribute to lymphomagenesis.

Cyster’s early work also showed that SLC (CCL21), a chemokine expressed in high endothelial venules, plays a role in naive T lymphocyte homing.

== Honors and awards ==
- 1984 – Beazley Medal (Western Australia)
- 1988 – J. A. Wood Memorial Prize, University of Western Australia
- 1989–1992 – Commonwealth Overseas Studentship
- 1992–1995 – Cancer Research Institute Postdoctoral Fellowship
- 1996–2000 – Pew Scholar in the Biomedical Sciences
- 1997 – Cheryl Whitlock Memorial Prize for Postdoctoral Studies
- 1998–2003 – David and Lucile Packard Fellowship
- 2010 - Cancer Research Institute Fredrick W. Alt Award
- 2011 - American Association for the Advancement of Science Fellow
- 2014 - Member of the National Academy of Sciences
- 2018 - Member of the American Academy of Arts and Sciences
- 2018 - AAI Biolegend Herzenberg Award
