= Malvina Evalyn Wood =

Australian librarian

Malvina Evalyn Wood (1893–1976), university librarian and college warden, was born in Guildford, Western Australia, daughter of a railway porter. Genealogy records show that the family's name was initially Shell, but was changed to Wood for unknown reasons.

== Personal life ==
An announcement of Wood's engagement to Sydney Harrison appeared in The Daily News on 18 May 1914, though her biography in the Australian Dictionary of Biography states that she never married but had a long-term relationship with a partner who died in 1947. Wood a resident of a nursing home in Mosman Park died on 17 September 1976 the bulk of her estate valued at A$250,000 was bequeathed to St Catherine College at University of Western Australia.

== Schooling ==
Wood received her Bachelor's (1927) and master's degree (1943) from the University of Western Australia. After completing a correspondence course, she became an Associate of the Library Association of the United Kingdom in 1933.

== Career ==
Wood started as a typist and Librarian at the Museum and Art Gallery of Western Australia in 1910, before becoming an administrative assistant to chief Librarian J.S. Battye in 1919. She was appointed as the first full-time librarian of the University of Western Australia in 1927.

Wood became an Honorary Fellow of St Catherine's College in 1970.
