= Guildford Grammar School =

School in Western Australia

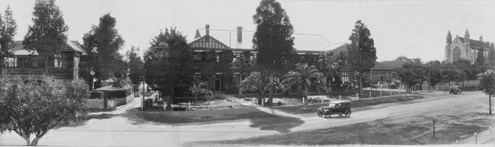
- Guildford Grammar School, Terrace Road, in 1932

Location
- 11 Terrace Road, Guildford, Perth, Western Australia; Australia; 31°53′44″S 115°58′48″E

Information
- Former name: The Church of England Grammar School

Western Australia Heritage Register
- Official name: Guildford Grammar School
- Type: State Registered Place
- Reference no.: 2470
- Type: Independent co-educational primary and secondary day and boarding school
- Motto: Go Forward
- Religious affiliation: Diocese of Perth
- Denomination: Anglicanism
- Established: 1896; 130 years ago
- Founder: Charles Harper
- Principal: Peter Allen
- Staff: ~237
- Years: K–12
- Enrolment: ~1,326 (2024)
- Area: 80 hectares (198 acres)
- Campus type: Suburban
- Colours: Navy blue and white
- Affiliations: Public Schools Association; Independent Primary School Heads of Australia; Junior School Heads Association of Australia; Headmasters' and Headmistresses' Conference
- Alumni: Old Guildfordians
- Website: www.ggs.wa.edu.au

Guildford Grammar School, informally known as Guildford Grammar, Guildford or GGS, is an independent Anglican coeducational primary and secondary day and boarding school, located in Guildford, a suburb of Perth, Western Australia.

Initially established as a single-sex school for boys, in 2019, the School became co-educational from Kindergarten to Year 6, and in Years 7, 8 and 11 in the Senior School; in Years 9-10 and 12, the School catered for boys only. Since 2019, the School has been fully co-educational. Boarding facilities for Senior School girls were introduced from 2020.

The school is a member of the Public Schools Association and the Independent Primary School Heads of Australia.

The Anglican grammar school traces its origins back to 1896 when it was established by Charles Harper. In 1900, the school moved from the Harper family home to its current site near the banks of the Swan River, approximately 15 km (9.3 mi) from the centre of the City of Perth on 80 hectares (198 acres) of property. The East Guildford campus consists of a senior school for Year 7 to 12, a preparatory school for kindergarten to Year 6, sporting grounds and boarding facilities for 150 students.

== History ==
Guildford Grammar School traces its foundations to 1896, when Charles Harper, an influential Western Australian, established in the billiard room of his house (Woodbridge House) a school (under the guidance of Frank Bennett, the first headmaster) which was to cater to the educational needs of his children and those from the surrounding district. Harper's vision was to create a school based on the English public school system, whilst also attempting to accommodate the different culture of the modern colonial society.

In 1900, the school moved to its current site. The school was originally called The Church of England Grammar School. Together with Christian Brothers College (Aquinas), The High School (Hale School) and The Alexander Scotch College (Scotch), the school established the Public Schools Association (PSA) in 1905. Initially, the school only had 14 students, but in 1910, with over 100 students, it was taken over by the Trustees of the Church of England. Canon Percy Henn was appointed Headmaster.

In 1914, the Chapel of St Mary and St George was consecrated and, to the east of the senior school, the preparatory school was founded by Henn and Cecil Priestley. It originally took boys only. It is now co-educational and also includes boarders. These boarders are accommodated in the Graham Malcolm Junior Hall of Residence.

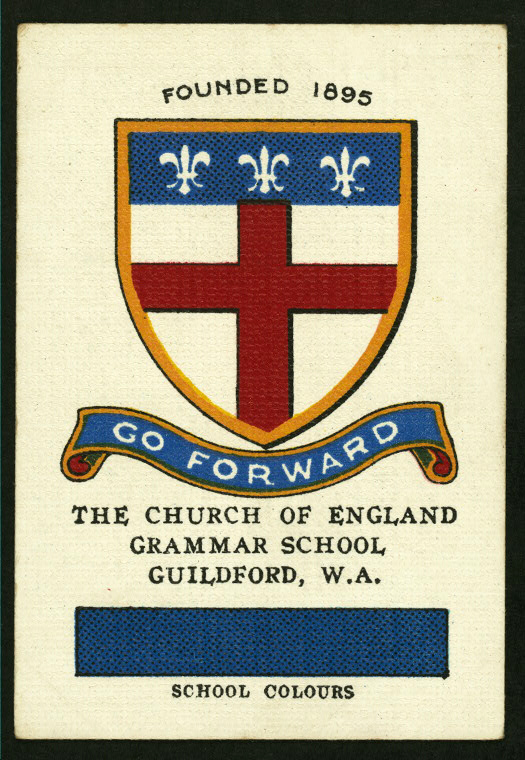
Collectable cigarette card featuring the Guildford colours and crest, c. 1920s

In March 1942, the staff and students of the senior school were evacuated to Fairbridge Farm School near Pinjarra for 18 months as a precaution during World War II.

The Guildford Grammar School Foundation was established in 1974, to help guarantee the financial independence of the school and to develop its standing within the Western Australian education system. The board of the foundation aims to establish a large and self-perpetuating capital fund of $30 million. Currently, a portion of the income generated from the foundation's assets funds a bursaries and scholarships program.

In 2019 Guildford Grammar School had 1,097 students, with capacity for 148 boarding students.

=== Coat of arms ===
The dedication of the school chapel to Saint Mary and Saint George took place on 25 March 1914. The dedication was the inspiration for the current coat of arms, which replaced the cross and coronet of the Harper family. The arms consist of the red cross of St George on a white shield below the three fleur de lys of St Mary against a dark blue field. "Go Forward", the school motto which succeeded the Harpers' Coelum ipsum petimus, appears in a scroll under the arms.

== Principals ==
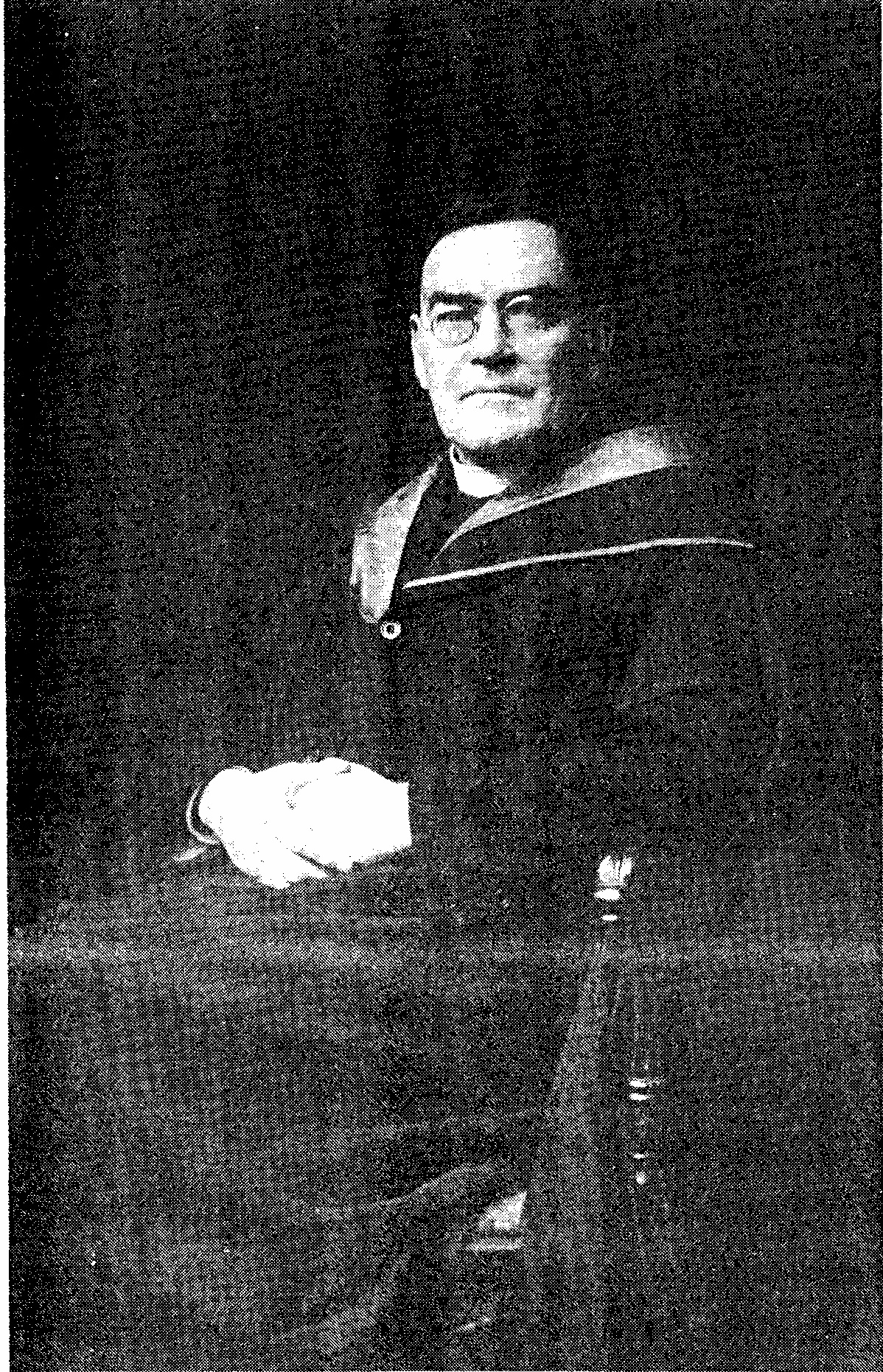
Percy Henn, the fourth Headmaster of Guildford Grammar School

The following individuals have served as Principal of Guildford Grammar School:

Ordinal	Headmaster	Term begin	Term end	Time in office	Notes
1	Frank Bennett	1896	1898	1–2 years	
2	Alex Gillespie	1899	1903	3–4 years	
3	William Corr	1904	1909	4–5 years	
4	Percy Henn	1910	1924	13–14 years	
5	Philip Hinckley	1925	1927	1–2 years	
6	Robert Freeth	1928	1949	20–21 years	
7	Peter Thwaites	1950	1956	5–6 years	
8	David Lawe Davies	1957	1978	20–21 years	
9	John Moody	1979	1996	16–17 years	
10	Kim Walton	1997	2002	4–5 years	
11	Robert Zordan	2003	2010	6–7 years	
12	Stephen Webber	2011	2019	14–15 years	
13	Anne Dunstan	2020	2022	5–6 years	
14	Peter Allen	2023	incumbent		

== Campus ==
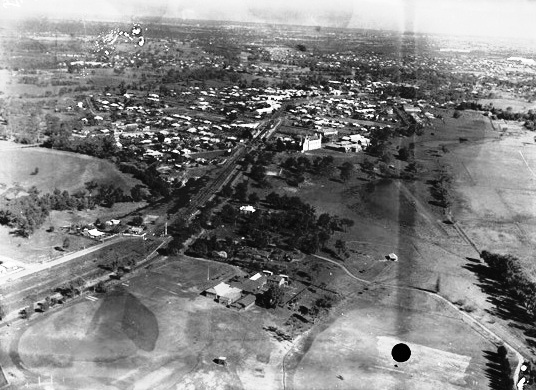
Guildford Grammar School grounds in 1933

Guildford Grammar School is located on a 100-acre (40 ha) campus on the banks of the Swan River and stands among trees and lawns. The campus has a number of buildings and sporting facilities necessary for the day to day educational needs of the students. Some of these buildings are of historical significance—including the chapel, which is listed with the Heritage Council of Western Australia. Most of the buildings and sporting fields are named after significant people in the school's foundation and history.

In 2005, the school embarked on a major redevelopment project, named the One Campus Project, the first major project to be undertaken at the school in 15 years. This project includes the redevelopment of the school's playing fields and property bordering the Great Eastern Highway. The project was expected to cost in excess of $5.5 million and included the construction of a new hockey pitch, a second football oval, 12 new acrylic surface tennis courts, a new sports pavilion and the reconstruction of Roberts Oval.

=== Chapel ===
The Federation Gothic-styled school chapel (the Chapel of St Mary and St George), first suggested by headmaster Canon P.U. Henn (after whom Henn's House was named) and funded by Cecil Oliverson, after whom the school gymnasium is named. It is heritage listed and contains a large amount of English Oak wood. It currently houses a Bible (the Windsor Bible) gifted to the school by Queen Elizabeth II as a replacement for the Bible gifted by King George V which was destroyed in a fire in 1980.

== Student life ==
Guildford offers an extracurricular program for students. The school also has boarding facilities for students who live in rural areas of Western Australia as well as international students. The major components of the program are sports, music, the arts and cadets.

The cadet program at Guildford dates back to 1904. The program is governed by the state and federal arms of the Australian Army Cadet Corps and is supported by the A SQD Tenth Light Horse.

Guildford participates in the national Tournament of Minds competition and has produced 15 teams composed of seven boys from Years 8 to 10 in 2007 and annually produces about 12 teams. Guildford has had success within this competition, regularly going into state finals and making the nationals in 2005, ranking fourth nationally in 2005 and being the top team for maths and engineering in Western Australia.

=== Academic studies ===
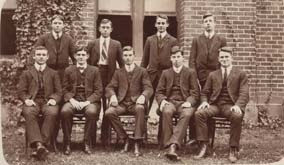
1913 school prefects

The school offers a range of academic pursuits for students, and also gives awards such as academic colours, subject awards and the dux award, which are given at an annual presentation night.

Guildford awards several scholarships based on academic merit to students, but under agreed PSA rules no member schools may award sports scholarships. To gain a scholarship a student must take the ACER (Australian Council for Educational Research) Co-operative Scholarship Examination, and also submit a portfolio. The shortlisted candidates attend an interview with the headmaster.

D'Arcy Slater Scholarship, which is awarded annually to a student entering Year 7 in memory of D'Arcy Slater, a student of the School who died in 1991. The student that receives the award must be a good all-rounder. This scholarship provides all tuition fees for the student.

Council Scholarships, the scholarship is an academic scholarship. Candidates must be under the age of 13 on the first day of January following the examination. This scholarship is tenable for between 25 and 50% of six years' worth of tuition fees.

Harry Campbell Pope Scholarships – Awarded to a number of students entering Year 7 of the Western Australian education system, following an examination and an interview with the Headmaster. These scholarships are worth 25% – 50% of tuition fees for six years.

Calder Crowther Scholarship – Awarded every two years to day student candidates from government schools in the vicinity of Guildford. It is worth 50% of tuition fees from years 7 to 12.

The school also awards Music and Choral scholarships.

=== Boarding ===
When Guildford opened in 1896, it was a day school; boarding was introduced for years 6–12. There are 130 boarders at the school.

All boarders live in one of the boarding halls of residence with their House-masters, House-mothers and boarding assistants. On weekends, boarders participate in a variety of activities arranged by staff and senior students. Boarders in years 10, 11 and 12 also participate in sport on a Saturday morning.

=== House system ===
Guildford Grammar School has an eight-house system in the senior school. Each house is named in honour of individuals who have had an association with the school and the Western Australian community including: Canon Percy Henn, an influential headmaster of the school, and James Stirling, a man much credited with the settlement of Western Australia. In the junior school, there is a four-house system. Each house, informally known as a quarter, is named after a cardinal point; north, east, south, and west.

The eight senior school houses are Henn's, School, Stirling, Harper, Bennett, St. George's, Woodbridge and Freeth House with each house being divided into six mentor groups with a mentor group for each year (e.g. Stirling Year 10, Henns Year 8 and so on). Each mentor group is overseen by a mentor and Head of House. The members of each house are led by the House Captain (elected each year by the members of the house).

The eight senior school houses compete against each other in three areas; sport (for the Cock House Cup), culture (for the Centenary Cup), and academic (for the John Gladstones' Cup). There is also the Council shield, which is awarded to the house adjudged to have been the most successful in the three competitions.

=== Performing arts and debating ===
Students can learn a music instrument during class time in the senior school. There are ensembles for students to join including the senior choir and guitar ensemble. Music is compulsory for all students from Kindergarten to year 6, with the option of continuing to TEE music in year 12. Senior school students have the opportunity to learn under experienced musicians.

The drama program at the school is based largely around the school production; recent productions include: Jesus Christ Superstar, Les Miserables and Amadeus. Heath Ledger, a prominent actor, attended Guildford Grammar School, where he had his first acting experiences, starring in a school production as Peter Pan at age 13.

Debating and public speaking are components of the co-curricular program at the school. Guildford Grammar School competes in Western Australian inter-school debating competition, which is run by the Western Australian debating league.

=== Sport ===
Guildford Grammar School was a founding member of the Public Schools Association (PSA) in 1905, and the Independent Primary School Heads of Australia (IPSHA) in 1968. The school competes in inter-school sports within both organisations.

In 2006, Guildford won none of the PSA sporting competitions, although it has won the following trophies more than five times; Swimming (18), Cricket (15), Athletics (12), Rugby (8), Football (6), and Rowing (Head of the River) (6).

Guildford won the Alcock Cup (Football – 2015) and the Darlot Cup (Cricket – 2018).

==== PSA premierships ====
Guildford Grammar has won the following PSA premierships.

- Athletics (12) – 1905, 1906, 1907, 1918, 1926, 1930, 1940, 1945, 1946, 1947, 1949, 1950
- Basketball (4) – 1981, 1983, 1991, 1993
- Cricket (16) – 1915, 1917, 1919, 1920, 1921, 1935, 1936, 1937, 1946, 1959, 1968, 1969, 1971, 1982, 1986, 2018
- Cross Country – 1982
- Football (7) – 1905, 1935, 1936, 1938, 1946, 1958, 2015
- Golf (6) – 2009, 2011, 2012, 2014, 2017, 2018
- Rowing (3) – 1992, 2001, 2013
- Rugby (8) – 1980, 1981, 1983, 1984, 1985, 1986, 1987, 1994
- Soccer (2) – 1990, 1994
- Swimming (18) – 1905, 1916, 1920, 1922, 1951, 1952, 1959, 1960, 1961, 1962, 1963, 1966, 1996, 1997, 1999, 2000, 2001, 2002
- Tennis – 1982
- Water Polo – 1998

== Alumni ==
Alumni of Guildford Grammar School are called "Old Guildfordians". Alumni may elect to join the Old Guildfordians Association, formerly the 'Old Boys' Association, an incorporated organisation established in 1905, which represents the former students of the school. The association exists to provide fellowship to former students, parents and staff and to support the school – especially in the provision of scholarships and financial assistance to families in need.

The Old Guildfordians Mundaring Hockey Club is an incorporated men's and women's hockey club based in the Guildford/Mundaring area. The club competes in various grades of the HockeyWA competition, from minkey (junior hockey) to senior's hockey. The club plays its home games at Lilac Hill Park, using the available facilities and clubrooms available. It is not a requirement of the club to have left school; in fact many of the clubs members haven't left school.

=== Notable alumni ===
- Corey Adamson, former baseball player.
- Cruze Ah-Nau, Rugby Union player
- Piers Akerman, newspaper columnist
- Simon Beasley, former AFL Footballer
- Sir Francis Burt, former Chief Justice of the Supreme Court of Western Australia from 1977 to 1988. Governor of Western Australia from 1990 to 1993
- Ben Carlin, circumnavigated the world in a Ford GPA
- Peter Corney, Anglican pastor and theologian
- John Day former MLA, Member for Kalamunda
- Andrew Denton, television presenter and producer
- Bruce Duperouzel, former Australian Football League player
- David Ellard, Australian Football League player who played for the Carlton Blues
- Zac Fisher, Australian Footballer League player for Carlton Blues
- Michael Gannon, President of Australian Medical Association (AMA), Former President of AMA Western Australia
- Cruize Garlett, former Australian Football League player.
- Deborah Vernon Hackett (1887–1965), mining company director
- Vernon Hamersley, MLC
- Kim Hames MLA, Member for Dawesville, Former Deputy Premier
- Kade Harvey, former state cricketer
- N'fa Jones, rapper
- Brendon Julian, international-level cricketer and television presenter
- Sir Wallace Kyle (1910–1988), 24th Governor of Western Australia, former Vice-Chief of the RAF Air Staff
- Karl Langdon, West Coast Eagles premiership player and radio presenter
- Zac Langdon, GWS Giants footballer
- Heath Ledger, Academy Award-winning actor
- Seaforth Mackenzie, author
- David Malcolm, Chief Justice of the Supreme Court of Western Australia from 1988 until 7 February 2006
- John McGuire, WAFL footballer and captain of an Aboriginal cricket XI which toured England in 1988
- Con Michael, former state cricketer
- Luke Miles, former Australian Football League player.
- David Moody, state and national cricketer
- Tom Moody, international-level cricketer and coach
- Paul Murray, former editor of The West Australian, columnist and radio commentator
- Kevin O'Halloran, gold medallist at the 1956 Summer Olympics in the 4 × 200 m freestyle relay
- Clancee Pearce, Australian Football League player for the Fremantle Dockers
- Arnold Potts, grazier, commanded defence of the Kokoda Trail during the Second World War
- Alex Rance, Australian rules footballer who played for Richmond
- John Steffensen, national sprinter
- Randolph Stow, poet and author
- Gerald Ugle, former Australian Football League player
- Carl Vine, musician and composer
- Archie Weller, screenwriter and a novelist
- Jordan Clark, Australian footballer

== See also ==
- List of schools in the Perth metropolitan area
- List of boarding schools in Australia
