= John L. C. Wickham =

John Leonard Clifton Wickham QC (5 June 1919 - 24 September 2018) was a judge of the Supreme Court of Western Australia.

He was born near Albany, Western Australia. He attended Guildford Grammar School as a boarding student, a classmate of Francis Burt, before studying law at the University of Western Australia. After graduating from university, he was admitted to practise as a solicitor in 1942. He joined the Perth law firm Joseph Muir and Williams, where Burt later became his colleague. Together with Burt, he went on to help found the Independent Bar of Western Australia before being appointed as Queen's Counsel in 1967.

Wickham was not long after appointed as a judge of the Supreme Court of Western Australia, where he served from 1969 to 1983. While a judge of the Supreme Court he was also appointed as the foundation chancellor of Murdoch University.

A year after retiring from the Supreme Court, he was appointed as a commissioner assisting the Senate inquiry into the conduct of High Court Justice Lionel Murphy. He was later appointed as the chairman of the Western Australian Anti-Corruption Commission from 1989 to 1997.
