= Corey Adamson =

Australian sportsman (born 1992)

- Outfielder
- Born: 23 February 1992 (age 34); Bullsbrook, Western Australia, Australia
- Bats: Left Throws: Right
- Stats at Baseball Reference

Corey Jon Adamson (born 23 February 1992) is an Australian sportsman who has played both professional baseball and professional Australian rules football.

Previously a professional baseball outfielder who played for the Australian national baseball team and in the San Diego Padres minor league system, he retired from baseball in 2014 to pursue an Australian rules football career, signing with the West Coast Eagles in the Australian Football League (AFL). Adamson had previously played underage representative football for Western Australia, being named in the under-15 All-Australian team, before deciding to pursue a career in baseball. He was signed to West Coast's rookie list under the three-year non-registered rule, which allows clubs to recruit players who have not been registered with an AFL-affiliated competition for more than three years. Adamson began the 2015 season in the WAFL reserves, playing for West Coast's affiliate, East Perth. He made his senior debut in round 13, kicking a goal in his first match, and remained in the senior team for the rest of the season. Adamson was delisted at the end of the 2016 AFL season without ever breaking through into West Coast's senior line-up.

Adamson is the son of Baseball Australia Hall of Fame inductee Tony Adamson.

== See also ==
- List of West Coast Eagles players
