= Guildford, Western Australia =

Guildford Perth, Western Australia
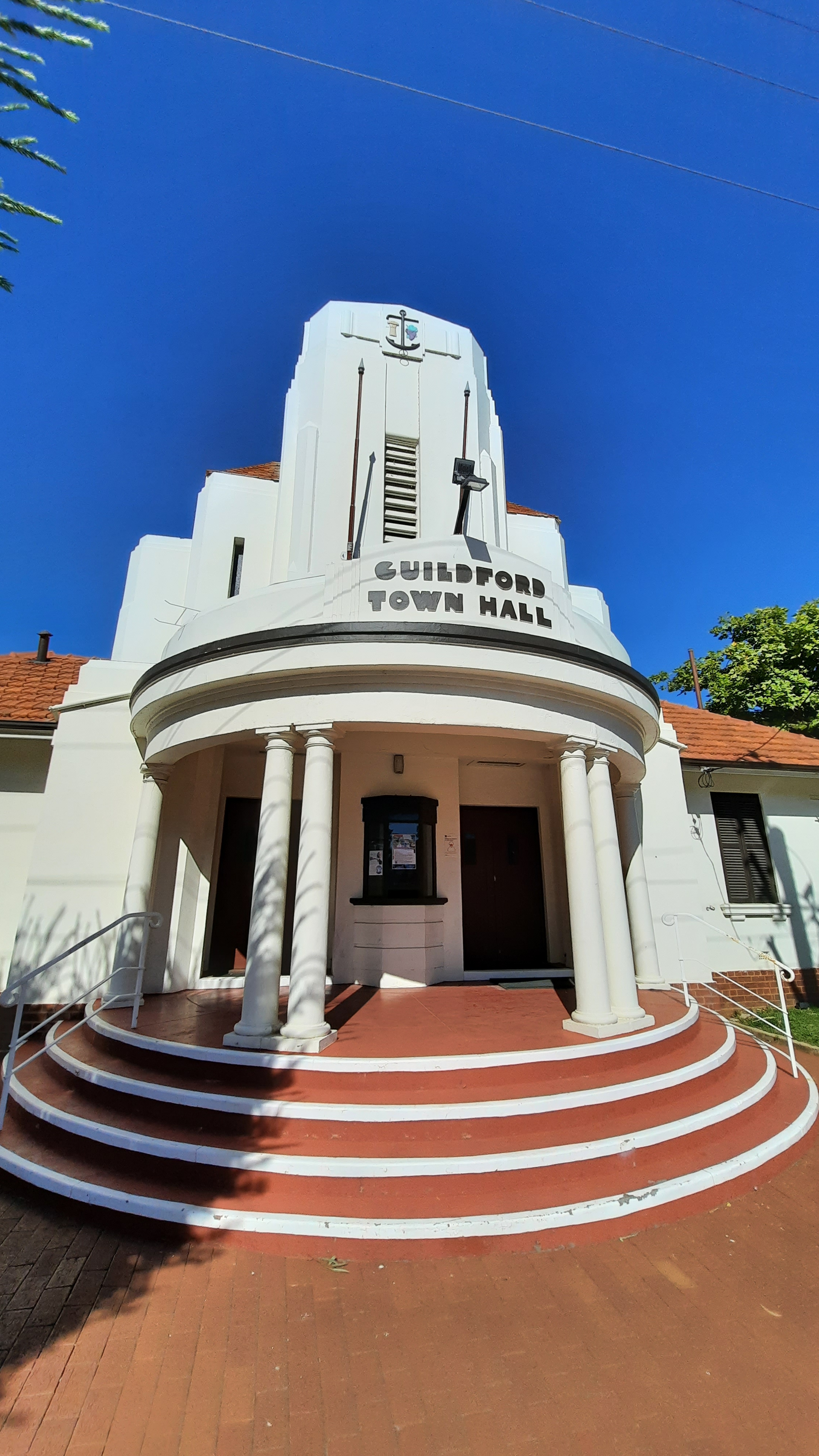
- Guildford Town Hall
- Coordinates: 31.9°S 115.973°E
- Population: 2,040 (SAL 2021)
- Established: 1829
- Postcode(s): 6055
- Location: 13 km (8 mi) NE of Perth
- LGA(s): City of Swan
- State electorate(s): Midland
- Federal division(s): Division of Hasluck
Suburbs around Guildford:
Eden Hill	Caversham	Woodbridge
Bassendean	Guildford	Hazelmere
Bassendean	South Guildford	Hazelmere

Guildford is a suburb of Perth, Western Australia, 12 km northeast of the city centre within the City of Swan. Guildford was founded in 1829 as one of the earliest settlements of the Swan River Colony. It is one of only three towns in the metropolitan area listed on the Register of the National Trust.

== History ==
Guildford was established in 1829 at the confluence of the Helena River and Swan River, being sited near a permanent fresh water supply.

During Captain Stirling's exploration for a suitable site to establish a colony on the western side of the Australian continent in the late 1820s, the exploration party of boats found a fresh water stream across the river from the site of Guildford which they called Success Hill.

Guildford was originally the centre of the Swan River Colony before Perth succeeded in being the dominant location on the Swan Coastal Plain.

A Guildford Town Trust was established in 1838, but ceased to function within a couple of years. It was reconstituted in 1863, and became the Municipality of Guildford in 1871.

Guildford was originally the political centre of what is now called the City of Swan. The original council chambers have been converted to a library. Alongside the library stands the town hall; behind this is the stables built for the councillors while attending meetings and as a depot for council equipment. These stables have been converted and are now the home of the Garrick Theatre, which is the oldest operating theatre group in Western Australia. The original structure is still visible. The roof still has its original shingles in place, though from the outside they have been covered by corrugated galvanised iron.

It also houses the oldest government funded primary school in Western Australia: Guildford Primary School.

== Historic sites ==
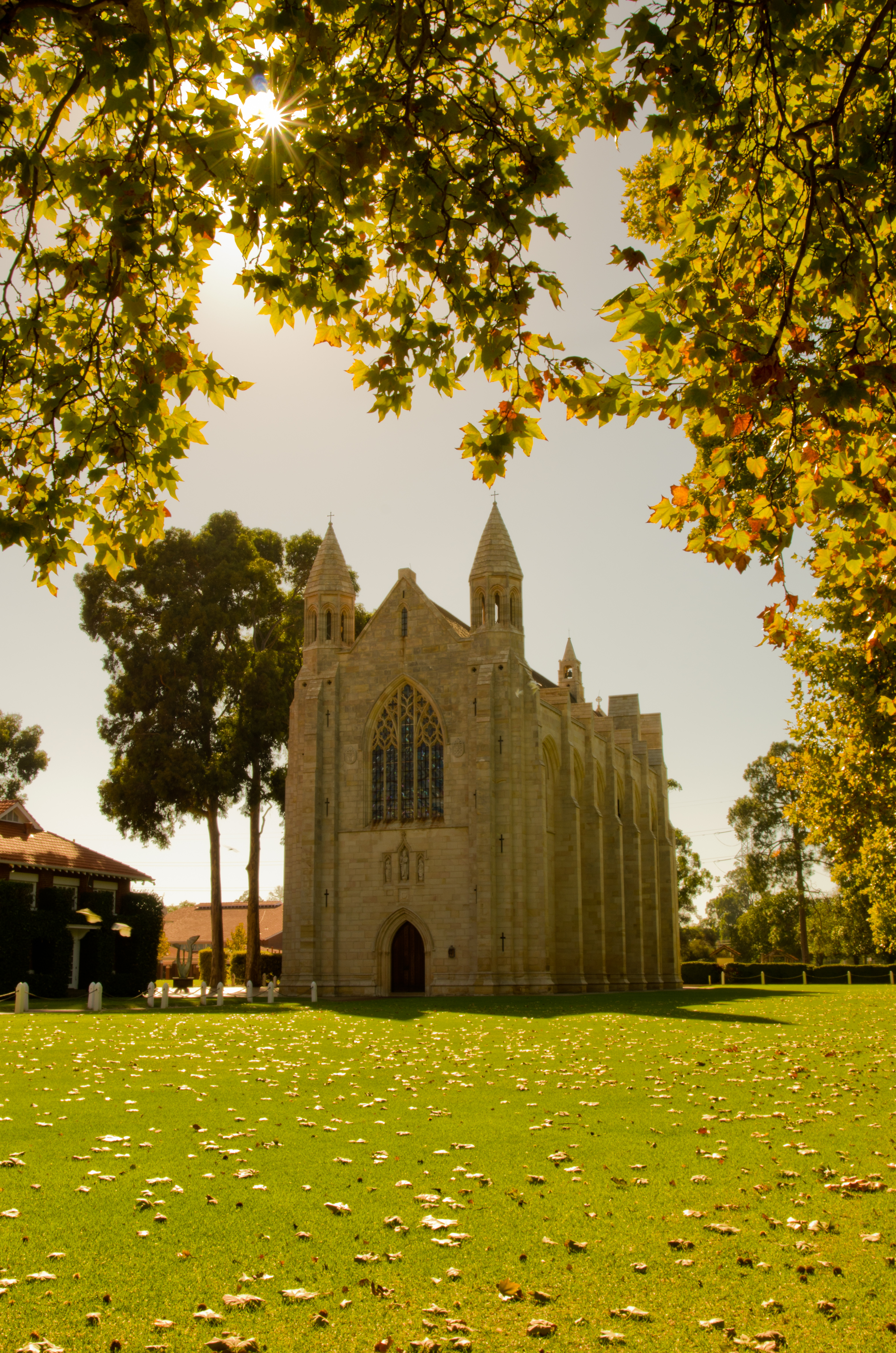
Guildford Grammar School Chapel

Over 200 locations in Guildford are listed on the State Register of Heritage Places, including:

- St Matthew's Church, Guildford (1836)
- Guildford Railway Station Precinct (1881)
- Guildford Grammar School (1896) and School Chapel (1914)
- Garrick Theatre (1932)

== Notable residents ==
- George Cyril Abdullah (1919-1984) was a prominent Aboriginal community leader who was born in Guildford to a Bengali labourer father and Indigenous mother.
- Charles Walter Harper (1880-1956) was an orchardist and co-operator.
- Malvina Evalyn Wood (1893-1976), librarian and college warden.

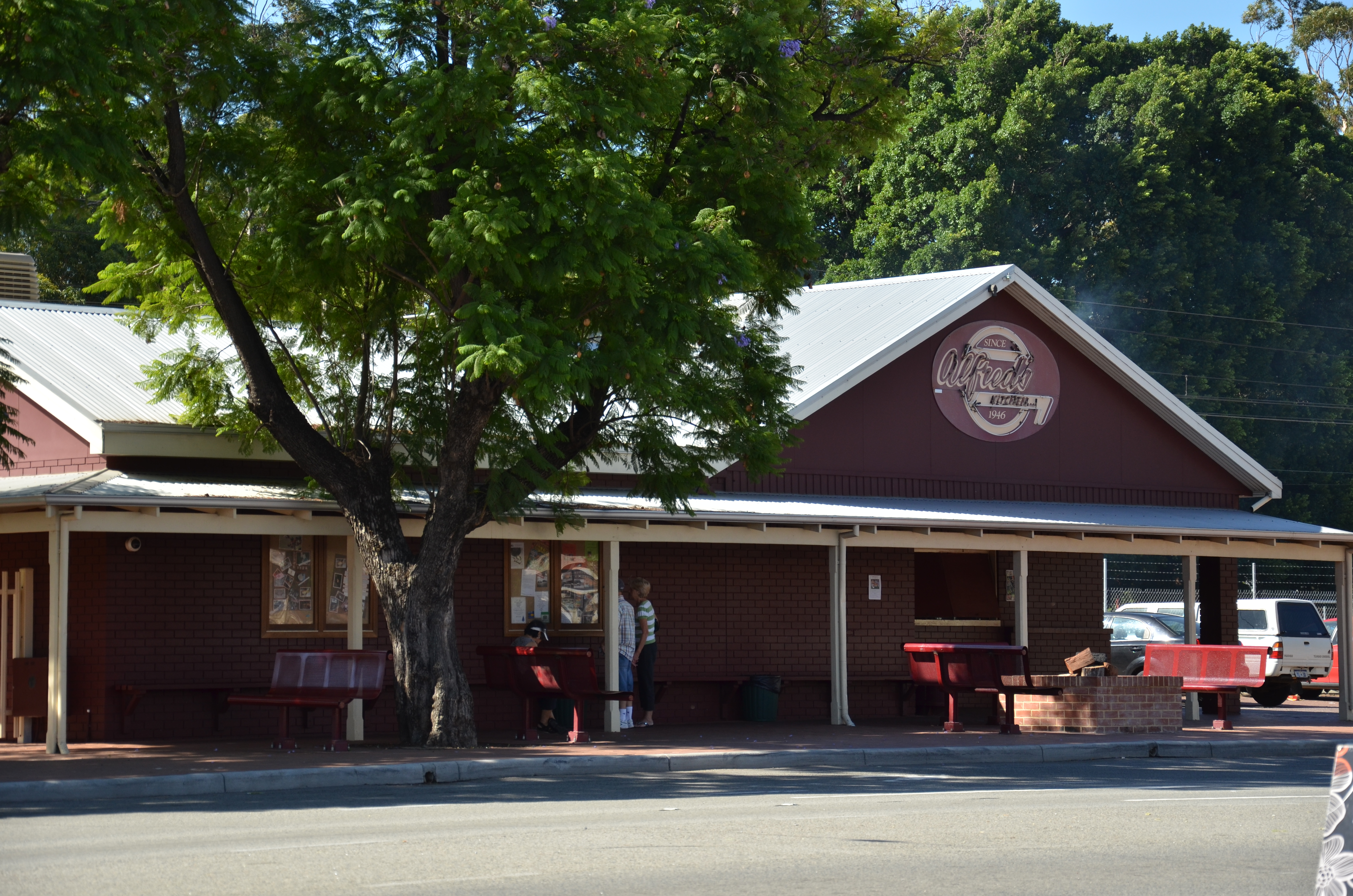
Alfred's Kitchen

== Transport ==
Guildford is located on the Midland railway line and contains the stations of Guildford and East Guildford.

=== Bus ===
- 290 Midland Station to Redcliffe Station – serves Great Eastern Highway, East Street, James Street and Johnson Street

=== Rail ===
- Midland Line
  - Guildford Station
  - East Guildford Station

== See also ==
- Guildford railway station, Perth
- Guildford Grammar School
