= Kensington (disambiguation) =

Kensington is a district in London's Royal Borough of Kensington and Chelsea. It may also refer to:

== Places ==
=== Australia ===
- Kensington, New South Wales, an eastern suburb of Sydney
- Kensington, Queensland, a locality
- Kensington, South Australia, an eastern suburb of Adelaide
- Kensington, Victoria, a suburb of Melbourne
- Kensington, Western Australia, a suburb of Perth

=== Canada ===
- Kensington, Prince Edward Island, a town in Prince County, Prince Edward Island
- Kensington, Calgary, Alberta, a neighbourhood
- Kensington, Edmonton, Alberta, a neighbourhood

=== Greece ===
- Kensington-on-Sea, Corfu

=== New Zealand ===
- Kensington, Dunedin, a suburb of Dunedin
- Kensington, Timaru, a suburb of Timaru
- Kensington, Whangārei, a suburb of Whangārei

=== South Africa ===
- Kensington, Cape Town, a northern suburb in Cape Town
- Kensington, Johannesburg, a suburb in eastern Johannesburg
  - Kensington (House of Assembly of South Africa constituency)
- Kensington, Port Elizabeth, an inner-city suburb of Port Elizabeth
- Kensington B, a suburb in Randburg, Gauteng

=== United Kingdom ===
- Kensington, London
  - Kensington (UK Parliament constituency)
  - Royal Borough of Kensington and Chelsea
  - Metropolitan Borough of Kensington
- Kensington, Liverpool

=== United States ===
- Kensington, California, an unincorporated community
- Kensington, San Diego, California, a neighborhood of San Diego, California
- Kensington, Connecticut, a census-designated place
- Kensington, Georgia, an unincorporated community
- Kensington, Chicago, a neighborhood of Chicago, Illinois
- Kensington, Kansas, a city
- Kensington, Maryland, a town
- Kensington, Michigan, an unincorporated community
- Kensington, Minnesota, a city
- Kensington, New Hampshire, a town
- Kensington, New York, a village
- Kensington, Brooklyn, New York, a neighborhood of Brooklyn, New York
- Kensington, Ohio, an unincorporated community
- New Kensington, Pennsylvania, a borough
- Kensington, Philadelphia, Pennsylvania, a neighborhood of Philadelphia, Pennsylvania
  - Kensington District, Pennsylvania, a former district that comprises the modern neighborhood

== Roads ==
=== London ===
- Kensington Gore
- Kensington High Street
- Kensington Road
- Kensington Palace Gardens

=== Elsewhere ===
- Kensington Expressway, an expressway in Buffalo, New York
- Kensington Road, Adelaide, Australia

== Railway stations ==
- Kensington station (disambiguation), several railway stations, including:
  - Kensington station (MARTA), a passenger rail station in Decatur, Georgia
  - Kensington (Olympia) station, a surface and underground station in London
  - Kensington railway station, Melbourne, Australia
  - Kensington station (Maryland) in Kensington, Maryland
  - Kensington/115th Street station, a commuter railroad station in Chicago, Illinois

== Ships ==
See List of ships named Kensington

== Other uses ==
- Kensington (band), a Dutch musical group
- Kensington (game), a board game
- Kensington, Toowoomba, a heritage house in Queensland
- Kensington Publishing, a publishing company
- Kensington Computer Products Group, a security and computer accessories company
  - Kensington Security Slot, a slot and lock system for securing computer hardware
- Kensington Oval, an international cricket stadium located in Bridgetown, Barbados

== See also ==
- Kennington (disambiguation)
- Kensington Gardens (disambiguation)
- Kensington Market, in Toronto
- Kensington Market (band), a Canadian musical group
- Kensington Palace
- Kensington Park (disambiguation)
- Kensington Prairie Elementary School in Surrey, British Columbia, Canada
- Kensington Pride (mango), a commercial mango cultivar from Australia
- Kensington Runestone, a rune stone found in Minnesota, possibly carved by Viking explorers or a hoax
- North Kensington, London
- South Kensington (disambiguation)
- West Kensington (disambiguation)
