= St James, Western Australia =

St James
- Suburb
- Interactive map of St James
- Coordinates: 32.001°S 115.911°E
- Country: Australia
- State: Western Australia
- City: Perth
- LGAs: Town of Victoria Park; City of Canning
- Established: 1957

Government
  - State electorate: Victoria Park
  - Federal division: Swan

Area
  - Total: 1.8 km^{2} (0.69 sq mi)

Population
  - Total: 4,894 (SAL 2021)
- Postcode: 6102
Suburbs around St James
East Victoria Park	East Victoria Park	Welshpool
Bentley	St James	Bentley
Bentley	Bentley	Bentley

St James is a suburb of Perth, Western Australia, shared between the Town of Victoria Park and the City of Canning in the city's inner south-east.

St James is almost wholly residential, with a small commercial strip along Albany Highway and scattered businesses elsewhere. Boundary Road defines the boundary between the City of Canning and Town of Victoria Park and is a main thoroughfare running south-west to north-east through the middle of the suburb. The main north-west to south-east thoroughfares are Albany Highway in the north-east, with Berwick Street and Chapman Road (with a portion running north-south) through the middle.

== Name ==
The name St James Park was proposed by the Canning Road Board in 1939 for the area bounded by Boundary Road, Albany Highway, Welshpool Road, the Armadale railway line (beside Sevenoaks Street), Ewing Street, Bedford Park, and Taree Street. It was apparently named after St James's Park in London. The name was initially rejected by the state government's Nomenclature Committee, as it had no historical significance to Western Australia. However, it remained in local use and in 1957 the northern portion of Bentley was officially gazetted as the new suburb of St James.

A number of streets in the suburb are named after notable UK Prime Ministers and Members of Parliament (including Palmerston, Walpole and Pitt streets).

== History ==
Prior to European settlement, St James was occupied by the Beeloo subgroup of the Noongar people.

From the 1860s, the area was known as Bentley Hill, after John Bentley (1822–1871), a Crimean War veteran who arrived in Western Australia as a Pensioner Guard, and in 1862–1864 supervised convicts building Albany Road (that later became Albany Highway). A large camp for the road workers was established on what is now St James, while the surrounding, lower-lying areas became known simply as Bentley.

Until World War II, most of St James was vacant bushland with some portions used for agricultural purposes. In the post-war period, a significant amount of public housing was built by the State Housing Commission in St James and Bentley. Hundreds of blocks were also made available to war veterans by the War Service Homes Commission.

In the 1990s the State Housing Commission began a process of redeveloping its public housing assets in St James and neighbouring suburbs, with the homes built in the 1950s demolished and either sold to private owners as vacant lots or rebuilt at higher densities.

== Transport ==
=== Bus ===
- 34 Perth Busport to Cannington Station – serves Holder Street, Walpole Street and Pollock Street
- 177 Elizabeth Quay Bus Station to Cannington Station – serves Berwick Street and Chapman Road
- 178 and 179 Elizabeth Quay Bus Station to Bull Creek Station – serve Berwick Street, Chapman Road and Walpole Street
- 220 Perth Busport to Armadale Station – serves Albany Highway
- 222 Curtin University Bus Station to Cannington Station – serves Hill View Terrace, Holder Street, Walpole Street and Chapman Road
- 930 Elizabeth Quay Bus Station to Thornlie Station (high frequency) – serves Albany Highway

Bus routes serving Hill View Terrace:

- 998 Fremantle Station to Fremantle Station (limited stops) – CircleRoute clockwise
- 999 Fremantle Station to Fremantle Station (limited stops) – CircleRoute anti-clockwise
