= Como, Western Australia =

Como Perth, Western Australia
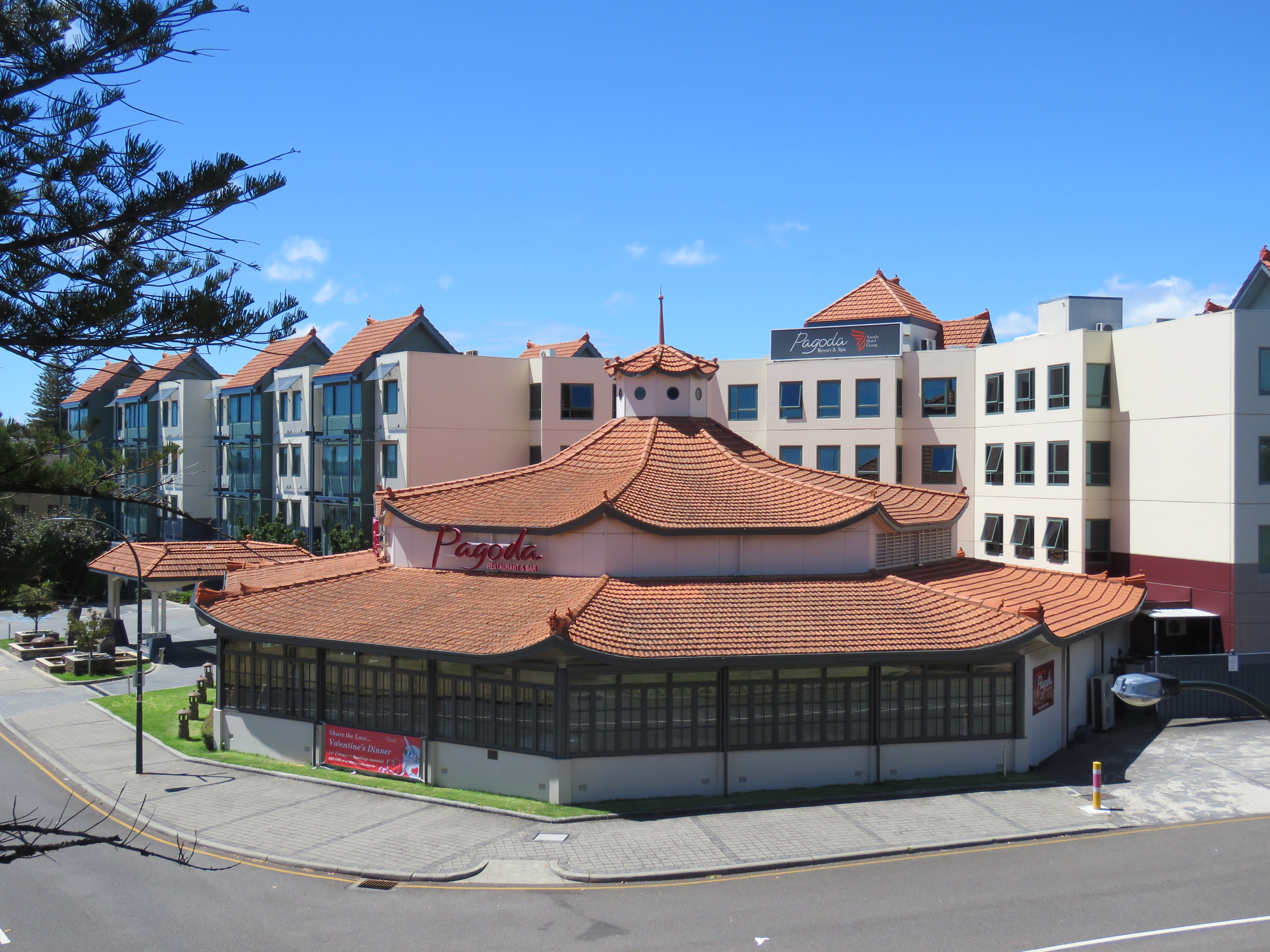
- The state heritage listed Pagoda restaurant, Como
- Coordinates: 31°59′59″S 115°52′04″E
- Population: 14,786 (SAL 2021)
- Established: 1905
- Postcode(s): 6152
- Area: 6.7 km^{2} (2.6 sq mi)
- Location: 6 km (4 mi) from Perth
- LGA(s): City of South Perth
- State electorate(s): South Perth
- Federal division(s): Swan
Suburbs around Como:
| Swan River | South Perth | Kensington |
| Swan River | Como | Bentley |
| Canning River | Salter Point | Manning |

Como is a suburb of Perth, Western Australia. Its local government area is the City of South Perth. The suburb has a population of 12,423. Canning Highway divides the suburb.

== History ==
The suburb of Como was originally made up of three land grants, purchased by Christchurch farmer Edmund Hugh Comer in February 1891. The land was subdivided in 1905 under the name Como Estate, which is thought to be derived from either the owner's surname or the area of the same name in northern Italy. Como forms part of the City of South Perth.

== Facilities ==
Como is serviced by the Canning Bridge railway station, which is on the Mandurah railway line, and is served by buses as well.

There are four schools in the area. These are the Collier and Como Primary Schools, Como Secondary College (previously Como Senior High School), and Penrhos College, a private all-girls school which has a primary school and a high school.

== Transport ==
=== Bus ===
- 30 Perth Busport to Curtin University Bus Station – serves Labouchere Road, Thelma Street, Robert Street, Henley Street, Clydesdale Street, McDougall Street, Lockhart Street, Davilak Street, Ley Street, Paterson Street and Gentilli Way
- 31 Perth Busport to Salter Point – serves Labouchere Road, Thelma Street, Barker Avenue, Talbot Avenue and Henley Street
- 32 Elizabeth Quay Bus Station to Como – serves Coode Street, Thelma Street and Melville Parade
- 33 Elizabeth Quay Bus Station to Curtin Central Bus Station – serves Hayman Road
- 34 Perth Busport to Cannington Station – serves South Terrace, Murray Street, Thelma Street, Morrison Street, Bruce Street, Henley Street, Jackson Road and Kent Street
- 100 Canning Bridge Station to Cannington Station – serves Canning Highway and Henley Street
- 101 Canning Bridge Station to Curtin Central Bus Station – serves Canning Highway, Henley Street and Kent Street
- 148 Como to Fremantle Station – serves Clydesdale Street, Henley Street, Canning Highway and Canning Bridge Station
- 284 Curtin University Bus Station to Belmont Forum – serves Kent Street and Hayman Road
- 910 Perth Busport to Fremantle Station (high frequency) – serves Canning Highway and Canning Bridge Station
- 960 Curtin University Bus Station to Mirrabooka Bus Station (high frequency) – serves Kent Street

Bus routes serving Canning Bridge Station:

- 111 and 160 WACA Ground to Fremantle Station
- 114 Elizabeth Quay Bus Station to Lake Coogee
- 115 Elizabeth Quay Bus Station to Hamilton Hill Memorial Hall
- 158 Elizabeth Quay Bus Station to Fremantle Station

=== Rail ===
- Mandurah Line
  - Canning Bridge Station
