= Kent Street, Perth =

Street in Perth, Western Australia

Kent Street Western Australia

General information
- Type: Road
- Length: 4.1 km (2.5 mi)
- Opened: 1900s & 1970s/1980s

Major junctions
- Northeast end: Albany Highway, East Victoria Park
- Hayman Road; Berwick Street
- Southwest end: Manning Road, Karawara

Location(s)
- Major suburbs: East Victoria Park, Kensington, Bentley, Karawara

Kent Street in Perth, Western Australia is a major access road to many facilities and places like Curtin University and the Perth Hockey Stadium.

Kent Street is approximately 4.1 kilometres (2.5 mi) in length, running south-west from Albany Highway through to Manning Road. Kent Street forms the boundary between the City of South Perth and the Town of Victoria Park.

== Significant buildings ==
The Park Recreation Centre (Leisurelife Centre) is located at the northern end of the road, at its intersection with Gloucester Street. The Park Recreation Centre being the main indoor recreation centre for the Town of Victoria Park. Kent Street is also the street address for Kent Street Senior High School, which was the first state government school to be built south of the Swan River.

Kent Street also runs through the centre of Technology Park Bentley, which houses a number of innovative Research and Development based organisations, including Perth's CSIRO building and one of Australia Post's major freight factories.

Curtin University is also located on Kent Street. Curtin University is Western Australia's largest university with over 40,000 students.

The Karawara (Waterford Plaza) Shopping Centre is located at the southern end of Kent Street, on the north-western side of its intersection with Manning Road.

== Significant parks and reserves ==
A number of parks and reserves front onto Kent Street, including Kensington Bushland Reserve. John McMillan Park, Harold Rossiter Park, Barblett Oval and Endiburgh Oval. The Collier Park Golf Course is also located along Kent Street.

Kent Street is a dual carriageway road between Manning Road and Hayman Road, with a major round-about at that intersection. Road verges in some parts of Kent Street have been set aside for future widening.

== Major intersections ==
LGA	Location	km	mi	Destinations	Notes
Victoria Park	Victoria Park-East Victoria Park boundary	0.0	0.0	Albany Highway – Perth, Lathlain, Cannington	Northern terminus at peanut roundabout, continues north as Miller Street
Victoria Park	Victoria Park-East Victoria Park boundary	0.4	0.25	Gloucester Street	Roundabout
Victoria Park	Victoria Park-East Victoria Park boundary	0.6	0.37	Berwick Street – St James, Bentley	Signalised intersection
Victoria Park	Kensington-East Victoria Park boundary	1.0	0.62	Devenish Street	Roundabout
Victoria Park	Kensington-East Victoria Park boundary	1.3	0.81	Etwell Street	Roundabout
South Perth-Victoria Park boundary	Kensington-East Victoria Park-Bentley tripoint	1.6	0.99	Jarrah Road – St James	Roundabout
South Perth-Victoria Park boundary	Kensington-Bentley boundary	2.1	1.3	Dick Perry Avenue west / Turner Avenue east.	Roundabout
South Perth-Victoria Park boundary	Kensington-Bentley-Como tripoint	2.4	1.5	Hayman Road – South Perth, Curtin University	Roundabout
South Perth-Victoria Park boundary	Karawara-Bentley-Waterford tripoint	4.1	2.5	Manning Road (State Route 26) – Manning, Wilson, Cannington	Southern terminus at signalised intersection. Continue south as Waterford Avenue
1.000 mi = 1.609 km; 1.000 km = 0.621 mi Note: Intersections with minor local roads are not shown
