= Kennington (disambiguation) =

Kennington is a district of London, England.

Kennington may also refer to

- Kennington, Kent, a suburb of Ashford, England
- Kennington, Oxfordshire, England
- Kennington, New Zealand
- Kennington, Victoria, a suburb of Bendigo, Australia

== Constituencies ==
- Kennington (London County Council constituency)
- Kennington (UK Parliament constituency)

== Wards ==
- Kennington (ward)

== Railway stations ==
- Kennington tube station, London

== See also ==
- Kennington (surname)
- Kensington (disambiguation)
- Cannington (disambiguation)
