= Kennington (surname) =

Kennington is a surname. Notable people with the surname include:

- Alan Kennington (rugby), Australian rugby player
- Alan Kennington (writer) (1906–1986), British novelist
- D. J. Kennington (born 1977), Canadian stock car racing driver
- Dale Kennington (1935–2017), American artist
- Eric Kennington (1888–1960), English sculptor
- Jill Kennington (born 1943), British fashion model and photographer
- Richard Kennington (1921–1999), American philosopher
- Thomas Benjamin Kennington (1856–1916), British painter
