= Curtin Central bus station =

Bus station in Perth, Australia

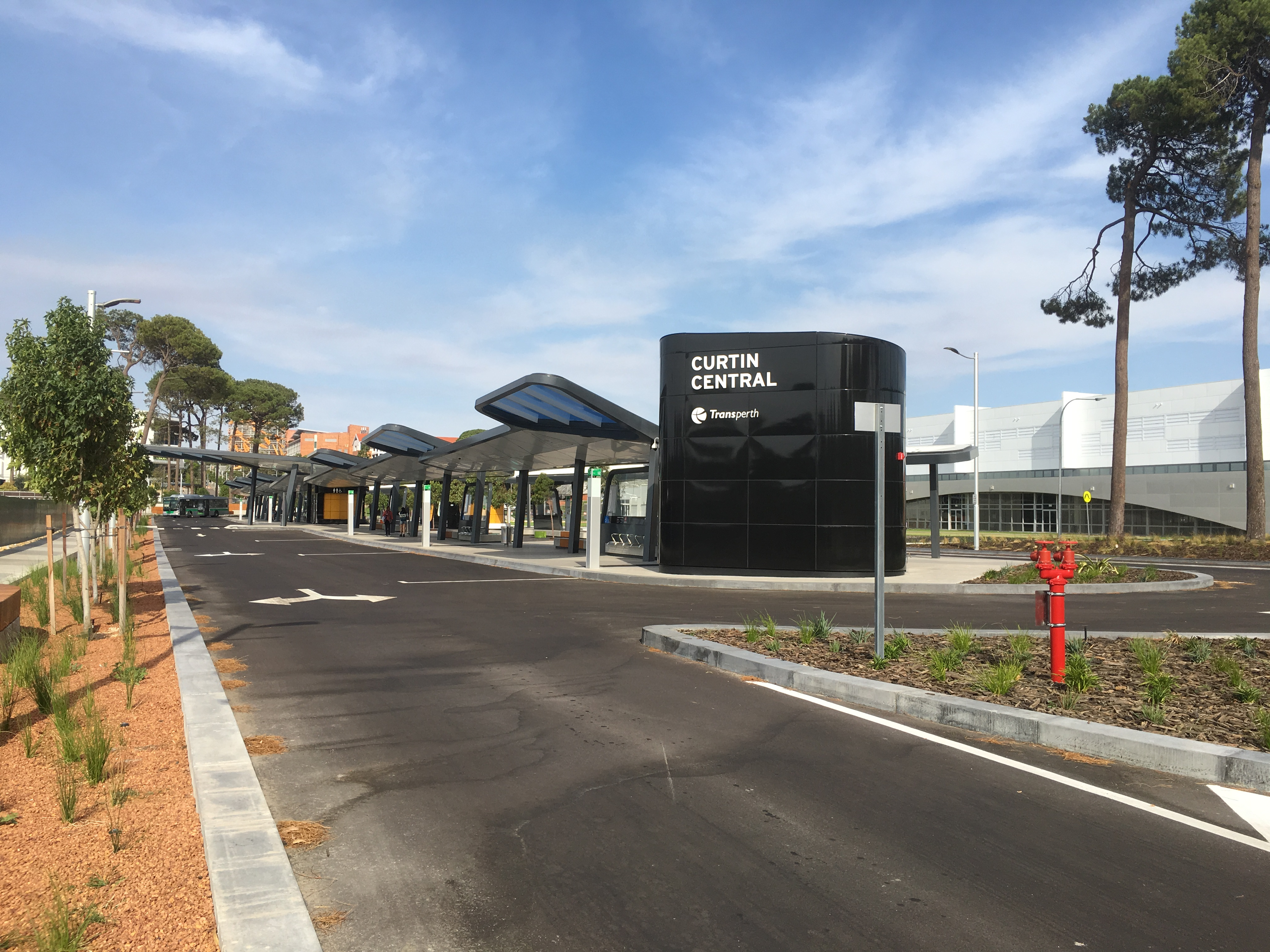

General information
- Location: Karrak Drive, Bentley, Western Australia; Australia
- Coordinates: 32°00′08″S 115°53′25″E
- Owner: Public Transport Authority
- Operator: Transperth
- Bus routes: 6, 1 special event route
- Bus stands: 12

Other information
- Fare zone: 1

History
- Opened: 17 February 2019
Location

Curtin Central bus station is a Transperth bus station located at the Curtin University's Bentley campus. It has twelve stands, six bus layover bays and is served by six regular Transperth routes operated by Path Transit and Swan Transit as well as one special events route to Perth Stadium.

== Overview ==
Curtin Central bus station was opened on 17 February 2019. It took 18 months to construct. Initially, 944 buses served the station each weekday. It was a joint project between the Public Transport Authority (PTA) and Curtin University. The total budget was $15 million, with the PTA contributing $5 million, and Curtin University paying for the rest. It is at the centre of the Curtin Exchange Precinct, a transit-oriented development featuring student accommodation and retail.

== Bus routes ==
Stop	Route	Destination / description	Notes
Stand 1	33	to Elizabeth Quay Bus Station via Kensington	
Stand 1	284	to Belmont via Victoria Park & Carlisle	
Stand 2		Set down only	
Stand 3	34	to Perth Busport via Karawara, Manning, Como, South Perth & Elizabeth Quay Bus Station	
Stand 4			
Stand 5	920	to Canning Bridge Station via Kent Street	High frequency
Stand 6	960	to Mirrabooka Bus Station via Perth Busport, Edith Cowan University, Mount Lawley & Alexander Drive	High frequency
Stand 7	960	to Curtin University Bus Station	High frequency
Stand 8	34	to Cannington Station via Curtin University, Ashburton Street & Bentley Plaza	
Stand 9	920	to Cannington Station via Curtin University bus station, Lawson Street & Manning Road	High frequency
Stand 9	657	to Perth Stadium Bus Station	Special Event Services
Stand 10	101	to Canning Bridge Station via Curtin University & Lawson Street	
Stand 11	284	to Curtin University Bus Station	
Stand 12			

== General references ==
- "WA Curtin Central Bus Station Complete". Australasian Bus & Coach. Bauer Trader Media. 13 February 2019. Archived from the original on 13 February 2019. Additional archives: 16 February 2019.
