= Alan Kennington =

Alan Kennington may refer to:

- Alan Kennington (writer)
- Alan Kennington (rugby)
