= Technology Park Bentley =

Technology park in Bentley, Western Australia

Coordinates: 31.9973°S 115.8907°E

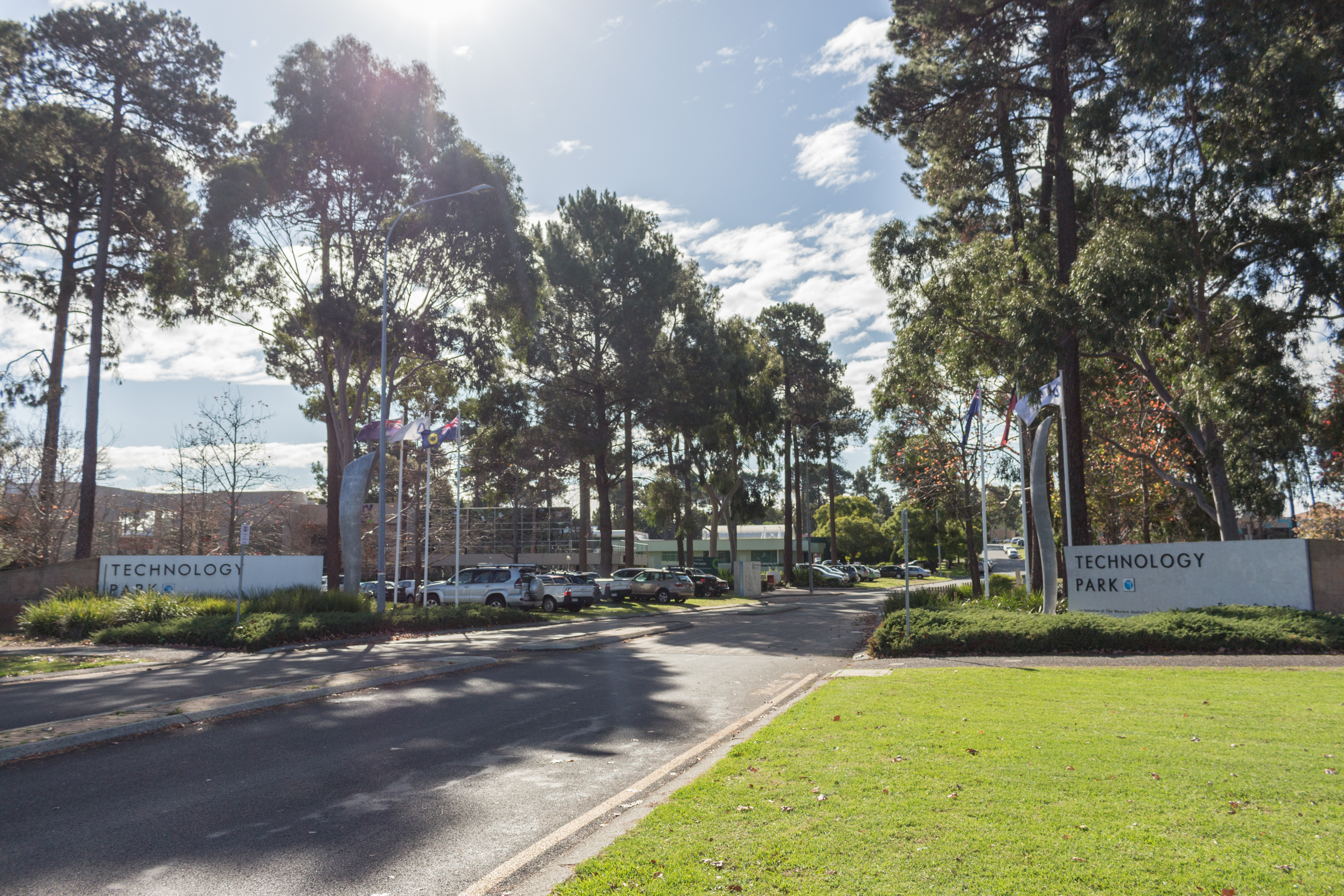
The main entrance to Technology Park Bentley

Technology Park Bentley in Perth, Western Australia is the country’s oldest technology park, though parks in Adelaide and Canberra were also in the pipeline when it was completed. The concept of the park was to be close to an education institute of higher learning so that there can be an exchange of ideas and expertise. The park was centred around a core building for technology from which the park would grow.

Technology Park officially opened in July 1985.

Technology Park Bentley is located across the southern Perth suburbs of Bentley and Keningston. While the Bentley land was part of the parcel that was reserved in 1900 for the WA Education Department and assigned to the WA Institute of Technology, the Kensington land was owned by the Western Australian Government and housed the Department of Agriculture, which was closed after extensive asbestos issues were identified and the land cleared. The Kensington portion was appended to Technology Park once that cleanup had been completed.

The tenancies of the park are restricted to organisations engaged in:

- Information technology and telecommunications
- Renewable energy and clean technologies
- Life sciences

== Tenants ==
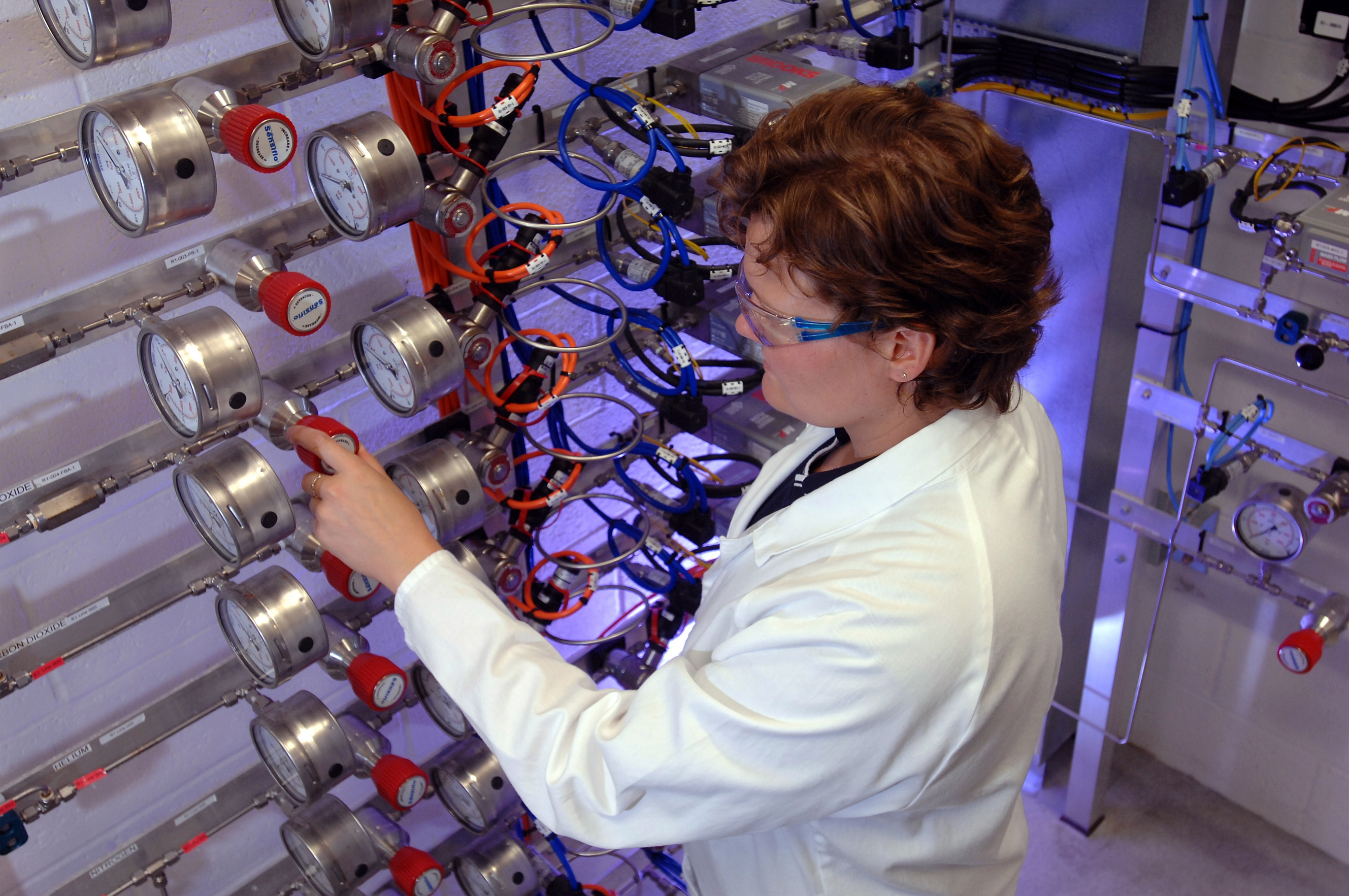
A research scientist working at the Australian Resources Research Centre (ARRC) in Technology Park

Some 100 companies currently operate at any one time in the Park, which is operating at maximum capacity, while all new tenants require government ministerial approval to locate in the Park. Tenants include Australian Institute of Technology Transfer, Curtin University, Horizon Power and the University of New South Wales.

The park is home to iVEC's Pawsey Centre, a high performance computing centre named after the 'father of Australian radio astronomy' Joseph Lade Pawsey (1908–1962). The centre hosts supercomputing facilities and expertise to support the international Square Kilometre Array program, geosciences and other high-end science.

== Ownership and governance ==
Technology Park Bentley is governed by the Government of Western Australia's Industry and Technology Development (ITD) Act (1998), which regulates the nature of businesses that can operate within the park, ensuring tenants' enterprises have a technological and innovation focus in research and development. The Minister for Commerce, through the Department of Commerce, manages the strategic direction and operations of the park.

Approximately 70% of the land is privately owned.
