= Bentley, Western Australia =

Bentley
- Suburb
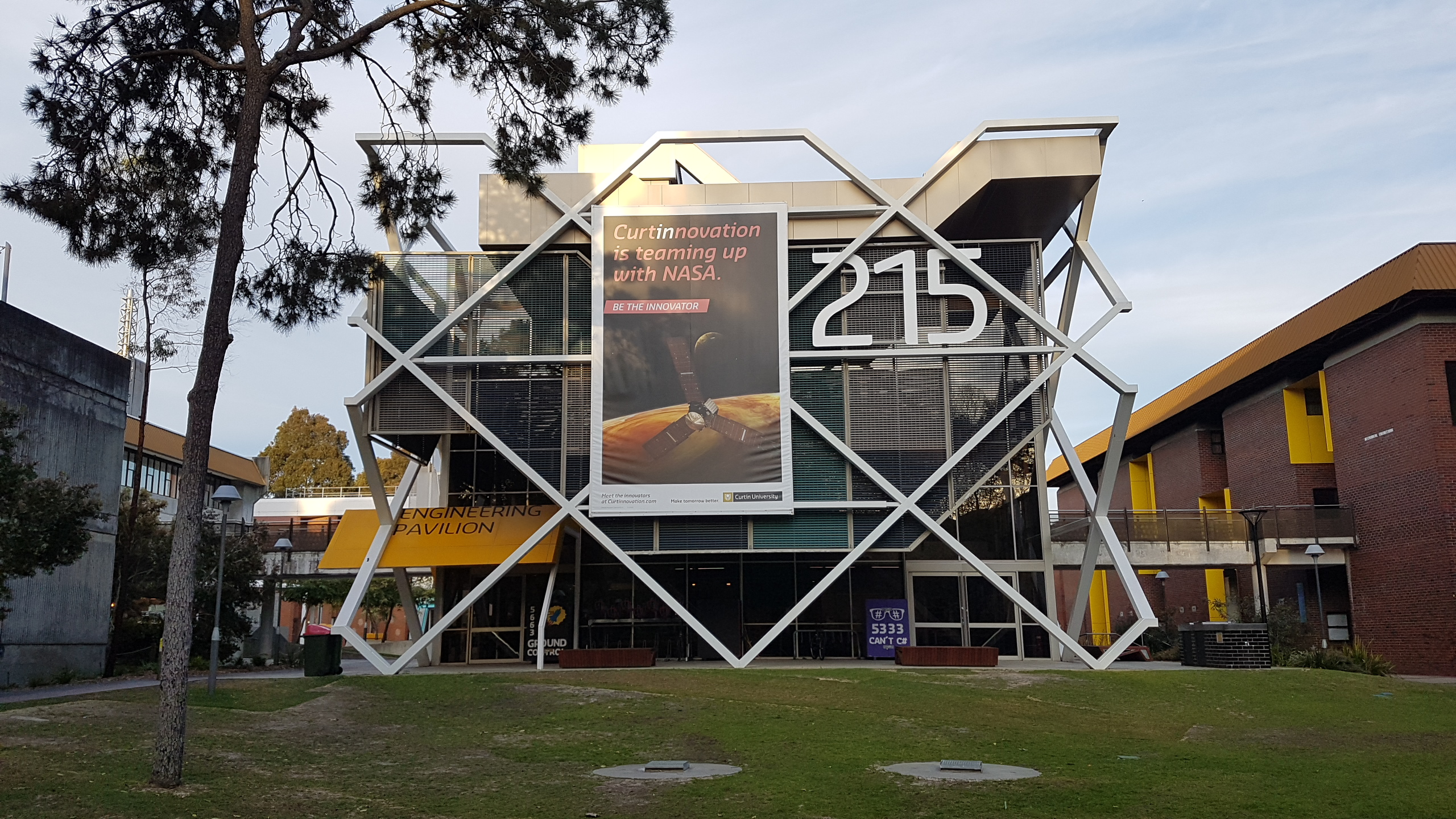
- Engineering Pavilion at Curtin University in Bentley
- Interactive map of Bentley
- Coordinates: 32°00′30″S 115°54′24″E
- Country: Australia
- State: Western Australia
- City: Perth
- LGAs: City of Canning; Town of Victoria Park
- Location: 8 km (5.0 mi) from Perth
- Established: 1940s

Government
  - State electorate: Victoria Park
  - Federal division: Swan

Area
  - Total: 5.5 km^{2} (2.1 sq mi)

Population
  - Total: 9,051 (SAL 2021)
- Postcode: 6102
Suburbs around Bentley
East Victoria Park	St James	Welshpool
Karawara	Bentley	Cannington
Waterford	Wilson	Cannington

Bentley is a southern suburb of Perth, the capital city of Western Australia, 8 kilometres (5.0 mi) southeast of Perth's central business district. Its local government areas are the City of Canning and the Town of Victoria Park. Bentley is home to the main campus of Curtin University and Technology Park.

== History ==
Prior to European settlement, the area was originally home to the Beeloo Nyungar people, whose territory extended from the Canning River to the Darling Scarp. The Beeloo hunted and fished in land close to the river, which was then forested with jarrah and marri trees, as much of the metropolitan area was at the time. In 2001, the ABS reported that about 3% of Bentley's population were Aboriginal.

In 1830, the land – including the future St James – was granted to James McDermott, and changed hands several times over the next five decades before being subdivided in 1885.

The area got its name from John Bentley (1822–1871), a Crimean War veteran, who arrived in Western Australia as a Pensioner Guard, and from 1862 until 1864 supervised convicts building Albany Road, later renamed to Albany Highway. A large camp for the road workers was established in what is now St James, which became known as Bentley Hill, while the surrounding, lower-lying areas became known simply as Bentley.

In the 1880s, a dairy was established at Canningford House near the present-day intersection of Albany Highway and Leach Highway by Fred and Harry Liddelow, and in 1905 a piggery was established opposite.

In the 1940s, the State Housing Commission commenced urban residential development in the area. Housing was also provided by the government to reward former military servicemen for their efforts during the Second World War. Some of these modest war service homes remain today, a few are still occupied by ageing veterans. In 1960–1961, two large retirement housing complexes, Bentley Park (formerly Swan Cottage Homes) and Rowethorpe Homes, were built in the suburb's west and Western Australian Institute of Technology (WAIT), later Curtin University, was opened in 1967.

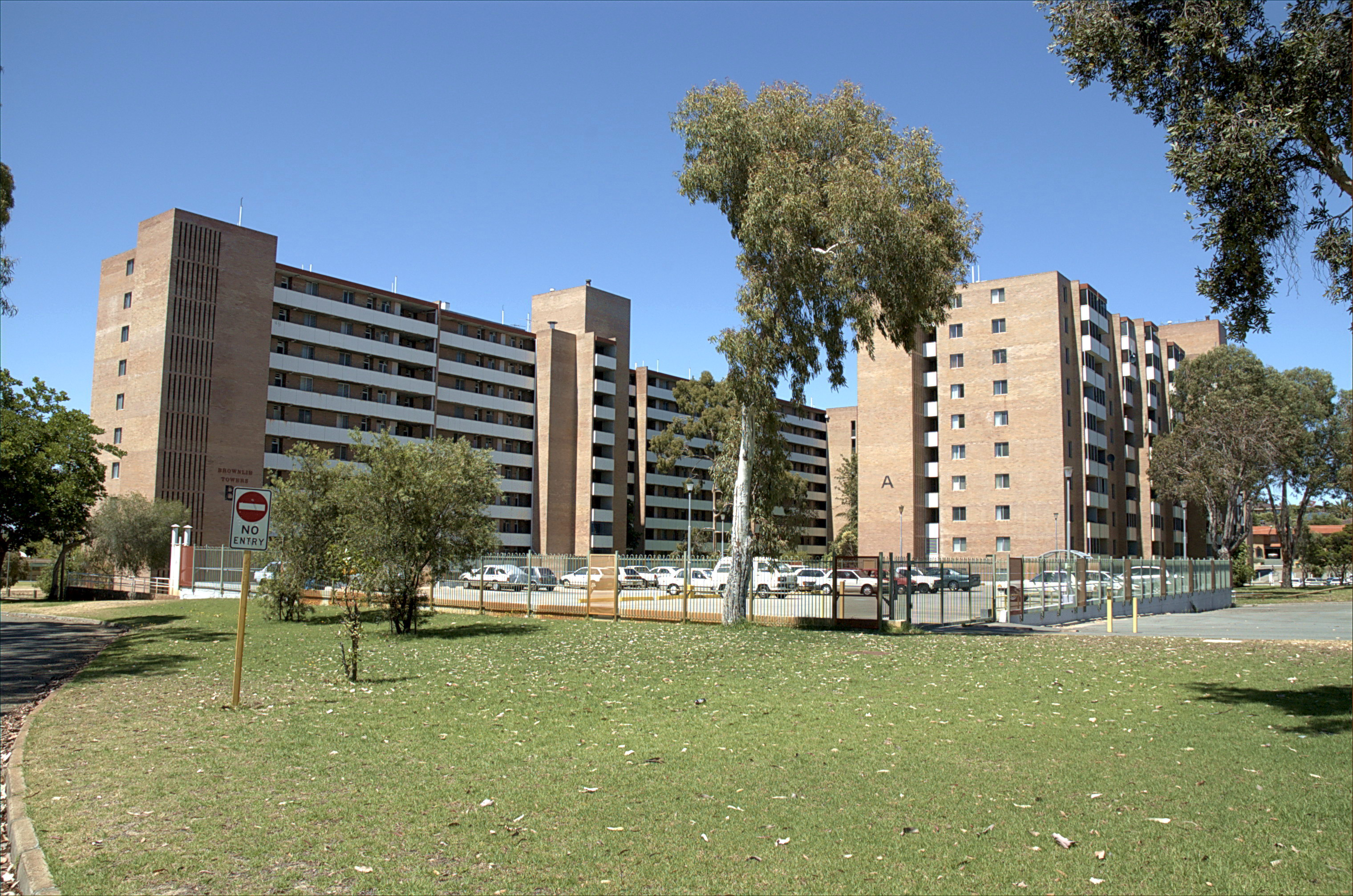
Brownlie Towers A and B block in Bentley

In 1969–1970, the Brownlie Towers precinct was created – the main feature of which were the twin 10-storey Brownlie Towers. Also included in the precinct were a smaller two-storey apartment complex, 104 two-storey townhouses and 20 single detached houses. Complete with a school, community centre, shopping area, swimming pool and sports facilities and linked to public transport, it was initially championed as a triumph of community building and innovative design by the State Housing Commission. However, social problems developed on and around the site, in part due to high vacancy rates and the public accessibility of the main towers. In 2002, the Government added the precinct to its New Living refurbishment program, which commenced at Brownlie Towers in 2004. Ultimately, the towers were demolished in 2019 to make way for the Bentley 360 residential development.

The Western Australian Technology Park was established opposite WAIT in 1985, and expanded in the 1990s. Over 90 companies, government departments and research groups with over 2,500 employees across a range of technological and scientific fields opened offices and research facilities at the park. It claims to contribute, as of September 2005, over A$2 billion, equivalent to A$3.07 billion in 2022, per annum to the Western Australian economy.

== Population ==
In the 2016 Census, there were 8,782 people in Bentley. 33.6% of people were born in Australia. The next most common countries of birth were Malaysia 6.9%, China 6.3%, India 5.3%, England 4.1% and Indonesia 3.4%. 42.3% of people only spoke English at home. Other languages spoken at home included Mandarin 10.9%, Indonesian 3.5%, Cantonese 2.8%, Punjabi 1.8% and Other Southern Asian Languages 1.6%. The most common responses for religion were No Religion 25.2% and Catholic 15.6%.

== Geography ==
Bentley is bounded by Kent Street to the west, Manning Road and Burton/Mills Streets to the south, Jarrah Road, Holder, Coolgardie and Tate Streets to the north and the Armadale railway line to the northeast. The section east of Albany Highway is largely commercial and industrial, while the area to the west bounded by Jarrah Road, Marquis Street, Cunning Road and Kent Street is dominated by environmental and cow grazing facilities. The rest is almost entirely residential.

== Senior and tertiary education ==
Bentley contains a university, further education colleges and a senior high school.

- Curtin University
- Morling College
- South Metropolitan TAFE
- Canning College

The presence of Curtin University, Canning College (originally Bentley High School, built in 1960 and reopened in 1982 as a college supporting adults returning to education, one of only four in the state) and the Bentley campus of Polytechnic West has attracted large numbers of fee-paying international students to the area, many of whom live in the suburb or in nearby parts of East Victoria Park, St James, Karawara and Waterford. In 2001 the ABS reported that 25% of Bentley's population are from East or South-East Asia.

== Facilities ==
Bentley is an established suburb with schools, restaurants, a shopping centre known as Bentley Plaza (formerly La Plaza Bentley and then the Bentley Centre) which was opened in 1969, the Bentley Hospital, and a large retirement housing complex (Rowethorpe and SwanCare). Although it is predominantly a residential suburb, Bentley has a retail and light-industrial component in the areas adjacent to Albany Highway. It also contains the Boronia Pre-release Centre for Women, a minimum-security prison.

== Transport ==
The suburb is served by a range of bus services, including the CircleRoute from Oats Street railway station and the Transperth 34 and 72 bus routes between Perth City and Cannington interchange. These services are operated by the Public Transport Authority.

=== Bus ===
==== Bus stations ====
- Curtin Central Bus Station
- Curtin University Bus Station

==== Bus routes ====
- 30 Curtin University Bus Station to Perth Busport – serves Hayman Road, Lawson Road and Manning Road
- 33 Curtin Central Bus Station to Elizabeth Quay Bus Station – serves Hayman Road
- 34 Cannington Station to Perth Busport – serves Albany Highway, Ashburton Street, Pollock Street, Walpole Street, Holder Street, Hayman Road, Curtin University Bus Station, Kent Street and Curtin Central Bus Station
- 72 Elizabeth Quay Bus Station to Cannington Station – serves Jarrah Road, Adie Court, Curtin University Bus Station, Hayman Road, Lawson Street and Manning Road
- 73 Elizabeth Quay Bus Station to Ranford Road Station – serves Jarrah Road, Adie Court, Curtin University Bus Station, Hayman Road and Lawson Street
- 100 Cannington Station to Canning Bridge Station – serves Manning Road, Lawson Street, Hayman Road, Curtin University Bus Station, Curtin Central Bus Station and Kent Street
- 101 Curtin Central Bus Station to Canning Bridge Station – serves Kent Street, Hayman Road, Curtin University Bus Station, Lawson Street, Manning Road
- 177 Elizabeth Quay Bus Station to Cannington Station – serves Chapman Road, Wyong Road and Manning Road
- 178 and 179 Elizabeth Quay Bus Station to Bull Creek Station – serve Walpole Street and Dumond Street
- 200 Cannington Station to Bull Creek Station – serves Manning Road
- 220 Perth Busport to Armadale Station – serves Albany Highway
- 222 Curtin University Bus Station to Cannington Station – serves Adie Court, Jarrah Road, Hill View Terrace, Holder Street, Walpole Street, Ashburton Street, Albany Highway and Mills Street
- 284 Curtin University Bus Station to Belmont Forum – serves Adie Court, Jarrah Road, Kent Street, Curtin Central Bus Station and Hayman Road
- 930 Elizabeth Quay Bus Station to Thornlie Station (high frequency) – serves Albany Highway
- 960 Curtin Central Bus Station to Mirrabooka Bus Station (high frequency) – serves Hayman Road, Curtin Central Bus Station and Kent Street
- 998 Fremantle Station to Fremantle Station (limited stops) – CircleRoute clockwise, serves Jarrah Road, Adie Court, Curtin University Bus Station, Hayman Road, Lawson Street
- 999 Fremantle Station to Fremantle Station (limited stops) – CircleRoute anti-clockwise, serves Lawson Street, Hayman Road, Curtin University Bus Station, Adie Court and Jarrah Road

== Politics ==
Bentley is a mixed-class suburb which consistently favours the Australian Labor Party at both federal and state elections. The strongest results for Labor are recorded at the Bentley Community Centre booth adjacent to the former Brownlie Towers.

2004 federal election
Labor	48%
Liberal	38%
Greens	6.6%
CDP	2.3%
One Nation	1.6%

2005 state election
Labor	55%
Liberal	31%
Greens	5.9%
CDP	3.9%
One Nation	1.9%

2001 federal election
Labor	50%
Liberal	35%
Democrats	4.5%
Greens	4.2%
One Nation	3.6%

2001 state election
Labor	56%
Liberal	25%
One Nation	7.0%
Greens	5.0%
Democrats	3.1%
