= Elizabeth Quay bus station =

Bus station in Perth, Western Australia

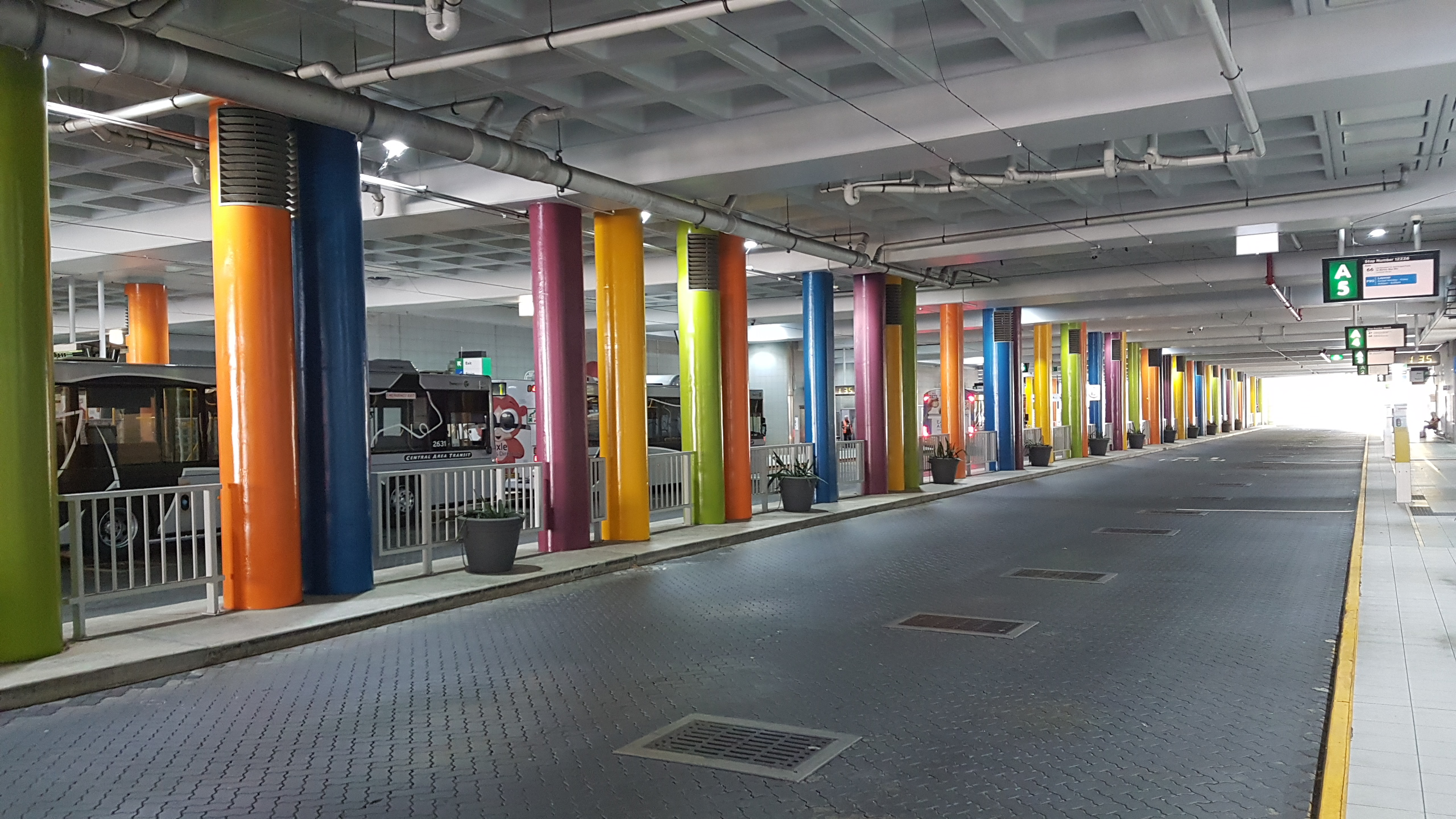

General information
- Location: Mounts Bay Road, Perth; Western Australia; Australia
- Coordinates: 31°57′22″S 115°51′17″E
- Owner: Public Transport Authority
- Operator: Transperth
- Bus routes: 41
- Bus stands: 35
- Connections: Train transfer at Elizabeth Quay

Other information
- Fare zone: 1 /

History
- Opened: 30 November 1991
- Former names: City Busport (1991–2004); Esplanade Busport (2004–2016)
Location

Elizabeth Quay bus station, formerly the Esplanade Busport, is a Transperth bus station, located at the southern edge of the Perth CBD in Western Australia, next to the Perth Convention Exhibition Centre and Elizabeth Quay railway station. It has 35 stands and is served by 55 Transperth routes operated by Path Transit, Swan Transit and Transdev WA. It is also served by South West Coach Lines services.

== Description ==
Elizabeth Quay bus station is located west of Elizabeth Quay railway station, adjacent to Mounts Bay Road, the Perth Convention Exhibition Centre, and the Ernst & Young Building. There are bus access points to the north-west (Mounts Bay Road and Mills Street), north (Mounts Bay Road westbound, entry only), and south-east (Kwinana Freeway ramps and William Street). The passenger entrances are at the north and south ends of the upper level concourse, and there are multiple pedestrian bridges connecting the bus station to the buildings north of Mounts Bay Road. The concourse sits above five ground-level platforms, which are labelled A to E. Each platform has seven stands, identified by the platform letter and a digit (1 to 7). Buses servicing the northernmost Platform A run west to east along the platform (stand A1 to stand A7), while buses for the other platforms travel from east to west (stands 7 to 1 for each platform).

== History ==
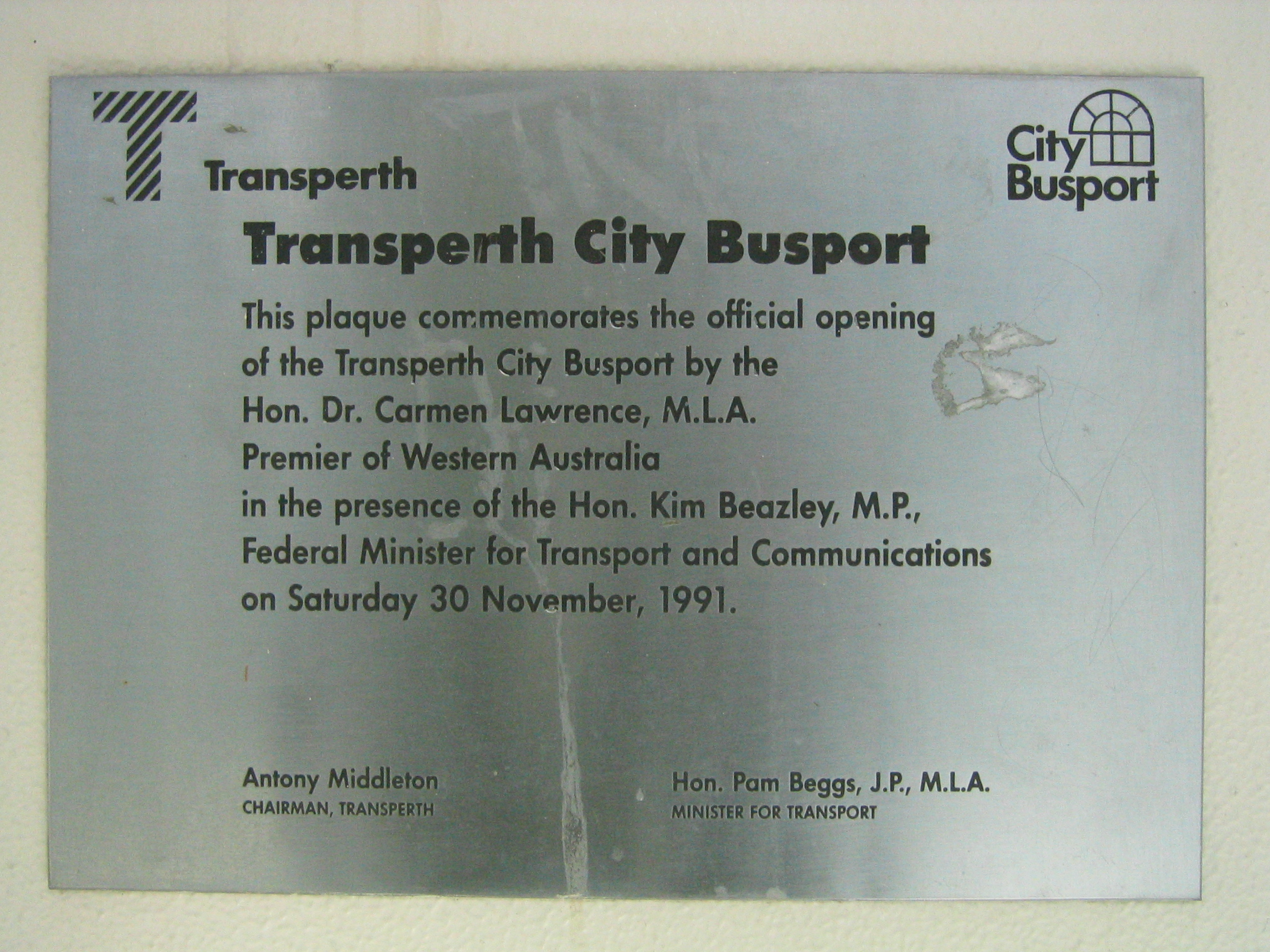
Opening plaque, 30 November 1991

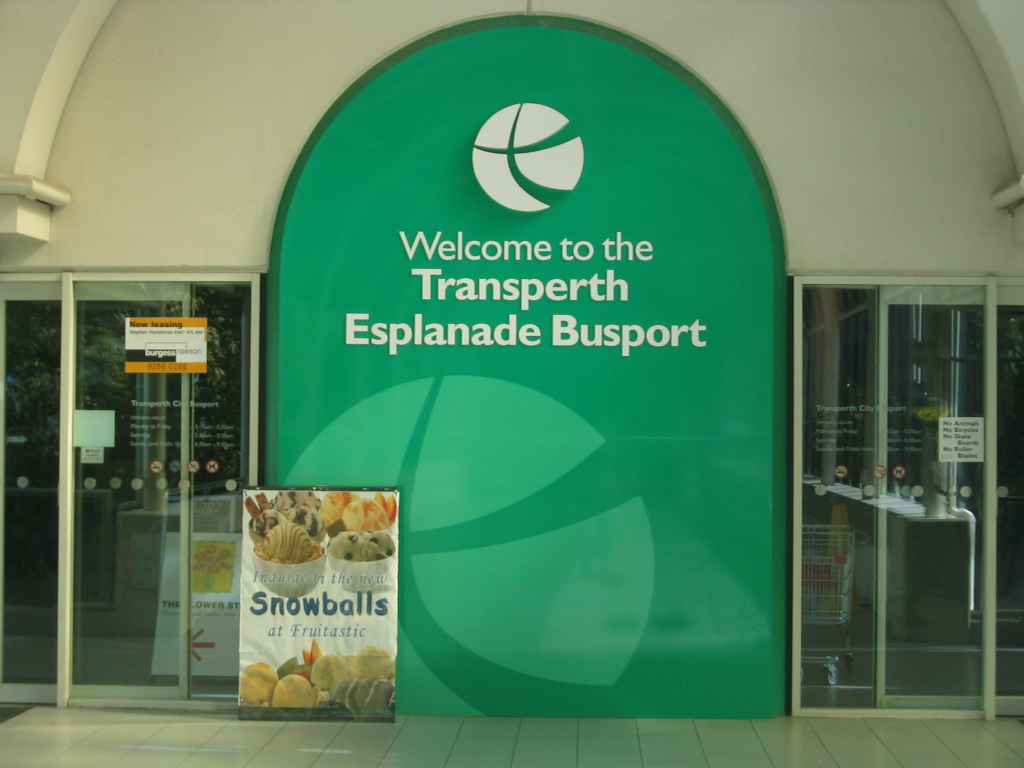
The bus station was previously named Esplanade Busport.

A bus station on The Esplanade, between Barrack Street and William Street, was suggested in 1974 by the Perth Central Design Co-ordinating Committee, to complement the recently-opened Wellington Street bus station on the CBD's northern side.

Elizabeth Quay bus station was opened as City Busport on 30 November 1991 by Premier Carmen Lawrence. It was renamed Esplanade Busport in September 2004. On 31 January 2016, Esplanade Busport and Esplanade railway station were renamed to Elizabeth Quay bus station and Elizabeth Quay railway station. The renaming was controversial; the estimated cost was $700,000, at a time when the state government was running a significant budget deficit.

In September 2024, Elizabeth Quay bus station became the first station on the Transperth network to have electric bus charging infrastructure installed.

== Bus routes ==
Many bus services start and terminate at the Elizabeth Quay Bus Station:

=== Platform A ===
Stop	Route	Destination / description	Notes
Stand A1	35	to The Old Mill, South Perth via Kwinana Freeway & Mill Point Road	
Stand A1	900	Ferry replacement service to South Perth	
Stand A2	30	to Curtin University bus station via Labouchere Road, Robert Street, Salter Point, Hope Avenue & Manning Road	
Stand A2	31	to Salter Point via Labouchere Road, Talbot Avenue, Canavan Crescent & Marsh Avenue	
Stand A3	34	to Cannington station via Angelo Street, Murray Street, Gillon Street, Curtin Central, Curtin University bus station, Ashburton Street & Bentley Plaza	
Stand A4	40	to Galleria bus station via Lord Street, Guildford Road, Bayswater station, Langley Road & Embleton	
Stand A4	41	to Bayswater Station via Lord Street, Eighth Avenue, Caledonian Avenue, Stone Street, Frington Street & King William Street	
Stand A4	42	to Maylands via Lord Street, Eighth Avenue & Peninsula Road	
Stand A4	43	to Maylands via Lord Street, Central Avenue & Peninsula Road	
Stand A5			Set down only
Stand A6	950	to Morley Station via Beaufort Street & Galleria bus station	High frequency
Stand A6	950X	to Morley Station via Beaufort Street & Galleria bus station	Limited Stops
Stand A7	980	to Galleria bus station via William Street, North Street, Dundas Road & Walter Road West	High frequency

=== Platform B ===
Stop	Route	Destination / description	Notes
Stand B1	23	to Claremont station via Mounts Bay Road, University of Western Australia, Bruce Street, Dalkeith, Beatrice Road & Victoria Avenue	
Stand B1	950	to University of Western Australia via Mounts Bay Road	High frequency
Stand B1	995	to Claremont Station via Mounts Bay Road & Stirling Highway	
Stand B2			Overflow stand
Stand B3	103	to Claremont station via Kings Park Road, Thomas Street, Hampden Road & Stirling Highway	
Stand B4	23	to Claremont station via Mounts Bay Road, University of Western Australia, Bruce Street, Dalkeith, Beatrice Road & Victoria Avenue	
Stand B4	995	to Claremont Station via Mounts Bay Road & Stirling Highway	
Stand B5	6 Purple CAT	University of Western Australia South via Thomas Road	
Stand B6	950	to QEII Medical Centre via Mounts Bay Road, University of Western Australia & Hampden Road	High frequency
Stand B6	950X	to QEII Medical Centre via Mounts Bay Road, University of Western Australia & Hampden Road	Limited Stops
Stand B7			

=== Platform C ===
Stop	Route	Destination / description	Notes
Stand C1	30, 31, 34	to Perth Busport	
Stand C2	160	to Fremantle station via Kwinana Freeway, Canning Bridge station, Booragoon bus station, Willagee, Oldham Crescent & South Street	
Stand C3	114	to Lake Coogee via Kwinana Freeway, Canning Bridge station, Booragoon bus station, Marmion Street, Carrington Street, Hamilton Hill & Marvel Avenue	
Stand C3	115	to Hamilton Hill via Kwinana Freeway, Canning Bridge station, Booragoon bus station, Jackson Avenue, Kardinya & Coolbellup	
Stand C4	111	to Fremantle station via Kwinana Freeway, Canning Bridge station, Canning Highway & East Fremantle	
Stand C4	158	to Fremantle station via Kwinana Freeway, Canning Bridge station, Applecross, Attadale, Bicton & East Fremantle	
Stand C5	1 Blue CAT	to Perth Busport via Barrack Street, Barrack Street, & Aberdeen Street	
Stand C6	5 Green CAT	to Leederville via Colin Street & City West station	
Stand C6	691	to Crown Perth, Burswood	CAT layover, Overflow stand
Stand C7	1 Blue CAT	to Kings Park via Malcolm Street	

=== Platform D (St George Tce Service Bound) ===
Stop	Route	Destination / description	Notes
Stand D1	111, 160	to WACA Ground via St Georges Terrace	East Perth services
Stand D2	930	to Thornlie station via Shepperton Road, Albany Highway, Westfield Carousel, and Spencer Road	High frequency
Stand D3	282	to Kalamunda bus station via Shepperton Road, Oats Street station, Welshpool Road, Gladys Road, Grove Road & Canning Road	
Stand D3	283	to Kalamunda bus station via Shepperton Road, Oats Street station, Welshpool Road, Crystal Brook Road, Lesmurdie Road & Canning Road	
Stand D4	39	to Redcliffe via Star Street, Oats Street, Belmont Avenue, Belmont Forum & Orpington Street	
Stand D5	270	to High Wycombe Station via Great Eastern Highway, Belmont Avenue, Belmont Forum, Hale Road, Hawtin Road & Maida Vale Road	
Stand D6	940	to Redcliffe Station via Great Eastern Highway	
Stand D7			
All Stands D2 – D7 services are to various destinations via Mill Street and St Georges Terrace

=== Platform E (St George Tce Service Bound) ===
Stop	Route	Destination / description	Notes
Stand E1	177	to Cannington Station via Victoria Park transfer station, Berwick Street, St James, Chapman Road & Bentley	
Stand E1	178	to Bull Creek station via Victoria Park transfer station, Berwick Street, Wilson, Leach Highway, Shelley & Rossmoyne	
Stand E1	179	to Bull Creek station via Victoria Park transfer station, Berwick Street, Wilson, Riverton, High Road & Leach Highway	
Stand E2	72	to Cannington station via Victoria Park transfer station, Curtin University bus station, Wilson & Leach Highway	
Stand E2	75	to Canning Vale via Victoria Park transfer station, Curtin University bus station, Wilson, Riverton, Parkwood & Bannister Road	
Stand E3	32	to Como via The Causeway, Mill Point Road & Coode Street	
Stand E3	33	to Karawara via The Causeway, Lansdowne Road, Kensington, Hayman Road, Curtin Central & Walana Drive	
Stand E4	909	Rail replacement service to Mandurah Station	Bus layover
Stand E5			Overflow stand
Stand E6	909	Rail replacement service to Perth Station	
Stand E7		South West Coach Lines services to Perth Airport and various south-western destinations	
Stand E7		Taxi stand	

== Accidents and incidents ==
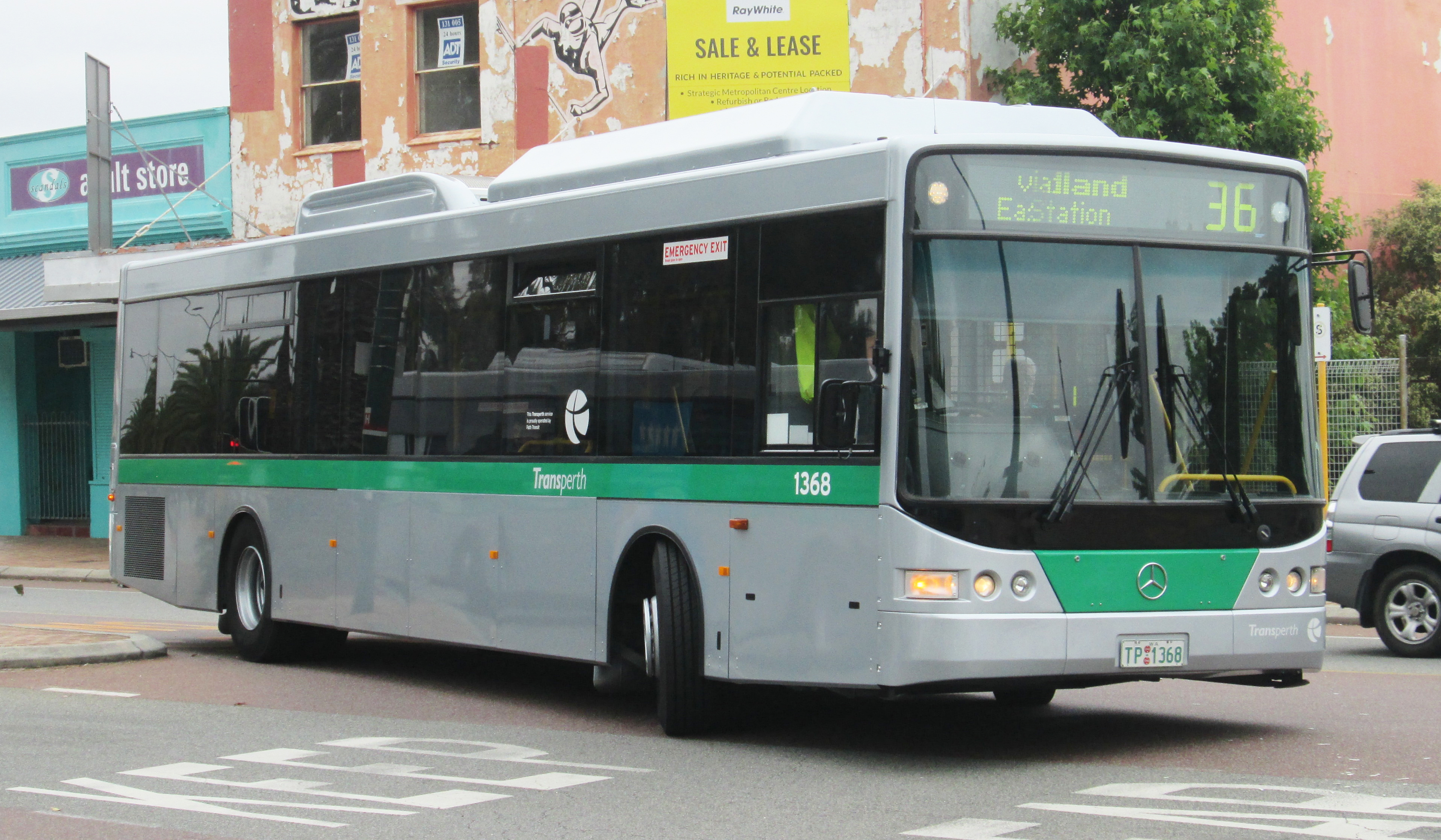
A Mercedes-Benz OC500LE similar to the one involved in the incident

On 15 July 2015, a gas-fuelled Mercedes-Benz OC 500 LE caught fire whilst stationary in the 4th lane (more commonly known as lane D). During the fire, the building above the Busport was evacuated as a safety precaution. No-one was injured and it was said that the fire was caused by a coolant leak. The bus cost an estimated $750,000 and was completely destroyed in the fire.

== Gallery ==
Elizabeth Quay Bus Station
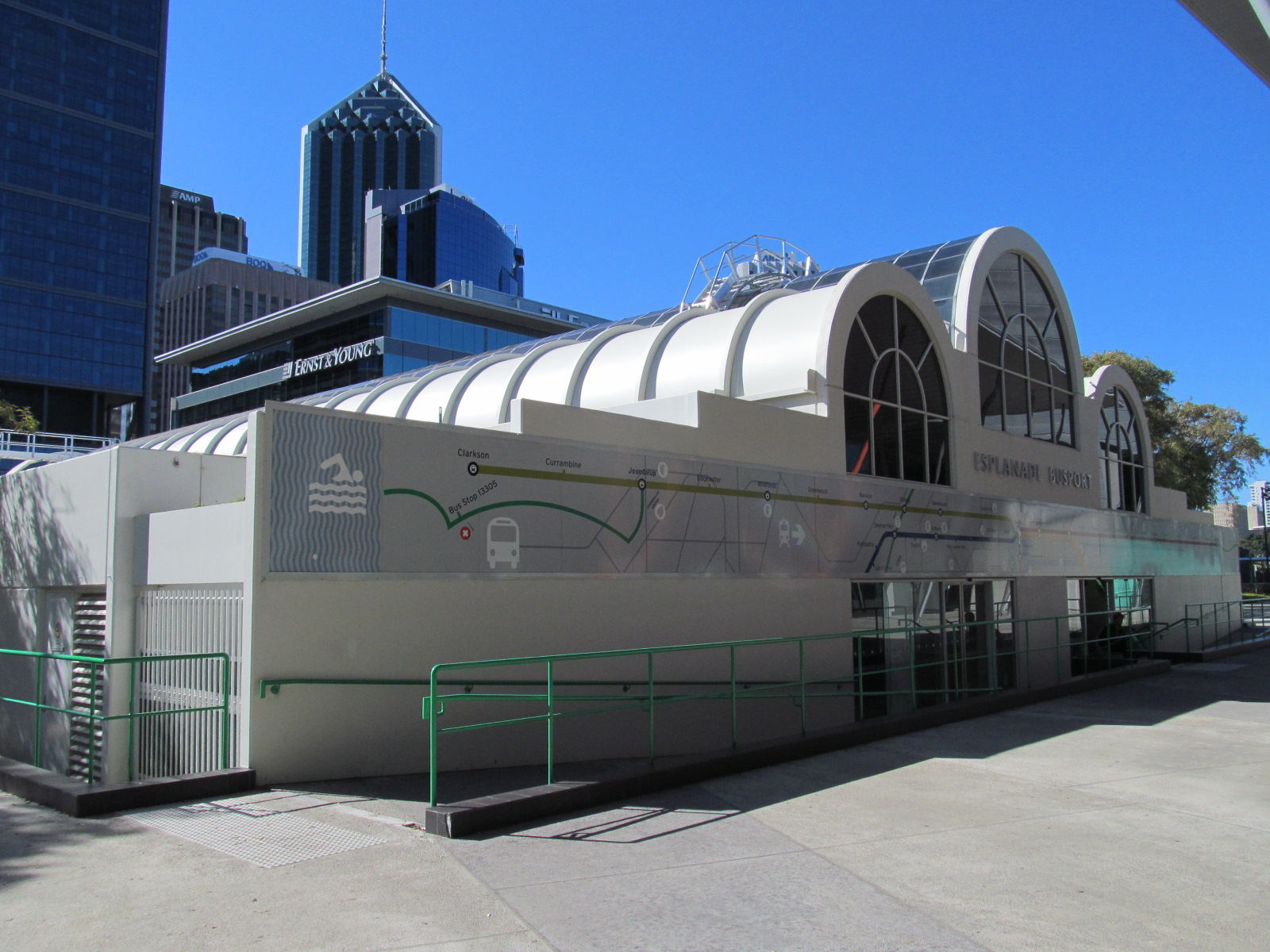
View from SW

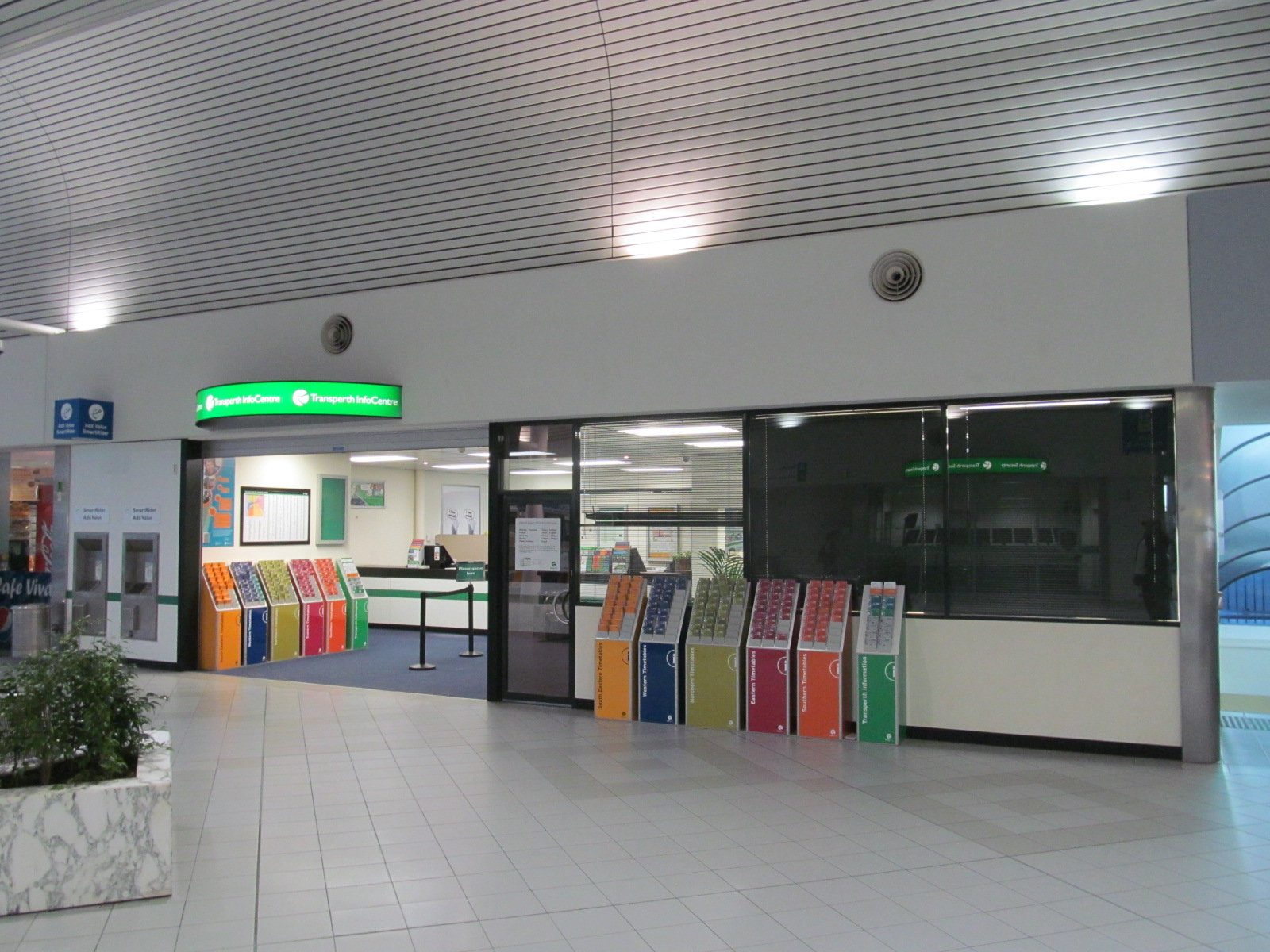
Information centre

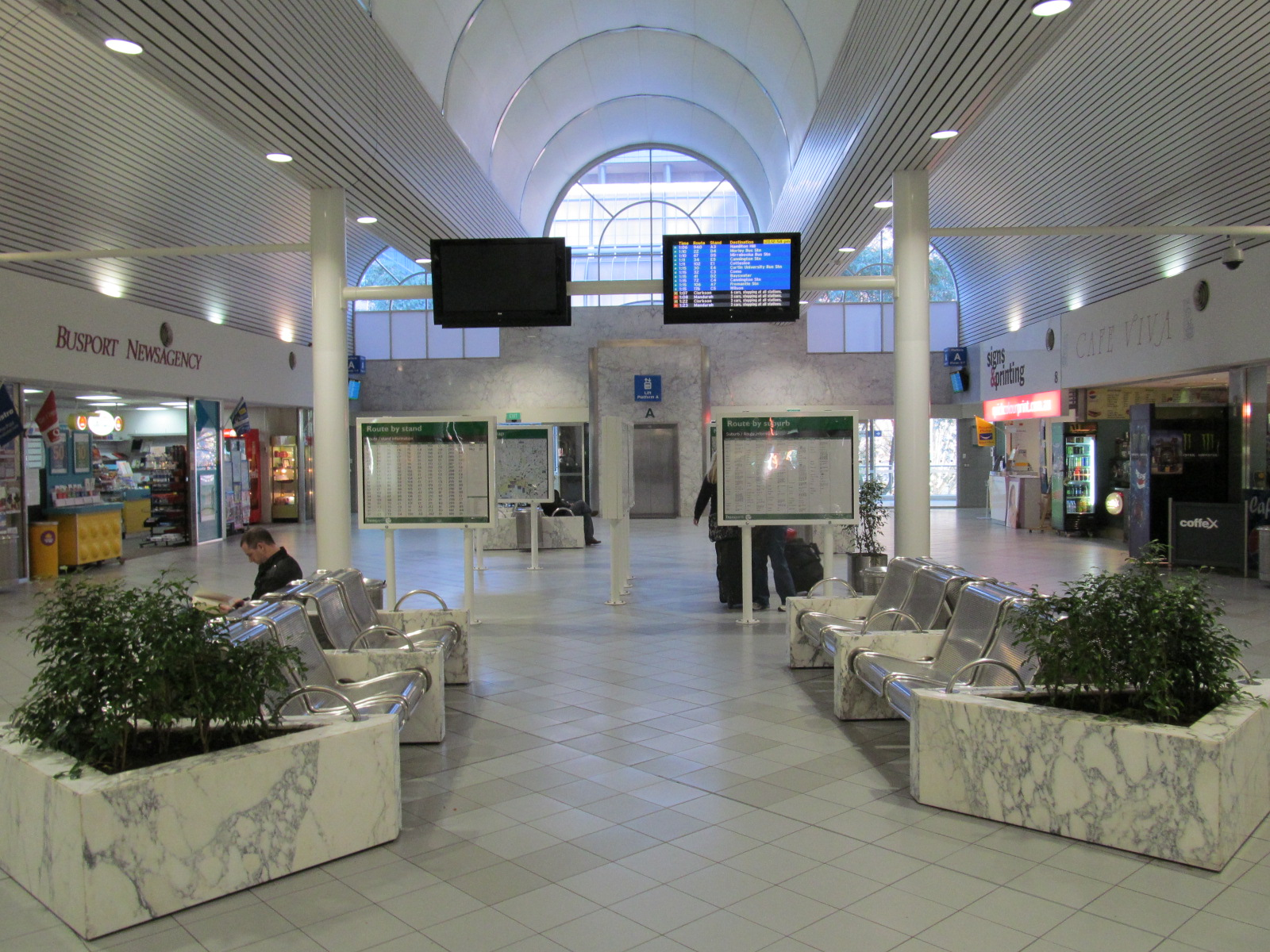
Interior

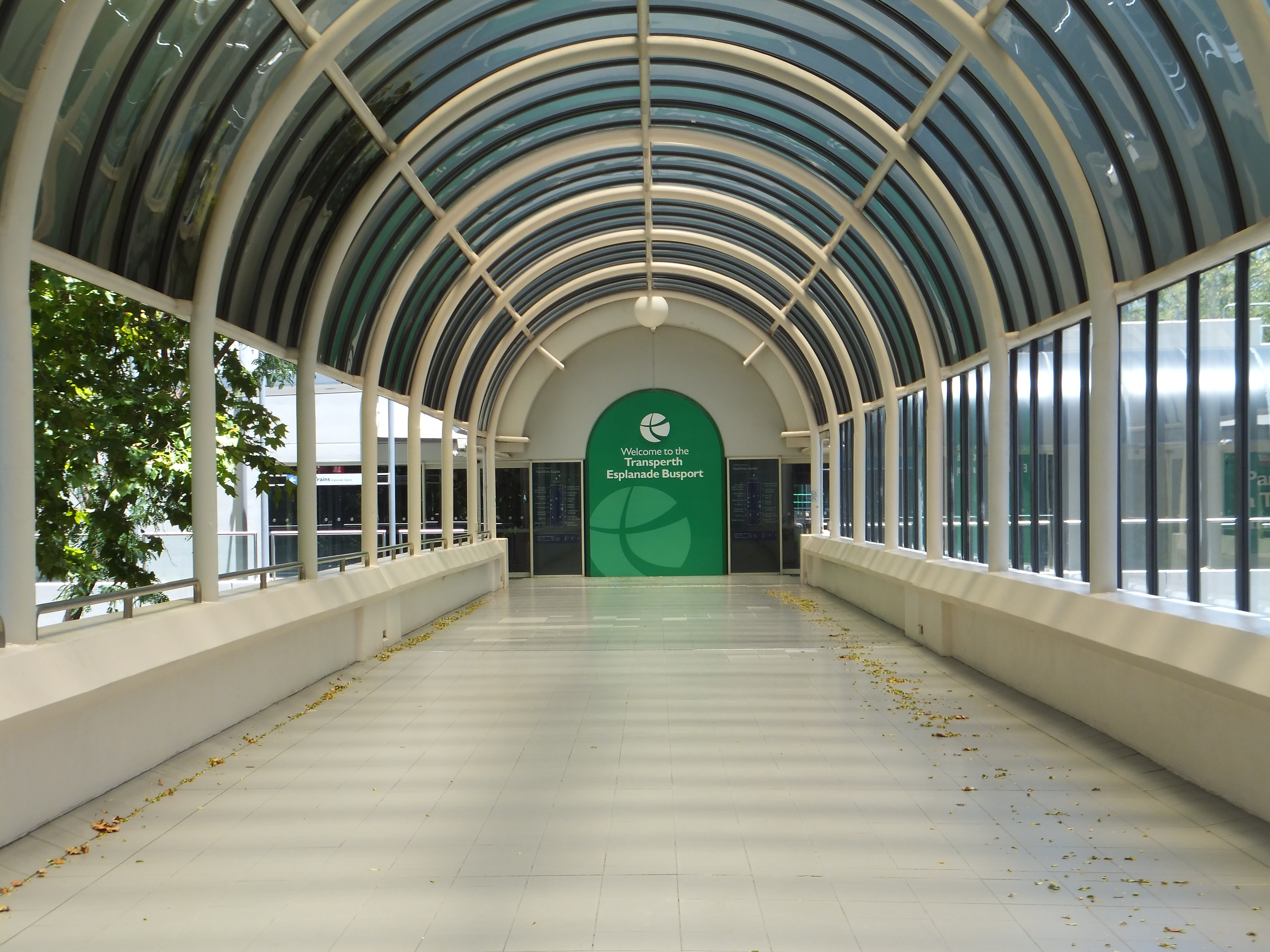
Busport walkway
