= Cannington =

Cannington may refer to:

- Cannington, Somerset
- Cannington, Ontario, a village
- Cannington, Western Australia, a suburb of Perth
- Cannington, Queensland, a mining location
- Cannington Manor Provincial Park, a provincial park in Saskatchewan, Canada
- Cannington Lake, a community in Saskatchewan
- Cannington Lake (Saskatchewan), a lake in Saskatchewan
- Cannington (electoral district), an electorate of the Saskatchewan Legislative Assembly
- Electoral district of Cannington, an electorate of the Western Australian Legislative Assembly
- Civil Lines, Allahabad, a neighborhood, formerly known as Cannington
- Cannington Viaduct, in Devon near Lyme Regis in Dorset

== See also ==
- Kennington (disambiguation)
