= Ashley Thorpe =

Australian cricketer (born 1975)

Personal information
- Full name: Ashley Michael Thorpe
- Born: 2 April 1975 (age 51); Kiama, New South Wales, Australia
- Nickname: Thorpedo, Boof, Beast
- Height: 1.80 m (5 ft 11 in)
- Batting: Left-handed
- Bowling: Right-arm medium
- Role: Batsman

Domestic team information
- Years: Team
- 2002–2003: Durham
- FC debut: 7 May 2002 Durham v Sri Lankans
- Last FC: 3 September 2003 Durham v Northants
- LA debut: 11 August 2002 Durham v Leicestershire
- Last LA: 7 September 2003 Durham v Northants

Career statistics
Competition	FC	LA	T20
Matches	9	11	5
Runs scored	321	243	79
Batting average	20.06	22.09	26.33
100s/50s	0/2	0/2	0/0
Top score	95	76	35*
Balls bowled	48	132	30
Wickets	0	2	4
Bowling average	–	74.50	8.25
5 wickets in innings	–	0	0
10 wickets in match	–	0	0
Best bowling	–	2/49	3/20
Catches/stumpings	5/–	5/–	1/–
- Source: CricketArchive, 14 October 2011

Ashley Michael Thorpe (born 2 April 1975) is an Australian former professional cricketer. He played as a left-handed batsman and right-arm medium-pace bowler for Durham County Cricket Club. He was born in Kiama, New South Wales but attended Kent Street Senior High School in Perth, Western Australia as part of their Specialist Cricket Program.

Thorpe, who began his career playing for Scarborough Cricket Club, represented Western Australia at Under 17 and Under 19 level. He moved to the United Kingdom in 1997 and made his mark in the North East Premier League First Division for Chester-le-Street. He trialled for a single match for Durham's Second XI during the 2001 season scoring 145 and 85 against Yorkshire Second XI, and made his debut for the first team in 2002, against a Sri Lankan touring team.

Despite his County Championship debut match ending in a heavy defeat at the hands of Glamorgan, Thorpe played six further matches during the season, none of which ended in victory.

Out of favour as a middle-order batsman in the following season, Thorpe played just two further first-class matches in 2003.

Having left Chester-le-Street and Durham County Cricket Club at the end of 2003, Thorpe was a club professional for Whitburn Cricket Club until 2008, when he joined Sunderland and later, Washington Cricket Club, where he remains as a respected player-coach.

Specialising in batting, he has been used by Durham to develop their young cricketers.

Thorpe now works for Durham Cricket as Head Coach of their Cricket Development Centre in partnership with Park View Academy of Sport. He is also a freelance commentator who often works for BBC Radio Newcastle covering Durham Cricket games.
