= List of ships named Kensington =

A number of ships have been named Kensington after one or more of the places of that name, including the following:

== Naval vessels ==
- USS Kensington (1861), a wooden, sailing vessel purchased by the US Navy for the Stone Fleet of blockships
- USS Kensington (1862), a merchant steamer built in 1858 and purchased by the US Navy during the Civil War; she was sold in 1865, and sank in collision in 1871
- HMT Kensington (1914), an armed trawler, built in 1900 and in service during World War I

== Merchant ships ==
- Kensington (1891), a British full-rigged sailing ship, built by Russell & Co at Greenock; later with Russian and Finnish owners, she was broken up in 1924
- SS Kensington (1893), an American-owned, British-flagged Transatlantic passenger liner that was scrapped in 1910
- SS Kensington (1895), a British cargo vessel, built by Palmer's at Jarrow as Knight Errant and scrapped in 1910
- SS Kensington (1903), an American Great Lakes bulk carrier, built at Toledo; she was later named M. A. Reeb, then O. S. McFarland, and scrapped in 1972

=== Also ===
- SS Kensington Court (1927), a British cargo vessel, built by Napier & Miller on the River Clyde for Court Line; she was sunk by submarine torpedo in the North Atlantic on 18 September 1939
- Old Kensington (1874), a British iron-hulled full-rigged sailing ship, built by Potter & Hodgkinson at Liverpool; sold to Germany in 1900 as Christel and scrapped in 1910
