= Curtin University bus station =

Bus station in Perth, Western Australia

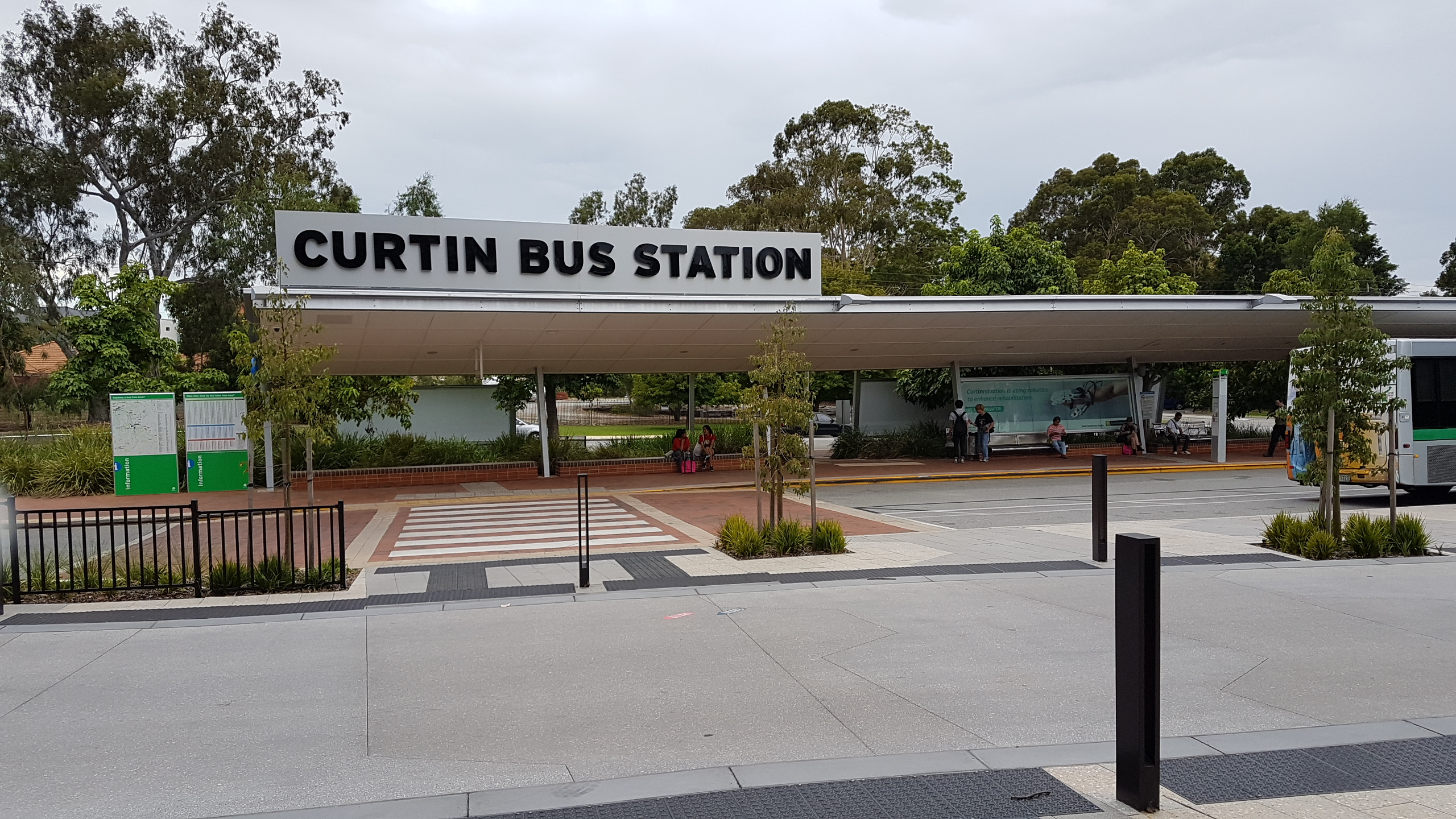

General information
- Location: Hayman Road, Bentley, Western Australia; Australia
- Coordinates: 32°00′22″S 115°53′51″E
- Owner: Public Transport Authority
- Operator: Transperth
- Bus routes: 10
- Bus stands: 9

Other information
- Fare zone: 1

History
- Opened: 17 November 1999
Location

Curtin University bus station is a Transperth bus station located at Curtin University's Bentley campus. It has eight stands and is served by 11 Transperth routes operated by Path Transit, Swan Transit and Transdev WA.

== History ==
Curtin University bus station opened on 17 November 1999.

== Bus routes ==
Stop	Route	Destination / description	Notes
Stand 1	998	CircleRoute to Fremantle station via Southlands & Murdoch station/University	Limited stops
Stand 2	30	to Perth Busport via Curtin Central, Manning, Salter Point & Elizabeth Quay Bus Station	
Stand 2	101	to Canning Bridge station via Lawson Street	
Stand 3	34	to Cannington station via Ashburton Street & Bentley Plaza	
Stand 3	222	to Cannington station via Bentley Plaza	
Stand 4	72	to Cannington station via Bungaree Road & Manning Road	
Stand 4	73	to Ranford Road Station via Riverton	
Stand 4	100	to Cannington station via Manning Road	
Stand 5	34	to Perth Busport via Karawara, Manning, Como South Perth & Elizabeth Quay bus station	
Stand 5	100	to Canning Bridge station via Kent Street	
Stand 6	72, 73	to Elizabeth Quay Bus Station via Berwick Street	
Stand 6	657	to Perth Stadium Bus Station	Special Event Services
Stand 7	960	to Mirrabooka bus station via Curtin Central, Perth Busport, Edith Cowan University Mount Lawley, & Alexander Drive	High frequency
Stand 8	284	to Belmont via Victoria Park & Carlisle station	
Stand 8	999	CircleRoute to Galleria Bus Station via Oats Street station & Belmont	Limited stops
Stand 9	101	to Curtin Central Bus Station via University Boulevard	
