= Kensington, Western Australia =

Kensington
- Suburb
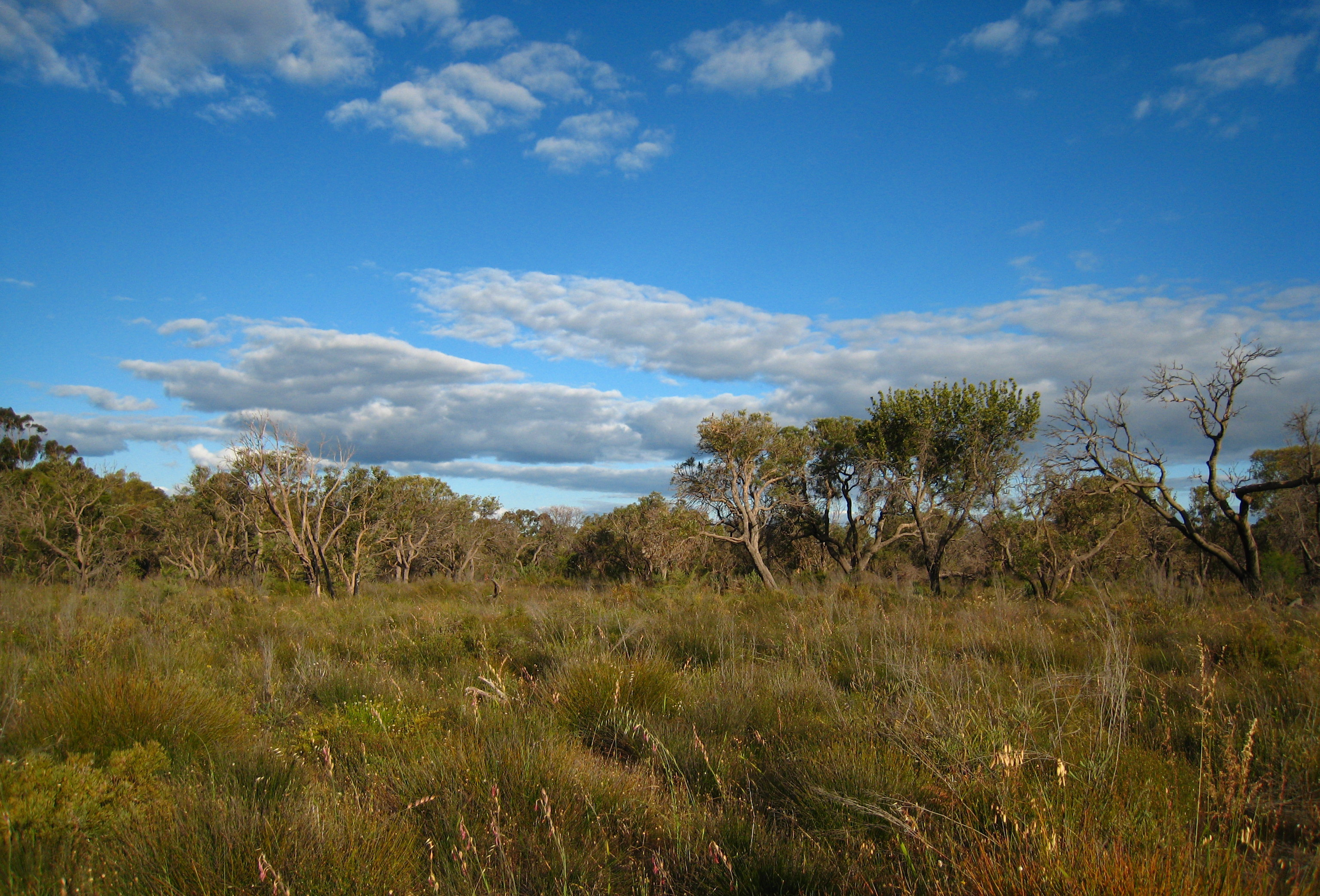
- Kensington Bushland
- Interactive map of Kensington
- Coordinates: 31.9825°S 115.884444°E
- Country: Australia
- State: Western Australia
- City: Perth
- LGAs: City of South Perth; Town of Victoria Park
- Location: 3 km (1.9 mi) from Perth

Government
  - State electorate: South Perth, Victoria Park
  - Federal division: Swan

Area
  - Total: 2.5 km^{2} (0.97 sq mi)

Population
  - Total: 4,627 (SAL 2021)
- Postcode: 6151
Suburbs around Kensington
South Perth	South Perth	Swan River
South Perth	Kensington	Victoria Park
Como	Como	East Victoria Park

Kensington is a residential suburb 3 km from Perth's central business district. Kensington is located within the City of South Perth and Town of Victoria Park local government areas.

The suburb is bounded by Canning Highway to the west, Berwick Street to the north, Kent Street to the east, and Hayman Road and South Terrace to the south.

The suburb was named after the Kensington Park racecourse which, in turn, was most likely named after the prestigious London suburb of Kensington.

== Senior and tertiary education ==
Located within the borders of the suburb are Kensington Primary School, and Kent Street Senior High School, the official address of which is 74 Rathay Street, Kensington.

== Transport ==
=== Bus ===
- 33 Curtin Central Bus Station to Elizabeth Quay Bus Station – serves Hayman Road, George Street, Dyson Street, Bright Street, Seventh Avenue, Lansdowne Road and Second Avenue
- 34 Cannington Station to Perth Busport – serves South Terrace
- 284 Curtin University Bus Station to Belmont Forum – serves Kent Street, Hayman Road and George Street
- 960 Curtin University Bus Station to Mirrabooka Bus Station (high frequency) – serves Kent Street

== See also ==
- Kensington Bushland Reserve
