= Kent Street Senior High School =

High school in East Victoria Park, Perth, Western Australia

- The administration block of Kent Street Senior High School

Location
- Kent Street; East Victoria Park; Perth, Western Australia; (officially, 74 Rathay Street; Kensington WA); Australia
- Coordinates: 31°59′8″S 115°53′34″E

Information
- Type: Public co-educational specialist high day and boarding school
- Motto: Courage to Achieve
- Established: 1940; 86 years ago
- Educational authority: WA Department of Education
- Principal: Kacey Single
- Enrolment: 1083 (2022)
- Campus: Suburban
- Area: 4 hectares (10 acres)
- Campus type: Urban
- Colours: Red, blue and white
- Website: www.kentstreetshs.wa.edu.au

Western Australia Heritage Register
- Type: State Registered Place
- Designated: 31 March 2006
- Reference no.: 3372

Kent Street Senior High School is a public co-educational specialist high day and boarding school in the Town of Victoria Park, located on Kent Street in East Victoria Park, a suburb of Perth, Western Australia. Its official address is 74 Rathay Street, in the adjacent suburb of Kensington.

Over 50 percent of students attending Kent Street Senior High School live in neighbouring or other school districts. This is largely due to the school's specialist programs of aeronautics, cricket, fashion and design, and Centre of Resources Excellence (CoRE).

== History ==
The Western Australian Parliament received many proposals for a high school to be situated south of the river through the 1920s but a lack of funds mostly due to the depression meant that the school did not eventuate. In 1932 a survey was conducted finding that 410 post-primary-age children were living in the South Perth and Victoria Park areas. Construction of the first building commenced in 1939 and the school commenced operations known as Kent Street Central School in 1940 with 354 students.

The buildings of the school are listed on the Western Australia Heritage Register and described as a complex of Inter-war Free Classical style brick and tile buildings and grounds. School teams have entered Australian 5 Highs Cricket Carnival, winning at Brisbane 1994, and at Melbourne 2000 and 2005. The school hosted the carnival in 1996, 2001 and 2006.

== Campus ==
The school is based primarily on its 4-hectare (10-acre) campus on Kent Street in East Victoria Park. The campus of the school is divided into three levels, because of the sloping hill on which it is positioned. The school has no breaking in age groups except for a Canteen Quad for lower-school students and an Upper School Quad for upper-school students.

== Aviation course ==
The school began to offer a course in aviation to Year 11 students in 1979. The first class comprised 27 students. In 1988 the course was opened for lower school students to enrol in. Fundraising was required to purchase some of the equipment required and Joan Terry, wife of the late Paul Terry, donated an aircraft hangar in 1994. By 2000 the school had developed a partnership with Edith Cowan University to promote aviation education in Western Australia. The aviation course was one of the courses trialled in the Courses of Study roll-out in 2004 and became a TEE (now ATAR) equivalent course.

In 2008, the school joined a partnership with Skywest Airlines (now a subsidy of Virgin Australia), a Western Australian-based regional airline. With this partnership, aviation students can now undertake work experience and Structured Workplace Learning (SWL) at Skywest Airlines, assisting Licensed Aircraft Maintenance Engineers (LAMEs) to undertake maintenance on Fokker 50 and Fokker 100 jet aircraft. In addition, upper school aviation students are able to undertake return flights with Virgin Australia pilots. Students work with the pilots to determine the weight and balance of the aircraft, decipher complex meteorological data and apply navigation principles relevant to these sophisticated jet aircraft.

== Rotary Residential College ==
The Rotary Residential College is on land leased from Kent Street Senior High School. The idea of the college was generated by the constant requests to metropolitan Rotary Clubs for accommodation for high school students wanting to study special courses only provided at city-based high schools. With the help of federal, state and local governments, the corporate sector and guided by some individual Rotary Clubs, this project has been operating since 1991.

Some 450 boarders have availed themselves of the accommodation and they have come from nearly 100 country towns.

== Notable alumni ==
- Zoe Arancini – Olympic water polo player
- Gregory Corbitt – field hockey player
- Bradd Dalziell – Australian rules football player with the Brisbane Lions 2008–2009, West Coast Eagles 2010–2013
- Michael Dighton – cricket player with the Western Warriors, Tasmanian Devils Football Club
- Max Duffy – Australian rules football player for the Fremantle Football Club 2013–2015; college American football player for the Kentucky Wildcats 2018–present
- Justin Eveson – Paralympic wheelchair basketball player
- Brian Glencross – hockey player and coach
- Glenys Godfrey – Member of the Western Australian Legislative Assembly for Belmont
- Milton Hook – Seventh-day Adventist historian
- Michael Jeffery AC, CVO, MC – Governor-General of Australia; Governor of Western Australia; Major General Australian Army
- Rebecca Judd – model, television presenter
- Iain MacLean – Member of the Western Australian Legislative Council for North Metropolitan, Member of the Western Australian Legislative Assembly for Wanneroo
- Rod Marsh MBE – Australian Test cricketer
- Chris Mayne – Australian rules football player for the Fremantle Football Club 2008–2016, Collingwood Football Club 2017–2021
- Laine McDonald – Member of the Western Australian Legislative Council for North Metropolitan
- Tendai Mzungu – Australian rules football player for the Fremantle Dockers 2011–2017
- Marcus North – cricket player with the Western Warriors
- Luke Pomersbach – cricket player with the Western Warriors
- Malcolm Poole – field hockey player
- Drew Porter – cricket player with the Western Warriors
- Luke Ronchi – cricket player with the Western Warriors
- Donald Smart – field hockey player
- Duncan Spencer – cricket player with the Kent County Cricket Club and the Western Warriors
- Matthew Swinbourn – Member of the Western Australian Legislative Council, Minister for the Environment; Community Services; Homelessness
- David Taylor – cricket player with the Derbyshire County Cricket Club and the Worcestershire County Cricket Club
- Ashley Thorpe – cricket player with the Durham County Cricket Club
- Andrew Vlahov – NBL, Perth Wildcats, Australian Boomers, 4-time Olympian
- Christine Wheeler AO, QC – Justice of the Supreme Court of Western Australia
- Shane Woewodin – Australian rules football player for the Melbourne Football Club and Collingwood Football Club; Brownlow Medalist in 2000
- Trevor Rowe - Australian businessman, currently a senior advisor to Rothschild & Co Australia.

== See also ==
- List of boarding schools in Australia
- List of schools in the Perth metropolitan area
