= Kensington, Gqeberha =

Kensington
- Location within Eastern Cape Location within South Africa
- Coordinates: 33.9416°S 25.5964°E
- Country: South Africa
- Province: Eastern Cape
- Municipality: Nelson Mandela Bay
- Main Place: Gqeberha

Government
  - Type: Metro Council

Area
  - Total: 0.56 km^{2} (0.22 sq mi)

Population (2011)
  - Total: 1,531
  - Density: 2,700/km^{2} (7,100/sq mi)

Racial makeup (2011)
  - Black African: 16.6%
  - Coloured: 41.4%
  - Indian/Asian: 1.9%
  - White: 35.9%
  - Other: 4.2%

First languages (2011)
  - Afrikaans: 55.6%
  - English: 25.8%
  - Xhosa: 11.4%
  - Other: 7.2%
- Time zone: UTC+2 (SAST)
- Postal code (street): n/a
- PO box: 6001
- Area code: 041

Kensington is an inner-city suburb of Gqeberha, Eastern Cape, South Africa.
