= Kensington Prairie Elementary School =

Kensington Prairie Elementary

Location
- 16824 32 Ave; Surrey, British Columbia, V3S 0L5; Canada; 49.0600°N 122.7554°W

Information
- School type: Public, Elementary school
- Established: 1887
- Closed: 2006
- School board: School District 36 Surrey
- School number: 3636006
- Grades: K-7
- Language: English

Kensington Prairie Elementary School was a public elementary school, situated in Surrey, British Columbia, Canada, that was part of School District 36 Surrey. It operated from 1887 until 2006. In June 2010, the Surrey City Council began restoration of the site as part of a plan to preserve the building and convert it into a Community Centre.

== History ==
Established in 1887, the original one-room schoolhouse stood at Kensington-Mud Bay Road (40th Avenue) and Coast Meridian (168th Street). The first teacher at the school was M.J. Matheson. Prior to this, students had attended school in the home of Tom Fallowfield on the northwest corner of Brown Road, now 32nd Avenue, and Coast Meridian Road. From 1887 until 1912, students graduating from Kensington Prairie had to travel to New Westminster to attend high school. That changed when the first secondary school was opened in Cloverdale

In 1914, a new school was built on the corner of Brown Road and Coast Meridian Road, due to the crowding of the original schoolhouse and the frequent flooding of the area. The school, with additions over the years, remained in use until 2006, when its students, and students from Grandview Elementary, moved to the new Pacific Heights Elementary

Students from the school were officially welcomed when they attended a meeting of the British Columbia Legislative Assembly on February 9, 1984.

The school was officially designated a City of Surrey Heritage Site on December 4, 2000.

The school was considered for closure in January 2003. A reason given was the claim that it was in poor condition. The threat of closure generated significant parental concern. On February 14, 2003, MLA Kevin Falcon, responding to the Throne speech, argued that the school should remain open. However, in June 2006 the school was shut down and replaced by Pacific Heights Elementary School. The new school was officially opened on November 15, 2006.

== Future of the site ==
A movement to promote the preservation of the historic Kensington Prairie School site as a community centre led to a community meeting held on May 29, 2006. Those attending voted unanimously for the following resolution: "That this meeting favours the preservation for community use of at least the historic 1914 building and the gym as well as the playground area of Kensington Prairie School." At this meeting the 'Society to Save the Kensington Prairie Site' was formed with the mission of working towards the goal of the resolution. The Society made a presentation to the Board of School Trustees of School District No. 36 on October 12, 2006. It was announced at a Citizen Advisory Committee meeting on March 8, 2007, that the future of the site was still undecided.

On February 25, 2008, The City of Surrey announced that it had acquired the school and its entire three-acre site as part of a land swap with the Surrey School Board. In September, 2008, Surrey Council voted to "Approve in principle the adaptive reuse of Kensington Prairie School... as a Community centre operated by the Parks, Recreation and Culture Department; and, further, voted to "Authorize staff to include as part of the 2009 budget, capital and operating funding to allow for the conversion of the School to a Community Centre."

In 2009 Surrey City Council approved the designation of the historic building on the site as a Protected Heritage Site, and announced plans to create a community centre on the site of the school. In November, 2009, it was announced that the Federal Government would give $200,000 towards renovation of the historic 1914 building.
