= Richard Kennington =

American philosopher

Richard H. Kennington
- Born: 1921; Worcester, Massachusetts
- Died: 1999 (aged 77–78); Annapolis, Maryland
- Spouse: Pamela Kraus

Education
- Education: The New School for Social Research, University of California

Philosophical work
- Era: 20th century Philosophy
- Region: Western philosophy
- School: Continental
- Institutions: Pennsylvania State University
- Main interests: early modern philosophy

Richard H. Kennington (1921 in Worcester, Massachusetts - September 10, 1999 in Annapolis, Maryland) was an American philosopher and professor of philosophy at Pennsylvania State University and the Catholic University of America. He is known for his research on early modern philosophy and his translation of Descartes' Discourse on the Method.

== Books ==
- On Modern Origins: Essays in Early Modern Philosophy (Applications of Political Theory), Pamela Kraus and Frank Hunt (eds), Lexington Books 2004, ISBN 9780739108154
- Discourse on Method (Focus Philosophical Library), Translated by Richard Kennington; Edited, with Introduction and Notes, by Pamela Kraus and Frank Hunt, Focus Publishing 2007, ISBN 9781585102594
