= Kensington Park =

Kensington Park may refer to:

Australia

- Kensington Park, South Australia, a suburb of Adelaide

Canada

- Kensington Park (Burnaby), a park in Burnaby, a suburb of Vancouver, British Columbia

Jamaica

- Kensington Park (Kingston), a cricket ground in Kingston

New Zealand

- Kensington Park, Orewa, a subdivision the northern town of Orewa

United Kingdom

- Kensington Park, Bristol, a district
- Kensington Park, London, a 19th-century designation for a London residential district now known as the Ladbroke Estate in Notting Hill, London
- Kensington Park School, an independent school in London

United States

- Kensington Park, California
- Kensington Park, a park in Chicago, Illinois
- Kensington Park, former name of Kensington, California
- Kensington Park, Florida, a census-designated place
- Kensington Metropark, Michigan

== See also ==
- Kensington
- Kensington Gardens
