= Town of Victoria Park =

Coordinates: 31°58′08″S 115°53′46″E

- Local government area
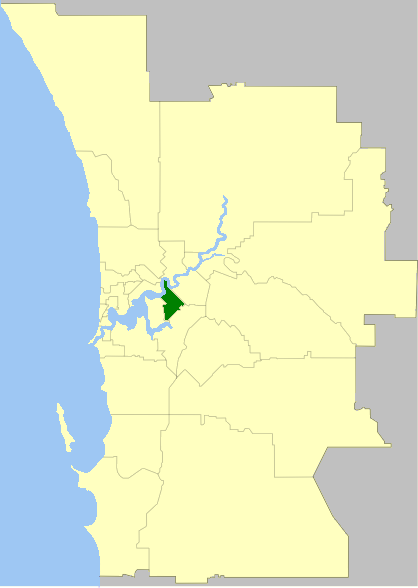
- The Town of Victoria Park within the Perth Metropolitan Area

- Interactive map of Town of Victoria Park
- Country: Australia
- State: Western Australia
- Region: South Metropolitan Perth
- Established: 1994
- Council seat: Victoria Park

Government
  - Mayor: Karen Vernon
  - State electorate: Victoria Park, South Perth
  - Federal division: Swan

Area
  - Total: 17.62 km^{2} (6.80 sq mi)

Population
  - Total: 36,889 (LGA 2021)
- Website: Town of Victoria Park
LGAs around Town of Victoria Park
Perth	Vincent	Belmont
South Perth	Town of Victoria Park	Belmont
South Perth	Canning	Canning

The Town of Victoria Park is a local government area of Western Australia. It covers an area of 17.62 km² in metropolitan Perth, the capital of Western Australia. It had a population of approximately 35,000 as at the 2016 census.

It lies on the southern side of the Swan River, to the south-east of the Perth CBD, and is connected to Fremantle and South Perth via Canning Highway; to the Perth CBD by Graham Farmer Freeway and The Causeway; to Belmont and Perth Airport by Great Eastern Highway and to Cannington by Shepperton Road and Albany Highway. The Perth–Armadale rail line passes through Burswood and forms the eastern boundaries of Lathlain and Carlisle.

The Town of Victoria Park is bounded on the east by the City of Belmont, on the south by the City of Canning on the west by the City of South Perth and on the north by City of Vincent and the City of Perth.

== History ==
Victoria Park first had its own local government between 1894 and 1917. The Victoria Park Road District was established on 17 May 1894. The road district was reconstituted as the Municipality of Victoria Park on 30 April 1897, but was amalgamated into the City of Perth on 1 November 1917.

The modern Town of Victoria Park was established as the Town of Shepperton on 1 July 1994 as a result of the Government of Western Australia having decided to split up part of the City of Perth and create three new municipalities: the Town of Shepperton, Town of Vincent and the Town of Cambridge. The Town of Shepperton was renamed Victoria Park on 2 November 1994.

== Wards ==
The town is divided into two wards along Shepperton Road, each with four councillors:

- Banksia Ward (previously the Carlisle Ward)
- Jarrah Ward (previously the Victoria Park Ward)

== Councillors ==
The councillors for the Banksia Ward are:

- Claire Anderson
- Peter Devereux
- Peter Melrosa
- Lindsay Miles

The councillors for the Jarrah Ward are:

- Jesse Hamer
- Bronwyn Ife (Deputy Mayor)
- Daniel Minson
- Sky Croeser

== Population ==
Historical population
Year	Pop.	±% p.a.
1991	24,313	—
1996	26,096	+1.43%
2001	26,505	+0.31%
2006	27,955	+1.07%
2011	32,433	+3.02%
2016	34,990	+1.53%
2021	36,889	+1.06%

== Suburbs ==
The suburbs of the Town of Victoria Park with population and size figures based on the most recent Australian census:

Suburb	Population	Area	Map
Bentley (Note: Indicates that the suburb is partially shared with the City of Canning.)	9,051 (SAL 2021)	5.4 km^{2} (2.1 sq mi)	
Burswood	2,779 (SAL 2021)	3.4 km^{2} (1.3 sq mi)	
Carlisle	6,733 (SAL 2021)	2.6 km^{2} (1.0 sq mi)	
East Victoria Park	10,569 (SAL 2021)	3.7 km^{2} (1.4 sq mi)	
Kensington (Note: Indicates that the suburb is partially shared with the City of South Perth.)	4,627 (SAL 2021)	2.5 km^{2} (0.97 sq mi)	
Lathlain	3,699 (SAL 2021)	1.6 km^{2} (0.62 sq mi)	
St James	4,894 (SAL 2021)	1.8 km^{2} (0.69 sq mi)	
Victoria Park	9,334 (SAL 2021)	2.6 km^{2} (1.0 sq mi)	
Welshpool	16 (SAL 2021)	8.3 km^{2} (3.2 sq mi)	

== Heritage-listed places ==
As of 2024, 145 places are heritage-listed in the Town of Victoria Park, of which nine are on the State Register of Heritage Places, among them the Burswood canal, Kent Street Senior High School and Victoria Park Post Office.
