= Kensington Gardens (disambiguation) =

Kensington Gardens is a park in London, England.

Kensington Gardens may also refer to:

- Kensington Gardens (play), a 1719 comedy play by the Irish actor John Leigh
- Kensington Gardens, South Australia, a suburb of Adelaide, South Australia
- Kensington Gardens Apartment Complex, an historic apartment complex in Buffalo, New York, United States

== See also ==
- Kensington Garden, a 1722 poem by Thomas Tickell
- Kensington Palace Gardens, a street in Kensington, central London
