= Kensington-on-Sea =

Tourism in Greece

Kensington-on-Sea is a name used by some media and newspapers in the United Kingdom for a part of the Greek island of Corfu, located in the north and northeast of the island.

The area was named after Kensington, a wealthy part of West London, because of the wealthy British tourists who spend their holidays in this area of Corfu.
