= Kensington station =

Kensington station or Kensington railway station may refer to:

== Australia ==
- Kensington railway station, Melbourne
- South Kensington railway station, Melbourne

== Canada ==
- Kensington Railway Station, a National Historic Site of Canada in the town of Kensington, Prince Edward Island

== United Kingdom ==
- Kensington (Olympia) station
- High Street Kensington tube station
- South Kensington tube station
- West Kensington tube station

== United States ==
- Kensington station (MARTA) in Decatur, Georgia
- Kensington station (Maryland) in Kensington, Maryland
- 115th Street/Kensington station, a Metra railroad station in Chicago, Illinois
- Kensington station, a former Chicago & Eastern Illinois/Chicago & Western Indiana railroad station, planned site of Michigan station (CTA) in Chicago, Illinois
