= West Kensington (disambiguation) =

West Kensington is an area of London, England

West Kensington may also refer to:

- West Kensington, Philadelphia, Pennsylvania
- West Kensington tube station
- West Kensington (ward), London
