= South Kensington (disambiguation) =

South Kensington may refer to:

- South Kensington, a district in West London
  - South Kensington tube station
  - South Kensington (film), 2001 British film starring Elle Macpherson and Rupert Everett
- South Kensington, Maryland, a suburb of Washington DC in the United States
- South Kensington railway station, a suburban railway station in Melbourne, Australia
