= Alan Kennington (rugby) =

Rugby union career
- Position: Second row
Provincial / State sides
Years	Team	Apps	(Points)
1969	New South Wales	2	(0)
- Rugby league career

Playing information
- Position: Front row
Club
Years	Team	Pld	T	G	FG	P
1970–72	Cronulla-Sutherland	28	1			3

Alan Kennington is an Australian former rugby union and rugby league player.

Kennington started out as a second rower for rugby union club Manly and was a member of the New South Wales state side in 1969, before getting recruited by Cronulla-Sutherland for the 1970 NSWRFL season.

Injury delayed Kennington's first-grade debut for Cronulla until late in their 1970 campaign, but he became a regular fixture in the Sharks front row the following year, and was a member of the side that won the 1971 Endeavour Cup.
