= Cannington railway station =

Railway station in Perth, Western Australia

Cannington
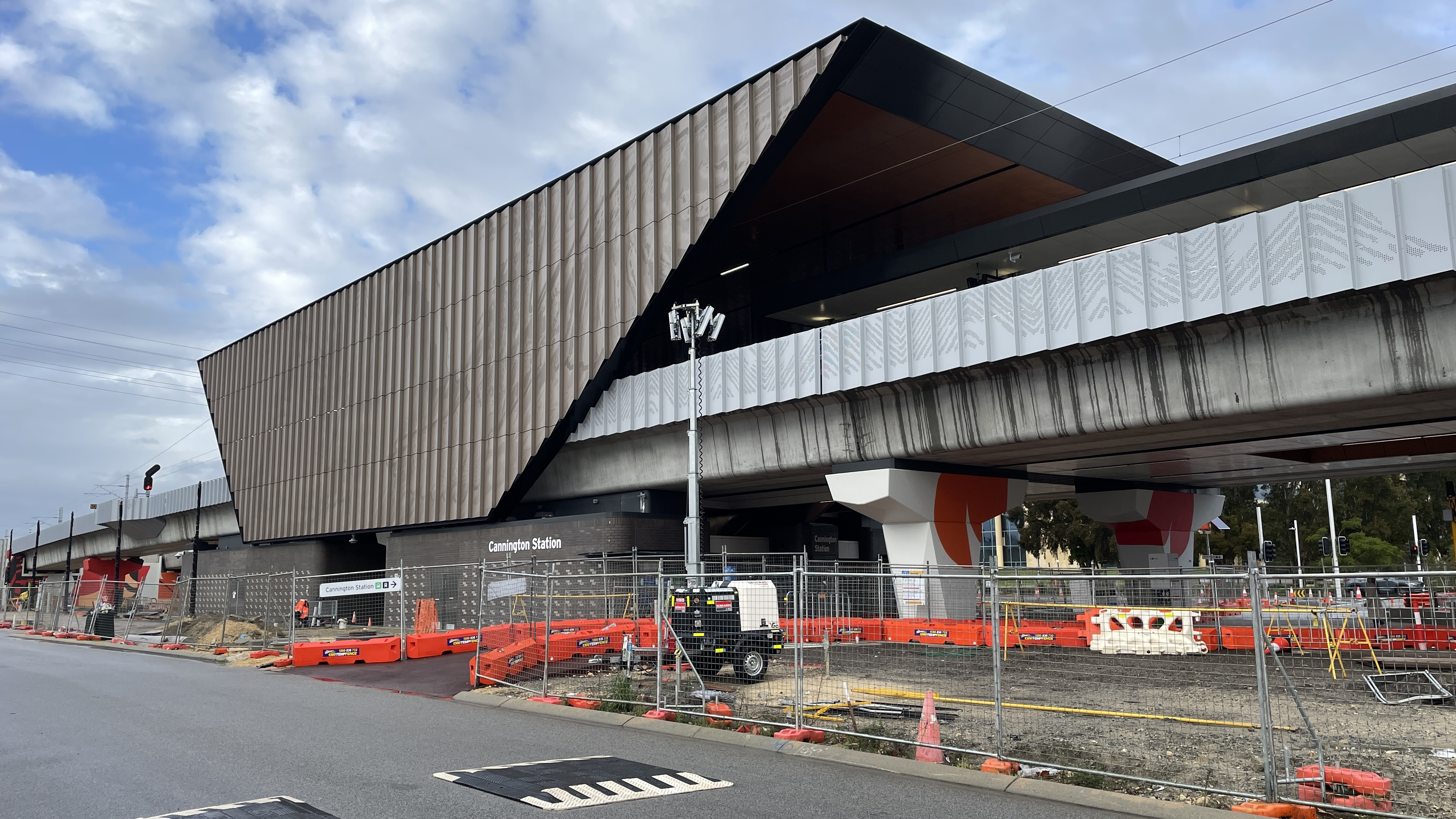
- Station exterior (July 2025)

General information
- Location: Sevenoaks Street, Cannington; Western Australia; Australia
- Coordinates: 32°00′49″S 115°56′43″E
- Owner: Public Transport Authority
- Operator: Transperth Train Operations
- Lines: Armadale line; Thornlie–Cockburn line
- Distance: 12.2 kilometres (7.6 mi) from Perth
- Platforms: 2, 1 island
- Tracks: 2
- Bus routes: 22
- Bus stands: 16

Construction
- Structure type: Elevated
- Accessible: yes

Other information
- Station code: ACN; 99101 (platform 1); 99102 (platform 2)
- Fare zone: 2

History
- Opened: 1897, 08 June 2025
- Closed: 1989, 20 November 2023
- Rebuilt: February 1990, June 2025

Passengers
- 2013-14: 865,018

Services
Preceding station	Transperth	Following station
Queens Park towards Perth	Armadale line	Beckenham towards Byford
Queens Park towards Perth	Thornlie–Cockburn line	Beckenham towards Cockburn Central
Location
- Location of Cannington railway station

Cannington is a suburban railway station on the Armadale and Thornlie–Cockburn lines, serving the suburb of Cannington south of Perth, Western Australia. It is located 12.2 kilometres (7.6 mi) from Perth Station, and is part of the Transperth commuter rail network. It temporarily closed on 20 November 2023 and was rebuilt as part of the Victoria Park-Canning Level Crossing Removal Project; it reopened on 8 June 2025.

== History ==
The original Cannington station was located between Station Street and Crawford Road in East Cannington, and was one of the original stations operational when the Armadale Line opened in 1889. As part of the electrification of the line in the early 1990s, the original Cannington station was replaced by a new station 500 metres (1,600 ft) to the north-west.

== Rebuild ==
As part of a Metronet project for several level crossing removals on the Armadale line, Cannington Station has been rebuilt as a new elevated station with island platforms, and a larger, 16 stand bus interchange underneath the station platforms. The new platforms will be the length of a six car train, as opposed to the previous station's platforms which were the length of a four car train. The new station platforms are accessed by lifts, stairs and escalators. The project also replaced the siding south-east of the station with a central double-ended turnback siding to allow the safe reversal of six-car trains.

To allow for the construction of the new stations and rail line, the Armadale and Thornlie lines closed for 18 months on 20 November 2023. Cannington station was demolished shortly after, with works on the new station and elevated rail beginning in 2024 and finishing on 12 October 2025, although the station without the bike shelter and foreground opened on 8 June 2025. A temporary bus interchange was constructed on Cecil Avenue to assist with the operation of replacement bus services during the shutdown.

== Services ==
Cannington railway station is served by Transperth Armadale and Thornlie–Cockburn line services.

Cannington is one of the busier stations on the Armadale and Thornlie lines, due to its location and it being a key interchange point between Armadale line, Thornlie–Cockburn line and bus services. The station saw 865,018 passengers in the 2013-14 financial year.

== Platforms ==
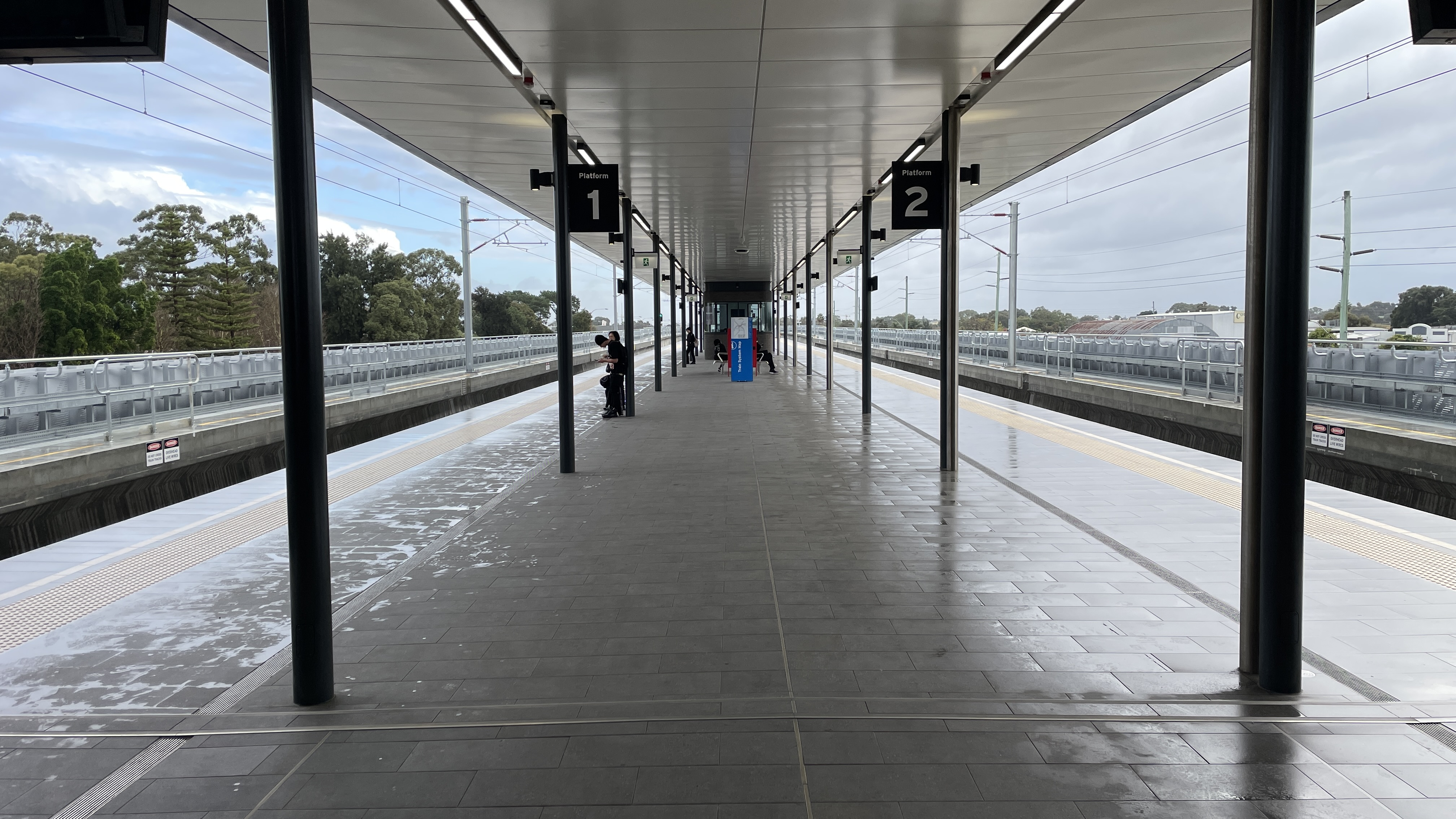
Platforms

Cannington platform arrangement
Stop ID	Platform	Line	Destination	Via	Stopping Pattern	Notes
99101	1	Armadale line	Perth		All stations	
99101	1	Thornlie-Cockburn line	Perth		All stations, TP	
99102	2	Armadale line	Byford		All stations	
99102	2	Thornlie-Cockburn line	Cockburn Central		All stations	

== Bus routes ==
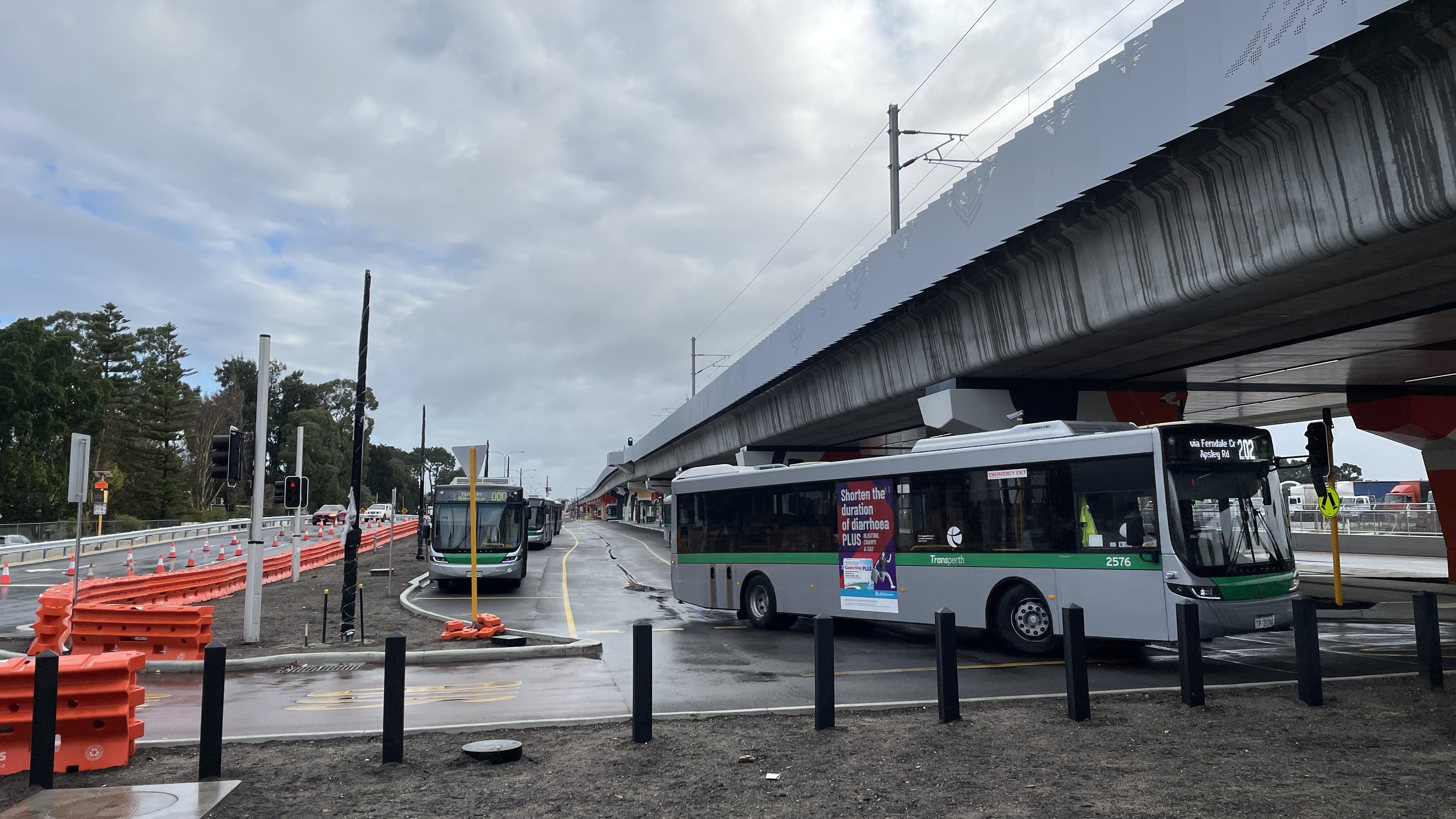
Bus interchange

Stop	Route	Destination / description	Notes
Stand 1	208	to Murdoch University via Ranford Road Station and Thornlie Station	
Stand 1	907	to Byford Station	Rail Replacement, High Frequency
Stand 2	207	to Murdoch University via Nicholson Road Station	
Stand 2	908	to Cockburn Central Station	Rail Replacement, High Frequency
Stand 3	925	to Bull Creek Station via Metcalfe Road	High Frequency
Stand 4	202	to Bull Creek Station via Apsley Road and Riverton Forum Shopping Centre	
Stand 4	203	to Bull Creek Station via Apsley Road and Lynwood Av	
Stand 5	200	to Bull Creek Station via High Road and Fern Road	
Stand 6	72	to Elizabeth Quay Bus Station via Curtin University and Victoria Park	
Stand 7	177	to Elizabeth Quay Bus Station via Chapman Rd and East Victoria Park	
Stand 8	222	to Curtin University Bus Station via Bentley Plaza Shopping Centre	
Stand 8	School Specials		
Stand 9	280	to High Wycombe Station via Hale Road & Berkshire Road	
Stand 9	229	to Maddington Central Shopping Centre via Maddington Stn	
Stand 10	224	Circular to Cannington Carousel, towards East Cannington	
Stand 10	225	Circular to Cannington Carousel, towards East Cannington	
Stand 11	36	to Perth Airport via Kewdale Rd and Airport Dr	
Stand 11	51	to Perth Busport via Orrong Rd and Graham Farmer Fwy	
Stand 12	34	to Perth Busport via Curtin University and South Perth	
Stand 13	920	to Canning Bridge Station via Curtin University	High Frequency
Stand 14	224	to Carousel Shopping Centre	
Stand 14	225	to Carousel Shopping Centre	
Stand 14	229	to Carousel Shopping Centre	
Stand 14	280	to Carousel Shopping Centre	
Stand 14	907	to Perth Station	Rail Replacement, High Frequency
Stand 14	908	to Perth Station	Rail Replacement, High Frequency
Stand 15	Set down only		
Stand 16	Set down only		
