= List of Old Aquinians =

Old Aquinians are former students of Aquinas College (1938–present) and its predecessor Christian Brothers' College (1894–1937), in Perth, Western Australia.

== Government ==
=== Federal ===
Executive

- The Hon. Sir Frederick Charles Chaney KBE AFC (1914–2001) (Class of 1932, CBC Perth) – Minister for the Navy 1964–1966, MHR for Perth 1955–1969
- The Hon. Frederick Michael Chaney AO (Class of 1957) – Minister for Administrative Services 1978, Minister for Aboriginal Affairs 1978–1980, Minister for Social Security 1980–1983, Senator for Western Australia 1974–1990, MHR for Pearce 1990–1993
- The Hon. Peter Durack QC (1926–2008) (Class of 1942) – Minister for Veterans Affairs 1976–1977, Attorney-General 1977–1983, Senator for Western Australia 1971–1993

Legislative

- Chris Back (Class of 1966) – Senator for Western Australia 2009–2017

=== State ===
Executive

- Eric Charlton - Minister for Transport 1993-1998
- Sean L'Estrange (Class of 1985) – Minister for Finance 2016–2017, Minister for Mines & Petroleum 2016–2017, Minister for Small Business 2016–2017, MLA for Churchlands 2013–2021
- Emil Nulsen (1885–1965) (Class of 1903, CBC Perth) – Minister for Justice 1939–1947 and 1952–1959, Minister for Railways 1939–1945, Minister for Health 1945–1947 and 1953–1959, MLA for Kanowna 1932–1950, MLA for Eyre 1950–1962
- John Quigley – Attorney-General 2017–present, MLA for Innaloo 2001–2005, MLA for Mindarie 2005–2013, MLA for Butler 2013–present
- Ben Wyatt (Class of 1991) – Treasurer 2017–2021, Minister for Finance 2017–2021, Minister for Aboriginal Affairs 2017–2021, Minister for Energy 2017–2018, Minister for Lands 2018–2021, MLA for Victoria Park 2006–2021

Legislative

- Ignatius Boyle (1882–1960) (Class of 1897, CBC Perth) – MLA for Avon 1935–1943
- Jonathan Huston (Class of 1979) - MLA for Nedlands 2025–present

=== Local ===
- The Hon. Sir Fred Chaney Sr. KBE AFC (1914–2001) (Class of 1932, CBC Perth) – Lord Mayor of Perth 1978–1982
- Sir Thomas Meagher (1902–1979) (Class of 1919, CBC Perth) – Lord Mayor of Perth 1940–1945

== Judiciary ==
- The Hon. John Chaney (Class of 1970) – Justice of the District Court of Western Australia 2004–2009, President of the State Administrative Tribunal 2009–2014, Justice of the Supreme Court of Western Australia 2009–2018
- The Hon. Edward Arthur Dunphy QC (1907–1989) (Class of 1922, CBC Perth) – Justice of the Supreme Court of the Australian Capital Territory 1958–1993, Justice of the Supreme Court of the Northern Territory 1961–1979
- The Hon. Eric Heenan KC (Class of 1962) – Justice of the Supreme Court of Western Australia 2002–2015
- The Hon. Sir John Lavan (1911–2006) – Justice of the Supreme Court of Western Australia 1969–1981 (CBC Perth)
- The Hon. Rene Le Miere KC (Class of 1962) – Justice of the Supreme Court of Western Australia 2004–2022
- Chris Shanahan SC (Class of 1977) – Chief Justice of the Supreme Court of Tasmania 2025-present

== Public and Community Service ==
- David Fenbury (1916–1976) (Class of 1932, CBC Perth) – senior public servant, delegate to the secretariat of the Trusteeship Council of the United Nations, New York
- The Most Rev. Sir Lancelot Goody KBE (1908–1992) – sixth Archbishop of Perth 1968–1983 and first Bishop of Bunbury 1954–1968 (CBC Perth)
- The Most Rev. Michael Morrissey (Class of 1969) – ninth Bishop of Geraldton 2017–present
- Christopher Shanahan SC – senior counsel barrister, acting commissioner of the Corruption and Crime Commission in Western Australia
- Cedric Wyatt (Class of 1957) – senior public servant and Aboriginal rights activist

== Military ==
- Brigadier Owen Magee (Class of 1942) − military engineer, Director of Fortifications and Works

== Academia and Science ==
=== Rhodes Scholars ===
- 1949: The Hon. Peter Durack QC (1926–2008) (Class of 1942)
- 1958: Maurice Cullity
- 1987: William Jack
- 2009: John McAnearney

=== Chancellor ===
- Michael Chaney AO (Class of 1967) – Chancellor, University of Western Australia see Business
- Nick Klomp – Vice Chancellor & President CQUniversity

=== Others, academia and science ===
- Richard Fox (Class of 1960) – medical physicist
- Alan Lopez AC (Class of 1968) – epidemiologist, academic and professor
- Peter Klinken AC (Class of 1970) – biochemist, medical researcher and academic, Chief Scientist of Western Australia

== Arts, Entertainment and Media ==
- Reg Cribb (Class of 1980) – actor and playwright
- Geoff Gibbs AM (Class of 1957) – actor and principal of Western Australian Academy of Performing Arts
- Peter Kennedy (Class of 1959) – political journalist and author
- Trevor Kennedy AM (1942–2021) (Class of 1959) – editor-in-chief of Consolidated Press Holdings see Business
- Paul Lockyer (1950–2011) (Class of 1967) – news reporter
- Mark Priestley (1976–2008) (Class of 1993) – actor
- Dave Warner (Class of 1970) – author, musician and screenwriter

== Business ==
- Michael Chaney AO (Class of 1967) – chair of National Australia Bank, Woodside Energy; CEO of Wesfarmers
- Herb Elliott AC MBE (Class of 1955) – chair of Fortescue, CEO of Puma North America
- Trevor Flugge AO – chair of Australian Wheat Board
- Trevor Kennedy AM (1942–2021) (Class of 1959) – CEO of AWA, business director business director
- Jack Kilfoyle (1893–1962) (Class of 1914, CBC Perth) – pastoralist, Rosewood station
- Peter Smedley AM (1943–2019) (Class of 1960) – CEO of Colonial Mutual

== Engineering and Construction ==
- Geoff Summerhayes OAM (1928–2010) (Class of 1945) – architect, President of the Royal Australian Institute of Architects (Western Australia)

== Sport ==
=== Athletics ===
- Bill de Gruchy (Class of 1947) – Auckland 1950 gold medal 4 × 110 yd, silver medal 110 yd
- Herb Elliott AC MBE (Class of 1955) – Rome 1960 gold medal 1,500 m, Cardiff 1958 gold medal 880 yd, 1 mile, Sport Australia Hall of Fame 1985

=== Australian rules football ===
- Ben Allan (Class of 1987) – Claremont premiership player 1987 and 1989; Hawthorn premiership player 1991; Fremantle inaugural captain; Simpson Medal 1988, 1989 and 1990; All-Australian 1993 and 1994; WA state representative; Western Australian Football Hall of Fame 2012
- Gerry Bahen (1929–2012) – North Melbourne; South Fremantle premiership player 1952, 1953 and 1954; WA state representative
- Liam Baker (Class of 2015) – Richmond premiership player 2019 and 2020
- Peter Bell (Class of 1992) – South Fremantle; North Melbourne premiership player 1996 and 1999; Fremantle captain; All-Australian 1999 and 2003; Western Australian Football Hall of Fame 2013; Australian Football Hall of Fame 2015
- John Bridgwood (Class of 1968) – Claremont; WA state representative
- Jarrod Cameron (Class of 2017) – West Coast Eagles
- Jason Carter (Class of 2017) – Fremantle
- Brant Colledge (Class of 2011) – West Coast Eagles
- David Crawford – Claremont premiership player 2011 and 2012; WA state representative
- Patrick Cripps (Class of 2012) – Carlton captain, Brownlow Medal 2022 and 2024; All-Australian 2018, 2019 and 2022
- Ross Ditchburn (Class of 1974) – Claremont; Carlton premiership player 1982
- Paul Duffield (Class of 2002) – Fremantle
- Nat Fyfe (Class of 2008) – Claremont; Fremantle captain; Brownlow Medal 2015 and 2019; All-Australian 2014, 2015 and 2019
- David Gault (Class of 1992) – South Fremantle premiership player 1997 and 2005 and captain
- Robbie Haddrill (Class of 1998) – Fremantle
- Alan Johnson (Class of 1974) – Perth premiership player 1976 and 1977; Melbourne; WA state representative; Western Australian Football Hall of Fame 2017
- Percy Johnson (1933–2021) – East Fremantle premiership player 1957, Swan Districts captain coach, and Claremont; WA state representative; Channel 7 football critic; Western Australian Football Hall of Fame 2010
- Daniel Kerr (Class of 2000) – West Coast Eagles premiership player 2006; All-Australian 2007
- Quinten Lynch (Class of 2000) – West Perth premiership player 2003; West Coast Eagles premiership player 2006, Collingwood
- Logan McDonald (Class of 2019) – Sydney Swans
- Simon McPhee (Class of 1986) – Claremont premiership coach 2011
- Jamie Merillo (Class of 1989) – Fremantle
- Terry Moriarty – Perth, Sandover Medal winner 1943; WA state representative; Western Australian Football Hall of Fame 2010 (also attended St Patrick's Boys School)
- Jesse Motlop (Class of 2021) – Carlton
- Stephen O'Reilly (Class of 1989) – Swan Districts; Geelong, Fremantle and Carlton
- Deven Robertson (Class of 2018) – Brisbane Lions
- Trey Ruscoe (Class of 2019) – Collingwood
- Jeremy Sharp (Class of 2019) – Gold Coast Suns, Fremantle
- David Sierakowski (Class of 1992) – St Kilda, West Coast Eagles
- Peter Spencer (Class of 1973) – East Perth; North Melbourne; Subiaco ; Claremont; Sandover Medal winner 1976 and 1984; WA state representative; Western Australian Football Hall of Fame 2007
- Alan Toovey (Class of 2004) – Collingwood premiership player 2010
- Frank Walker – Perth; WA state representative
- Murray Ward (Class of 1954) – Claremont; also coached Aquinas to 7 Alcock Cups
- Chad Warner (Class of 2018) – Sydney Swans
- Corey Warner (Class of 2021) – Sydney Swans
- Taj Woewodin (Class of 2020) – Melbourne
- Elliot Yeo (Class of 2010) – Brisbane Lions, West Coast Eagles premiership player 2018, All-Australian 2017 and 2019

=== Basketball ===
- Tom Garlepp (Class of 2003) – Perth Wildcats, Adelaide 36ers, Gold Coast Blaze, Sydney Kings
- Bradley Ness OAM (Class of 1991) – Australian Rollers, Sydney Paralympics 2000, Athens Paralympics 2004 silver medal, Beijing Paralympics 2008 gold medal and captain, London Paralympics 2012 silver medal
- Corey Shervill (Class of 2015) – Perth Wildcats

=== Cricket ===
- Terry Alderman – 41 Test caps; 65 ODI caps; Sheffield Shield winner 1987–88 Western Australia
- Cameron Bancroft (Class of 2010) – 10 Test caps; 1 T20i cap; Sheffield Shield winner 2021–22, 2022-23, 2023-24 Western Australia
- Mahli Beardman (Class of 2023) – 1 T20i cap
- Ernest Bromley (1912–1967) (Class of 1928, CBC Perth) – first Western Australian Test cricketer, 2 Test caps
- Frank Bryant OAM (1909–1984) (Class of 1927, CBC Perth) – Western Australia
- Nathan Coulter-Nile (Class of 2004) – 32 ODI caps; 28 T20i caps; first-class cricket Western Australia; Perth Scorchers, Mumbai Indians
- Aaron Hardie (Class of 2016) – 15 ODI caps; 18 T20i caps; Sheffield Shield winner 2021–22, 2022-23, 2023-24 Western Australia captain 2026-present; Perth Scorchers; Surrey
- Brad Hogg (Class of 1988) – 7 Test caps; 123 ODI caps.
- Justin Langer AM (Class of 1987) – 105 Test caps; 8 ODI caps; Sheffield Shield winner 1991–92, 1997–98; Western Australia coach 2012–2018, Australian coach 2018–2022, Australian Cricket Hall of Fame 2022
- Tom Outridge, Jr – Western Australia
- Kevin Prindiville – Western Australia
- Terry Prindiville – Western Australia
- Basil Rigg – Western Australia; Sheffield Shield winner 1947–48
- Sean Terry – Hampshire, Northamptonshire
- Darren Wates – Western Australia

=== Cycling ===
- Ben O'Connor (Class of 2013) – 2nd Overall 2024 Vuelta a España, Silver Medal 2024 UCI Road World Championships, 4th Overall 2021 Tour de France and 2024 Giro d'Italia, 4x Grand Tour stage winner

=== Hockey ===
- David Bell OAM (Class of 1972) – Montreal 1976 silver medal, Los Angeles 1984, Hockey Australia Hall of Fame, Sport Australia Hall of Fame 2004
- Don Martin (Class of 1957) – Tokyo 1964 bronze medal, Mexico 1968 silver medal
- Aran Zalewski (Class of 2008) – Tokyo 2020 silver medal

=== Mixed Martial Arts ===
- Jack Della Maddalena (Class of 2013) – UFC Welterweight Champion (2025)

=== Rowing ===
- Ross Brown – World Rowing Championships bronze medal lightweight eight 2004, bronze medal coxless pair 2007, silver medal lightweight eight 2010, gold medal lightweight eight 2011
- Alexander 'Max' Cunningham (Class of 1954) – King's Cup winner 1960; Rome 1960 eight
- Nick Garratt AM (1947–2019) (Class of 1965) – King's Cup rower, national and Olympic rowing coach
- David McGowan (Class of 1998) – King's Cup rower, World Rowing Junior Championships gold medal quad scull 1999, Athens 2004 coxless four
- Stuart Reside (Class of 1995) – King's Cup winner 1999, World Rowing Championships bronze medal quad scull 1999, Sydney 2000 quad scull, Athens 2004 bronze medal eight

=== Rugby Union ===
- Jake Ball (Class of 2009) – Wales (50 caps), Western Force, Scarlets, Green Rockets Tokatsu
- Kyle Godwin (Class of 2009) – Western Force, ACT Brumbies, Connacht
- Zack Holmes (Class of 2007) – ACT Brumbies, Western Force, La Rochelle, Toulouse, Bordeaux Bègles

=== Soccer ===
- Giordano Colli (Class of 2017) – Perth Glory

=== Swimming ===
- Zac Incerti (Class of 2013) – Tokyo 2020 bronze medal 4x100 m freestyle, bronze medal 4x200 m freestyle

=== Volleyball ===
- Luke Smith (Class of 2007) – Competed for Australia in indoor volleyball at the London 2012 Olympics as part of the Volleyroos team.
- Luke Perry (Class of 2012) – Co‑captain of the Australian men’s national indoor volleyball team (Volleyroos), including during their campaign at the 2021 FIVB Nations League.
- Samuel "Sam" Walker (Class of 2012) – Australian national team player who set the FIVB Nations League record with seven aces in a single match (vs Brazil, 2019).

=== Water Polo ===
- Tim Neesham (Class of 1996) – Sydney 2000, Athens 2004 and Beijing 2008
- Tom Hoad AM (Class of 1957) – Rome 1960; Australian captain Tokyo 1964, Mexico 1968 and Munich 1972; Australian coach Montreal 1976, Moscow 1980, Los Angeles 1984 and Seoul 1988, Water Polo Australia Hall of Fame 2009, Sport Australia Hall of Fame 2021
- Joel Swift (Class of 2007) – Rio 2016

== See also ==
- List of schools in Western Australia
- List of boarding schools
- Public Schools Association
