= Marinko =

Marinko (Cyrillic script: Маринко) is a masculine given name and a surname. It may refer to:

- Marinko Čavara (born 1967), politician
- Marinko Galič (born 1970), footballer
- Marinko Jurendic (born 1977), footballer and coach
- Marinko Kekezović (born 1985), handballer
- Marinko Koljanin (born 1957), footballer
- Marinko Mačkić (born 1983), footballer
- Marinko Madžgalj (1978–2016), actor
- Marinko Magda (born 1963), hitman
- Marinko Matosevic (born 1985), tennis player
- Marinko Miletić (born 1980), footballer
- Marinko Petković (born 1976), footballer
- Marinko Rokvić (1954–2021), singer
- Marinko Stevanović (born 1961), writer
- Marinko Šarkezi (born 1972), footballer
- Ray Marinko (1935–2018), Australian rules footballer
- Don Marinko, Jr. (born 1933), Australian rules footballer
- Don Marinko, Sr. (1907–1967), Australian rules footballer
- Tom Marinko (1941-1981), Australian rules footballer

== See also ==
- Marinković
