= Don Marinko =

Don Marinko may refer to:

- Don Marinko, Sr. (1907–1967), an Australian rules footballer
- His son, Don Marinko, Jr. (born 1933), also an Australian rules footballer
