= Manning Road, Perth =

Road in Perth, Western Australia

Manning Road Western Australia

General information
- Type: Road
- Length: 6.60 km (4.1 mi)
- Opened: c. 1948
- Route number(s): State Route 26

Major junctions
- East end: Albany Highway (State Route 30), Cannington
- Leach Highway (State Route 7); Centenary Avenue; Kent Street
- West end: Kwinana Freeway (State Route 2); Canning Highway (State Route 6), Como

Location(s)
- Major suburbs: Bentley, Waterford, Karawara, Manning

Manning Road is a 6.6-kilometre-long (4.1 mi) road in Perth, Western Australia, linking Albany Highway in Cannington to Kwinana Freeway in Como. It forms the entirety of State Route 26.

Manning Road, along with the suburb of Manning, is named after the Manning family, significant landholders in the early years of the Swan River Colony. Henry Lucius Manning purchased land in the vicinity of Mount Henry (near modern-day Salter Point) in 1840, and likely sent his younger brother Charles Alexander Manning to conduct business on behalf of the family, rather than travel to the colony himself. By around 1866, the Manning had a large 1,386-acre (561 ha) estate bounded by the Canning River, Henley Street, and Mount Henry. In 1913, the family divided the estate into 27 lots, three of which, near Canning Bridge, became further subdivided into urban lots. The Mannings retained much of the property until 1948, when the state government resumed the land to create a model suburb originally name Manning Park. Manning Road was the name given to Public Road No 123.

The road's condition was the subject of much public discussion in the 1950s.

A proposal was drawn in the 1980s to construct a southbound on-ramp at the western terminus with the Kwinana Freeway. The land requirements were included on the Perth Metropolitan Region Scheme. The City of South Perth considered the ramp a "major priority" that would increase its road network connectivity, reduce traffic congestion, and improve commuter safety. In 2001, the City estimated the construction cost to be $1.77 million. Construction of the ramp commenced in October 2019 at a cost of $35 million. The ramp opened on the morning of 13 July 2020.

== Major intersections ==
All intersections listed are signalised unless otherwise indicated.

LGA	Location	km	mi	Destinations	Notes
South Perth	Como	0.0	0.0	Kwinana Freeway (State Route 2) – Perth, Fremantle, Rockingham	Western terminus at partial Y interchange: no northbound exit available; northbound entrance ramp connects to the freeway and Canning Highway; access to Canning Bridge railway station. State Route 26 western terminus
South Perth	Como-Manning boundary	0.6	0.37	Ley Street – Salter Point	
South Perth	Manning	1.0	0.62	Welwyn Avenue – Salter Point	
South Perth	Manning-Karawara-Waterford tripoint	1.7	1.1	Elderfield Road	
South Perth-Victoria Park boundary	Karawara-Bentley-Waterford tripoint	2.7	1.7	Kent Street north / Waterford Avenue south – Kensington, Victoria Park, Carlisle	
South Perth-Victoria Park boundary	Bentley-Waterford tripoint	3.2	2.0	Townsing Drive - Curtin University	
South Perth-Canning boundary	Bentley-Wilson-Waterford tripoint	3.9	2.4	Centenary Avenue – Shelley, Fremantle	
Canning	Bentley-Wilson boundary	4.0	2.5	Lawson Street – St James, East Victoria Park, Kensington	Access to Curtin University bus station
Canning	Bentley-Wilson boundary	5.3	3.3	Wyong Road – St James, East Victoria Park	
Canning	Bentley-Wilson boundary	5.8	3.6	Leach Highway (State Route 7) – Fremantle, Welshpool, Kewdale, Perth Airport	
Canning	Cannington	6.3	3.9	Hamilton Street – Queens Park, Kewdale	
Canning	Cannington	6.6	4.1	Albany Highway (State Route 30) – Perth, Armadale, Albany, Bunbury	Eastern terminus at traffic light intersection, continues as Mallard Way eastbound. No access from Mallard Way to Albany Highway or Manning Road nor from Albany Highway south to Manning Road. State Route 26 eastern terminus
1.000 mi = 1.609 km; 1.000 km = 0.621 mi: Incomplete access; Note: Intersections with minor local roads are not shown
