= Prindiville =

Prindiville is a surname. Notable people with the surname include:

- Kevin Prindiville (born 1949), Australian cricketer, brother of Terry
- Steve Prindiville (born 1968), English footballer
- Terry Prindiville (born 1942), Australian cricketer
- Michael Prindiville (born 1940), Salesman, Actor and Gentleman
