= Manning Road =

Manning Road may refer to:

- County Road 19 in Essex County, Ontario, Canada
- Durham Regional Road 58, a numbered road in the Regional Municipality of Durham in Ontario, Canada
- Manning Road, Perth, Western Australia
- Maryland Routes 810H and 810I in the U.S. state of Maryland
