= Christian Brothers' College, Perth =

Independent school in Perth, Western Australia

Coordinates: 31°57′28″S 115°51′53″E

Christian Brothers College
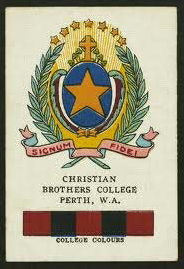

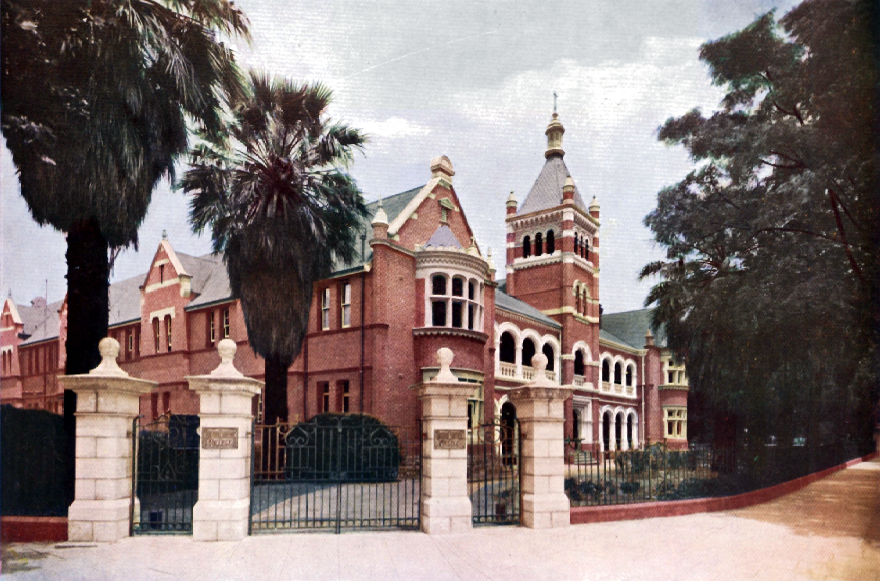
- Perth, Western Australia; Australia

Information
- Type: Independent
- Motto: Latin: Signum Fidei (Sign of Faith) (First college crest 1894–1922)
- Denomination: Catholic
- Established: 1894
- Status: Closed
- Closed: 1962
- Employees: ~50
- Key people: Anthony O’Brien (first headmaster)
- Enrolment: ~700

Christian Brothers College (CBC), informally known as CBC Perth or The Terrace was an Independent school for boys situated on St Georges Terrace in the centre of Perth, Western Australia. The college opened in January 1894, and the college was a founding member of the Public Schools Association in 1905. The college was the second high school (1894) and the second boarding school (1896) in Western Australia. In 1938 boarders and some day students at CBC moved to the new Aquinas College campus at Salter Point. Brother C.P. Foley, who was the headmaster of CBC Perth and who was to become the inaugural headmaster of Aquinas College took with him the Christian Brothers College crest and colours, honour boards, and Public Schools Association membership. Brother Foley insisted the heritage of CBC Perth from 1894–1937 belonged to Aquinas. To further enhance Aquinas as the premier the Christian Brothers College, the main building at Aquinas was designed in the Federation Arts and Crafts architecture of CBC Perth. Meanwhile, although most of the day students remained at CBC Perth, numbers were depleted and the college immediately accepted an overflow of students from St Patrick's Boys School on Wellington Street. CBC Perth continued as a day school from 1938–1961. In 1962, the students and staff of CBC Perth moved to a new site on the East Perth foreshore and the college was renamed Trinity College.

== History ==
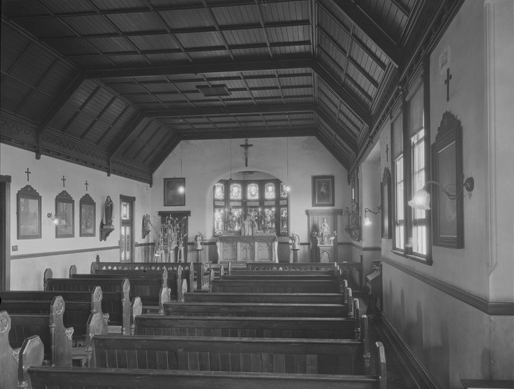
Christian Brothers College, Perth Chapel 1932

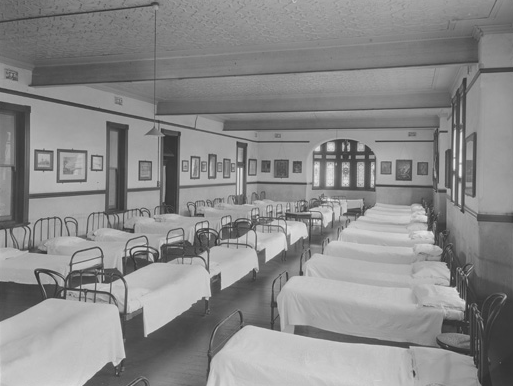
Christian Brothers College, Perth Dormitory 1932

The Christian Brothers opened their first school in Western Australia on 31 January 1894 on the corner of St Georges Terrace and Victoria Avenue in Perth, naming it Christian Brothers College Perth. The Brothers were invited to the colony by Bishop Matthew Gibney who knew of the work of the Brothers in Australia, Ireland and England. The first headmaster of the college, Brother Anthony O’Brien addressed the school upon its opening:

The greatest desire and ambition [of the Brothers] would be to bring up the young entrusted to their charge as good Christians and good citizens, able to fill any position…assigned to then in after life, and to hold their own against all comers in the fairest and in one sense the youngest of the Australian colonies [...].

Initially at CBC Perth only day students were enrolled, but due to population growth in Western Australia during the gold rush period, pressure was put on the school to accept residential boarding students, the first of which were enrolled in June 1896. The site had physical limitations and in 1917, headmaster Paul Nunan saw the necessity to acquire much larger property away from the city centre to accommodate the whole school. The brothers entered into negotiations for the purchase of 8.1 hectares (20 acres) at Point Heathcote on the Swan River, in 1928 they ended up purchasing 95 hectares (234 acres) on the Canning River just east of the Riverton Bridge naming it Clune Park. However, plans to develop this site were shelved due to the Great Depression.

In 1936, at the instigation of Paul Keaney, the superior of nearby Clontarf Orphanage, 62 hectares (154 acres) were purchased from the Manning family at Mount Henry Peninsula at Salter Point on the Canning River at a cost of £A 9,925, equivalent to A$1.1 million in 2022. In 1938 the boarders and some day students moved to the newly built Aquinas College, Salter Point campus, with most day students staying on at CBC Perth. The Aquinas College foundation stone was laid on 11 July 1937, and the new campus opened in February 1938 with 173 boarders and 55-day pupils. C.P. Foley was the first headmaster.

The commencement of the new school year of 1938 marked the beginning of a new era for the College. No longer a member of the PSA and stripped of the schools colours and crest the incoming headmaster Brother Leo Duffy was determined that CBC continue on as day school for boys. In consultation with the senior students a new school crest and colours of light blue, royal blue and green where adopted. The former boarders' dormitories were converted to classrooms and CBC regained its vigour despite the dark clouds of another world war on the horizon.

Plaque commemorating the site of CBC Perth

When Perth was awarded the rights to host the 1962 Empire Games (now known as the Commonwealth Games), the Perth City Council saw the need to construct a large international hotel, they decided to build it next to CBC Perth. Shortly after, the council expressed interest in purchasing the CBC site to allow for the widening of St Georges Terrace and Victoria Avenue. At this time, the college was facing the facts that the site was very small and the buildings were becoming run-down and educationally inadequate.

The Council purchased the site from the College, for £A 267,000, equivalent to A$8.9 million in 2022, and provided the Brothers with a new 5.7-hectare (14-acre) site on the riverbank near the Western Australian Cricket Association grounds (WACA). Here, a brand new school at a cost of £A 270,000 was to be built. Building work at CBC Perth's new site began in November 1960. Trinity College (as CBC Perth was renamed) opened on schedule for the start of the 1962 school year, with the official opening on 25 March 1962. The first headmaster of Trinity College was J A Kelly who had been headmaster of CBC Perth in 1961.

Prior to the demolition of the CBC Building, the Christian Brothers requested permission from Perth City Council to remove artifacts from the buildings. After some reticence the Council referred the Brothers to the demolition contractor who allowed the Brothers to move some relics. The Foundation stone of the 1895 West Wing, the original school bell and eight of the ten chapel windows were taken to Trinity College. Thanks to the efforts of a group of Old Aquinians the pinnacle from the spire of the water tower was taken to Aquinas. The ninth and tenth chapel windows of Saint David and St Thomas Aquinas went to Aquinas. In 1983 the St David window was swapped with the image of the Sacred Heart (that was at Trinity) and was placed in the Trinity Administration Building. Another window, the 1911 "Signum Fidei" was presumed lost. It was tracked down and thirty years later, the window was restored by the Trinity Old Boys association and presented to Trinity at the Colleges Centenary Dinner in May 1994.

== Extra-curricular activities ==
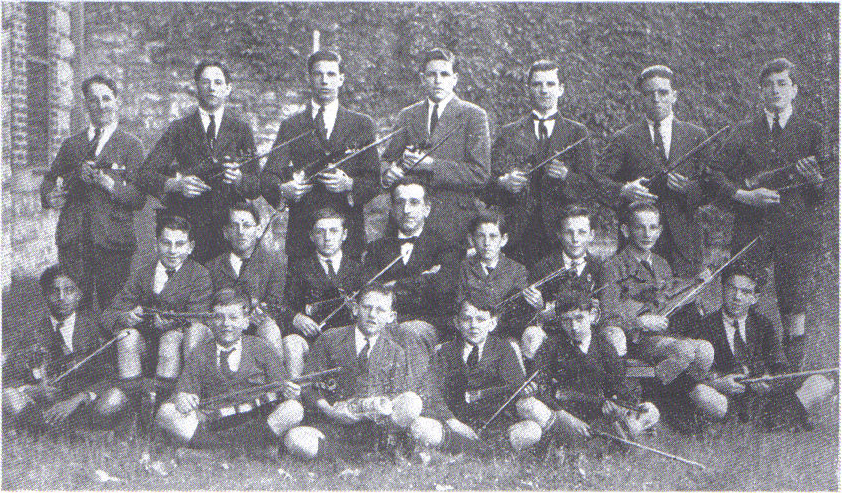
CBC Perth violin club, 1922.

In the early days of CBC Perth music, dancing and elocution were available as extras, over and above the mainstream subjects and sport. These cultural activities, whilst presented in the college prospectus as worthy additional refinements, had a very marginal position in the schools early years. Lessons were taught seldom by brothers, and more commonly by visiting teachers, instead the brothers created highly polished verse-speaking and singing choirs to engage their students in the Arts.

== Notable alumni ==
- Ignatius Boyle – MLA
- Ernest Bromley – Australian cricketer
- Frank Bryant – Western Australian cricketer and cricket administrator
- The Hon. Sir Fred Chaney KBE AFC – MHR, Federal Cabinet Minister, Lord Mayor of Perth
- The Hon. Edward Arthur Dunphy QC – Justice of the Supreme Court of the ACT and Supreme Court of the NT
- David Fenbury – Public servant
- The Most Rev. Sir Lancelot Goody KBE – sixth Archbishop of Perth and first Bishop of Bunbury
- The Hon. Sir John Lavan – Justice of the Supreme Court of WA
- Sir Thomas Meagher – Lord Mayor of Perth
- Thomas Molloy – MLA and Lord Mayor of Perth
- The Hon. Emil Nulsen – MLA and State Cabinet Minister
- Percy Rodriguez – Australian rules footballer, killed in action during the Battle of the Somme

== See also ==
- List of Christian Brothers schools

== Sources ==
- Massam, Katharine (1998). On High Ground: Images of One Hundred Years at Aquinas College, Western Australia University of Western Australia Press ISBN 1-876268-05-0
