= Mount Henry Peninsula =

Peninsula in Western Australia

Coordinates: 32°1′55″S 115°51′40″E

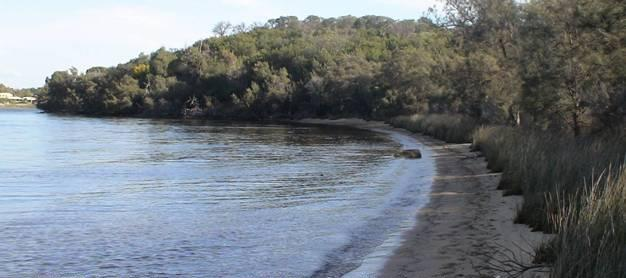
- Mount Henry Shoreline, Aquinas Bay.
Location	Perth, Western Australia
Traditional land owners	Noongar
First title holders	Manning family
Size	11.9 ha (29 acres)
Land title	Privately owned
Current owners	Aquinas College, Perth

Mount Henry Peninsula is a land feature and reserve located 11 kilometres (6.8 mi) south of Perth, Western Australia, on the north bank of the Canning River near the Mount Henry Bridge in Salter Point, Western Australia. It covers 11.9 hectares (29 acres), and includes both Banksia attenuata and Banksia menziesii woodland, and a muddy and desert biome. The peninsula features limestone slopes, shoreline vegetation, wetlands, and contains the most inland vegetated knoll of the Spearwood dunes on the Swan-Canning estuary, as well as a significant variety of natural conditions for birds and other fauna. The Mount Henry Peninisula is a designated Bush Forever site, number 227.

The peninsula is owned by the Congregation of Christian Brothers as part of the Aquinas College property, and is managed as a reserve with the Department of Environment and the City of South Perth for heritage conservation, education and passive recreation values. Senior students at Aquinas College are involved in the Community Service Program, and many choose to participate in Environmental Service.

The "Canning River Wetlands", which takes in Mount Henry Peninsula, is on the Register of the National Estate, (Australia's national inventory of natural and cultural heritage places which are worth keeping for the future). The future preservation of the Mount Henry Peninsula has been guaranteed through the signing of the Bush Forever program by the Christian Brothers as owners of the Aquinas College property.

== History ==
The Noongar people have been acknowledged as the traditional owners of this area. Nyungar people used Mount Henry as a lookout to see where family camps were, from the smoke rising from their campfires. Fish traps were set around the peninsula, food was gathered and game driven onto it using fire-stick farming.

Mount Henry was named after Lieutenant John Henry of HMS Challenger, who led an exploratory party of 25 men from the ship on the first survey into the Canning River and Manning area in June 1829.

In 1936 at the instigation of Paul Keaney, a member of the Christian Brothers, and the superior of Clontarf, that 67 hectares (165 acres) were purchased from the Manning family at Mount Henry on the Canning River. The Christian Brothers established Aquinas College in 1938 and have retained from arrival the Mount Henry Peninsula bushland, following the belief that bushland is the perfect setting for a Christian Boys College: "In the heart of the bush the natural beauty of the surroundings will raise their minds to higher things."

== Geology ==
The Mount Henry Peninsula is a prominent headland with limestone outcrops on the shores of the Canning River, one of few remaining original ecosystems along the river.

Before conservation was a large concern to the college, the slopes were run down and decaying, the sandy soils and limestone slopes were constantly prone to erosion and damage by human interaction. Some had collapsed and were a major occupational hazard. At one point, the peninsula was used as a limestone quarry, the remnants of the quarry are no longer visible from the river or on the designated walking tracks.

In late 1996, the Mount Henry Conservation Group started work on the peninsula. A large proportion of this work was the strengthening and re-enforcing of eroded slopes.

== Flora ==
One of the many banksias on the peninsula

=== Native species ===
Native flora in the Mount Henry Peninsula area are diverse as and change from reeds at the shore to banksia and tuart trees further inland.

The Mount Henry Peninsula is covered by open woodland of tuart (Eucalyptus gomphocephala), merging into low open woodland of marri (Corymbia calophylla), jarrah (Eucalyptus marginata) and the Western Australian Christmas tree (Nuytsia floribunda). The Mount Henry Peninsula is the only remaining bushland on the Swan Coastal Plain which includes plant communities of foreshores, limestone slopes, ridge woodlands and dampland.

At the base of the hill there is a small stand of swamp cypress (Actinostrobus acuminatus). Along the riverbank there is a different range of flora, including Juncus kraussii, Scirpus nododsus and Suaeda australis. The area supports over one hundred native species in all.

==== Banksia ====
Two species of Banksia are found on Mount Henry Peninsula, B. attenuata (candlestick banksia) and B. menziesii (firewood banksia). B. attenuata flowers from spring into summer and the B. menziesii flowering occurs in autumn and winter, the presence of both these species on Mount Henry Peninsula means that at any time during an annual period, at least one of the species of Banksia will be in flower, This is a major factor in the support of Mount Henry Peninsula's bird population.

Due to the sensitivity of both Banksia species to Phytophthora cinnamomi dieback, other less lethal weed killers are used on Mount Henry Peninsula.

=== Introduced species ===
==== Lachenalia reflexa ====
Native to South Africa, the yellow soldier is an introduced weed to the Mount Henry area. The yellow soldier species is so dangerous to natural flora and fauna that it has been placed on the national weed alert program, one of only 28 weeds to be recognised as extremely dangerous at a national level to natural bushland in Australia. Reaching approximately 10 centimetres (3.9 in) when in flower, this plant spreads readily though the distribution of seeds. Yellow soldier plants are also able to regenerate from the bulbs left after fire or incomplete removal of the plant.

The only effective form of removal for the yellow soldier is through spot-spraying of herbicides. The ability to quickly germinate from seed requires multiple courses of spraying to eliminate yellow soldier. The herbicide used has been specially developed by the Department of Agriculture and Food

== Fauna ==
The Mount Henry area of the Canning River is one of several undergoing extensive regeneration. These areas are now sanctuaries for both native flora and fauna, including 37 bird and 11 reptile species. Recorded fauna include:

- Bandicoot
- Legless lizard
- Dugite
- Osprey
- Bobtail lizard
- Raven
- Seagull

=== Reptiles ===
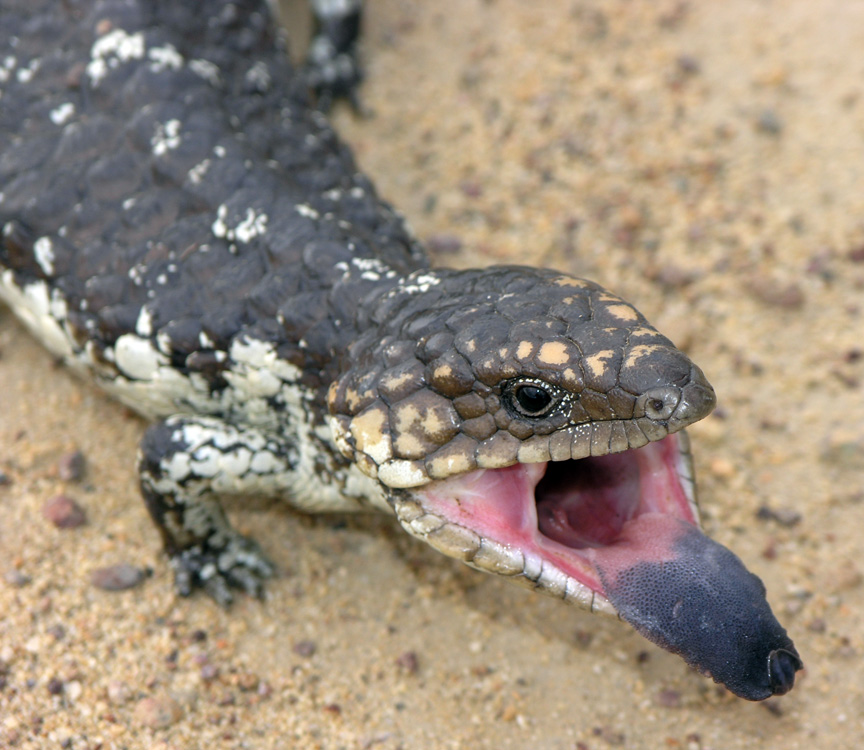
Blue tongued lizard

There are many different species of lizards on the peninsula. Most commonly occurring is the blue tongued lizard however there has also been encounters with armless lizards. There has been little interaction with snakes as they seem to move away from any human movement and interaction within the dense vegetation. There are very few dugites present on the peninsula. The Department of Conservation and Environment, until its dissolution in 2013, surveyed the lizard populations among other things to determine whether they can start a baiting program for introduced species.

=== Birds ===
There are other varieties of birds such as the honeyeater which is sighted throughout the bush on a regular basis, and the crow. seagulls can be found around the school area at times but have not yet inhabited the peninsula itself. The most notable bird life on the Mount Henry Peninsula are the osprey (Pandion haliaetus).

The osprey is the main avian predator of larger fish in the area. Commonly called a fish hawk, the osprey has a long body of around 60 centimetres (24 in) and a wingspan of 135–180 centimetres (53–71 in). They can be found nesting on dead trees, utility poles, pylons and floating buoys. Osprey may only be present for a few weeks of the year but can take up to two fish per hour between 30–60 centimetres (12–24 in) long. Average consumption rate has been estimated at 0.23 kilograms per day (0.0059 lb/ks). The osprey currently nesting on the Mount Henry Peninsula is nearly a permanent resident of the area; it is nested on a platform and post donated by Western Power after a fire swept through the bushland in late 1997.

The osprey is notable as the best example of the predator-prey relationship within the Mount Henry Peninsula region. It is an ecological specialist (it depends on particular types of diet or habitat). The osprey's main diet is fish, and its opposable back claws let it grasp fish as it dives. It is believed to be the only bird in the area to fully submerge itself in a dive. The osprey feeds on nearly any fish which it can digest – fish species identified in the Mount Henry-Canning River area are black bream, Swan River goby and Perth herring.

=== Bandicoots ===
There have been few sightings of the bandicoot – however, on these rare occasions, the species has been narrowed down to the long nosed bandicoot which is found all around Australia.

The bandicoots have been recorded as present on the peninsula since the first Europeans settled in the area, at one point during the history of the peninsula the population of bandicoots dwindled due to the introduction of rabbits to the area. The Mount Henry Conservation Group has eradicated all rabbits from the area and there are records of bandicoots re-inhabiting the peninsula.

== Community Service Program ==
The Community Service Program at Aquinas College presents an opportunity to teach the students some of the aspects of bush regeneration, quite a foreign subject and viewpoint in most cases, and through involvement, enable them to gain some understanding of the value of bushland and how we can assist in its conservation. The group consists of local community members, staff, parents, and students.

=== Peninsula projects ===
Major projects have been achieved since the Conservation Group began, with the assistance of grants and partnerships. Such projects include;

- Preparation of Information Boards for the shoreline and bushland (Funded by the National Estate Grants Programme).
- Areas of the steep limestone slopes which were badly eroded have been retained and re-vegetated.
- Heavy jarrah has been planted and grown for terracing.
- A slope near Mount Henry Bridge was severely eroded by clambering. Tracks were created, junior school children planted trees and fences were mended.
- Following a large bush fire, Western Power, Park Engineers and CALM staff installed an osprey nesting platform to replace the fallen dead Tuart on the slope in which an osprey pair had been nesting.
- Contractors have been employed to spray the burnt area with Fusilade against Veld grass. The spraying program has been supplemented by hand weeding.
- The City of South Perth have placed rabbit bait traps to try to kill off rabbits.
- The MAMSJH Foundation, started in 1990, seeks to rejuvenate plants and oxidise flora on the timeless peninsula. It is most well known for the Bank-sir for Banksia Day on 12 July of each year.

=== Funding ===
The upkeep of the Mount Henry Bushland area is extremely costly, mainly because of its vast size. Funding and grants from charitable organisations, corporations and government are vital to continue the upkeep of this environment. The following companies and organisations have assisted in the funding and upkeep of the area:

- City of South Perth
- Swan River Trust
- Western Power Corporation
- Department of Environment and Conservation
- Alcoa
- Alinta Gas
- Western Australian Government

== See also ==
Mount Henry (Montana)
