= Marinković =

- Pronunciation: [marǐːŋkoʋitɕ]

Origin
- Language: Serbo-Croatian
- Meaning: son of Marinko
- Region of origin: Western Balkans

Other names
- Variant form: see also

Marinković (Serbian Cyrillic: Маринковић) is a Serbo-Croatian surname, a patronymic derived from the given name Marinko. It may refer to:

- Bojana Marinković (born 1996), Serbian tennis player
- Branko Marinkovic, Bolivian politician and businessman born in Santa Cruz, Bolivia
- Dragan Marinković (born 1968), Bosnian actor and TV personality from Sarajevo, Bosnia and Herzegovina
- Dragana Marinković (born 1982), volleyball player who competed for the Croatian and Serbian women's national teams in the 2000s
- Goran Marinković (born 1979), footballer
- Ivan Marinković (born 1993), basketball player
- Josif Marinković (1851–1931), one of the most important Serbian composers of the nineteenth century
- Nebojša Marinković (born 1986), Serbian footballer who currently plays for Maccabi Petah Tikva F.C. in the Israeli Premier League
- Nenad Marinković (born 1988), Serbian footballer
- Ranko Marinković (1913–2001), Croatian author
- Stefan Marinković (born 1994), Swiss footballer
