= Karawara, Western Australia =

Karawara Perth, Western Australia
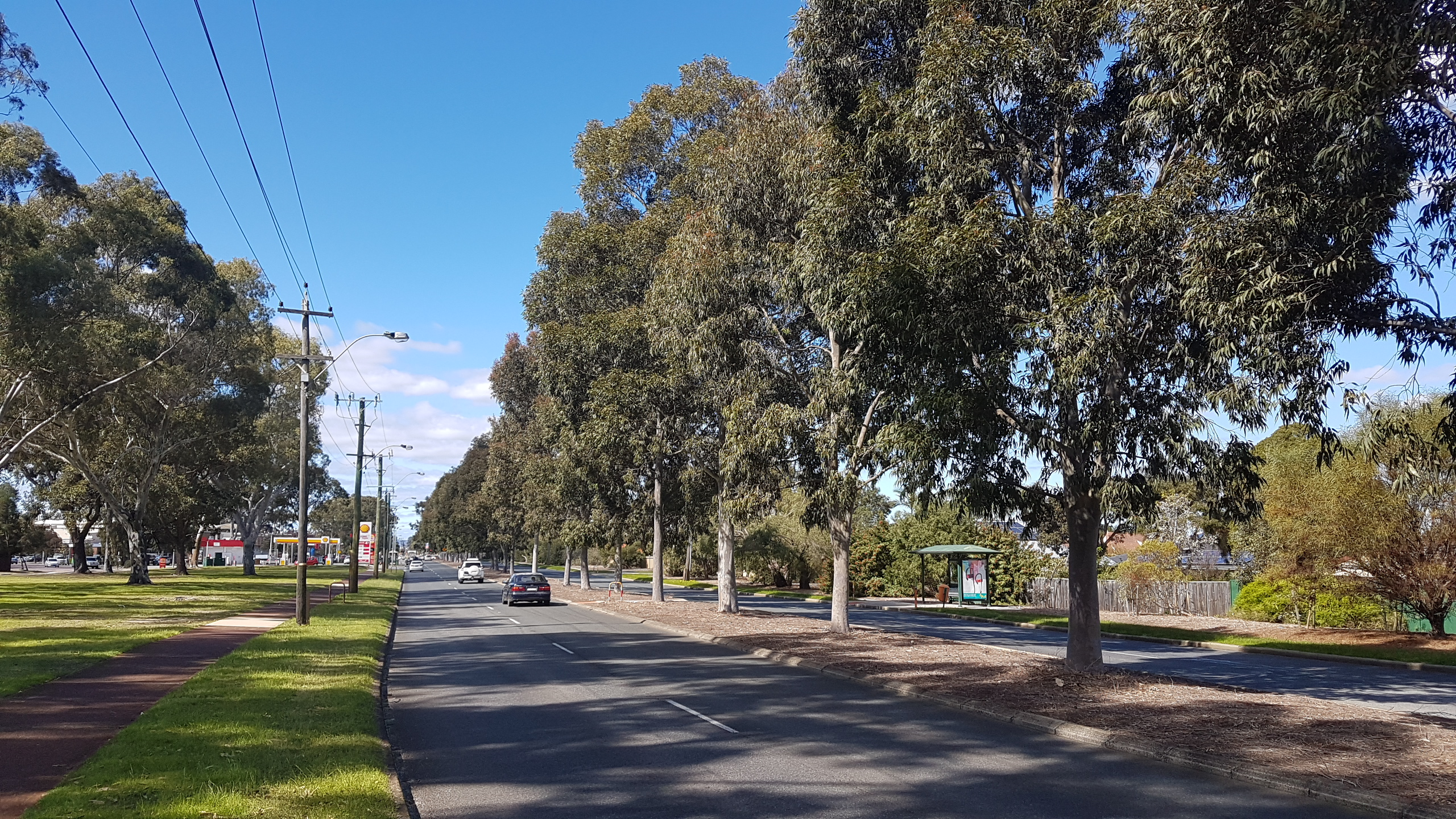
- Manning Road, Karawara
- Coordinates: 32°00′31″S 115°52′53″E
- Population: 1,842 (SAL 2021)
- Established: 1973
- Postcode(s): 6152
- LGA(s): City of South Perth
- State electorate(s): South Perth
- Federal division(s): Swan
Suburbs around Karawara:
Como	Como	Bentley
Manning	Karawara	Bentley
Manning	Waterford	Waterford

Karawara is a suburb of Perth, Western Australia. In 2016 census, the total population was at 2,061.

== History ==
Formerly the southern portion of the Collier Pine Plantation, Karawara is an Aboriginal word meaning green. The suburb name was approved in 1973.

== Geography ==
Karawara is located 7 kilometres (4.3 mi) south of Perth. The suburb is bounded by the Collier Park Golf Course to the north, Kent Street and Curtin University to the east, Manning Road to the south and the Curtin Primary School (formerly known as Koonawarra Primary School) to the west.

== Transport ==
=== Bus ===
- 30 Perth Busport to Curtin University Bus Station – serves Manning Road
- 34 Perth Busport to Cannington Station – serves Gillon Street, Walanna Drive and Jackson Road
- 100 Canning Bridge Station to Cannington Station – serves Manning Road and Kent Street
- 101 Canning Bridge Station to Curtin Central Bus Station – serves Manning Road
