= Paul Keaney =

- Born: October 5, 1888; Kiltyclogher
- Died: February 26, 1954 (aged 65)

Brother Paul Francis Keaney, MBE, ISO (5 October 1888 – 26 February 1954) was an Irish-born Australian Catholic educator. He was accused of abusing the children under his care.

== Biography ==
Keaney was born on 5 October 1888, at Corralskin, Kiltyclogher, County Leitrim, Ireland, son of Terance Keaney, farmer, and his wife Mary, née McGowan. In 1911, he migrated to Australia and in 1916 he became a Christian Brother. In 1924, he became headmaster at Clontarf Orphanage, and he later taught at Christian Brothers College, Perth, and Christian Brothers College, Fremantle. In later life he supervised the building and running of purported child care establishments which were more akin to labour camps and paedophile rings at Tardun and Bindoon, using children forcibly deported from the UK and Malta. He died at Subiaco on 26 February 1954, aged 65. A statue was erected to his memory at Bindoon. In an obituary he was referred to as "The Orphan's Friend" and as having given "a life of devotion to the underprivileged boys..." whereas in reality he had routinely inflicted sadistic attacks and sexual abuse on his wards.

== Abuse of child migrants ==
Keaney imposed forced labour on children under his authority. The boys were made to do the building work in bare feet. They were worked so hard that they developed burns and sores on their feet and hands. Their breakfast invariably contained brick dust. They were made to sleep on urine-soaked mattresses. Furthermore, the boys would be beaten with belts, which had heavy buckles. The beatings would be conducted in front of the other boys. The boys' trousers would be pulled down, in front of the other boys, before they received their beatings.

Keaney also oversaw a culture of abuse in which other brothers and children were encouraged to rape, humiliate and abuse weaker boys. In an effort to raise awareness of the issue, Senator Andrew Murray spoke to a Matter of Public Interest stating "He (Keaney) was a sadist who indulged in criminal assault and who knowingly protected rings of predatory brothers engaged in systemic long-term sexual assault on defenceless children". His record came under unfavourable scrutiny after former students recalled his role as that of a brutal disciplinarian with an ungovernable temper, who neglected their education, exploited their labour and turned a blind eye to sexual misconduct by staff members.

Towards the end of 2016, the Christian Brothers dismantled Keaney's ornate marble grave at Bindoon Agricultural College, and moved his remains to a plot at Karrakatta Cemetery. The new grave is marked by only a simple plaque and makes no mention of his past.

== Honours ==
Keaney was given the honours of MBE and ISO in 1953.

== Sources ==
- Barry M Coldrey, The Scheme: The Christian Brothers and Childcare in Western Australia, Argyle-pacific Publishing, O'Connor, Western Australia, 1993, pp. 462 and 464.
- Western Australia Legislative Assembly, Report of the Select Committee into Child Migrants, Perth, 1996;
- House of Commons, Health Committee, The Welfare of Former British Child Migrants, Third Report, Session 1997–1998, HC 755-I and HC 755-II, Volumes I and II, London, 1997;
- Senate Community Affairs References Committee. "Inquiry into child migration". Parliament of Australia. Archived from the original on 31 May 2009. - Links to report, submissions, public hearing transcripts;
