= Murray Ward =

Australian rules footballer

Murray Ward (4 February 1936 – 20 November 2016) was an Australian rules footballer with the Claremont Football Club during the 1950s and 60's.

Murray broke the Australian Junior hurdles record while he was still attending Aquinas as a school boy. He was part of the Western Australian medley relay team which came second in the Australian Athletics title in 1959.

He was a sprint athletics coach at his former school, Aquinas College in Salter Point. Murray has been the Aquinas sprint athletics coach for 45 years and in this period Aquinas won 27 Inter-school Athletics championships. Murray was also football coach at Aquinas College from 1971 to 1981 and during this time the school won seven Alcock Cups.

Murray was director of football at Claremont Football Club from 1981 to 1983 and in this time Claremont won the premiership in 1981 and was in the grand final in 1982 and 1983. He coached the University Athletics Club between 1980 and 1990 and during this period the athletes Murray coached won 27 Western Australian sprint titles.
