= Wilson, Western Australia =

Wilson Perth, Western Australia
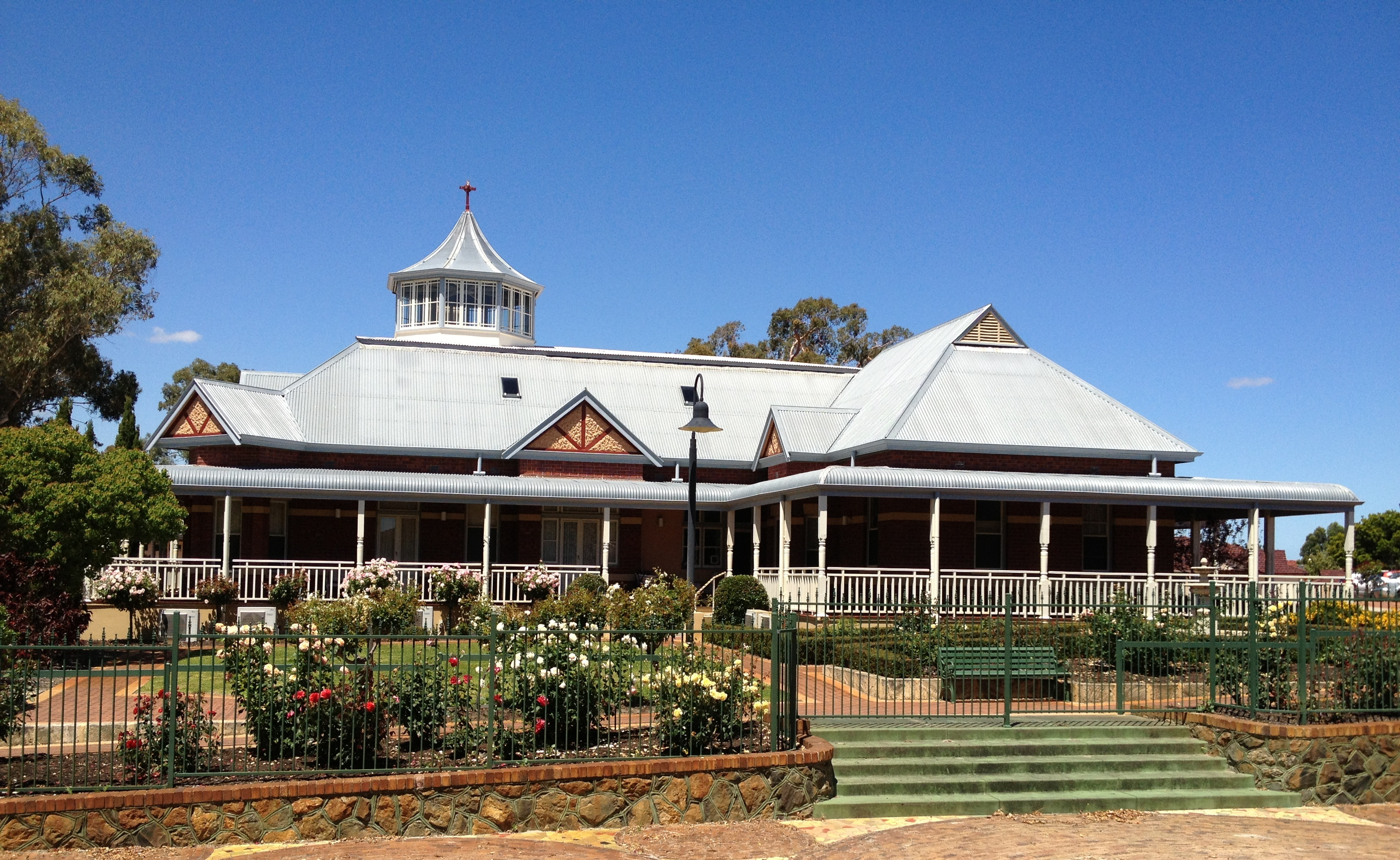
- Castledare Boys' Home, Wilson
- Coordinates: 32°01′13″S 115°54′43″E
- Population: 6,608 (SAL 2021)
- Postcode(s): 6107
- LGA(s): City of Canning
- State electorate(s): Victoria Park, Cannington
- Federal division(s): Tangney
Suburbs around Wilson:
Bentley	Bentley	Cannington
Waterford	Wilson	Cannington
Riverton	Ferndale	Ferndale

Wilson is a suburb of Perth, Western Australia, located within the City of Canning on the north bank of the Canning River. It is a fairly old suburb with parks and close proximity to prominent shopping centres in South Perth. It is favoured by Curtin University students, the reason being its convenient access to the university. Bus routes 72, 73, 100, 177, 178, 179, 200 and the CircleRoute 998/999 travel through this suburb. The suburb contains Castledare, Kent Street Weir, Canning River and Lo Quay River Cafe. Wilson is located quite closely to various parks, some of those being Centenary Park, Sir Thomas Moore Park, Wilson Park at the Kent Street Weir and Alderley Park.

== Transport ==
=== Bus ===
- 72 Cannington Station to Elizabeth Quay Bus Station – serves Manning Road, Leach Highway and Bungaree Road
- 73 Ranford Road Station to Elizabeth Quay Bus Station – serves Fern Road and Bungaree Road
- 100 Cannington Station to Canning Bridge Station – serves Manning Road
- 177 Cannington Station to Elizabeth Quay Bus Station – serves Manning Road
- 178 Bull Creek Station to Elizabeth Quay Bus Station – serves Leach Highway, Braibrise Road, Armstrong Road and Bungaree Road
- 179 Bull Creek Station to Elizabeth Quay Bus Station – serves Fern Road, Bungaree Road, Leach Highway, Braibrise Road and Armstrong Road
- 200 Cannington Station to Bull Creek Station – serves Manning Road, Leach Highway, Bungaree Road and Fern Road
- 998 Fremantle Station to Fremantle Station (limited stops) – CircleRoute clockwise, serves Centenary Avenue
- 999 Fremantle Station to Fremantle Station (limited stops) – CircleRoute anti-clockwise, serves Centenary Avenue
