= Waterford, Western Australia =

Waterford
- Suburb
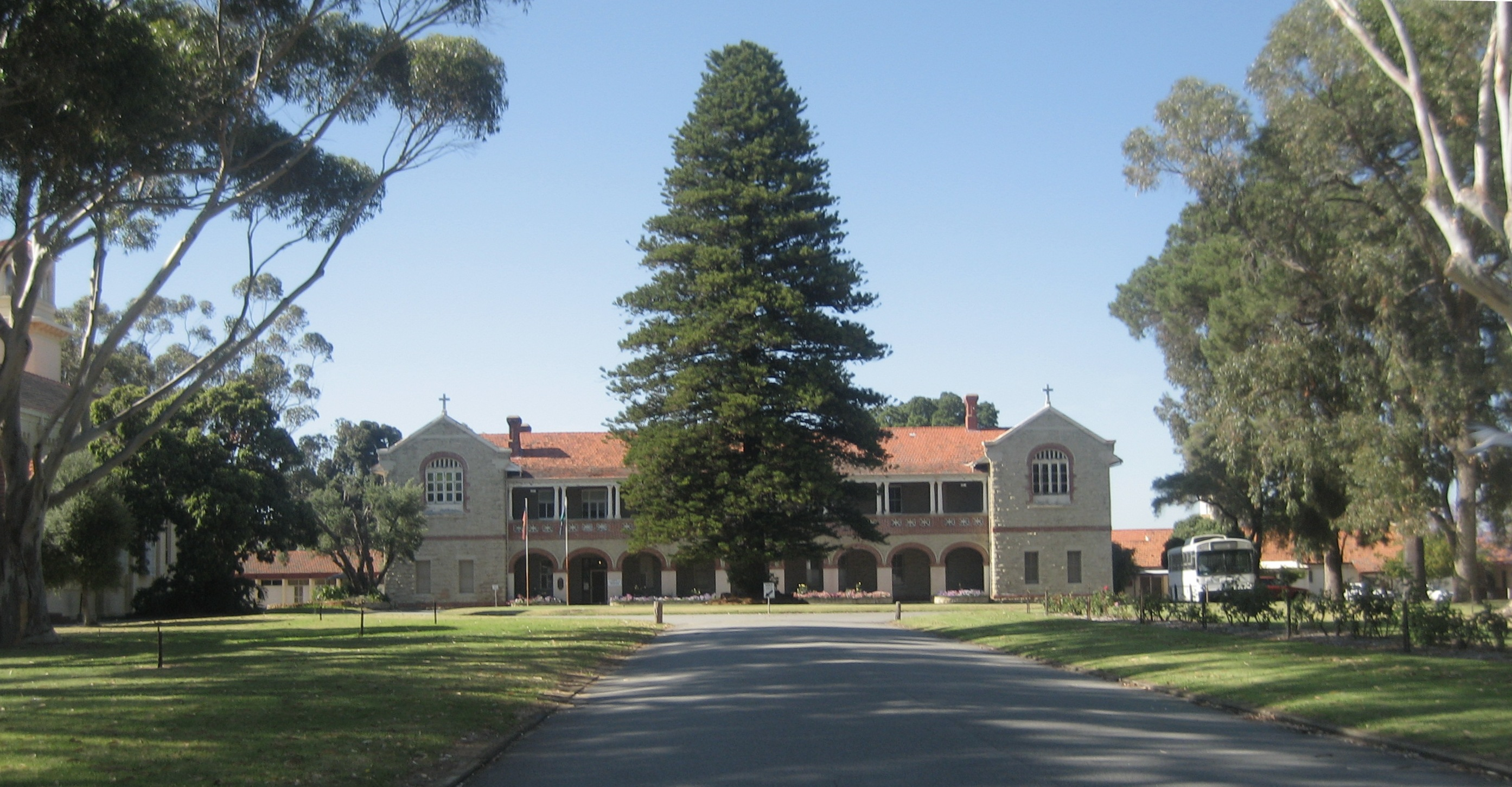
- The Clontarf Aboriginal College in Waterford
- Interactive map of Waterford
- Coordinates: 32°00′57″S 115°53′12″E
- Country: Australia
- State: Western Australia
- City: Perth
- LGA: City of South Perth
- Established: 1980s

Government
  - State electorate: South Perth
  - Federal division: Swan

Population
  - Total: 2,460 (SAL 2021)
- Postcode: 6152
Suburbs around Waterford
Karawara	Karawara	Bentley
Manning	Waterford	Wilson
Salter Point	Canning River	Wilson

Waterford is a small riverside suburb of Perth, the state capital of Western Australia. Its local government area is the City of South Perth.

Waterford is situated on the Canning River.

== History ==
Originally part of the suburb of Karawara, the area south of Manning Road was renamed Waterford in the 1980s.

The area is named after the birthplace in Ireland of Edmund Rice, the founder of the Christian Brothers. From 1901, the Christian Brothers were allocated land for the Clontarf Orphanage, a school and farm for orphaned and disadvantaged boys, situated on 2 square kilometres of land south of Manning Road and along the shores of the Canning River. The college is now known as the Clontarf Aboriginal College and is governed by a representative Board of Management which is responsible to the Catholic Archbishop of Perth through the Director of Catholic Education of Western Australia. The day-to-day running of Clontarf Aboriginal College, including the hiring of all staff and the enrolment of students, is the responsibility of the College Principal.

From 1981, portions of the land were progressively sold by Trinity College, an independent boys school in Perth which owned the land, and subdivided for housing. Streets within Waterford reflect the Irish theme, and are named after places in Ireland. Trinity College holds a remaining portion of the land which has been developed into the school's playing fields for training and PSA sport fixtures.

The 1984 five-bedroom, two-bathroom Perth Telethon Home was built by Statesman Homes in Waterford, on Cashel Way. It was auctioned live on TVW-7 and sold for A$120,000, equivalent to A$416,000 in 2022. This was a new record, as the previous Telethon Home in 1983 sold for A$97,500.

== Education ==
Waterford is near Curtin University on Manning Road. Many foreign students rent or own homes in Waterford because of its vicinity to the university and to the Waterford Plaza Shopping Centre.

== Transport ==
=== Bus ===
- 30 Curtin University Bus Station to Perth Busport – serves Manning Road and Elderfield Road
- 100 Cannington Station to Canning Bridge Station – serves Manning Road
- 101 Curtin Central Bus Station to Canning Bridge Station – serves Manning Road
- 998 Fremantle Station to Fremantle Station (limited stops) – CircleRoute clockwise, serves Centenary Avenue
- 999 Fremantle Station to Fremantle Station (limited stops) – CircleRoute anti-clockwise, serves Centenary Avenue
