= Ray Marinko =

Australian rules footballer (1935–2018)

Personal information
- Full name: Raymond George Marinko
- Born: 29 November 1935; Perth, Western Australia
- Died: 31 March 2018 (aged 82); Doubleview
- Original team: West Perth juniors
- Position: Utility

Playing career^{1}
Years	Club	Games (Goals)
1954–65	West Perth	160 (15)
1957–58	East Perth	24 (?)
- ^{1} Playing statistics correct to the end of 1965.

Career highlights
- West Perth premiership side 1960; Third Sandover Medal 1962

Raymond George "Ray" Marinko (29 November 1935 – 31 March 2018) was an Australian rules footballer who played for the West Perth and East Perth Football Clubs in the Western Australian National Football League (WANFL). The son of former West Perth and Subiaco player Don Marinko, Sr., Marinko excelled at junior football, and began his career at West Perth in 1954, at the age of 18. He transferred to East Perth in 1957, and spent two seasons with the club before transferring back to West Perth, where he remained until his retirement in 1965. Overall, Marinko played 160 senior games for West Perth, including the 1960 premiership, and 24 for East Perth, in a number of different positions.

== Career ==
Marinko was the son of Don Marinko, Sr., who played 194 games with West Perth between 1926 and 1939, and the brother of Don Marinko, Jr., with whom he later played at West Perth. An excellent junior footballer, Marinko played under-18 football for the West Perth Cobbers in the Young Sports Temperance League at the age of 18, and also captained the under-15 side at the same time. In 1953, having begun playing for Mount Hawthorn in the Metropolitan Junior Football Association (MJFA), he was selected in the representative side to tour Victoria. The youngest member of the team, Marinko stayed with former Collingwood player Gordon Coventry while in Melbourne, thus avoiding the troubles of his teammates, who had their clothes stolen whilst staying at a YMCA. Joining his brother in the team, Marinko made his senior debut for West Perth against East Fremantle in round one of the 1954 season, having replaced the injured Brian Falconer. He played a total of 22 games in his first season, alternating between centre and the half-back and half-forward flanks. Marinko was known for his exceptional footpassing, with The West Australian noting that his main attribute was "accurate kicking with either foot". Having established himself as a regular in West Perth's senior side, he was also strong overhead, with a spectacular mark over East Fremantle's Ray French during the 1956 season said to be equal to John Gerovich's famous mark over the same player, although no documentary evidence of the mark has survived.

Perceived unfair treatment from West Perth led Marinko to seek a transfer to East Perth for the 1957 season, which was granted. In particular, Marinko noted an incident where he was demoted to the reserves team after missing a game to attend his best friend's wedding, despite having obtained the permission of coach Frank Sparrow. In two seasons at East Perth, he played 24 games, but was selected in the club's grand final teams in either year. Marinko returned to West Perth in 1959, with his brother just having been appointed to the position of captain-coach. Although Don Marinko was replaced as coach by former Footscray player Arthur Olliver for the 1960 season, both brothers played key parts in West Perth's premiership victory over East Perth, with Ray Marinko considered a leading candidate for the Simpson Medal which was eventually awarded to Brian Foley. Further differences with club administration at the end of the season led the Marinkos to request another transfer to East Perth. Eventually a compromise was reached, with Ray Marinko remaining at West Perth and Don Marinko going to East Perth, where he would win the club's best and fairest award, the F. D. Book Medal, in 1962.

Putting the transfer issues behind him, Marinko was one of the best players in the competition in 1961, finishing third overall in the Sandover Medal, and second in The Daily News' Footballer of the Year competition. Despite his reputation, he never played interstate football, with his non-selection in Western Australia's team at the 1961 Australian National Football Carnival considered surprising. Marinko retired from football at the end of the 1965 season, despite offers from clubs in the Sunday Football League to keep playing. After his retirement, Marinko became involved in the refrigeration business, with his company pioneering a particular method of cold storage for apples.
