= David Fenbury =

Australian public servant

David Maxwell Fenbury
- Born: David Maxwell Fienberg; 24 March 1916; Perth, Western Australia
- Died: 14 May 1976 (aged 60); Leederville, Australia
- Education: Christian Brothers College, Perth; University of Western Australia
- Occupation: Public servant
- Spouses: Joan Marion Brazier; Helen Mary Shiels
- Children: 2

David Maxwell Fenbury (24 March 1916 – 14 May 1976) was an Australian public servant who spent most of his career in the Territory of Papua and New Guinea.

== Early life and education ==
Fenbury was born David Maxwell Fienberg in the Subiaco suburb of Perth in 1916, the third child of railway official David Percival Fienberg and Beatrice Amelia (née Conroy). He attended Christian Brothers' College in Perth and the University of Western Australia, graduating with a degree in Arts in 1937. Whilst at university he edited the university magazine, the Pelican.

== Career ==
In 1937, Fenbury became a cadet patrol officer in the Territory of New Guinea. He joined the Australian Imperial Force in 1941, becoming a lieutenant the following year when he joined the Australian New Guinea Administrative Unit. For the next three years he led guerilla operations against the Japanese invaders, during which time he was promoted to captain, mentioned in dispatches and awarded the Military Cross.

In 1946, Fenbury was seconded to the British Colonial Office to gain knowledge of colonial administration. He was posted to in Tanganyika, where he learned about the village council system.

On 15 May 1948, at St Mark's Anglican Church, East Brighton, Melbourne, Fenbury married Joan Marion Brazier; the couple had two children. He returned to Papua New Guinea the same year and was given responsibility for implementing a new system of local government. In 1954 he moved to Port Moresby and was appointed a District Commissioner in 1955.

In 1956, he was the Australian government's nominee to the secretariat of the Trusteeship Council of the United Nations, a role he held for two years, before returning to Papua and New Guinea to become Secretary to the Department of the Administrator in 1960. In the same year changed his surname from Fienberg to Fenbury by deed poll. After his first wife died in 1964, he married Helen Mary Shiels in a civil ceremony in Port Moresby in May 1966.

In 1969, he was appointed Secretary of the new Department of Social Development and Home Affairs, where he remained until retiring in 1973. The following year he took on a visiting fellowship at the Australian National University. He started writing a book, Practise without policy, completing six chapters before his death. The book was published posthumously in 1978.

== Death ==
Fenbury died on 14 May 1976 from injuries received as a result of being hit by a bus in Leederville, a suburb of Perth. He was survived by his wife, and his two children from his first marriage.
