= Tom Marinko =

Australian rules footballer

Thomas "Tom" Marinko

Personal information
- Full name: Thomas Keith Marinko
- Born: 3 August 1941; Perth, Western Australia
- Died: 12 July 1981 (aged 39); Dingley Village, Victoria
- Original team: West Perth
- Height: 193 cm (6 ft 4 in)
- Weight: 94 kg (207 lb)
- Position: Ruck / defence

Playing career^{1}
Years	Club	Games (Goals)
1960–61	West Perth	18 (2)
1964–65	St Kilda	12 (0)
- ^{1} Playing statistics correct to the end of 1965.

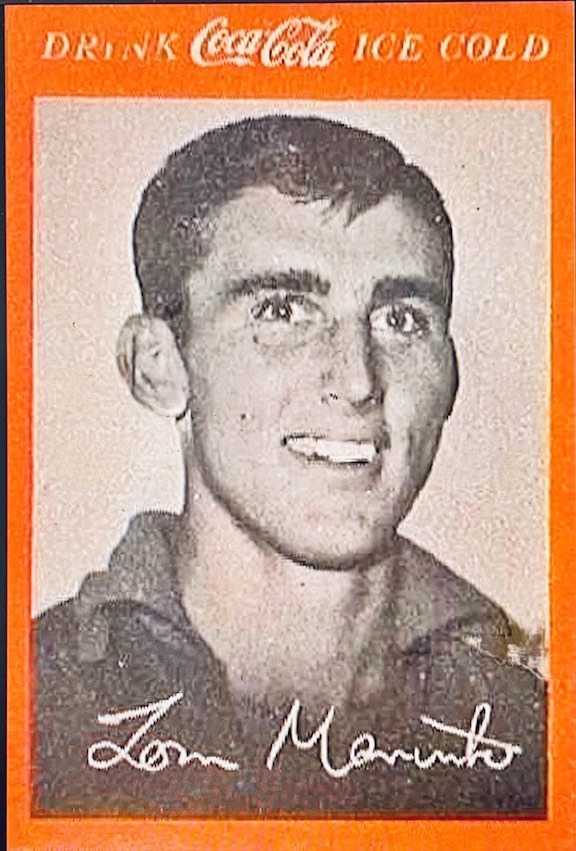
Tom Marinko WAFL football card 1961

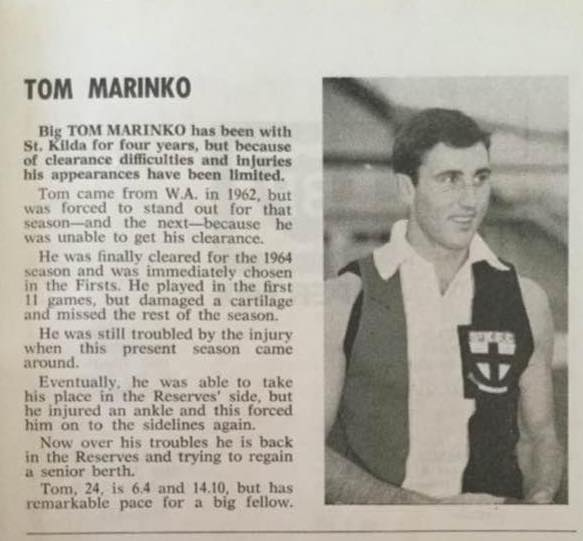
Tom Marinko write-up from St Kilda Football Club publication in 1965

Thomas Keith Marinko (3 August 1941 – 12 July 1981) was an Australian rules footballer who played with West Perth, 1960 – 61 in the West Australian Football League and, after waiting two years to be cleared on transfer, St Kilda, 1964 – 65, in the Victorian Football League.

Played in the Victorian Football Association, with Prahran Football Club 1968 – 72, kicking two goals in the 1970 premiership winning team, also that year received the Allan Marshall Memorial Award for Best Clubman. He played one season for Box Hill in 1976.
