= Ernest Bromley (cricketer) =

Australian cricketer

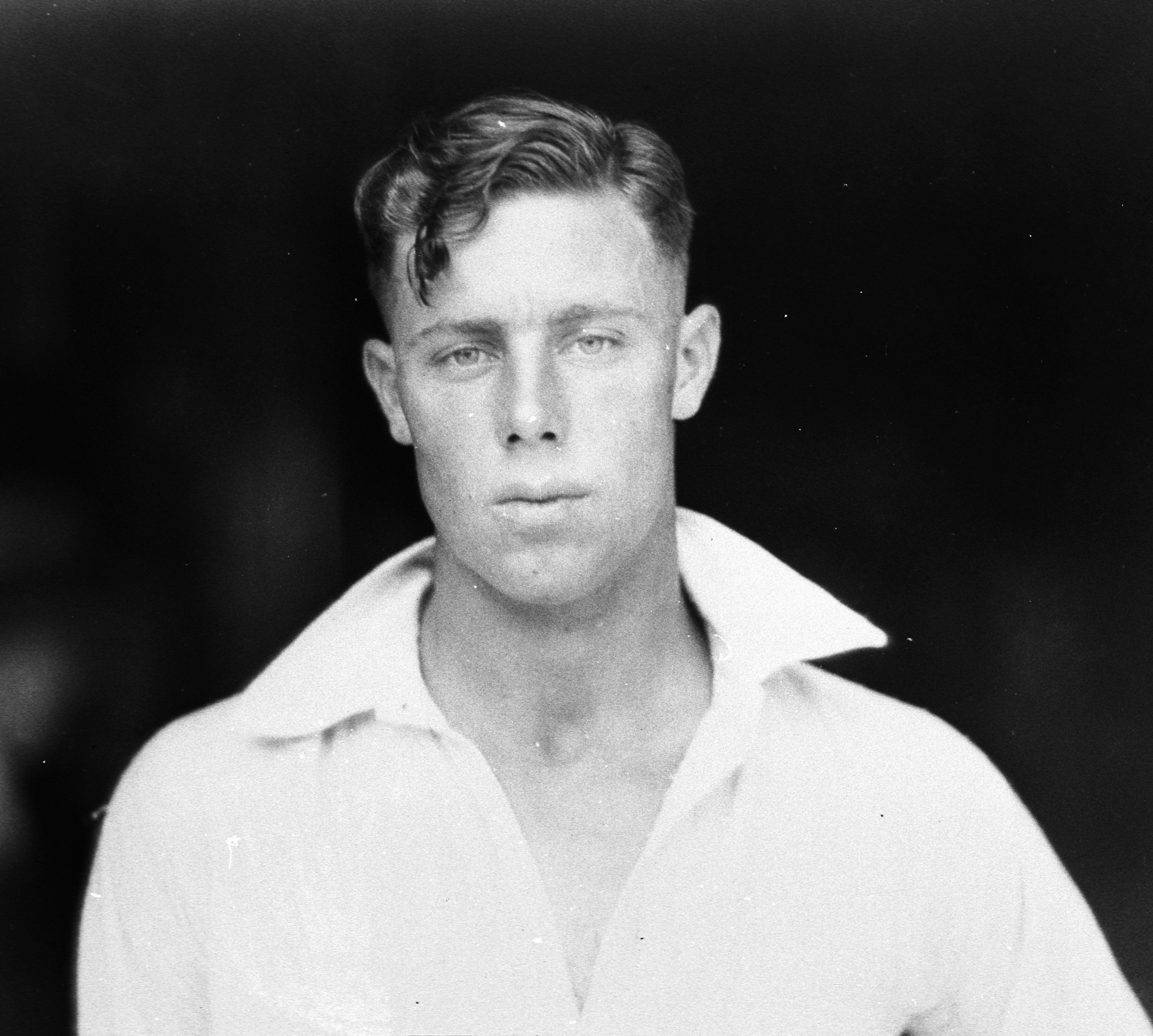
- Photograph of Bromley by Sam Hood

Personal information
- Born: 2 September 1912; Fremantle, Western Australia
- Died: 1 February 1967 (aged 54); Clayton, Victoria, Australia
- Batting: Left-handed
- Bowling: Slow left-arm orthodox

International information
- National side: Australia
- Test debut (cap 146): 10 February 1933 v England
- Last Test: 22 June 1934 v England

Career statistics
Competition	Test	First-class
Matches	2	52
Runs scored	38	2,055
Batting average	9.50	28.54
100s/50s	0/0	3/12
Top score	26	161
Balls bowled	60	3,217
Wickets	0	39
Bowling average	–	42.33
5 wickets in innings	–	0
10 wickets in match	–	0
Best bowling	–	4/50
Catches/stumpings	2/–	43/–
- Source: ESPNcricinfo, 24 May 2020

Ernest Harvey Bromley (2 September 1912 – 1 February 1967) was an Australian cricketer who played in two Test matches, one in 1933 and the other in 1934.

He was educated at Christian Brothers College, Perth (now Aquinas College), where he left in 1928 to play first-class cricket for Western Australia, and in 1933 became the first Western Australian to play cricket for Australia.

Nicknamed Slogger, Bromley was known to have a remarkable throwing arm. In 1933, during a throwing contest at the MCG, his first throw slammed into a barrier erected 130 yards away to protect spectators.

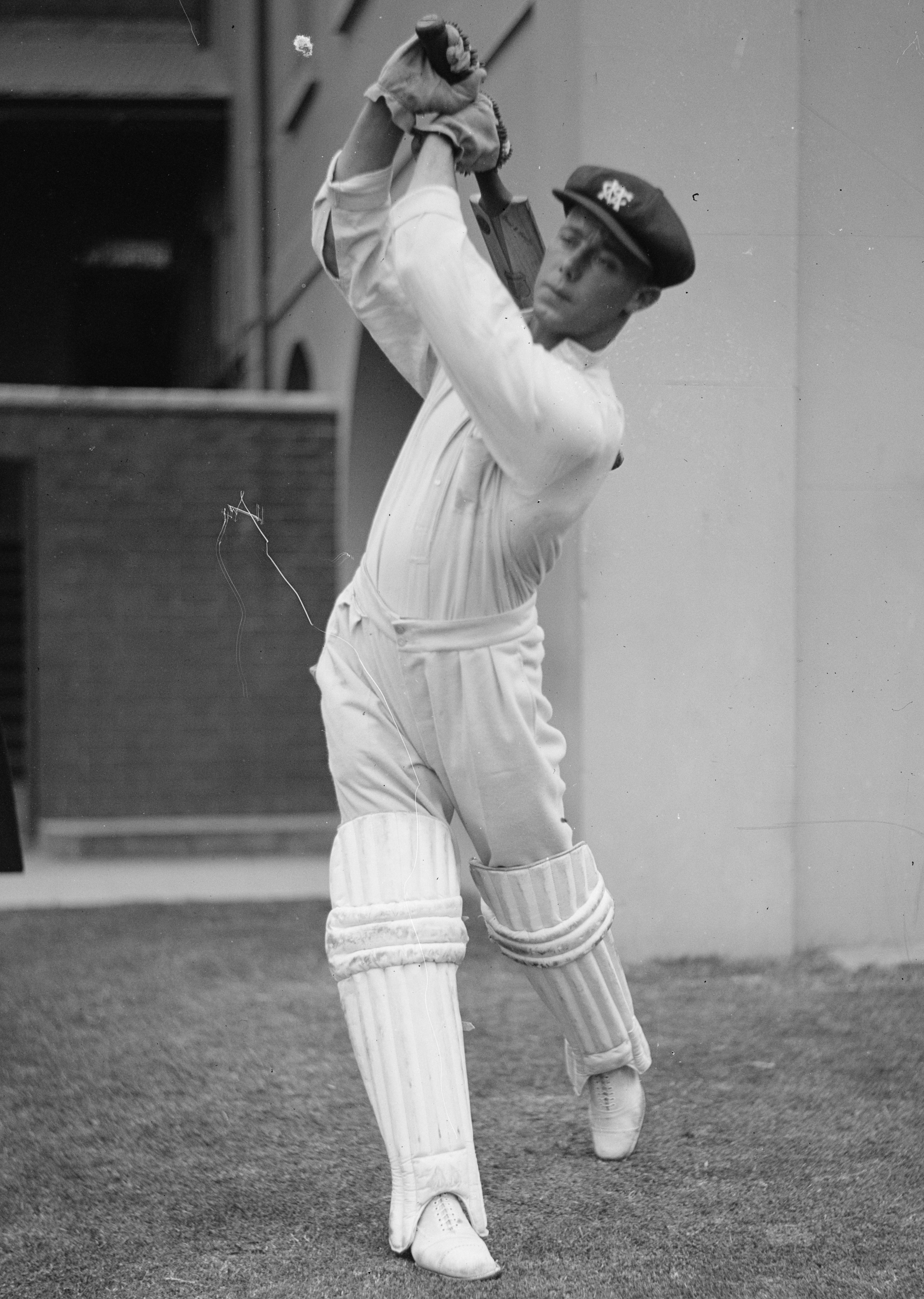
Portrait of Australian cricketer Ern (Ernest) Bromley batting, Sydney, 1933-34
