= John Lavan =

Australian judge (1911–2006)

- Born: September 1911; Perth, Western Australia
- Died: 1 December 2006 (aged 95); Perth, Western Australia
- Education: CBC Perth & Xavier College
- Occupation: Judge
- Parent: Michael Lavan

Sir John Martin Lavan (September 1911 – 1 December 2006) was a judge in the Supreme Court of Western Australia.

Lavan was educated at Christian Brothers, Perth and Xavier College in Melbourne. He joined his father's firm Lavan and Walsh in 1934, where he remained until 1969.

He was appointed to the bench of the Supreme Court of Western Australia in 1969, a position he held until 1981.

He served as president of the law society from 1964 to 1966, and he was also chairman of the Parole Board of WA from 1960 to 1969.
