= Richard Alan Fox =

Australian medical physician

Richard Fox
- Born: July 1943 (age 82); Perth, Western Australia
- Education: Aquinas College, Perth University of Western Australia University of Oxford
- Occupation: Medical Physicist
- Spouse: Sue née Chambers
- Children: 2 children, Alexander (son) and Elizabeth (daughter)
- Parent(s): Alan Fox, Rosalind née Morris

Richard Alan Fox (born July 1943 in Perth, Australia) was an Australian medical physicist. He was the son of Alan Fox, a businessman, and Rosalind née Morris.

== Biography ==
While initially educated at Aquinas College. He was awarded a Commonwealth Scholarship and studied physics at the University of Western Australia. In 1964, he graduated Bachelor of Science with first class honours. In 1966, he went to Oxford University and completed his Doctorate of Philosophy in 1970. During 1970-1974, he was a Research Fellow at the School of Mathematical and Physical Sciences, University of Sussex. The next four years, he worked as a Scientific Assistant at the Institute of Cancer Research, and as a lecturer at the University of London.

Fox returned to Perth in 1978. He worked as Deputy Head of Medical Physics at Royal Perth Hospital. In 1980, he became Head of Department. He was noted for enabling the hospital to operate at the forefront of medical physics. During his career he has produced over 80 scientific papers in peer reviewed journals. The majority covered aspects of nuclear physics, nuclear magnetic resonance, and the use of isotopes in medicine. As well, he was widely noted for minimising the effects of ionizing radiation and ensuring the safe use of electrical devices in hospitals. He retired in 2002 and was appointed Emeritus Consultant Physicist.

Throughout his time at Royal Perth Hospital, Fox worked closely with the Physics Department at the University of Western Australia, where he was appointed associate professor. He gave a lecture course 'Physics in Medicine' to medical students from 1980 until 2012. He was also adjunct professor at Curtin University of Technology. In 2000, he became vice president of the Australasian College of Physical Scientists and Engineers in Medicine. He was President during 2002-2003. He was a member of the Radiological Council of Western Australia from 1985 until 2019, and was chair of the 'Compliance Testing Working Group' from 2002 until 2019. He was an examiner for the Royal Australian and New Zealand College of Radiologists from 2001 until 2020. He is chair of the Cancer Council 'Medical Radiation and Cancer Working Party'. He has been a member since 2004. Presently, he is a visiting professor at Curtin University and a member of a research team investigating the use of x-rays in medicine.

Fox has Fellowships with the Institute of Physics (London), The Australian Institute of Physics, The Institute of Physics and Engineering in Medicine (UK) and the Australasian College of Physical Scientist and Engineers in Medicine.

Fox helped start the Rottnest Voluntary Guides Association in 1986. He is a Life Member and was President, twice. He also volunteers at Scitech. He swims with both Claremont and Mandurah Masters Swimming Clubs possessing a number of State Records.

Fox married Sue née Chambers in 1970 and they had two children, son Alexander and daughter Elizabeth.
