= Don Marinko Sr. =

Australian rules footballer

Don Marinko
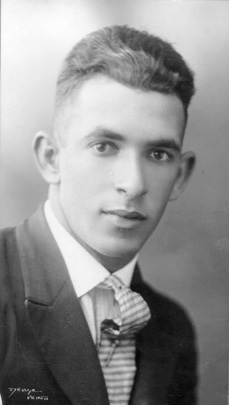

Personal information
- Full name: Domenick Louis Marinko
- Born: 27 August 1907; Kamballie, near Boulder, Western Australia
- Died: 4 May 1967 (aged 59); Fremantle, Western Australia
- Height: 6 ft 0 in (183 cm)
- Weight: 187 lb (85 kg)
- Position: Ruckman

Playing career^{1}
Years	Club	Games (Goals)
1923	Subiaco	3 (1)
1924–31	Boulder City	unknown
1926–39	West Perth	194 (98)

Representative team honours
Years	Team	Games (Goals)
1928–37	Western Australia	13 (2)
- ^{1} Playing statistics correct to the end of 1939.

Career highlights
- Boulder City 1924, 1925; Boulder City captain 1931; West Perth premiership side 1932, 1934, 1935; West Perth best and fairest 1933; West Perth captain 1934–35; West Perth life member (1940); West Perth Team of the Century (2000); West Australian Football Hall of Fame (2011)

Domenick Louis "Don" Marinko (27 August 1907 – 4 May 1967) was an Australian rules footballer who played for the Subiaco and West Perth Football Clubs in the Western Australian National Football League (WANFL) and the Boulder City Football Club in the Goldfields Football League (GFL). Born in the Goldfields region of Western Australia, he was educated at Christian Brothers' College in Perth, and made his senior debut for Subiaco in 1923, at the age of 16. The following season, Marinko returned to the Goldfields in order to find work in the mines, and took up playing for the Boulder City Football Club in the Goldfields Football Association (GFA), playing in premierships in 1924 and 1925. Returning to Perth, he fell into West Perth's zone, and began playing with the club in 1926. Marinko played in premiership sides for West Perth in 1932, 1934, and 1935, and was captain of the club for the latter two seasons. At his retirement in 1939, he had played 194 games for the club, and 197 games total in the WAFL, as well as playing thirteen interstate matches for Western Australia. Having died in 1967 from a sudden heart attack, Marinko was named in West Perth's Team of the Century in 2000, and inducted into the West Australian Football Hall of Fame in 2011.

== Early career ==
Marinko was born to Antony and Mary Marinko on 27 August 1907, at Kamballie, a railway station south of Boulder in the Goldfields region of Western Australia. Educated at the Christian Brothers' College in Perth, Marinko took up playing football for the school's team. He began his senior football career at the age of 16 with Subiaco, debuting during the 1923 season. Playing as a forward, Marinko managed three games, but was criticised for his kicking ability. In a match against South Fremantle, which Subiaco lost by four points, it was reported by The Sunday Times that he had cost his team the match: "...Marinko lost badly and the opportunity thus mulled cost the visitors the match". The following year, Marinko moved to the Goldfields to further his employment opportunities. He began playing with the Boulder City Football Club. In January 1925, Marinko appeared before the Boulder Police Court on two complaints made by a Mr. Ivan Rocci of assault and using abusive language. The charges were dismissed by the resident magistrate, a Mr. J. E. Geary. Midway through the 1925 season, Marinko attempted to transfer to the Mines Rovers Football Club, also based in Boulder. The clearance was refused. On his return to Perth at the end of the 1926 season, Marinko signed with West Perth.

== West Perth career ==
In May 1937, after a match against Claremont, Marinko was suspended for five matches, comprising a two-match suspension for attempting to kick Stan Headon and a three-match suspension for abusive language toward a field umpire. It was noted that "the statement that Marinko had not been reported before during his long football career was taken into consideration" by the tribunal. In April 1934, Marinko was announced as captain of West Perth, a role which he reprised the following season.

== Later life ==
Marinko retired at the end of the 1939 season, in part due to lack of movement caused by a strained back suffered at work, and was elected a life member of West Perth at the club's 1940 annual general meeting. Two of his sons, Donald Anthony and Raymond George Marinko, both played WAFL football for West Perth in the 1950s.

Marinko died in 1967 from a heart attack. He was named in West Perth's Team of the Century in October 2000, and was inducted into the West Australian Football Hall of Fame in March 2011.
