= City of South Perth =

Coordinates: 31°58′55″S 115°51′47″E

- Local government area
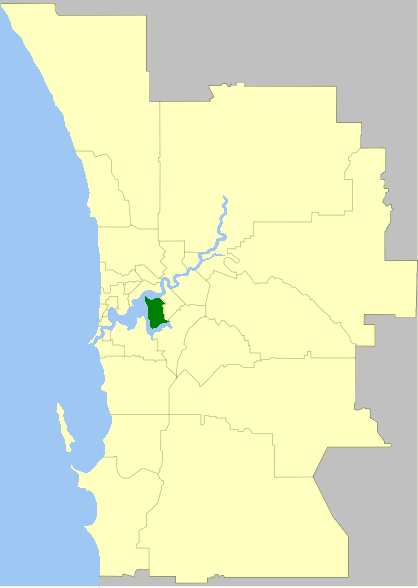
- The City of South Perth within the Perth Metropolitan Area

- Interactive map of City of South Perth
- Country: Australia
- State: Western Australia
- Region: South Metropolitan Perth
- Established: 1892
- Council seat: South Perth

Government
  - Mayor: Greg Milner
  - State electorate: South Perth
  - Federal division: Swan

Area
  - Total: 19.8 km^{2} (7.6 sq mi)

Population
  - Total: 43,405 (LGA 2021)
- Website: City of South Perth
LGAs around City of South Perth
| Perth | Perth | Victoria Park |
| Nedlands | City of South Perth | Canning |
| Melville | Melville | Canning |

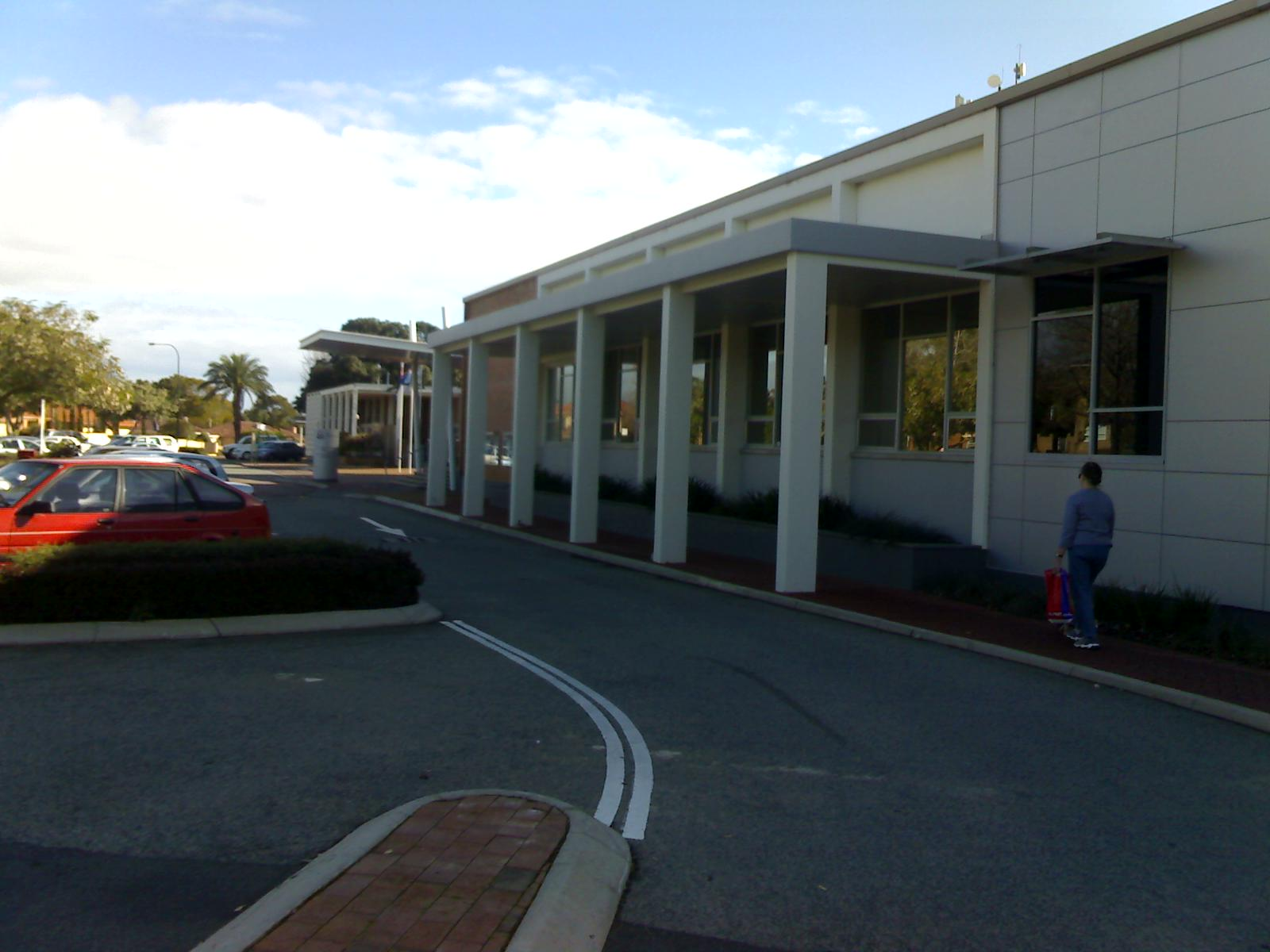
Council chamber buildings

The City of South Perth is a local government area in the inner southern suburbs of the Western Australian capital city of Perth about 4 kilometres (2.5 mi) south of Perth's central business district. The City covers an area of 19.9 square kilometres (7.7 sq mi), maintains 203 kilometres (126 mi) of roads and a little over 4.3 km^{2} of parks and gardens, and had a population of about 42,000 at the 2016 Census. The City is the entirety of the state electoral district of South Perth. An area of Kensington joined into South Perth after the 2013 redistribution, although dwindling population growth in Victoria Park may mean that part of the City will move back.

The area broadly forms a peninsula, being bounded on three sides by the waters of the Swan and Canning rivers.

== History ==
The South Perth Road District was formed on 9 June 1892 and the district became a municipality as the Municipality of South Perth on 21 February 1902. It then reverted to a road district on 1 March 1922, but regained municipality status on 1 March 1956. It was granted city status on 1 July 1959.

In 2014, the WA State Government mounted a proposal for local government reform; the City of South Perth was proposed to be amalgamated with the Town of Victoria Park, together with a sizable portion of the City of Canning. A poll took place during January–February 2015, with the question: "Should the City of South Perth and the Town of Victoria Park be abolished and amalgamated to form a new local government?". The informally (non-binding) suggested name for the new entity was 'City of South Park'.

In order for the poll to prevent the amalgamation from proceeding, at least 50% of electors from either local government were required to vote, and of those, more than half needed to vote against the proposal. At the conclusion of the poll at 6.00pm on 7 February 2015, the outcome was that for South Perth, 50.83% of the City's 26,789 electors voted, with 77.75% voting against the proposal. Although only 38.02% of the Town of Victoria Park's 20,136 electors voted, of those, a clear majority (61.58%) voted against the proposal. However, with more than 50% poll returns, the City of South Perth response was sufficient to cancel the amalgamation of these local governments, and they remained as separate entities.

== Wards ==
The City of South Perth is divided into four wards, each of whom directly elect two councillors.

=== Como ===
2023 Western Australian local elections: Como Ward
| Party | Candidate | Votes | % | ±% |
|---|---|---|---|---|
| Independent Liberal | Bronwyn Waugh (elected) | unopposed | | |
| Registered electors | | 7,436 | | |
| Independent Liberal hold | | Swing | | |

=== Manning ===
2023 Western Australian local elections: Manning Ward
| Party | Candidate | Votes | % | ±% |
|---|---|---|---|---|
| Independent | André Brender-A-Brandis (elected) | 1,415 | 51.59 | |
| Independent | George Watts | 1,127 | 41.09 | |
| Independent | Warren Thorne | 201 | 7.33 | |
| Total formal votes | | 2,743 | 99.17 | |
| Informal votes | | 23 | 0.83 | |
| Turnout | | 2,766 | 35.35 | |
| Independent win | | Swing | | |

=== Mill Point ===
2023 Western Australian local elections: Mill Point Ward
| Party | Candidate | Votes | % | ±% |
|---|---|---|---|---|
| Independent Liberal | Nic Coveney (elected) | 1,820 | 63.70 | |
| No Mandatory Vaccination | Cam Tinley | 1,037 | 36.30 | |
| Total formal votes | | 2,857 | 99.24 | |
| Informal votes | | 22 | 0.76 | |
| Turnout | | 2,879 | 37.18 | |
| Independent Liberal win | | Swing | | |

=== Moresby ===
2023 Western Australian local elections: Moresby Ward
| Party | Candidate | Votes | % | ±% |
|---|---|---|---|---|
| Independent | Hayley Prendiville (elected) | 1,272 | 51.39 | |
| Independent | Stephen Russell | 1,094 | 44.20 | |
| Independent | Krissy McGavin | 109 | 4.40 | |
| Total formal votes | | 2,475 | 99.32 | |
| Informal votes | | 17 | 0.68 | |
| Turnout | | 2,492 | 33.40 | |
| Independent win | | Swing | | |

== Suburbs ==
The suburbs of the City of South Perth with population and size figures based on the most recent Australian census:

| Suburb | Population | Area | Map |
|---|---|---|---|
| Como | 14,786 (SAL 2021) | 6.5 km^{2} (2.5 sq mi) | |
| Karawara | 1,842 (SAL 2021) | 1 km^{2} (0.39 sq mi) | |
| Kensington | 4,627 (SAL 2021) | 2.5 km^{2} (0.97 sq mi) | |
| Manning | 4,219 (SAL 2021) | 1.7 km^{2} (0.66 sq mi) | |
| Salter Point | 2,913 (SAL 2021) | 1.8 km^{2} (0.69 sq mi) | |
| South Perth | 12,596 (SAL 2021) | 5.2 km^{2} (2.0 sq mi) | |
| Waterford | 2,460 (SAL 2021) | 1.5 km^{2} (0.58 sq mi) | |

The suburbs of the City of South Perth are known for being very affluent due to their proximity to the river, private schools and the CBD, all are well above the state's average. The following table contains the suburbs and their median house price, bar Karawara. House prices have dramatically increased in Como and Kensington, while being stagnant in South Perth, Manning and Salter Point, and dramatically falling in Waterford and Karawara.

| Suburb | Median house price |
|---|---|
| Como | $970,000 |
| Karawara | $599,000 |
| Kensington | $965,000 |
| Manning | $825,000 |
| Salter Point | $1,117,500 |
| South Perth | $1,252,000 |
| Waterford | $875,000 |

== Education ==
The City of South Perth is home to numerous primary schools, and five major secondary schools.

=== Secondary ===
- Aquinas College
- Como Secondary College
- Penrhos College
- Wesley College
- Clontarf Aboriginal College

=== Primary ===
- Como Primary School
- Collier Primary School
- Curtin Primary School
- Kensington Primary School
- Manning Primary School
- St Columba's Catholic Primary School South Perth
- Saint Pius X Primary School
- South Perth Primary School

== Library ==
The City of South Perth has two libraries with branches in Manning and South Perth.

The two libraries have in excess of 70,000 items over both locations.

The City of South Perth Local History Collection provides and preserves information about the suburbs of South Perth, Como, Kensington, Manning, Karawara and Salter Point.

Picture South Perth is an online collection of historic images dating back to the 1870s. It contains images from the City of South Perth's Local History Collection which have been scanned and catalogued by library staff.

== Population ==
Historical population

| Year | Pop. | ±% p.a. |
|---|---|---|
| 1903 | 947 | — |
| 1911 | 1,197 | +2.97% |
| 1921 | 2,960 | +9.48% |
| 1933 | 8,731 | +9.43% |
| 1947 | 15,266 | +4.07% |
| 1954 | 21,214 | +4.81% |
| 1961 | 29,941 | +5.05% |
| 1966 | 32,042 | +1.37% |
| 1971 | 31,702 | −0.21% |
| 1976 | 30,388 | −0.84% |

| Year | Pop. | ±% p.a. |
|---|---|---|
| 1981 | 31,524 | +0.74% |
| 1986 | 32,626 | +0.69% |
| 1991 | 34,007 | +0.83% |
| 1996 | 34,819 | +0.47% |
| 2001 | 35,228 | +0.23% |
| 2006 | 38,361 | +1.72% |
| 2011 | 40,739 | +1.21% |
| 2016 | 41,989 | +0.61% |
| 2021 | 43,405 | +0.67% |

== Heritage listed places ==
As of 2024, 189 places are heritage-listed in the City of South Perth, of which 20 are on the State Register of Heritage Places, among them the Old Mill, the Clontarf Aboriginal College and the Como Theatre.
