= Clontarf Aboriginal College =

Private school in Waterford, Western Australia, Australia

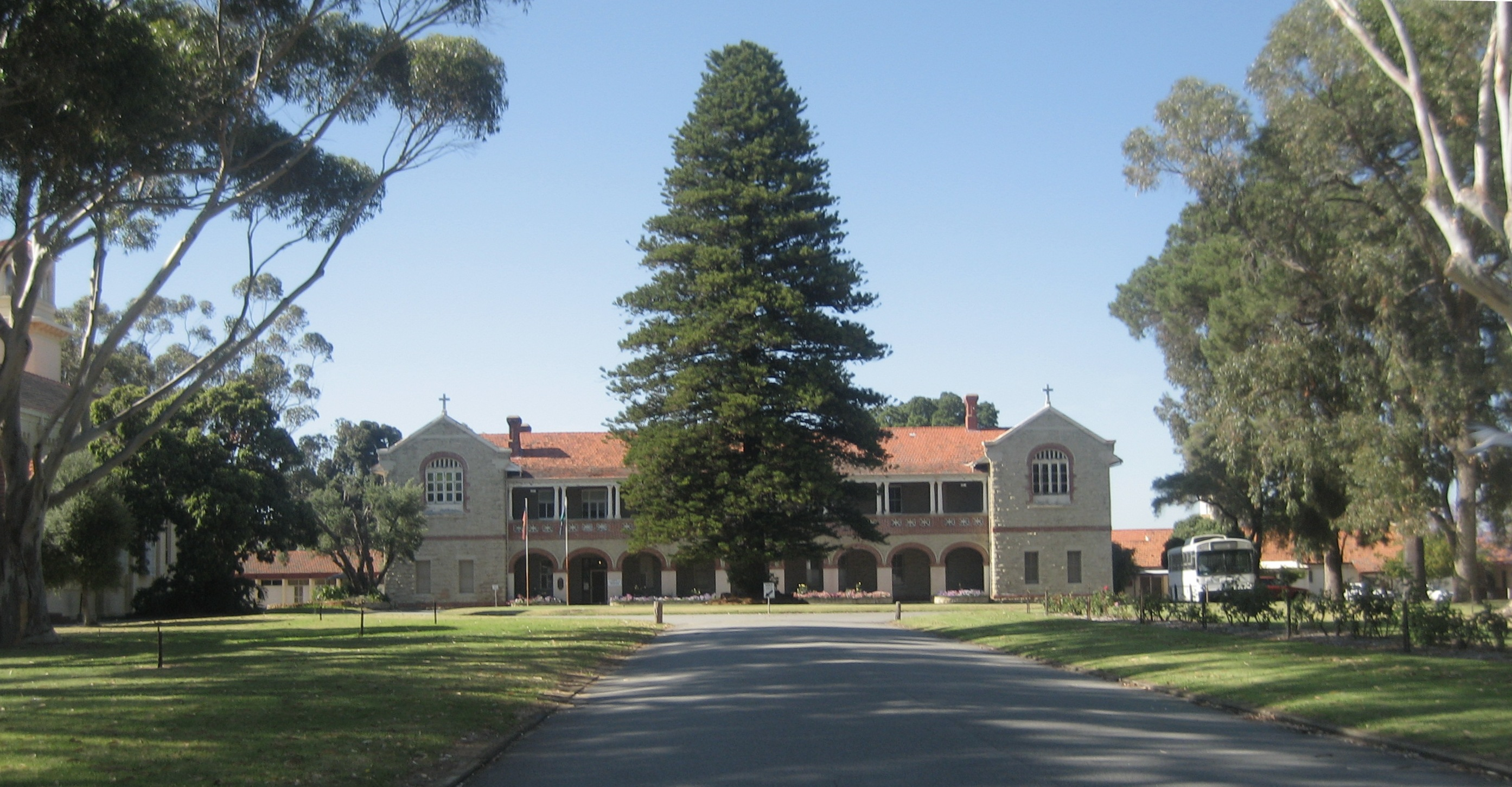

Location
- Waterford, Western Australia; Australia; 32°00′54″S 115°53′38″E

Information
- Type: Private, co-educational
- Denomination: Roman Catholic, Serbian Orthodox
- Established: 1901
- Enrolment: ~300
- Colours: Navy blue, light blue
- Website: www.clontarf.wa.edu.au

Western Australia Heritage Register
- Type: State Registered Place
- Designated: 14 December 2001
- Reference no.: 2401

Clontarf Aboriginal College is a co-educational college for Indigenous Australians youth aged between 15 and 18 years, located in the Perth suburb of Waterford in Western Australia. Since 2000 the college has also been the centre for the Clontarf Football Academy run by the Clontarf Foundation, a program of Australian rules football for Indigenous youth.

Opening in 1901, the facility has been used for a number of purposes since, most notably as an orphanage for boys operated by the Christian Brothers organisation, and also as a convent and as a day and boarding school. During World War II it was used as a training school for the Royal Australian Air Force. Through its history, it has housed and educated day boys and boarders, orphans, vagrants, children from disadvantaged families, child migrants, and Aboriginal children.

In recent years the college chapel has been home to a small Serbian religious community (St Basil of Ostrog) belonging to the Serbian Orthodox Archdiocese of Australia and New Zealand.

== Location ==
The estate is situated on the northern banks of the Canning River between the river and Manning Road, east of Elderfield Road. Curtin University is nearby. It was expanded several times over the years through purchases of adjoining land, and ultimately occupied over 80 hectares (200 acres). From 1981 large portions of the property were subdivided and became the residential suburb of Waterford.

== Etymology ==
The name Clontarf comes from Clontarf (Irish: Cluain Tarbh, meaning 'meadow of the bull'), a wealthy suburb in the north-east of Dublin, Ireland, reflecting the origins of the founder of the Christian Brothers, Edmund Ignatius Rice, as well as many of the early Christian brothers. Clontarf, Ireland, was the site of the Battle of Clontarf in 1014 which saw the defeat of the Vikings by Brian Boru, a High King of Ireland from 1002 to 1014.

== History ==
In 1897, the Christian Brothers assumed control of the Sisters of Mercy orphanage in Subiaco, which housed 81 boys. Shortly after, the Brothers located and acquired land on the banks of the Canning River near present-day Manning. The Bishop of Perth, Matthew Gibney, laid the foundation stone for the new building in 1901.

Originally named St Joseph's Boys' Orphanage, the first building was completed in September 1901 and the first boys were transferred there shortly after. The Superior was Brother Kevin Ryan and other Brothers Bodkin and O'Connor also assisted. Various other buildings including a bakehouse, laundry, store-room and toilets were soon constructed, however most of these early structures have since been demolished. Sometime later it was renamed to St Peter's Intermediate Orphanage.

In 1908 Adolphus Lecaille (a pioneer priest in the Geraldton Diocese) was buried in the grounds on the orphanage. In 1936 his remains were exhumed and reburied in the mortuary chapel of St Francis Xavier Cathedral in Geraldton.

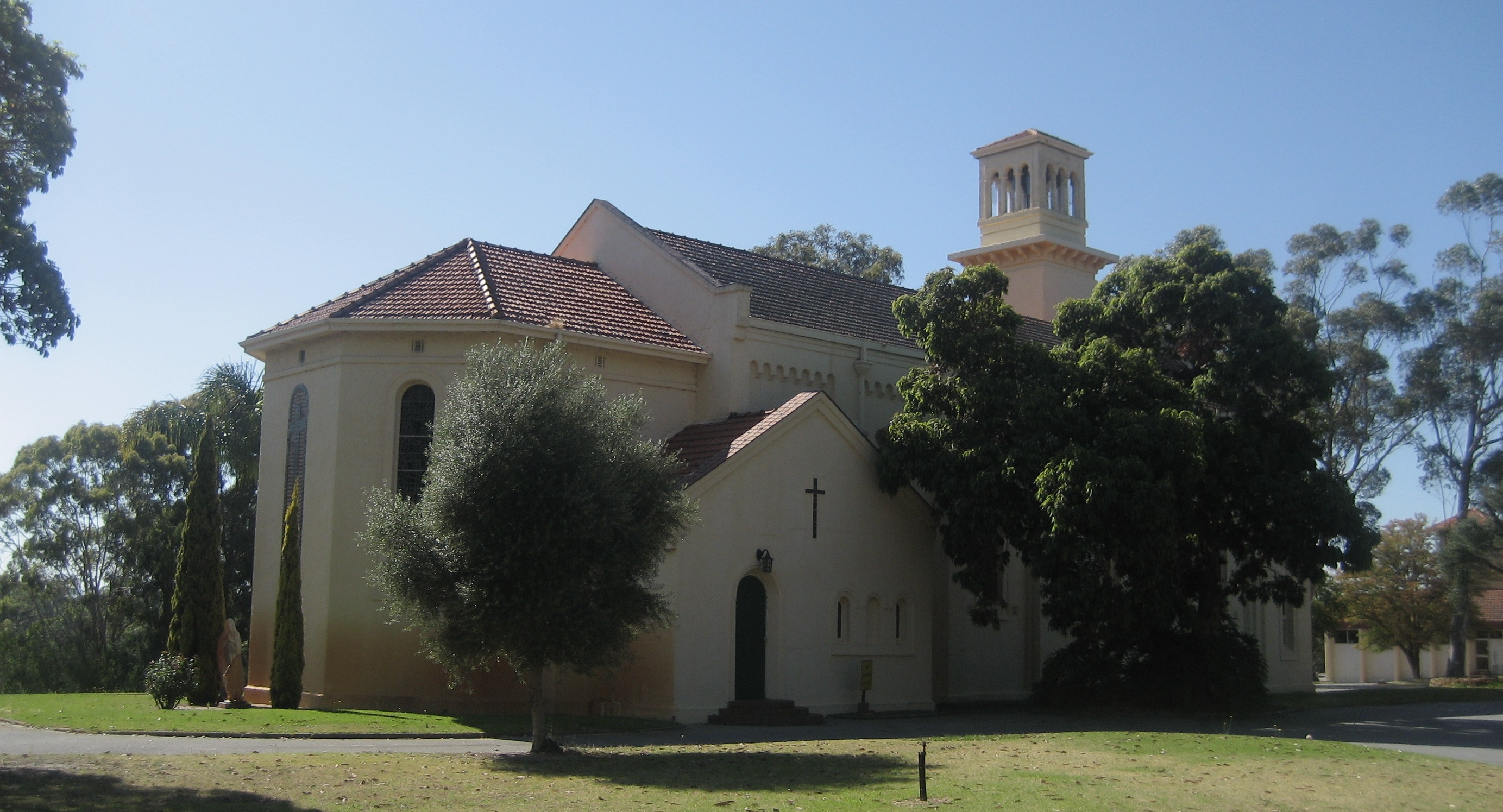
Clontarf chapel

By 1919, Brother Paul Keaney joined the staff and it became known as Clontarf Boys' Orphanage. In 1927, access to the community was improved after a road from Canning Bridge through to Albany Highway was constructed. Originally called Clontarf Road, this is now known as Manning Road. By the 1930s Clontarf was almost self-sufficient with an extensive orchard and vegetable garden as well as a dairy, poultry yard, a piggery and holdings of other livestock. It housed between 100 and 150 boys, usually aged between six and fourteen years. Boys received a primary school education, religious teaching and training in basic manual skills and farm practices. Government funding for the boys was withdrawn at the age of fourteen which was when most boys left.

Between 1936 and 1942, Brother Keaney served a second period as Superior during which he introduced an apprenticeship scheme that provided the boys with trade skills. Many buildings were constructed during the period using the boys as labourers. It is estimated that 300,000 bricks were laid by the boys for a new chapel which was built and consecrated in 1941 by Archbishop Redmond Prendiville. Other tasks done by the boys included roof tiling and carpentry work. In 1941 the orphanage was renamed Clontarf Boys' Town and around that time started taking orphans from Britain.

With the advent of World War II, the Royal Australian Air Force seconded the site as a training school between 1942 and 1945. The Brothers and the boys moved to new farm schools at Bindoon and Tardun.

After the war, the Christian Brothers returned with the Sisters of Mercy also using some of the buildings as a convent through to 1966. A junior secondary school was also introduced with some boys moving to the nearby Aquinas College to complete their schooling. By 1953, the population was 249, and in 1961 it was opened to day pupils and boarders. It was renamed to Clontarf School and in 1964 had a peak enrolment of 303 boys.

From the early 1970s, the Christian Brothers started to use the facilities as a treatment centre for adolescents with behavioural problems and day boys ceased to be enrolled by 1977. Enrolments were reduced to 30 by the early 1980s. It closed in April 1984 but reopened as the Clontarf Aboriginal College on 2 May 1986. Up to 50 Indigenous Australian boys from remote areas of the state board at two hostels run by the college, one at North Beach and the other at North Fremantle. As of 2010, the college is planning to build a boarding facility on site.

== Allegations of abuse ==
In 1920, Christian Brother Frederick Philip Carmody was sentenced to nine years jail for sexual abuse of boys at Clontarf.

In the late 1980s, allegations of abuse and cruelty were made against the Christian Brothers by former students and residents of various institutions run by the order, including Clontarf. An organisation named VOICES (Victims of Institutionalised Cruelty, Exploitation and Supporters) was established to represent and provide counselling for those who had experienced abuse at the Christian Brothers' orphanages.

Keaney in particular was named as an instigator of the cruelty and abuse.

The Christian Brothers accepted that there was strong evidence that many of the allegations were true, and made a public apology. A legal action brought by over 200 former students ran from 1993 in the New South Wales Supreme Court and was finalised in 1996 with an out of court settlement.

== Popular culture ==
In the Australian musical comedy-drama film Bran Nue Dae, Willie (Rocky McKenzie) went to Clontarf, but later ran away and went back to Broome.

== Notable students and attendees ==
- Dominic McCarthy (1892–1975), World War I soldier and Victoria Cross recipient
- Sam Petrevski-Seton (b. 1998), football player
- Cedric Wyatt (1940–2014), public servant

== See also ==
- List of schools in the Perth metropolitan area
- List of boarding schools

== General references ==
- "Municipal Heritage Inventory: Listed Places in Precinct 14 – Waterford" (PDF). City of South Perth. November 2000. Archived from the original (PDF) on 19 August 2006.
- Coldrey, Barry M. (1993). The Scheme: the Christian Brothers and Childcare in Western Australia. O'Connor, Western Australia: Argyle-Pacific Publishing. ISBN 978-1-86307-027-0. OCLC 32830157.
