= Thomas William Meagher =

Australian politician

Thomas Meagher
- Born: 26 March 1902; Menzies, Western Australia
- Died: 27 June 1979 (aged 77); Perth, Western Australia
- Education: Christian Brothers College, Perth and University of Western Australia
- Spouse(s): Marguerite Winifred Hough (first) and Doris Ita Walsh (second)
- Children: Six
- Parent(s): Phillip Meagher & Annie Nee Jennings

Sir Thomas William Meagher (26 March 1902 – 27 June 1979) was a medical practitioner who, starting in 1939, served as Lord Mayor of Perth, Western Australia.

A native of Menzies, Thomas Meagher attended Christian Brothers College, Perth from 1911 to 1919, and completed first-year science at the University of Western Australia in 1920. He subsequently studied medicine at the University of Melbourne, receiving his degree in 1925.

On 8 March 1927 he married Marguerite Winifred Hough (died 1952) at the Chapel of Christian Brothers College, Perth.

He was elected to represent Victoria Park Ward on the Perth City Council in 1937. In 1939, he was appointed Lord Mayor of Perth City Council.

He was President of the Royal Automobile Club of Western Australia from 1945 to 1947; in that role he helped set up RAC Insurance Pty Ltd and the National Safety Council of Western Australia.

He was knighted in 1947 and, on 18 November 1953, married Doris Ita Walsh at CBC Chapel.

He also served as president of the Kings Park Board from 1954 to 1979, chairman of the Trustees of the Western Australian Museum from 1959 to 1973, and president of the Western Australian division of the Australian Olympic Federation from 1947 to 1971.

Thomas Meagher died in Perth, three months past his 77th birthday, and was buried in Karrakatta Cemetery.
