= John Bridgwood =

Australian rules footballer

Personal information
- Full name: John Malcolm Bridgwood
- Born: 18 May 1951 (age 75); Western Australia
- Original team: Aquinas College XVIII

Playing career^{1}
Years	Club	Games (Goals)
1969–1977	Claremont	124
- ^{1} Playing statistics correct to the end of 1977.

John Malcolm Bridgwood is a former Australian rules footballer, who played a state match for Western Australia in 1971, as well as 124 games in the WAFL for the Claremont Football Club.

== Biography ==
The son of former Claremont player Maurie Bridgwood who played 169 games for the club. Bridgwood's main focus as a junior was athletics, where he was a state hurdle champion. In 1968, he won the fairest and best award for the first XVIII at Aquinas College in Western Australia. He made his debut in 1969 for Claremont. Bridgwood became a regular in the league side the following season, and was runner up to Bruce Duperouzel for the Ben Cook medal as Claremont's fairest and best in 1971, as well as gaining State selection. He retired at the end of the 1977 season due to injuries at the age of 26.
