= Don Marinko Jr. =

Australian rules footballer (1933–2024)

Don Marinko

Personal information
- Full name: Donald Anthony Marinko
- Born: 2 January 1933; Perth, Western Australia
- Died: 27 July 2024 (aged 91)
- Original team: Mount Hawthorn
- Position: Centre

Playing career^{1}
Years	Club	Games (Goals)
1952–60	West Perth	164 (42)
1961–62	East Perth	32 (3)
Total		196 (45)

Representative team honours
Years	Team	Games (Goals)
1953–61	Western Australia	12 (1)

Coaching career
Years	Club	Games (W–L–D)
1959	West Perth	21 (10–11–0)
- ^{1} Playing statistics correct to the end of 1939.

Career highlights
- West Perth captain 1959; West Perth premiership side 1960; East Perth best and fairest 1962; East Perth captain 1963 appointed; did not play

Donald Anthony Marinko (2 January 1933 – 27 July 2024) was an Australian rules footballer who played for the West Perth and East Perth Football Clubs in the Western Australian National Football League (WANFL). The son of former West Perth and Subiaco player Don Marinko Sr., Marinko began his career at West Perth in 1952, playing a total of 164 games for the club mainly as a centreman, including as captain-coach of the side in 1959. He transferred to East Perth for the 1961 season, but his career was ended by a knee injury prior to the start of the 1963 season. Marinko also played 13 interstate matches for Western Australia, including the 1953 Australian National Football Carnival.

== Career ==
The son of Don Marinko Sr., who had played 194 games with West Perth between 1926 and 1939, and the brother of Ray Marinko, with whom he later played with at West Perth, Marinko excelled at junior football, winning trophies playing for the West Perth juniors in the Young Sports Temperance League, and also playing with Mount Hawthorn in the Metropolitan Junior Football Association (MJFA). He originally tried out with the South Fremantle Football Club in the WANFL, but was advised by the coach of South Fremantle, Clive Lewington, to return to West Perth, the club whose recruitment zone he resided in, to avoid the need for a clearance. Marinko debuted for West Perth in 1952, and after a season playing as a half-forward flanker and winger, he was selected to represent Western Australia at the 1953 National Carnival in Adelaide, where he was the youngest player in the team. He was made captain-coach of the club for the 1959 season, with the club winning 10 out of 21 games, but was replaced by Arthur Olliver the following season, under whom the club won the 1960 premiership. A dispute with the club led Marinko to transfer to East Perth for the 1961 season. He played in the club's grand final loss to Swan Districts in 1961, and the following season won the F. D. Book Medal as the club's fairest and best player. In 1963, Marinko was appointed captain of East Perth, but was unable to take up the role after breaking his knee in a pre-season practice match against Perth, which caused his retirement from football. After the conclusion of his playing career, Marinko continued as the club as an assistant to coach Kevin Murray, and served time on the selection committee.
