= Terry Prindiville =

Australian cricketer (born 1942)

Personal information
- Full name: Terence John Prindiville
- Born: 20 November 1942 (age 83); Subiaco, Western Australia
- Batting: Right-handed
- Bowling: Slow left-arm orthodox
- Role: Opening batsman

Domestic team information
- Years: Team
- 1969/70–1971/72: Western Australia
- FC debut: 31 October 1969 Western Australia v Queensland
- Last FC: 31 December 1971 Western Australia v South Australia
- LA debut: 30 November 1969 Western Australia v South Australia
- Last LA: 4 November 1970 Western Australia v Tasmania

Career statistics
Competition	First-class	List A
Matches	12	3
Runs scored	610	27
Batting average	30.50	9.00
100s/50s	1/1	0/0
Top score	107	21
Balls bowled	184	56
Wickets	3	1
Bowling average	22.66	46.00
5 wickets in innings	0	0
10 wickets in match	0	0
Best bowling	3/26	1/46
Catches/stumpings	15/–	0/–
- Source: CricketArchive, 7 October 2011

Terence John "Terry" Prindiville (born 20 November 1942) is an Australian former cricketer who played for the Western Australia cricket team from 1969 to 1972. The older brother of Kevin Prindiville, who also played cricket for Western Australia from 1978 to 1979, Terry played mainly as an opening batsman, appearing in twelve first-class matches and three List A matches. He made one century, a score of 107, and also took three wickets with his slow left-arm orthodox spin.
