= Kevin Prindiville =

Australian cricketer (born 1949)

Personal information
- Full name: Kevin Joseph Prindiville
- Born: 18 September 1949 (age 77); Subiaco, Western Australia
- Batting: Right-handed
- Bowling: Leg-break
- Role: Middle-order batsman

Domestic team information
- Years: Team
- 1978/79: Western Australia
- FC debut: 2 December 1978 Western Australia v New South Wales
- Last FC: 27 January 1979 Western Australia v Tasmania

Career statistics
Competition	First-class
Matches	3
Runs scored	108
Batting average	21.60
100s/50s	0/1
Top score	78
Balls bowled	160
Wickets	0
Bowling average	–
5 wickets in innings	–
10 wickets in match	–
Best bowling	–
Catches/stumpings	6/–
- Source: CricketArchive, 2 January 2012

Kevin Joseph Prindiville (born 18 September 1949) is an Australian former cricketer who played for the Western Australia cricket team from 1978 to 1979. The older brother of Terry Prindiville, who also played cricket for Western Australia, he played mainly as a middle-order batsman, appearing in three first-class matches.

He was educated at Aquinas College in Perth.
