= Manning, Western Australia =

Manning
- Suburb
- Interactive map of Manning
- Coordinates: 32°00′48″S 115°52′12″E
- Country: Australia
- State: Western Australia
- City: Perth
- LGA: City of South Perth
- Established: 1940s

Government
  - State electorate: South Perth
  - Federal division: Swan

Population
  - Total: 4,219 (SAL 2021)
- Postcode: 6152
Suburbs around Manning
Como	Como	Karawara
Como	Manning	Waterford
Salter Point	Salter Point	Waterford

Manning is a suburb of Perth, Western Australia.

== History ==
The land was originally purchased by Henry Manning in 1856. He was a bachelor and his land in Perth was administered by his brother Charles Alexander Manning, who arrived in the colony in 1854 and subsequently became mayor of Fremantle. The land was left to his brother's descendants. In 1936/37, 68 hectares (167 acres) was sold by the family to the Christian Brothers for the construction of Aquinas College. The suburb was subdivided in 1948, initially being named the Manning Estate. Eventually Manning became the official name of the area.

Manning is 7 kilometres (4.3 mi) south of the Perth central business district and is within close proximity of Curtin University. The area has abundant green open spaces and is close to the Canning River foreshore.

Schools in Manning are Manning Primary School on Ley Street, St Pius X Catholic Primary School on the corner of Ley Street and Cloister Avenue, and Curtin Primary School (formerly Koonawarra Primary School) on Goss Avenue.
