= Salter Point, Western Australia =

Salter Point
- Suburb
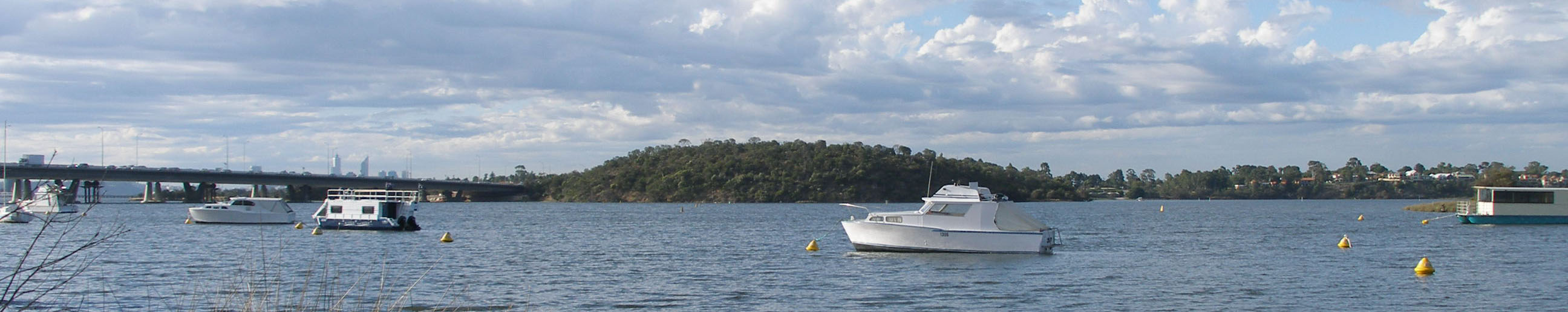
- Mount Henry, with Salter Point to the right.
- Interactive map of Salter Point
- Coordinates: 32°01′25″S 115°51′57″E
- Country: Australia
- State: Western Australia
- City: Perth
- LGA: City of South Perth

Government
  - State electorate: South Perth
  - Federal division: Swan

Area
  - Total: 1.6 km^{2} (0.62 sq mi)

Population
  - Total: 2,913 (SAL 2021)
- Postcode: 6152
Suburbs around Salter Point
	Como, Manning	Waterford
Canning River	Salter Point	Canning River
	Canning River

Salter Point is a suburb of Perth, Western Australia, located in the City of South Perth local government area.

Around 1880, Samuel August Salter (after whom Salter Point was named) worked as a sawyer and timber contractor on the peninsula. At the time, the area was completely undeveloped, surrounded by dense bush with no road access.

Salter established a landing stage on the point known as Salter's Landing, to which timber logs could be floated from where they were cut in Kelmscott and Jarrahdale for transportation to a mill by barge. Salter operated his business from this location for several years, leading to the area being renamed Salter Point.

Samuel August Salter (1849–1930) son of British migrants Samuel and Sarah Salter, and brother to Hannah. Hannah Buckingham (Salter) married Thomas Buckingham in 1871 and lived in Kelmscott.

In 1929 a road to the location was made. During the Great Depression, from around 1930 to 1933, up to 110 homeless people camped at Salter Point near what is now the Gentilli Way boatramp. The South Perth Road Board installed toilets and running water following an outbreak of typhoid at the camp. The residents lived in tents and shacks built out of old metal drums, relying on charity as there was little sustenance work available.

In 1955, the area comprising Manning, Mt Henry, Salter Point and Waterford was annexed to the South Perth Road Board from the Canning Road Board.

In 1990, the suburb's name Salter Point was gazetted.

The foreshore along the Canning River has been studied for management plans.

== Educational facilities ==
- Aquinas College, private boys' college, years 4–12

== Transport ==
=== Bus ===
- 30 Curtin University Bus Station to Perth Busport – serves Hope Avenue, Mount Henry Road and Gentilli Way
- 31 Salter Point to Perth Busport – serves Redmond Street, Unwin Crescent, Sulman Avenue and Klem Avenue

== General references ==
- Cecil C. Florey, Peninsula city: a social history of the City of South Perth, City of South Perth, 1995, p. 125-6.
- Heritage Council of Western Australia, Page 4 "Documentary Evidence"
- City of South Perth Municipal Heritage Inventory "Origin and Meaning of Street and Place Names" Updated September 2005 Page 87 - 88
