= Salini (surname) =

Salini is an Italian surname. Notable people with the surname include:

- Massimiliano Salini (born 1973), Italian politician
- Pietro Salini (born 1958), Italian businessman
- Rocco Salini (1931–2016), Italian physician and politician
- Tommaso Salini (1575–1625), Italian painter

== See also ==
- Webuild, formerly Salini Impregilo SpA, an Italian construction and civil engineering group
