= Narrows Bridge (Perth) =

Set of bridges in Perth, Western Australia

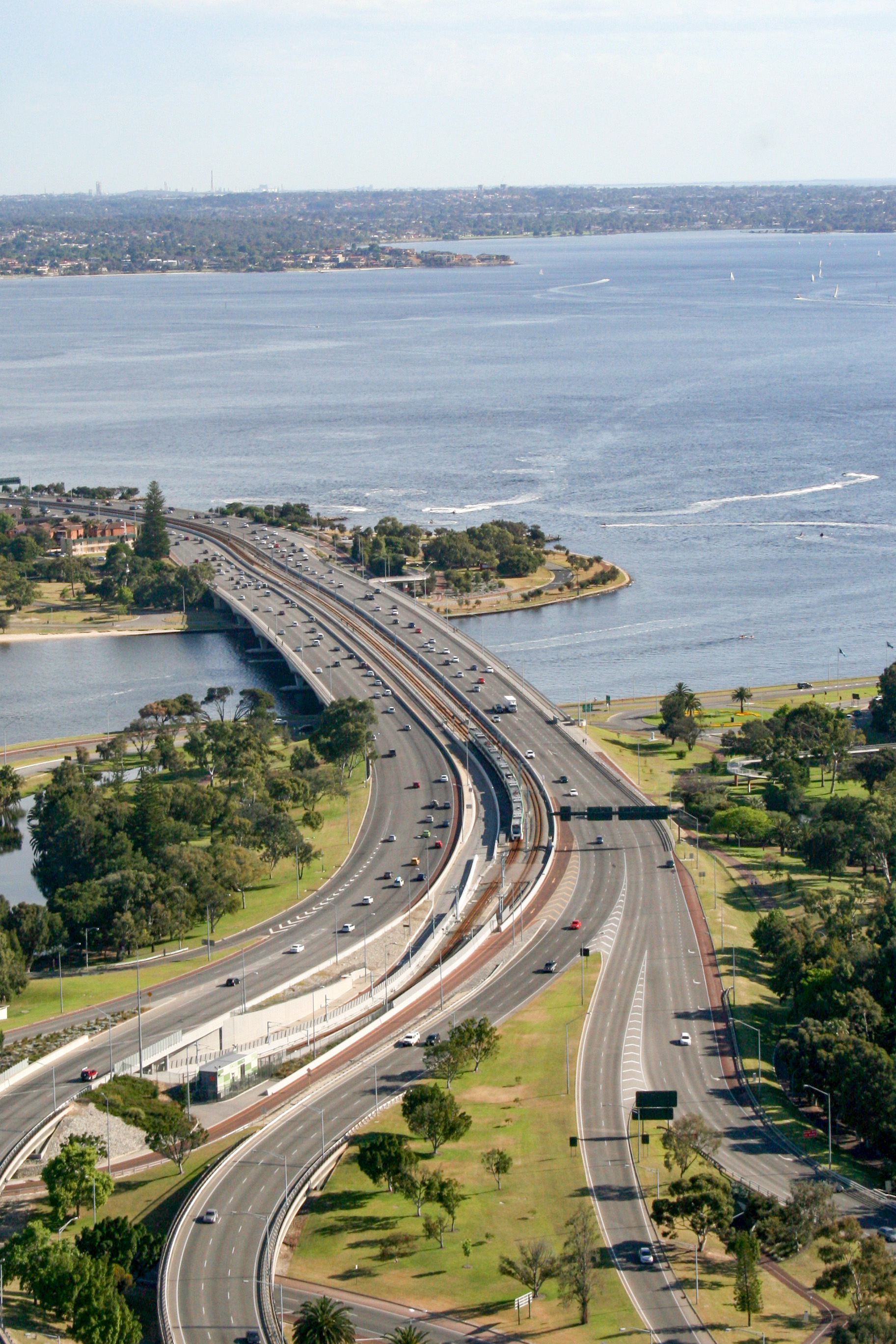
- The Narrows Bridge viewed from QV1, showing the two road bridges and railway bridge
- Coordinates: 31°57′48″S 115°50′49″E

Western Australia Heritage Register
- Type: State Registered Place
- Designated: 23 April 1999; 27 years ago
- Reference no.: 4795

Location
- Interactive map of Narrows Bridge

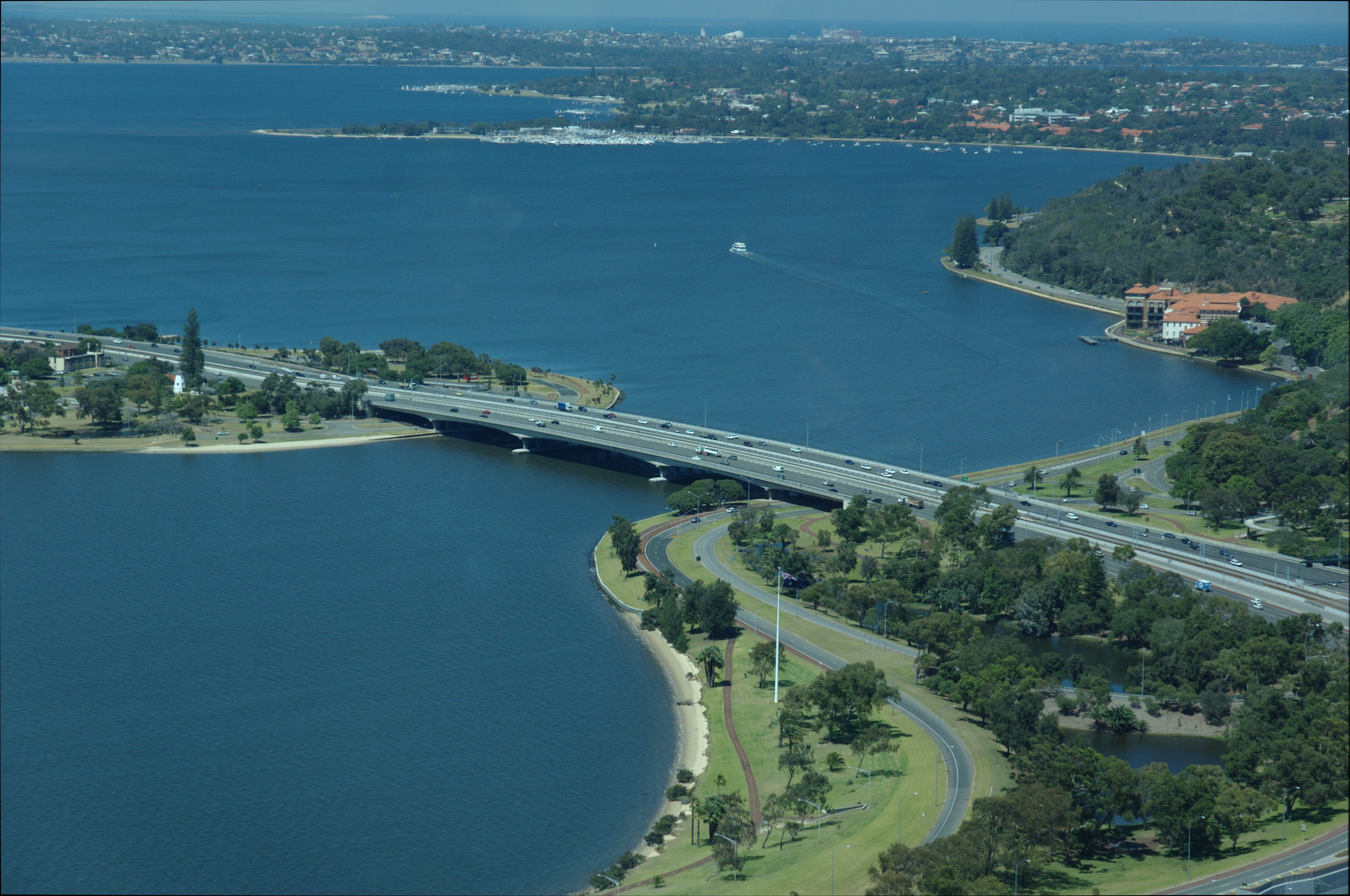
Narrows Bridge

The Narrows Bridge is a freeway and railway crossing of the Swan River in Perth, Western Australia. It directly links the Perth central business district to South Perth, and as the busiest crossing of the Swan River it is a major conduit between Perth's northern and southern suburbs.

The Narrows Bridge comprises two road bridges, which link the southern Kwinana Freeway and the northern Mitchell Freeway, and a railway bridge carrying the Mandurah railway line. It spans a portion of the river known as the Narrows, which separates Perth Water from Melville Water. The original road bridge was opened in 1959 and was the largest precast prestressed concrete bridge in the world. Construction of the northern interchange for this bridge necessitated the reclamation of a large amount of land from the river.

The bridge formed part of the Kwinana Freeway which originally ran for only 2.4 miles (3.9 km) to Canning Bridge. Over the following decades, the freeway system was expanded to the north and south, greatly increasing the volume of traffic using the bridge. As a result, in 2001, a second road bridge was opened to the west of the original bridge, and in 2005, the railway bridge was constructed in the gap between the two traffic bridges. Passenger trains first traversed the Narrows in 2007 with the opening of the Mandurah railway line.

== First road bridge: 1959 ==
Narrows Bridge Southbound
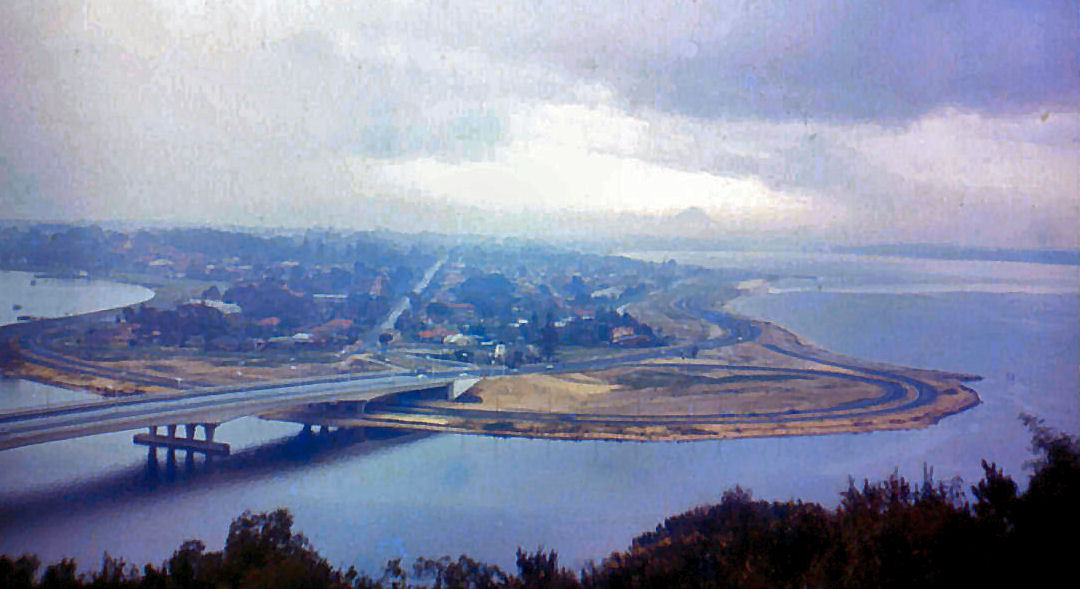
- The bridge viewed from Kings Park, c. 1959
- Coordinates: 31°57′48″S 115°50′49″E
- Carries: Kwinana Freeway (southbound road lanes)
- Crosses: Swan River
- Maintained by: Main Roads Western Australia
- Heritage status: WA Heritage Register
- Next upstream: Boorloo Bridge
- Next downstream: Stirling Bridge

Characteristics
- Material: Reinforced concrete
- Total length: 396.5 m (1,301 ft)
- Width: 27.4 m (90 ft)
- Longest span: 98 m (322 ft)
- No. of spans: 5
- Piers in water: 2

History
- Designer: Sir William Holford
- Construction start: 8 June 1957; 69 years ago
- Opened: 13 November 1959; 66 years ago

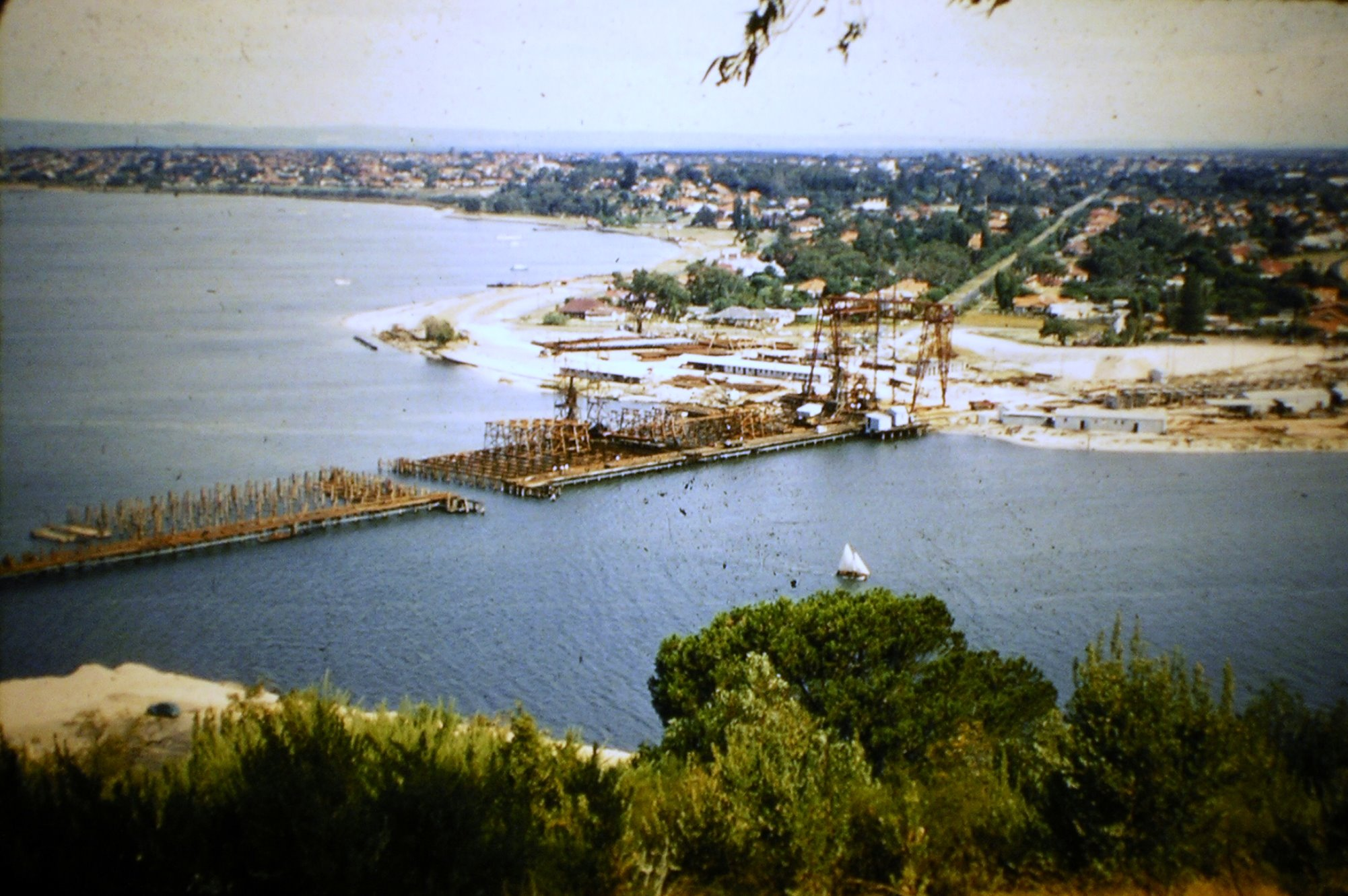
The original Narrows Bridge under construction, c. 1957

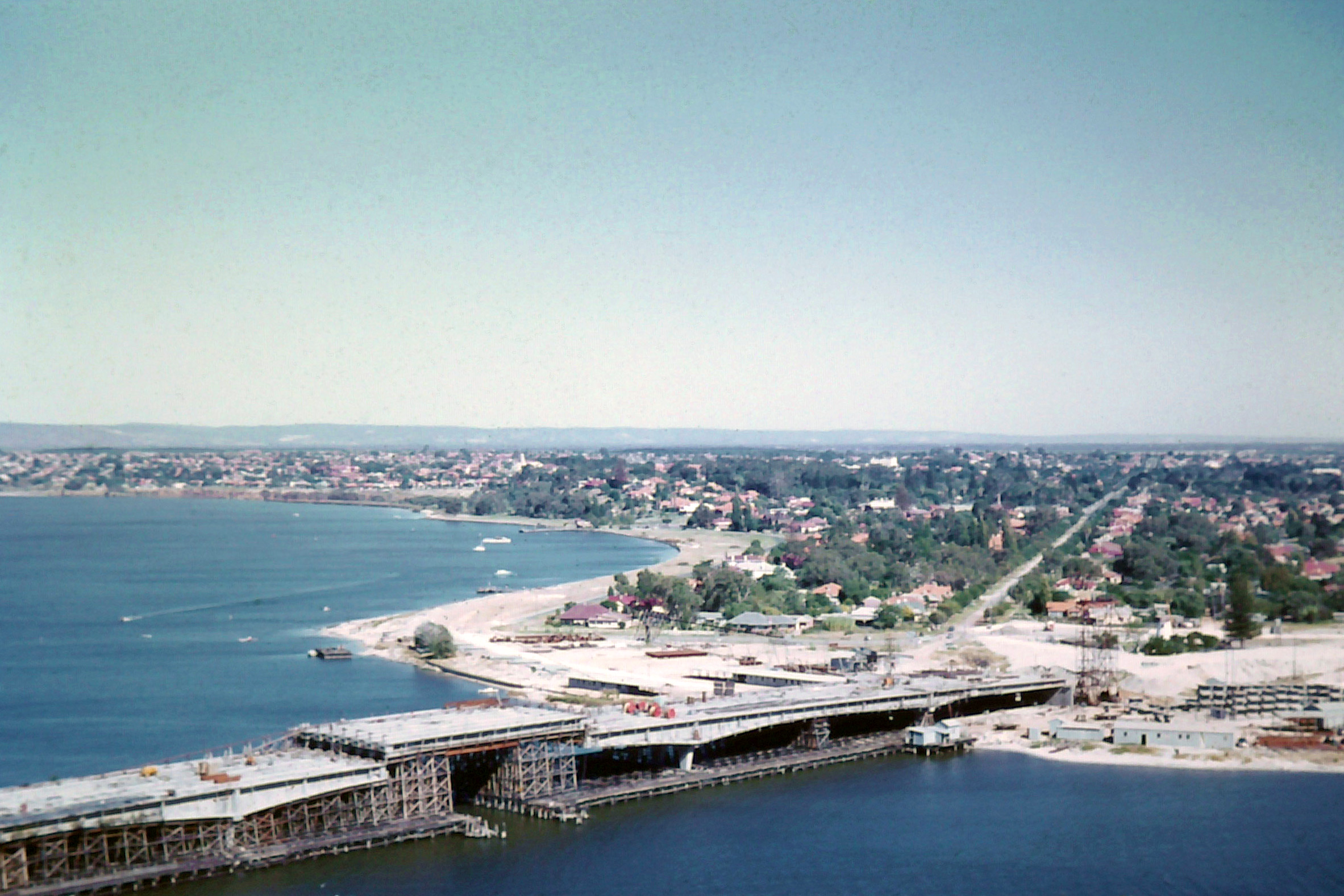
Narrows Bridge under construction c. 1958

The close distance between Mill Point and Point Lewis at the foot of Mount Eliza meant the site was suggested as a suitable location for a bridge as early as 1849. A bridge was proposed for the site in 1899, but its expected cost of £13,000 was deemed too high. Preliminary planning for a bridge at the site finally began in 1947, but was suspended so that a replacement for The Causeway could be built at Heirisson Island, at the city's eastern end. The new Causeway bridges were opened in 1952, and by 1954 traffic using them to enter the city had doubled, renewing calls for a bridge at the Narrows.

Site investigations for the bridge began in August 1954. The bridge was proposed for the Narrows site by the Town Planning Commission under the chairmanship of Harold Boas. The chosen site drew public protest on the basis that the bridge would spoil the view to and from the city. Also, residents of the wealthy Mill Point area were angry that they would have a major highway running beside their houses. The site also necessitated the reclamation of 60 acres (24 ha) of land from Mounts Bay for the bridge approach and interchange. This land reclamation, which started in October 1954, saw the addition of 3.4 million cubic metres (4.5 million cubic yards) of sand, much of which was dredged from Melville Water.

The state started saving for the new bridge in September 1954, and the construction of the bridge was approved by the Hawke state Labor government in November 1954, before the Hepburn-Stephenson metropolitan roads plan had been finalised, such was the urgency of a new traffic link. The construction of the bridge was subsequently endorsed in the 1955 Hepburn–Stephenson plan, which later developed into the Metropolitan Region Scheme.

The river bed at the site of the proposed bridge was not ideal for bridge building, with soft mud extending down as deep as 80 feet (24 m) and sand beds below that going a further 40 feet (12 m) down. Ernie Godfrey, a bridge engineer with the Main Roads Department, travelled overseas to inspect bridges in similar geological locations and to source a designer for the proposed bridge. The design contract for the bridge was won by British engineering firm Maunsell & Co.

Construction on the road system began in 1956, and the contract for construction of the bridge was signed by Commissioner of Main Roads J. Digby Leach on 16 March 1957. The bridge was built by Danish firm Christiani & Nielsen in conjunction with Western Australian engineering firm J. O. Clough & Son. Leif Ott Nilsen oversaw construction on behalf of Christiani & Nielsen. The first timber pile for the temporary staging for the construction was driven at noon on 8 June 1957. The first permanent pile for the bridge was driven home on 18 August 1957. Work on the bridge's precast concrete beams began in September 1957, and the first of these was lifted into place by the 60-foot (18 m) gantry crane in February 1958. The last river pile was driven home in November 1958, and the final concrete beam was lowered into position in June 1959. During construction on 10 February 1959, John Tonkin, then the Deputy Premier and Minister for Works, announced that the new bridge was to be named the Golden West Bridge. However, Golden West was also the name for a popular soft drink; the proposal encountered scorn from commentators and was quietly dropped.

The bridge cost £A 1.5 million, equivalent to A$51.8 million in 2022, as part of a wider road system costing £3.5 million. Construction of the bridge took two years and five months. It was officially opened by Governor Charles Gairdner on 13 November 1959. He unveiled a plaque on the bridge together with Premier David Brand, Commissioner of Main Roads J. Digby Leach and Works Minister Gerald Wild. Gairdner was also the first person to drive across the new bridge. It was hoped at this stage that the debt raised to pay for the bridge would be repaid by the Government within 12 months.

The bridge formed part of the new Kwinana Freeway, which originally ran 2.4 miles (3.9 km) from the Narrows to Canning Highway. This was described as the "most modern highway" in Western Australia, with a speed limit of 50 miles per hour (80 km/h). The bridge was also the largest precast prestressed concrete bridge in the world at the time of its opening.

=== Design ===
The bridge was jointly designed by engineering firm G. Maunsell & Partners and architects William Halford & Partners. The prestressed concrete design was relatively new for Western Australia, where road bridges had traditionally been built from timber frameworks. The bridge is arched along its length, with a vertical curve of up to 4% grade.

The unusually soft soil conditions at the site forced the use of 160 "Gambia piles" for the bridge's foundations, named after the country in which they were first used. The 31-inch (79 cm) diameter piles have steel shells and conical noses. The hollow piles were driven by a drop hammer falling within them, then when they had sufficient resistance to driving, they were filled with reinforced concrete.

The piles support two river piers, two shore piers and two abutments. The bridge's support columns on the piers were designed in a triangular form, larger at the top than at the bottom, each carrying two of the bridge's beams, so as to not completely obstruct the view through the bridge's piers. These columns support the bridge's five spans: a central span of 320 feet (98 m), two flanking spans of 230 feet (70 m) each and two smaller spans of 160 feet (49 m) at each end passing over roadways. The bridge has eight parallel lines of beams. Each line of beams consists of two cantilever spans 370 feet (110 m) long suspended between the shore and river piers, a central suspended span 140 feet (43 m) long between the two river piers, and two 110-foot (34 m) spans suspended over roadways at either end. Suspended between the beams of the bridge were 1 mile (1.6 km) of 30-inch (76 cm) water mains pipes and 0.5 miles (800 m) of 10.5-inch (27 cm) gas and drainage pipes.

Footpaths 8 feet (2.4 m) wide on either side of the bridge were formed by concrete cast in situ and cantilevered out from the adjacent beams. These footpaths were separated from the roadway and the bridge's edge by lightweight aluminium balustrades and safety fences installed by Bristile. The street lights were integrated into the safety fence.

The deck of the bridge was formed by pre-casting individual concrete units on the southern river shore, then hoisting them into place on temporary timber staging in the river. The units were then structurally joined by strands of high-tensile wire and stretched with a hydraulic jack. These pre-stressing strands were anchored in reinforced concrete blocks at the ends of the spans. The new bridge had a traffic capacity of 6,000 cars per hour in each direction, over a total of six traffic lanes.

=== Post-completion history ===
Strengthening works were carried out on the bridge by Structural Systems Ltd in 1996. Also in 1996, decorative night lighting was installed on each side of the bridge. The bridge was entered on the state's heritage register on 8 January 1999, and was named a national engineering landmark by the Institution of Engineers, Australia, in November 1999.

The opening of the southern regions of Perth to easier CBD access changed the nature of the metropolitan area, prompting dramatic population growth south of the river. This led to increased traffic on the bridge, causing regular traffic jams in peak hour. Over the years, governments suggested various ideas to reduce the traffic using the bridge, including introducing congestion pricing similar to that used in Singapore, charging vehicles to enter the central business district during peak periods. The government also encouraged voluntary car sharing. These efforts were largely unsuccessful, and by the 1990s, the bridge had become the city's worst traffic bottleneck, despite the addition of an extra traffic lane, bringing the total number of lanes to seven:

Peak-hour users of the freeway have become accustomed to driving into a bottle-neck every day. They also know that it takes only a minor bingle on the bridge to turn the freeway into a vast parking lot, inciting road rage symptoms and making thousands of people late for work.

— Journalist Andre Malan, The West Australian, 7 March 1998

== Second road bridge: 2001 ==
Narrows Bridge Northbound
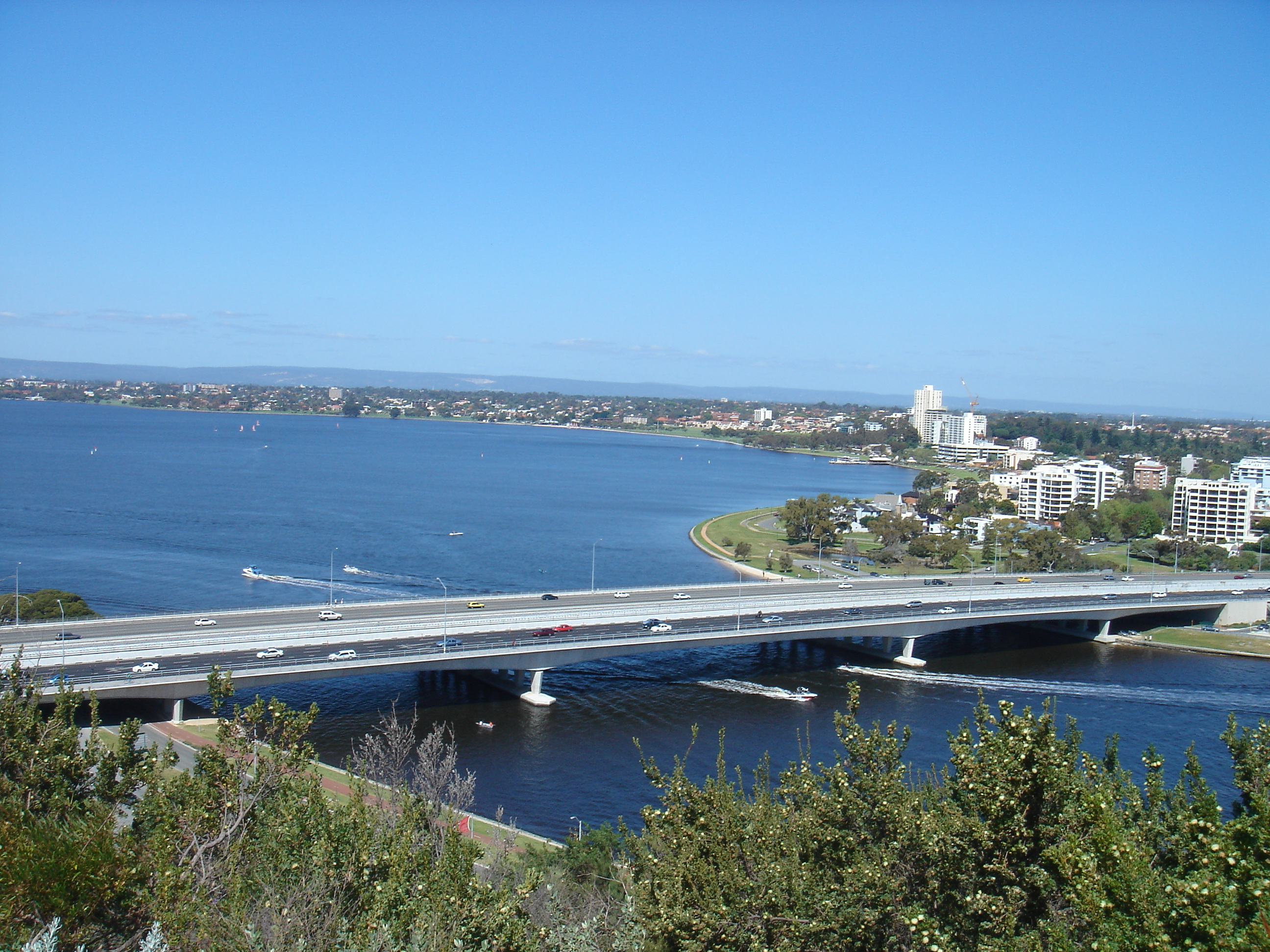
- The duplicate bridge seen here in the foreground, with the darker road surface.
- Coordinates: 31°57′48″S 115°50′49″E
- Carries: Kwinana Freeway (northbound road lanes); Northbound railway line
- Crosses: Swan River
- Maintained by: Main Roads Western Australia

Plans for a second Narrows Bridge were mooted during the 1970s, but did not eventuate. By 1998, the original bridge was carrying 155,000 vehicles per day, with an average of 2,700 cars per lane between 7:30 am and 8:30 am, and was thought to be the busiest section of freeway in Australia. This quantity of traffic far outstripped the expected capacity of the bridge when it opened in 1959. In 1998, The road planners' most favoured solution to the traffic problem was to widen the existing bridge by building a smaller second traffic bridge just west of it and joining their decks to form a contiguous roadway. This would increase the number of traffic lanes from seven to ten. The widening was expected to cost $50 million.

A plan to widen the Narrows Bridge was announced on 13 April 1998 by the Court Liberal State Government. The $70 million plan would involve the addition of four extra traffic lanes, and was part of a $230 million package upgrading and extending the southern end of the Kwinana Freeway. Alannah MacTiernan, then the Opposition transport spokesperson, attacked the plan, saying that the government should instead build a railway to Rockingham.

Instead of widening the existing structure, the Minister for Transport, Eric Charlton, on 15 July 1998 approved the construction of a separate second road bridge alongside the original Narrows Bridge; this solution would cost $15 million less, due to new building techniques, and would be less disruptive to traffic on the existing bridge. The construction of a separate bridge was also deemed necessary because the foundations of any new structure might settle in the soft river bed at a different rate from the existing bridge. Under the plan, there would be six lanes on each bridge, including a bus lane on each. The new bridge would run parallel to the original bridge and be separated from it by a gap of 6 metres (20 ft), and was designed to look largely the same as the original.

Main Roads called for tenders for the bridge widening in July 1998, and on 7 March 1999 it was announced that the building contract had been awarded to Leighton Contractors. The negotiated contract price was reduced to $49 million, equivalent to $91.2 million in 2022, owing to the construction method proposed by Leighton. The designers were Connell Wagner.

The bridge was constructed by the incremental launching technique, with 28-metre (92 ft) segments pre-cast on both shores and pushed out into place as the construction progressed. The bridge was divided into two strips lengthways, with the eastern half launched separately from the western half, and the two decks were later joined at the bridge's centre line. The first of twelve segments was launched in February 2000.

As it was being launched, the bridge rested on temporary piles; only after the structure was fully launched were these piles removed and the bridge allowed to rest on its permanent supports. The construction required the driving of around 250 steel piles; the first was driven on 10 August 1999.

Construction of the second bridge was interrupted several times by strikes, as well as by an algal bloom in the Swan River. The bridge was finally opened to traffic on 26 February 2001, and officially opened by new Transport Minister Alannah MacTiernan (a strident critic of the project) on 30 May 2001. The bridge had originally been planned to be opened in August 2000, and was expected to carry 80,000 cars per day. The new traffic bridge carried six lanes of traffic, including one bus lane, and the original bridge was modified at this time to carry six traffic lanes, as designed.

== Railway bridge: 2005 ==
Narrows Rail Bridge
- Coordinates: 31°57′48″S 115°50′49″E
- Carries: Southbound railway line
- Crosses: Swan River

Characteristics
- No. of spans: 5
- Piers in water: 2

History
- Opened: 23 December 2007; 18 years ago

During the construction of the second road bridge, the construction of the Mandurah railway line through Perth's southern suburbs to Rockingham and Mandurah became a political issue. The incumbent Liberal state government proposed building a railway from Kenwick to connect to the Kwinana Freeway, running in the centre of the freeway for only part of its journey. The Labor opposition instead wanted to build the railway across the Narrows Bridge and down most of the length of the freeway.

After the Labor party won the 2001 state election, it reversed the previous government's position and started planning for the installation of railway tracks across the Narrows Bridge. The construction of a third bridge was needed due to the lack of previous planning provisions when the second bridge was constructed. Leighton Constructions won the contract to build the freeway stage of the railway line and set about constructing a narrow southbound railway bridge in the 6-metre (20 ft) gap between the existing road bridges. The designers of "Package E" of the Southern Suburbs Railway (which included the Narrows Rail Bridge) were GHD, Coffey Geosciences and Wyche Consulting. The eastern side of the existing northbound (2001) bridge was also strengthened to accommodate the northbound railway track. Construction was due to start in July 2005 and completion was expected by December 2005. The first passengers traversed the Narrows on 23 December 2007 with the opening of the Mandurah line.

The railway bridge deck was made from nine steel girders each weighing up to 99.5 tonnes (219,000 lb) and up to 54 metres (177 ft) long. These girders were built in Kwinana, brought to the site by road and lowered into position with a crane.

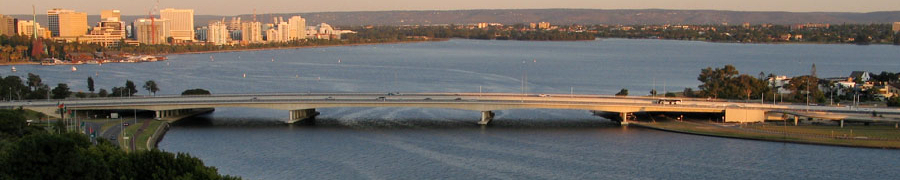
The bridges viewed from the west at sunset.

== Sources ==
- Engineering Heritage Panel (August 2009), Swan & Canning Rivers Bridges (PDF), Australian Engineering Week Tour 2009, West Perth: Engineers Australia, Wikidata Q141890138, archived from the original (PDF) on 2 April 2015
  - Young, Don (2009). "Narrows Bridge (1959)". In Engineering Heritage Panel (2009), pp. 6–8.
- Gregory, Jenny (2003). City of Light: A History of Perth Since the 1950s. Perth: City of Perth. ISBN 0-9594632-5-9. LCCN 2005440691. OCLC 54781434. OL 3465933M. Wikidata Q133458669.
- Seddon, George; Ravine, David (1986). A City and its Setting: Images of Perth, Western Australia. Fremantle: Fremantle Press. ISBN 0-949206-08-3. LCCN 87131959. OCLC 16866226. OL 2438825M. Wikidata Q135222492.
- Staff writer (13 November 1959). "The Narrows Bridge Opens Today". The West Australian.
