= Fremantle Bridge =

Fremantle Bridge can refer to:

- Walyalup Bridge, formerly known as Fremantle Traffic Bridge
- Fremantle Railway Bridge

== See also ==
- Stirling Bridge
