= Victoria Park, Western Australia =

Victoria Park
- Suburb
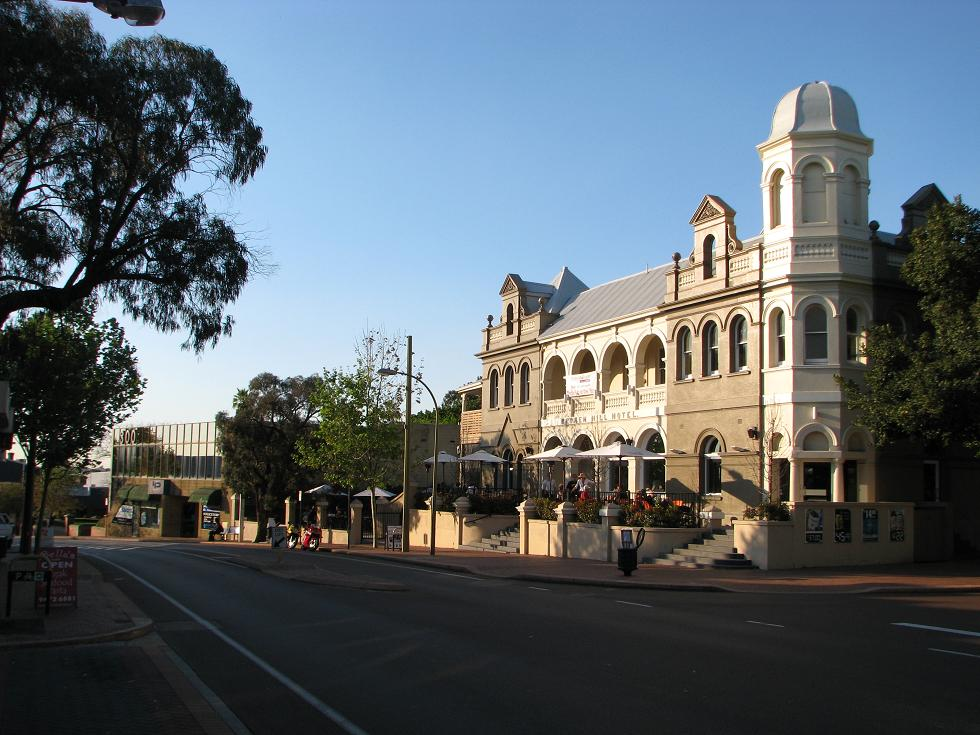
- The Broken Hill Hotel on Albany Highway in central Victoria Park
- Interactive map of Victoria Park
- Coordinates: 31.969°S 115.896°E
- Country: Australia
- State: Western Australia
- City: Perth
- LGA: Town of Victoria Park
- Location: 3 km (1.9 mi) from Perth
- Established: 1870s

Government
  - State electorate: Victoria Park
  - Federal division: Swan

Area
  - Total: 2.6 km^{2} (1.0 sq mi)

Population
  - Total: 9,334 (SAL 2021)
- Postcode: 6100
Suburbs around Victoria Park
Swan River	Burswood	Lathlain
Kensington	Victoria Park	Carlisle
Kensington	East Victoria Park	East Victoria Park

Victoria Park (nicknamed Vic Park) is an inner suburb of Perth, the capital of the Australian state of Western Australia. It is located on the Swan River south-east of East Perth, and is linked to East Perth and the Perth central business district via The Causeway and Boorloo Bridge, which crosses Heirisson Island.

Victoria Park is mostly residential, with parkland on the Swan River and a commercial strip around Albany Highway. The suburb contains the intersection of three major arterial roads: Albany Highway, Canning Highway, and Great Eastern Highway. Its local government area is the Town of Victoria Park.

== History ==
The suburb of Victoria Park derives its name from "Victoria Park Estate", a development that took place there in the 1890s. It is believed the name was given to the estate because Queen Victoria was still on the throne, although it may be connected with Victoria Park in Melbourne.

The area was originally the largest portion of a grant of 972 acres (393 ha) to John Butler in 1831. Progress and development was initially very slow, but a few houses were built around coach stops on the Albany Road, initially constructed from hand-sawn wooden logs. The road was rebuilt in the early 1860s by convicts. At this time the entire area from Canning Bridge to Belmont was simply known as "Canning".

During the colonial period, the Victoria Park end of The Causeway was used as an occasional venue for public executions. Four men were executed in that manner in 1855, including two Indigenous men convicted of murder whose bodies were taken to York to be gibbeted (publicly displayed) as a warning to other Indigenous people.

In 1886, a settlement started at "2 Mile Spring", opposite the present location of the Broken Hill Hotel, with residential subdivision beginning in 1887. The South Western Railway linking Perth to Pinjarra was finished in 1893 and a population influx from the Western Australian gold rushes saw extensive development commence. The Victoria Park Road District was gazetted in 1894 and granted municipality status in 1897, at which point it had a population of 1,197 residents and 350 dwellings.

The Victoria Park railway station opened in 1898 following lobbying from the municipal council. The following year, Broken Hill Hotel and the Town Hall were constructed, serving as both a community centre and as the council office for the municipal council until amalgamation with the City of Perth in 1917. The Town Hall was later demolished, while the Broken Hill Hotel is listed by the National Trust.

A tram service commenced in 1905, and by 1917 the population had reached 5,000 residents, and had at their disposal electric lighting, a public library (1903), police station (1906), Victoria Park Post Office (1912), bowling club (1913) and two hotels, as well as several banks and numerous commercial enterprises and factories. After World War I, Albany Highway was bitumenised, and the commercial centre on either side of the road grew to rival centres in more established areas.

While by 1937 considered a "working man's district", by the mid-1970s the area had a higher-than-average elderly population according to ABS statistics, and the development of townhouses in place of some of the original dwellings saw increasing gentrification as city workers settled in areas closer to the Perth central business district.

=== The Causeway ===
The Causeway bridge was the first major bridge engineering project in or about Perth, and involved augmenting the Heirisson mudflats into a proper island. The mudflats were at that time an important resource for the Noongar people.

The current bridge is the third in that location. It was originally opened in 1843, then largely rebuilt after disastrous floods in 1862, and reopened in 1867. It was improved several times in 1899, 1903, 1933 and 1943, then completely rebuilt from 1947 and reopened in 1952.

== Geography ==
Victoria Park is bounded by the Swan River to the northwest, Shepperton Road, Harper Street and the Armadale railway line to the northeast, Miller and Kent Streets to the southeast and a line 61 metres (200 ft) southwest of Berwick Street to the southwest. The suburb is mostly residential, although Albany Highway is a commercial "high street" and a number of parks can be found – most notably McCallum Park on the river, Raphael Park and the smaller Read Park and Hawthorne Park.

== Demographics ==
At the 2021 Australian census, Victoria Park had a population of 9,334 people living in 4,940 dwellings. Over half (52.6%) of Victoria Park's residents rented their dwellings, compared to just 27.3% of people in Western Australia. 30.4% of residents reported English ancestry, with the other most common ancestries being Australian (21.9%), Irish (9.4%), Scottish (8.6%), and Chinese (7.8%). 64% spoke only English at home. The most common religious affiliations were Catholic (17.1%), Hinduism (6.5%), and Anglican (5.3%). 43.9% had no religious affiliation.

== Transport ==
Victoria Park is a major transit route, being the intersection point of Canning Highway to South Perth, Applecross and Fremantle; Great Eastern Highway to Belmont and Perth Airport; Albany Highway to Cannington and Armadale; and the Causeway to Perth's CBD. Albany Highway runs through the suburb as a main shopping street.

Victoria Park is home to Victoria Park railway station and is served by both the Armadale and Thornlie–Cockburn lines. The station is located about 6km from the CBD. The current Victoria Park Station was rebuilt in 2008 and the old station has since been demolished. During the Armadale/Thornlie Line Shutdown from November 2023 to June 2025, as part of Metronet works along the line, Victoria Park railway station was the terminus of the line. The station was served by bus route 908 which acted as a Rail replacement bus service to Cannington Station. The Armadale Line (between Perth and Cannington Station) reopened on 9 June 2025, along with the extended Thornlie Line to Cockburn Central Station. The rest of the Armadale Line and extension to Byford reopened on 13 October 2025.

In December 2024, the Boorloo Bridge was opened, providing a pedestrian and cycling link to the Perth CBD that bypasses the Causeway. Construction began in March 2023.

== Sport ==
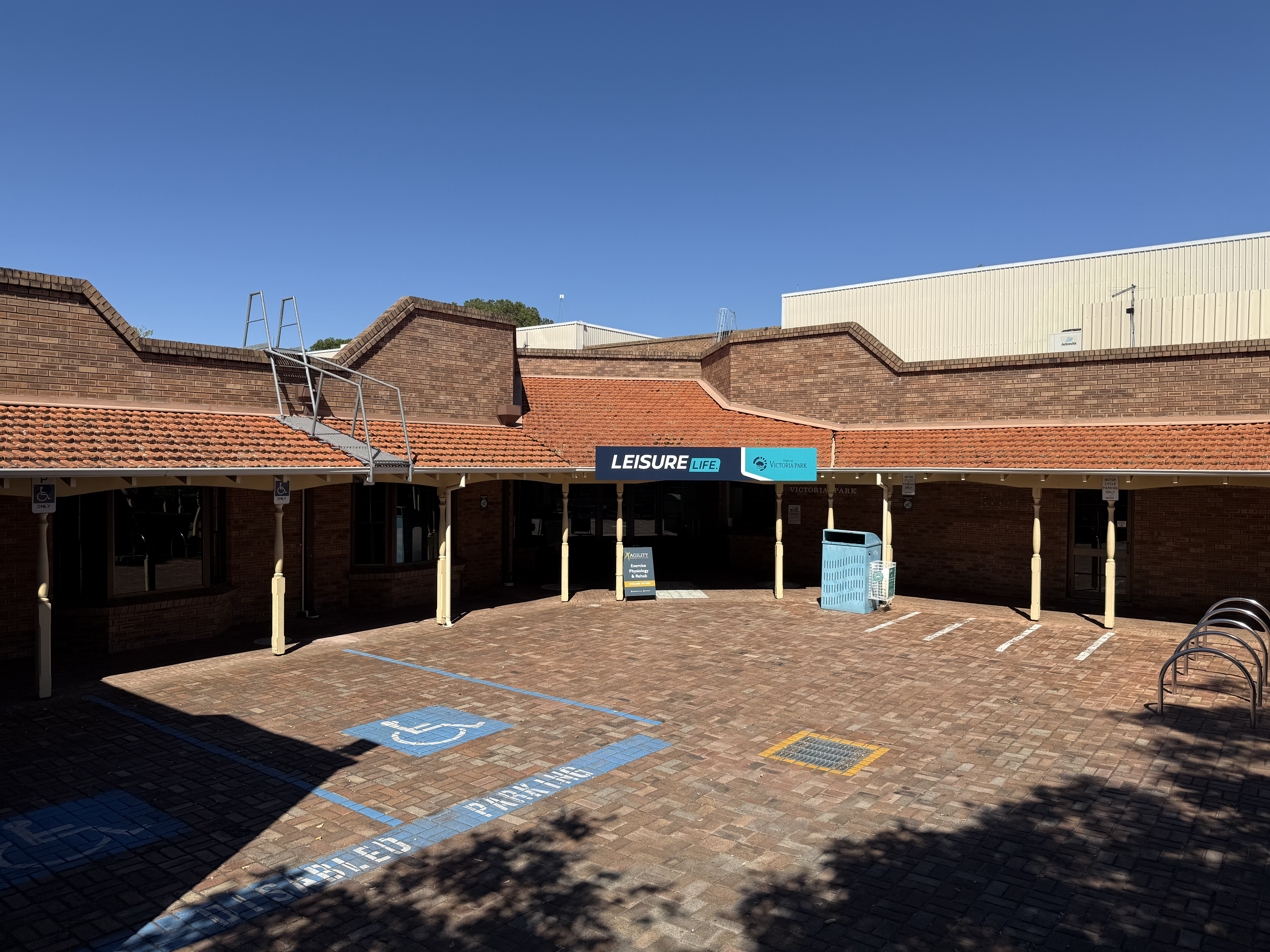
Leisurelife Centre, February 2025

Victoria Park's Leisurelife Centre hosts the club administration office of the Perth Basketball Association. The venue contains three basketball courts.

== Politics ==
Victoria Park's only booth, Homestead Seniors Centre, is marginal at federal level, and supports the Australian Labor Party at state elections. Nearby booths in East Victoria Park consistently support the Australian Labor Party at both levels of government.

== Notable people ==
- Pat Hawkins – world-record breaking cyclist
