= Pat Hawkins =

Pat Hawkins is the name of

- Pat Hawkins (cyclist) (1921–1991), Australian endurance cyclist
- Pat Hawkins (hurdler) (born 1950), American hurdler and sprinter
