= The Causeway =

Road bridge in Perth, Western Australia

The Causeway Western Australia

General information
- Type: Road
- Length: 1.1 km (0.7 mi)
- Opened: 1843
- Route number(s): State Route 5

Major junctions
- Northwest end: Riverside Drive (State Route 5); Adelaide Terrace; Hay Street
- Southeast end: Shepperton Road (State Route 30); Great Eastern Highway (National Highway 94 / National Route 1); Canning Highway (National Route 1 / State Route 6); Albany Highway

Location(s)
- Major suburbs: East Perth, Victoria Park

Western Australia Heritage Register
- Type: State Registered Place
- Designated: 30 October 1998
- Reference no.: 3631

The Causeway is an arterial traffic crossing in Perth, Western Australia, linking the inner-city suburbs of East Perth and Victoria Park. It is carried over the Swan River at the eastern end of Perth Water by two bridges on either side of Heirisson Island. The current Causeway is the third structure to have been built across the river at this point.

Originally the site of mudflats which restricted river navigation, the colony government constructed a causeway and bridge across the site. The project was first planned in 1834 and opened in 1843. When floods in 1862 almost destroyed it, the structure was rebuilt using convict labour, and raised to better withstand future floods. Governor John Hampton officially opened the new Causeway on 12 November 1867. Over the following decades, the three bridges making up this second Causeway were widened several times, and they were eventually replaced in 1952.

The current Causeway bridges were designed by E W C Godfrey, and built between 1947 and 1952. They were the first in Western Australia to use steel composite construction. Large roundabouts were also constructed at each end of the structure, to improve the flow of traffic. The opening of the Graham Farmer Freeway in 2000 reduced the traffic volume on the Causeway, allowing the two central lanes to be turned into bus lanes. By the early 2000s, the concrete structures had suffered significant damage. Cracks were repaired using carbon fibre reinforcement and localised patching, extending the bridge's life by decades. The Causeway bridges have been recognised for their heritage value by their entry on the Western Australian Register of Heritage Places.

== History ==
Following the settlement of the Swan River Colony in 1829, the Swan River was the main transportation link between Perth and the port of Fremantle. Land transportation was difficult as the only river crossing near Perth, a ford at the eastern end of the town, was often impassable for wagons and carts. The next crossing point was 32 kilometres (20 mi) upstream at Guildford, a major detour. The only alternative to these river crossings were ferries, which operated from North Fremantle, Preston Point, and the Narrows.

=== First Causeway ===
Soon after the colony was founded, settlers lobbied for the construction of a road across the mudflats in the Swan River at the eastern end of the town. A preliminary survey of the site was conducted in 1834 by the Commissioner for Roads and Bridges, George Fletcher Moore, together with Surveyor General John Septimus Roe. A public meeting on 17 February 1837 passed a resolution urging the colony's government to construct the road at the site, and Roe showed the public plans for the proposed causeway. A year later, in January 1838, the Perth Gazette noted that preliminary work had been carried out towards building the Causeway, which is thought to have been the upgrading of Adelaide Terrace from the "bush track" it was previously.

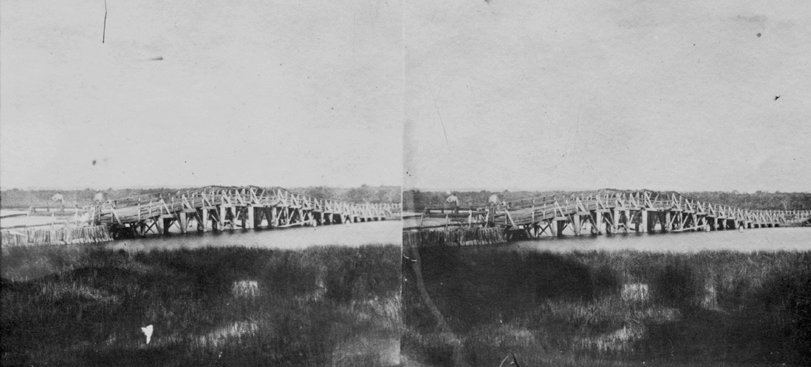
Stereoscopic photograph of the original Perth Bridge taken c. 1862

A committee was set up in October 1838 to investigate the viability of a causeway at the site. On 16 February 1839 plans which had been prepared by Roe were submitted by the committee's chairman to Henry Trigg, the Superintendent of Public Works. Trigg called for other plans and prepared estimates. At a meeting of the committee on 27 February 1839, Trigg submitted a plan designed by Frederick Irwin, which was estimated to cost £2,300, equivalent to A$280,900 in 2022. The committee cut the estimated figure to £1,800, equivalent to A$219,900 in 2022, and waited for Governor Hutt to specify how much could be funded by the government.

This original causeway consisted of a central bridge (for river navigation), with a raised rampart on either side. The first pile of the central bridge was driven home on 2 November 1840. The bridge was completed in 1841, costing £449 10s, equivalent to A$54,900 in 2022, although the approaches to the bridge took longer to complete. The Causeway was sufficiently completed in January 1842 to be used by horsemen, and the Causeway was finally finished in May 1843 at a total cost of £1,814 10s, equivalent to A$271,400 in 2022. It was officially opened on 24 May 1843 by J. W. Hardey, the chairman of the Road Trust, in the presence of only one other person, one of his friends.

The Causeway was originally a toll road, and costs for crossing ranged from one penny (1d), equivalent to A$0.62 in 2022, for a person on foot to six pence (6d), equivalent to A$3.74 in 2022, for a horse-drawn cart. The tolls were subject to an additional levy of 50 per cent during the night hours. The tolls were later removed, and it appears to have been Perth's only toll road.

=== Second Causeway ===
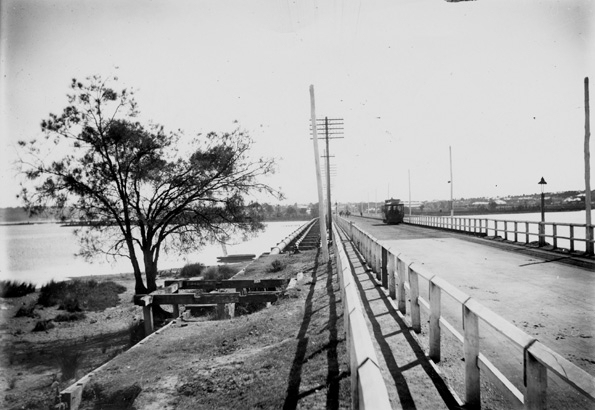
The second Causeway with a tram, viewed from the Perth side

In June 1862 major flooding was experienced in many towns in the region, resulting in losses over £30,000, equivalent to A$4.3 million in 2022. In Perth, Mounts Bay Road was completely submerged, and the original causeway was almost destroyed after being under 2.1 or 2.4 metres (7 or 8 ft) of water. However, Governor John Hampton ordered that the Causeway should be reconstructed and raised several feet. The new Causeway was designed by Richard Roach Jewell and built by convicts.

The opening of the newly refurbished Causeway was a more pompous affair than that of the first Causeway. The second Causeway was to be opened by the Duke of Edinburgh, Prince Alfred; however the Royal Navy ship HMS Galatea failed to call in to Western Australia on its way to Sydney. As a result, the Governor proceeded with the opening in the Duke's absence. On 12 November 1867 the Governor drove "through an avenue of flags and bunting" from Government House to the Causeway. There were military corps, a band and a great crowd present for the opening. After speeches by dignitaries, the Governor declared the new Causeway open with the following words:

I, John Stephen Hampton, Governor in and over the Colony of Western Australia, do hereby declare this Perth Bridge and Causeway open for traffic.

The proceedings were then disrupted when a man "raced across the newly-opened bridge before the Governor's procession" on horseback after announcing the following to the astonished crowd:

And I, John Stephen Maley, do hereby declare that I will be the first to cross this Perth Bridge and Causeway!

The parade, including the Governor's carriage, then proceeded over the new Causeway after Maley. The Governor's procession continued on steam boats upstream to Guildford where the Governor opened the new Guildford and Helena Bridges.

This second Causeway was made up of three bridges with a combined length of 488 metres (1,600 ft). Budget constraints encountered during construction meant that the bridges were structurally quite weak. A maximum of 2 tonnes (4,480 lb), or six head of cattle, was initially allowed across at a time.

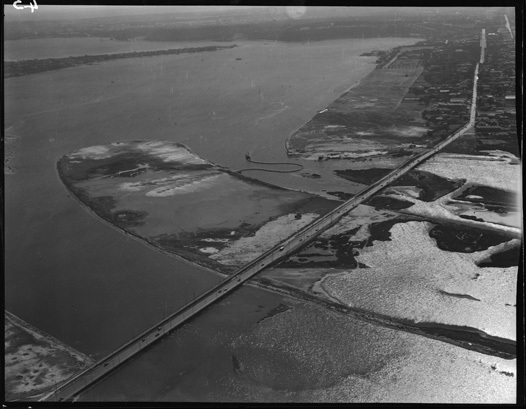
The Causeway and Heirisson Island, pictured in 1935

This Causeway was modified several times during its life. In 1899 it was widened by the addition of a footpath, while by 1904 it had been strengthened and widened by an average of 2.9 metres (9 ft 6 in). In June 1905 the Causeway was placed under the control of the Minister for Works. From 1932 to 1933 the Causeway bridges were widened a further 3 metres (10 ft) on their downstream side, which increased the total width to 11 metres (37 ft).

=== Third Causeway ===
Crossing the Causeway, from Riverside Drive to Canning Highway

Plans to build a new bridge at the Narrows downstream from the Causeway in the aftermath of World War II were put on hold while a new causeway could be constructed. Vehicle traffic using the Causeway had almost doubled between 1930 and 1939.

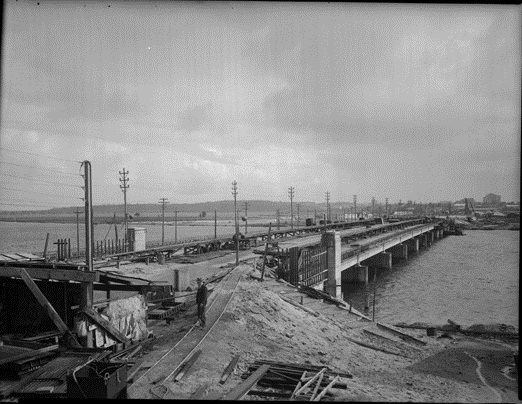
The third Causeway Bridge under construction

The current Causeway was built between 1947 and 1952, and designed by E. W. C. Godfrey. It is made up of two bridges, meeting at Heirisson Island. Considerable work was carried out to dredge the river to provide much wider navigation channels. The Heirisson Islands were turned into a single island and a substantial portion of land beside Trinity College was reclaimed.

The bridges were the "first truly modern bridges" built in Perth after World War II, being the first bridges in Western Australia to use steel composite construction, and only the second (and third) in Australia. The bridges have a combined length of 341 metres (1,119 ft), with both featuring a 19-metre-wide (62 ft) roadway allowing for six traffic lanes, and an 2.4-metre-wide (8 ft) footway on the western side. In order to achieve a sufficiently high clearance above the river channels at high tide, the bridges have graded approaches that increase the roadway elevation.

The south-eastern bridge is the longer of the two, at 225 metres (737 ft) long. It is made up of 11 spans, each consisting of nine welded plate girders, with a 10-metre (33 ft) relieving span at each end. The north-western bridge is shorter, at only 116 metres (382 ft) in length, and has five spans, with a 11-metre (35 ft) relieving span at each end. The bridge decks are of reinforced concrete supported by the plate girders, which are in turn freely supported by the concrete piers.

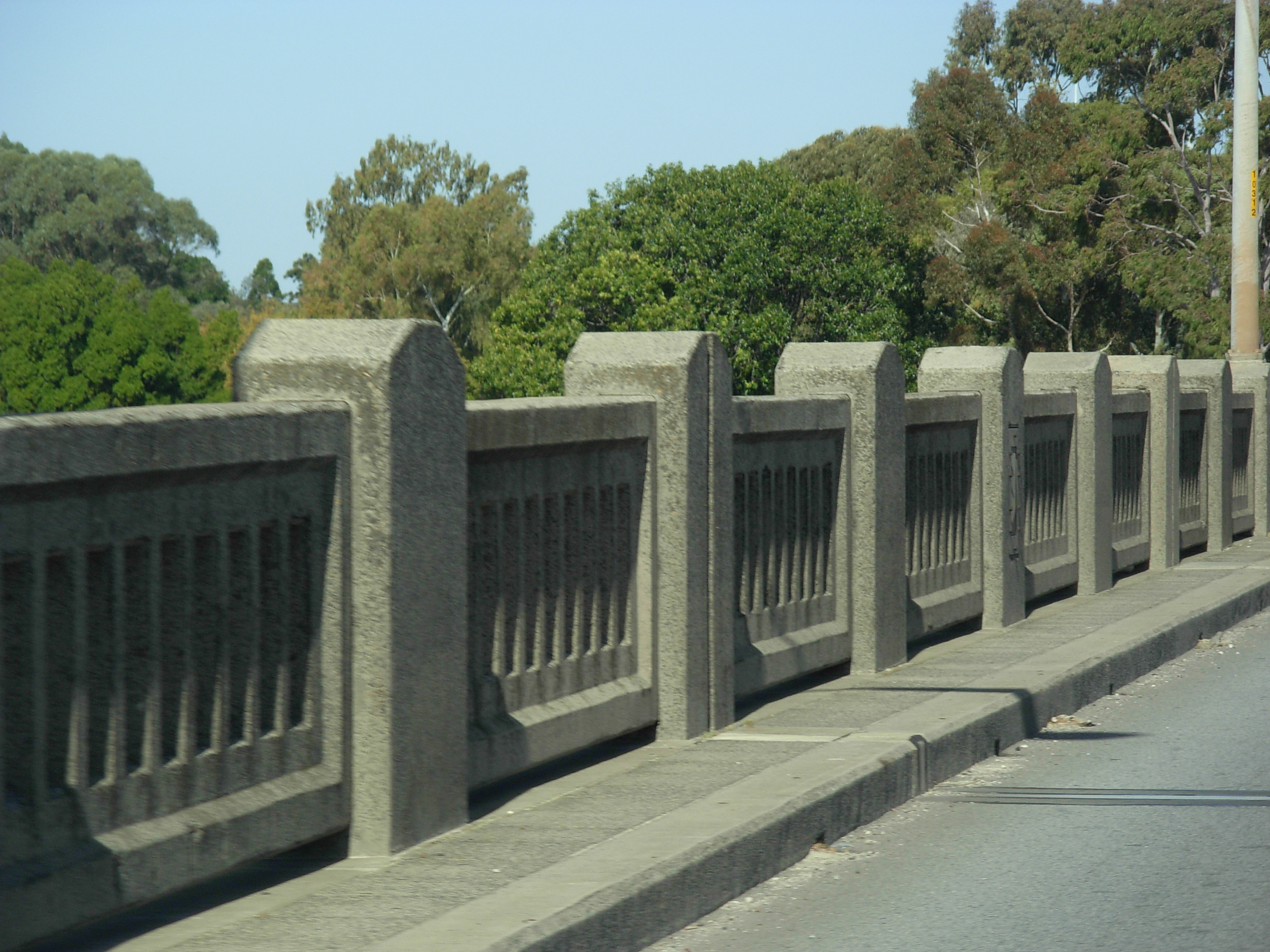
Concrete railing along eastern side of roadway

Supply problems in the aftermath of World War II meant that the concrete piers were founded on jarrah timber piles, rather than concrete. Additionally, a steel plate shortage forced the bridge's designers to avoid the use of steel to design the forms in the bridge's superstructure. Also, the cement that was used on the bridges had to be procured from seven different sources, which led to variable durability of different parts of the bridges.

The previous Causeway had carried electric trams, and it was expected that the new Causeway would also do so, or perhaps trolleybuses instead. However, the proposed overhead wires were deemed too ugly for the new bridge, and between £A 30,000 and £A 40,000, equivalent to between A$2.3 million and A$3.1 million in 2022, could be saved by using buses instead. The tram routes using the Causeway were replaced with bus services but, despite that, the bridges were designed to be able to carry trams.

The south-eastern bridge was the first to be completed, and was opened on 19 September 1952, with traffic continuing to use the other two bridges of the previous Causeway. Work then continued on the north-western bridge with further reclamation of land.

Roundabouts were constructed at each end of the Causeway, to improve the flow of traffic on the bridges and the distribution of traffic back into the road network. The eastern roundabout opened in 1952, while the western one did not open until December 1954. Guides on the usage of the roundabouts were published in newspapers. In 1973, construction began on a grade-separated partial cloverleaf interchange at the eastern end of the Causeway. The A$1.3 million interchange opened on 8 March 1974.

By 1954, traffic entering the city by the Causeway had doubled, leading to renewed calls for a new bridge further west at the Narrows. That bridge was eventually built as the Narrows Bridge, which opened in 1959. The Narrows and the Causeway continued to be the only road crossings of the Swan River between Fremantle and Maylands until the Windan Bridge of the Graham Farmer Freeway opened in 2000. The opening of the latter eastern bypass coincided with the conversion of the Causeway's two centre lanes to bus lanes. It also reduced traffic levels on the Causeway from 107,000 cars per day to 70,000 within six months. The western roundabout, the state's worst black spot since 1989, was also remodelled in 2000 into a traffic light-controlled raindrop roundabout, in conjunction with the other works on the Causeway.

The variable-quality of the cement which had been used in the construction of the Causeway bridges meant that, by the early 2000s, they had suffered significant damage. A repair contract was awarded to Kulin Group in 2004. Localised patching of cracks in the piers was undertaken. At the ends of the piers, the cracking was more substantial and had to be tied back with carbon fibre reinforcement. Repairs were then treated with a moisture-resistant coating, and were expected to lengthen the life of the bridges by decades.

The Causeway bridges received an interim entry on the Western Australian Register of Heritage Places on 30 June 1998, which was made permanent on 30 October 1998. They were also classified by the National Trust on 8 June 1998.

In March 2023, construction on the Boorloo Bridge 90 metres (300 ft) downstream began, to allow pedestrians and cyclists to bypass the narrow footpath along the Causeway.

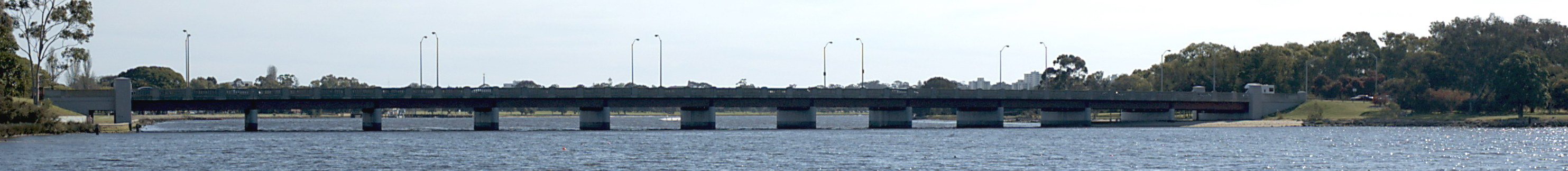
Southeastern section of the Causeway viewed from Burswood Park

== Route description ==
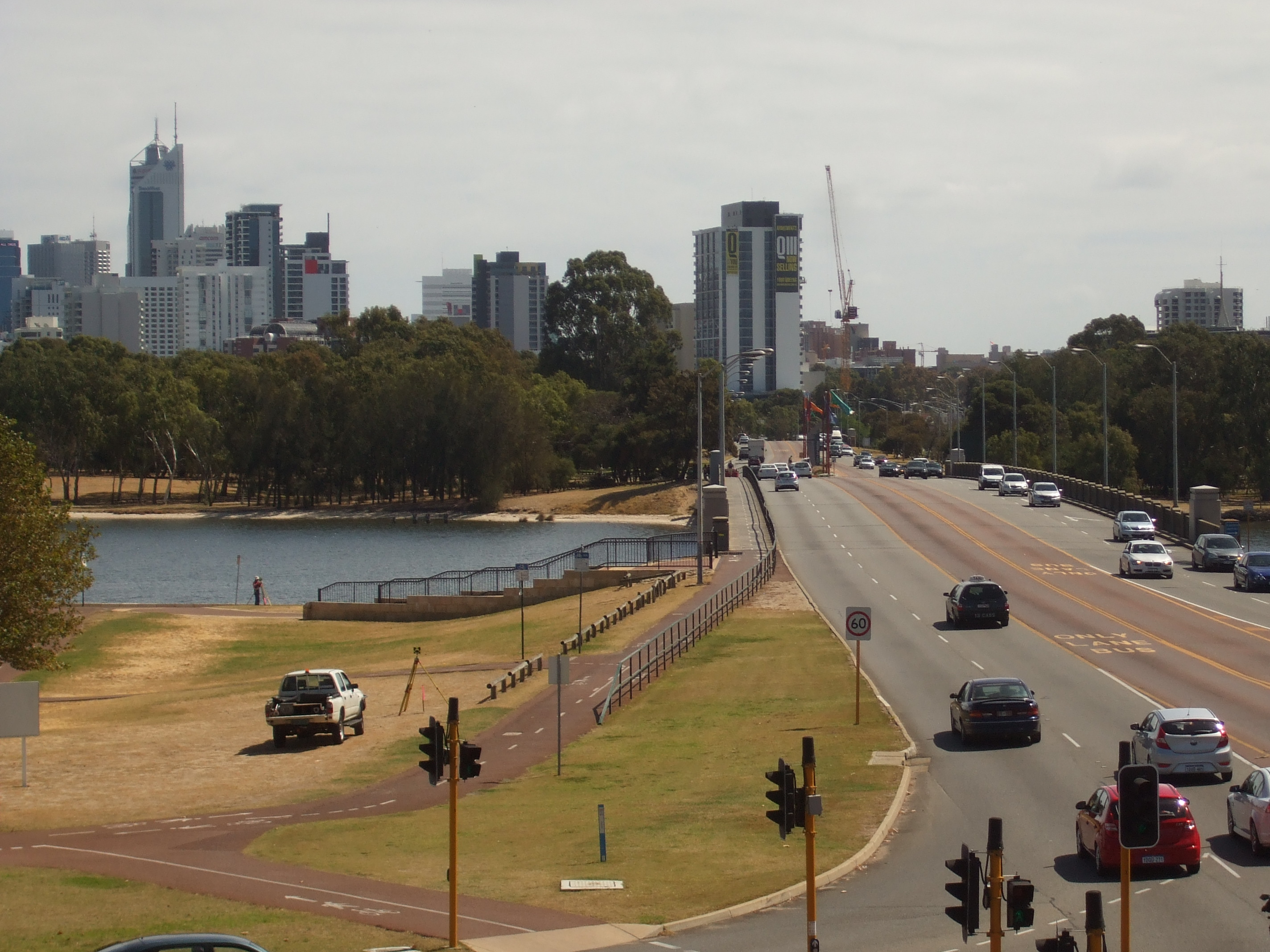
The Causeway heading towards East Perth

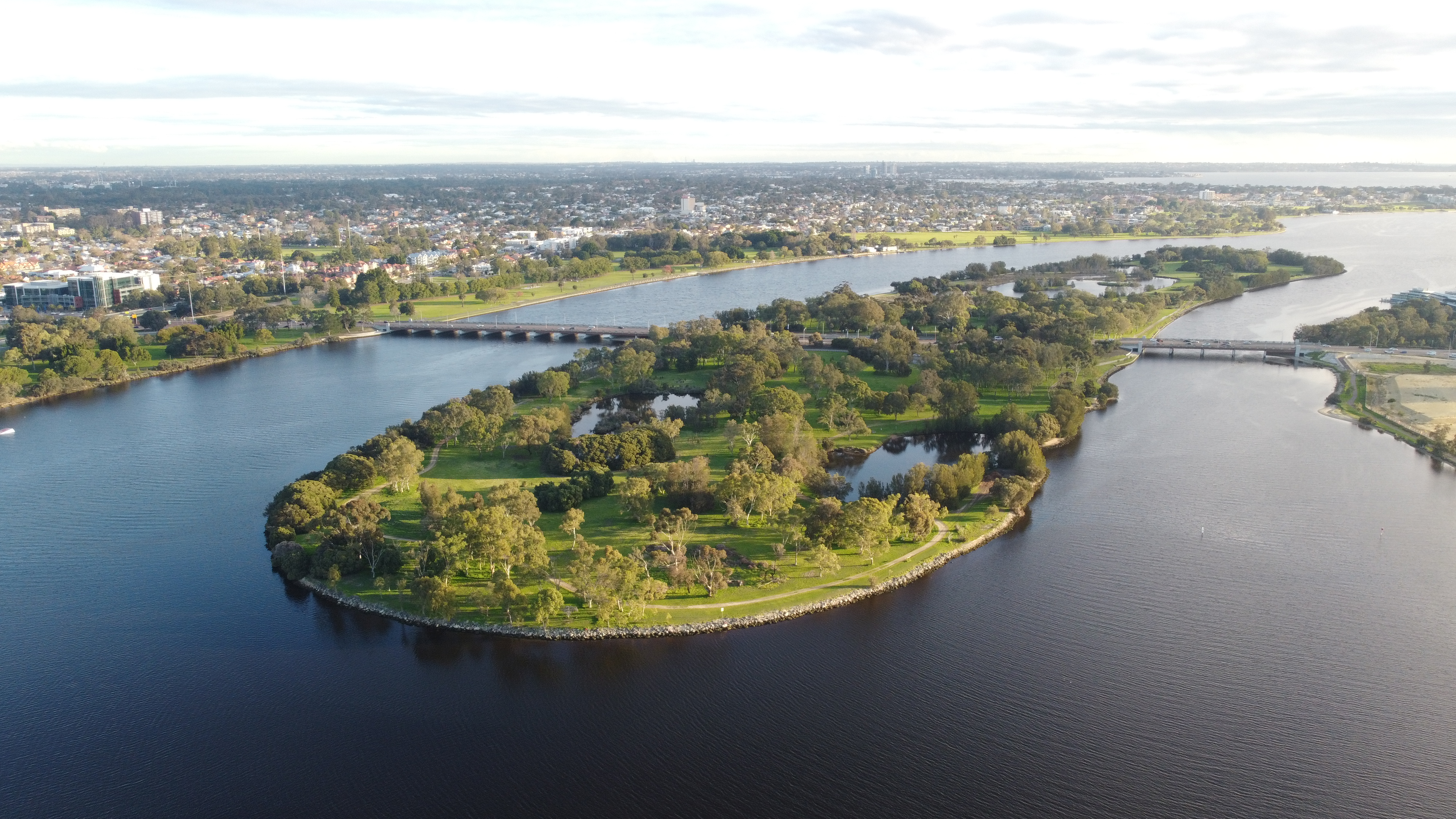
Heirisson Island viewed from a drone with the Causeway crossing it

The Causeway begins in East Perth, at the intersection of Riverside Drive, Adelaide Terrace, and Hay Street. This intersection is a traffic light controlled raindrop roundabout. The road reaches the Swan River's northern foreshore after 350 metres (1,150 ft), and crosses to Heirisson Island via the 114.6-metre-long (376 ft) north-western bridge. The road continues straight across the island for another 300 metres (980 ft). The road passes over the second, 224.72-metre-long (737 ft) bridge, which links Heirisson Island to Victoria Park. The Causeway ends at a grade-separated partial cloverleaf interchange, located 200 metres (660 ft) south-east of the second bridge. The interchange links the Causeway with four other roads: Canning Highway to the south-west, Great Eastern Highway to the north-east, and both Shepperton Road and Albany Highway to the south-east. There is no access to Albany Highway from the Causeway, as Albany Highway is a one-way road leading into the interchange.

== Intersections ==
LGA	Location	km	mi	Destinations	Notes
Perth	East Perth	0	0.0	Riverside Drive (State Route 5) southwest - Perth City Centre, Fremantle, Elizabeth Quay; Hay Street northeast – WACA Ground.	Northwestern terminus at traffic light controlled teardrop roundabout; continues as Adelaide Terrace. Traffic exiting Hay Street can only enter The Causeway southbound, Riverside Drive can only be accessed from The Causeway northbound.
Victoria Park	Burswood–Victoria Park boundary	1.1	0.68	Great Eastern Highway northeast (National Highway 94 / Nation Route 1) – Rivervale, Midland, Perth Airport; Canning Highway southwest (National Route 1 / State Route 6) – Como, Fremantle; Albany Highway southeast – Cannington, Armadale, Albany	Southeastern terminus at partially grade separated favouring Canning and Great Eastern Highways with no access into Albany Highway. Continues as Shepperton Road southeast (State Route 30); Causeway to Canning Highway southbound is looped. Canning Highway northeast bound to Shepperton Road is at-grade. Pedestrian access to Causeway bus station
1.000 mi = 1.609 km; 1.000 km = 0.621 mi: Incomplete access

== Engineering heritage award ==
The current bridges received an Engineering Heritage Marker from Engineers Australia as part of its Engineering Heritage Recognition Program.

== See also ==
- Narrows Bridge (Perth)
- Matagarup Bridge
- Boorloo Bridge
- Perth Water

== Sources ==
- Cygnet (1938). The Story of the Perth Causeway: How the River Swan Was Bridged 100 Years Ago. Swan River booklets. Perth: Swan River Press – via Trove.
- Edmonds, Leigh (1997). The Vital Link: a History of Main Roads Western Australia 1926–1996. Nedlands, Western Australia: University of Western Australia Press. ISBN 1-875560-87-4.
- Gregory, Jenny (2003). City of Light: A History of Perth Since the 1950s. Perth: City of Perth. ISBN 0-9594632-5-9. LCCN 2005440691. OCLC 54781434. OL 3465933M. Wikidata Q133458669.
- Godfrey, E. W. C. (December 1948). "The Causeway Bridges–Swan River, Perth, W.A.". The Journal of the Institution of Engineers, Australia. 20 (12). Sydney: The Institution. ISSN 0020-3319.
