= Boorloo Bridge =

Pedestrian and cycle crossing in Perth, Western Australia

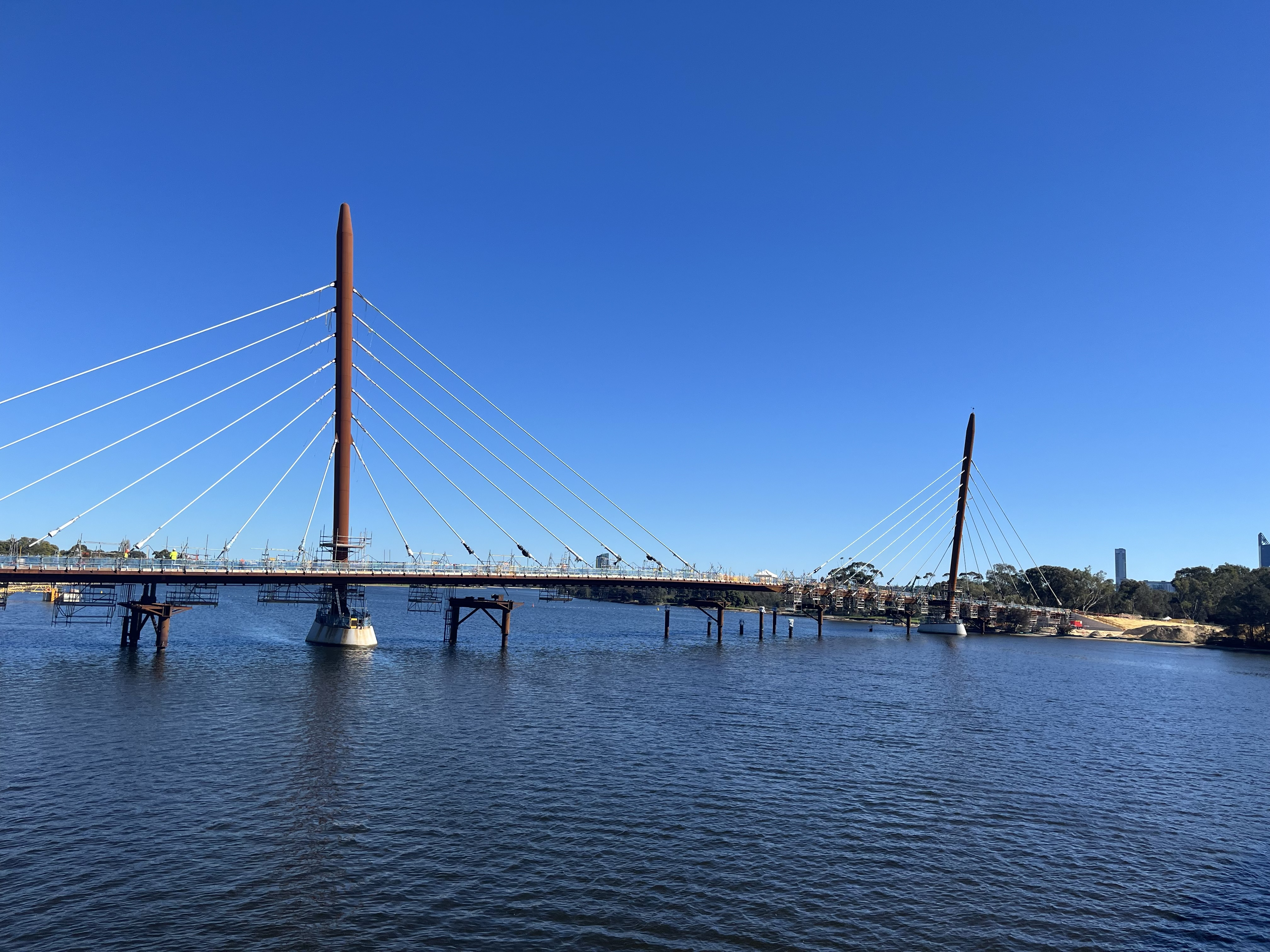
- The south-eastern bridge, the longer of the two Boorloo Bridge bridges that stretches between Heirisson Island and Victoria Park, during construction in July 2024
- Coordinates: 31°57′56″S 115°52′58″E
- Carries: Pedestrians and cyclists
- Crosses: Swan River
- Locale: Perth, Western Australia
- Begins: East Perth
- Ends: Victoria Park
- Named for: Boorloo
- Owner: Main Roads Western Australia
- Next upstream: The Causeway
- Next downstream: Narrows Bridge

Characteristics
- Design: Cable-stayed
- Total length: 443 m (1,453.4 ft)
- Width: 6 m (20 ft)

History
- Architect: Dissing+Weitling
- Constructed by: Civmec; Seymour Whyte; WSP
- Construction start: March 2023
- Construction cost: $100M
- Opening: 22 December 2024

Location
- Boorloo Bridge comprises two bridges: one on the East Perth side of Heirisson Island and a second on the Victoria Park side. The bridges carry a pedestrian and cycle path between the East Perth and Victoria Park sides over the river. Interactive map of Boorloo Bridge

Boorloo Bridge is a pedestrian and cycle crossing comprising two cable-stayed bridges about 250 metres (820 ft) apart that span two separate channels of the Swan River in Perth, Western Australia. These two bridges are connected by the pedestrian and cycle path across Heirisson Island that they carry to the East Perth and Victoria Park foreshores.

The crossing facilitates the linking of the East Perth side of the river with the Victoria Park side, and is located slightly downstream of the Causeway, the existing road crossing between the East Perth and Victoria Park sides across the island also carried over the river by two bridges. Construction began in March 2023, and the two bridges were opened on 22 December 2024. The project was known during construction as the Causeway Pedestrian and Cyclist Bridges and was later named Boorloo Bridge (singular) after the Noongar name for Perth, Boorloo.

== Design ==
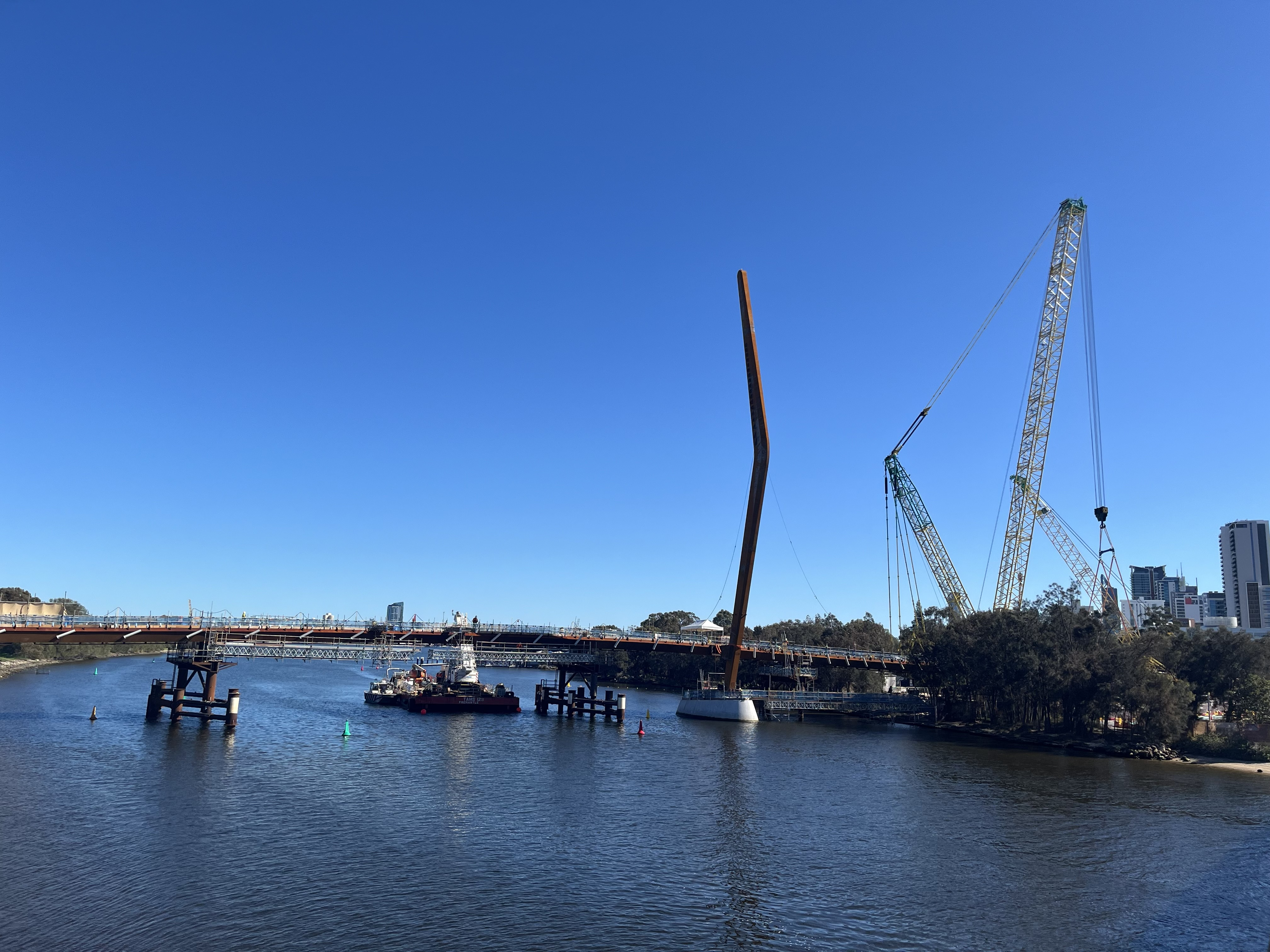
The north-western bridge, the shorter of the two that stretches between Heirisson Island and East Perth, during construction in July 2024

The two bridges, built with 1,628 tonnes (3.6 million pounds) of weathering steel and 3 kilometres (1.9 mi) of cabling, are approximately 90 metres (300 ft) downstream of the Causeway. Separated by an approximately 257-metre-long (843 ft) path across Heirisson Island, the East-Perth-side bridge is about 163 metres (535 ft) long and the Victoria-Park-side bridge is about 280 metres (920 ft) long. The path carried by the two bridges across Swan River and that connects them across Heirisson Island is a 6-metre-wide (20 ft) segregated path. The bridges are S-shaped and represent a Wagyl, the Noongar manifestation of the Rainbow Serpent in Australian Aboriginal religion and mythology. There are three pylons in total. Two pylons are shaped to resemble Aboriginal digging sticks and one pylon is shaped to resemble a boomerang.

=== Lighting display ===
All of the bridge's stay cables – which are between 17 and 94 metres (56 and 308 ft) long – incorporate individually controllable LED modules spaced 300 millimetres (12 in) apart. There are a total of 17,130 modules installed across both spans and together can be used to display messages and images.

== History ==
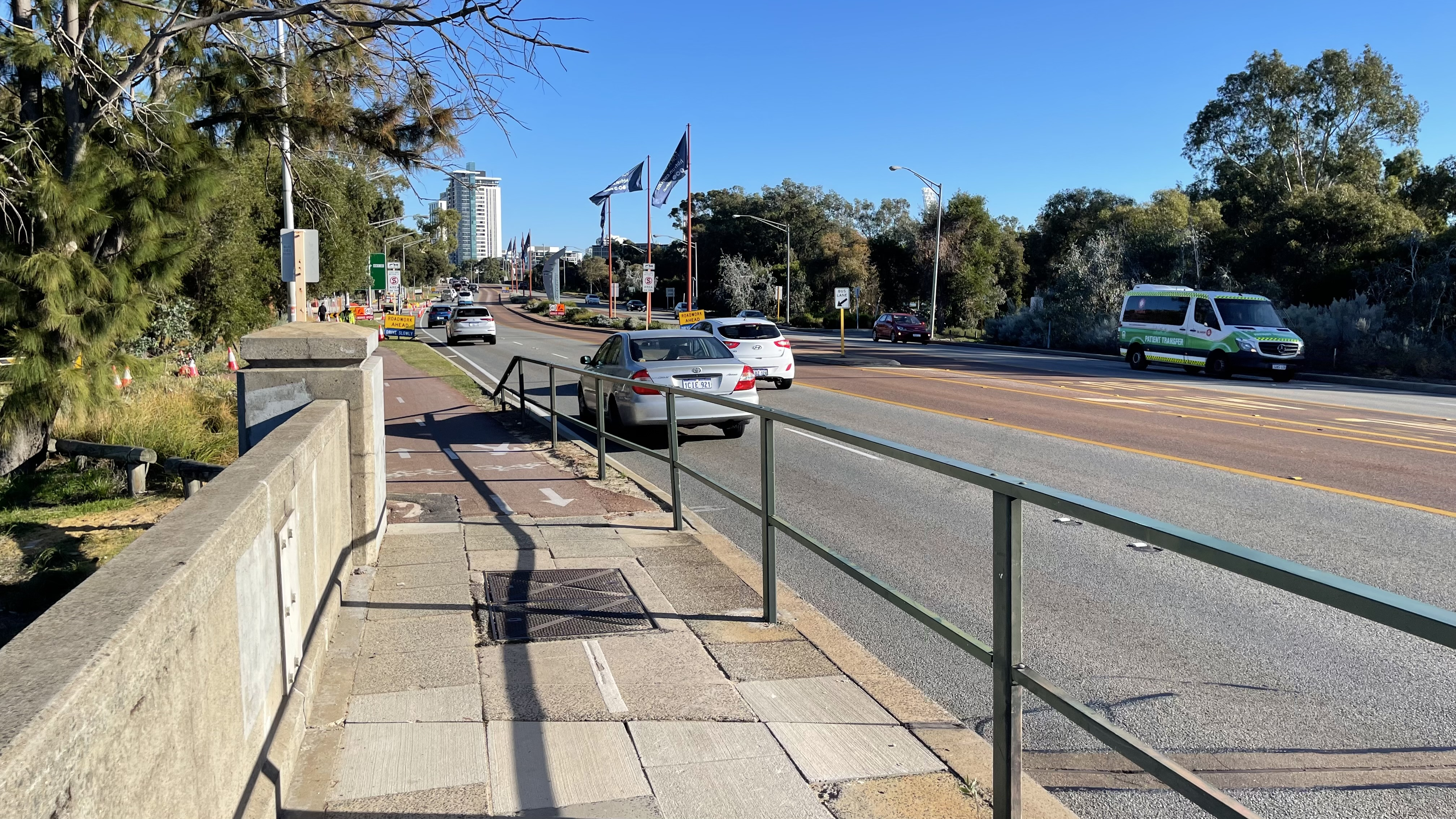
Causeway footpath used by both pedestrians and cyclists to cross the river at Heirisson Island

The Causeway's narrow footpath necessitated a dedicated pedestrian and cycling bridge; in 2021 the Causeway catered "to about 1,400 cyclists and 1,900 pedestrians daily". The bridge was announced on 26 August 2020, with an estimated cost of A$50 million, jointly funded by the state and federal governments under the "Perth City Deal", with the construction managed by Main Roads Western Australia.

Expressions of interest for the construction contract opened in February 2021. Two proponents were shortlisted in April 2021, and a consortium of Civmec, Seymour Whyte and WSP was named preferred proponent in March 2022, with the total estimated cost at the time being $100M. The contract was awarded in April 2022. The Town of Victoria Park approved the bridge in September 2022, with the south-eastern end of the bridge occupying McCallum Park, which is owned by the Town of Victoria Park. The bridge was approved by a Development Assessment Panel in December 2022. The first sod was turned in March 2023. Fabrication of the bridges' components was underway in Henderson, Western Australia, by November 2023. In the same month, riverine construction began. An additional $80M cost was revealed in the May 2024 state budget, for water main upgrades, toilet blocks, and landscaping around the bridge. All major components of the bridges were in place by early August 2024, including all sixteen bridge modules and all pylons. It was also announced that the bridges were on track to open by the end of 2024.

On 14 November 2024 it was announced that the bridges would open on 22 December 2024. The official name for the two bridges was also revealed as Boorloo Bridge (singular), where Boorloo is the Noongar name for Perth.

On 17 November 2025, the bridges and a surrounding section of the Swan River were temporarily closed off to the public after a large lighting cable near the Victoria Park shore became detached and fell into the river and a shared path below, almost hitting a passing cyclist. In late 2026, the bridges were partially closed off to facilitate repairs to permanently address issues with the lighting.
