= Clough Group =

Australian civil engineering company

- Type: Subsidiary
- Industry: Engineering, construction and asset support contractor, primarily to oil and gas industry
- Founded: 1919; 107 years ago
- Founder: John Clough
- Headquarters: West Perth, Western Australia
- Area served: Worldwide
- Key people: Peter Bennett
- Services: Engineering; Construction
- Revenue: ▲$1.51 billion (2012/13)
- Net income: ▲$90.7 million (2012/13)
- Total assets: $461.8 million
- Parent: Webuild (2023–present)
- Website: cloughgroup.com

The Clough Group is an Australian engineering and construction company based in Perth, Western Australia. It has projects in engineering, construction, operations and maintenance services, principally in the oil and gas industry.

Formerly listed on the Australian Securities Exchange, it has been a subsidiary of Webuild since February 2023.

== History ==
Clough was established in Perth in 1919, as builders J. O. Clough and Son. Clough underwent significant growth and diversification from the 1950s through 1970s. In 1964, BAM Clough was established as a 50:50 joint venture with Royal BAM Group to deliver major jetty and near shore marine projects in Australia and Papua New Guinea. Expansion was fuelled by civil engineering and infrastructure contracts from Western Australia's Pilbara iron ore boom. Clough undertook its first oil-and-gas project on Barrow Island in 1965.

During the 1970s and 1980s, Clough pursued activities in the Middle East, Indonesia and Africa. Branch offices were established in Brisbane, Bangkok and Houston. Acquisition of the Petrosea Group of Companies in 1984 (divested in 2009) was a basis for expansion in the South East Asian region. The company was listed on the Australian Securities Exchange (ASX) in 1998, with the Clough family ceasing to be shareholders in 2007.

Around 1991, Clough Engineering took over Noyes Brothers, and traded as Noyes-Clough until 2002, when that branch of the company was purchased by Project Solutions Australia. In the 1990s, Clough AMEC was established as a 50:50 joint venture with Amec to deliver brownfield asset support to the Australasian oil and gas sector.

In October 2008, Clough sponsored construction of a First Year Centre for engineering students at the University of Western Australia, which opened in 2010, supporting students "with a space to have as their base, to meet, work in groups, and also work on projects [from industry]". It was recorded that former chairman and managing director Harold Clough had been a long-term benefactor of the university.

Having been a shareholder since 2004, in November 2013 Murray & Roberts took full ownership with the company delisted from the ASX. In February 2019, Clough acquired Saulsbury's Gulf Coast downstream and chemical business unit in Houston, Texas.

In 2022 Clough suffered financial distress and was at risk of financial collapse. After a proposed takeover by Webuild collapsed, Murray & Roberts placed it in administration.

In February 2023 Clough was eventually acquired by WeBuild.

== Notable projects ==
- Narrows Bridge (Perth) (1957)
- Barrow Island Oilfield Development (1965)
- Stirling Bridge (1974)
- Mount Henry Bridge (1982)
- Graham Farmer Freeway (2000) in a joint venture with Baulderstone
- Northern Busway, Brisbane (2004) in a joint venture with Seymour Whyte
- Snowy 2.0, Snowy Mountains civil and electro-mechanical works in a joint venture with Webuild
