= Valda Unthank =

Australian cyclist

Valda Emily Unthank
Personal information
- Nickname: Paralysing Pedaller
- Born: Emily Garnham; 1909 Lilliput, Bogong, Victoria, Australia
- Died: 21 June 1987 (aged 78) Wonthaggi, Victoria, Australia

Cycling career
- Sport: Cycling
- Disciplines: Road & track
- Role: Rider
- Rider type: Endurance

Professional team
- Malvern Star

Major wins
- 1938 record Adelaide to Melbourne, 475 miles (764 km) in 33 hours 43 minutes; 1939 7 day record of 1,438.5 miles (2,315.0 km)

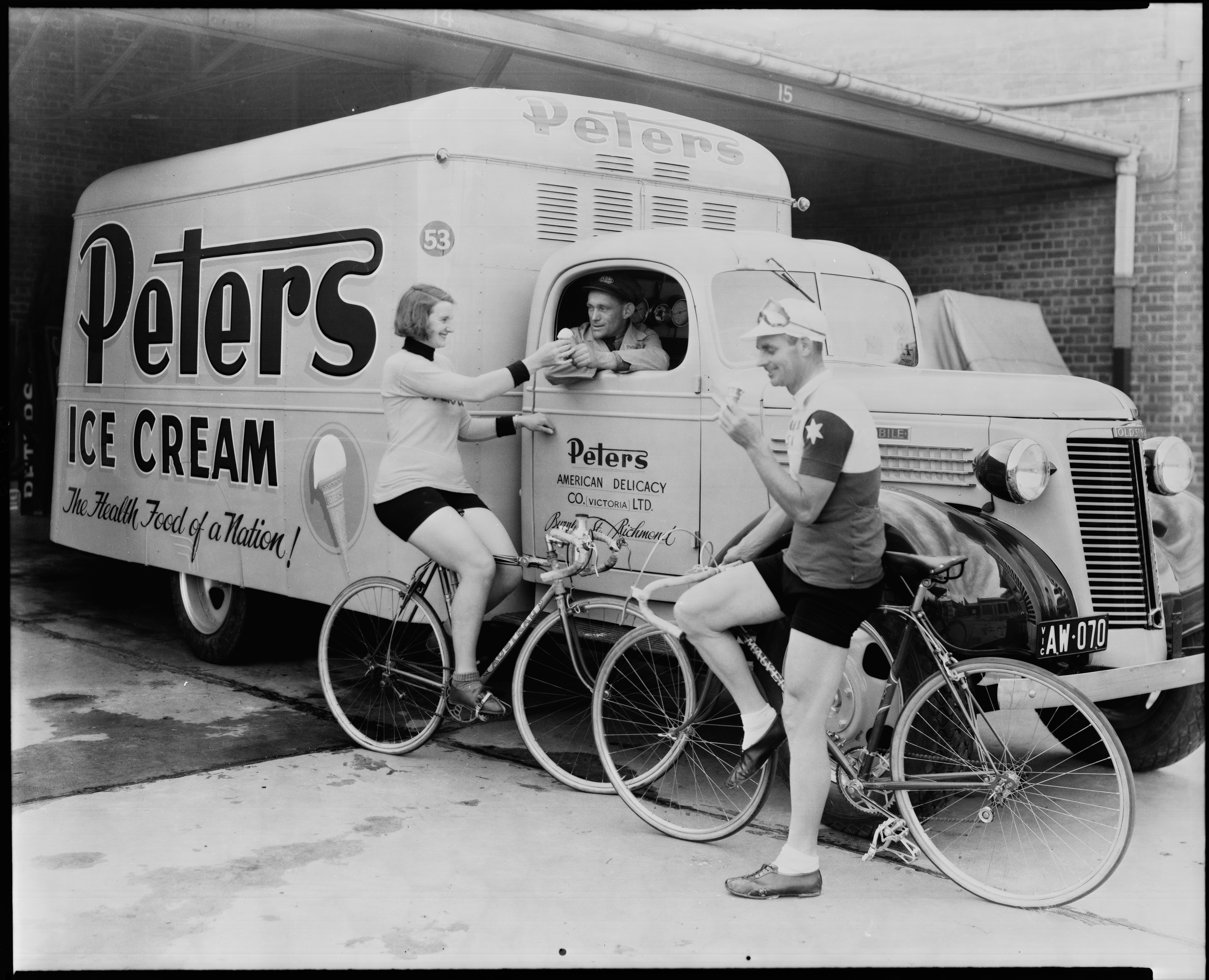
Valda Unthank having ice cream with Hubert Opperman. Advertisement for Peters Ice Cream

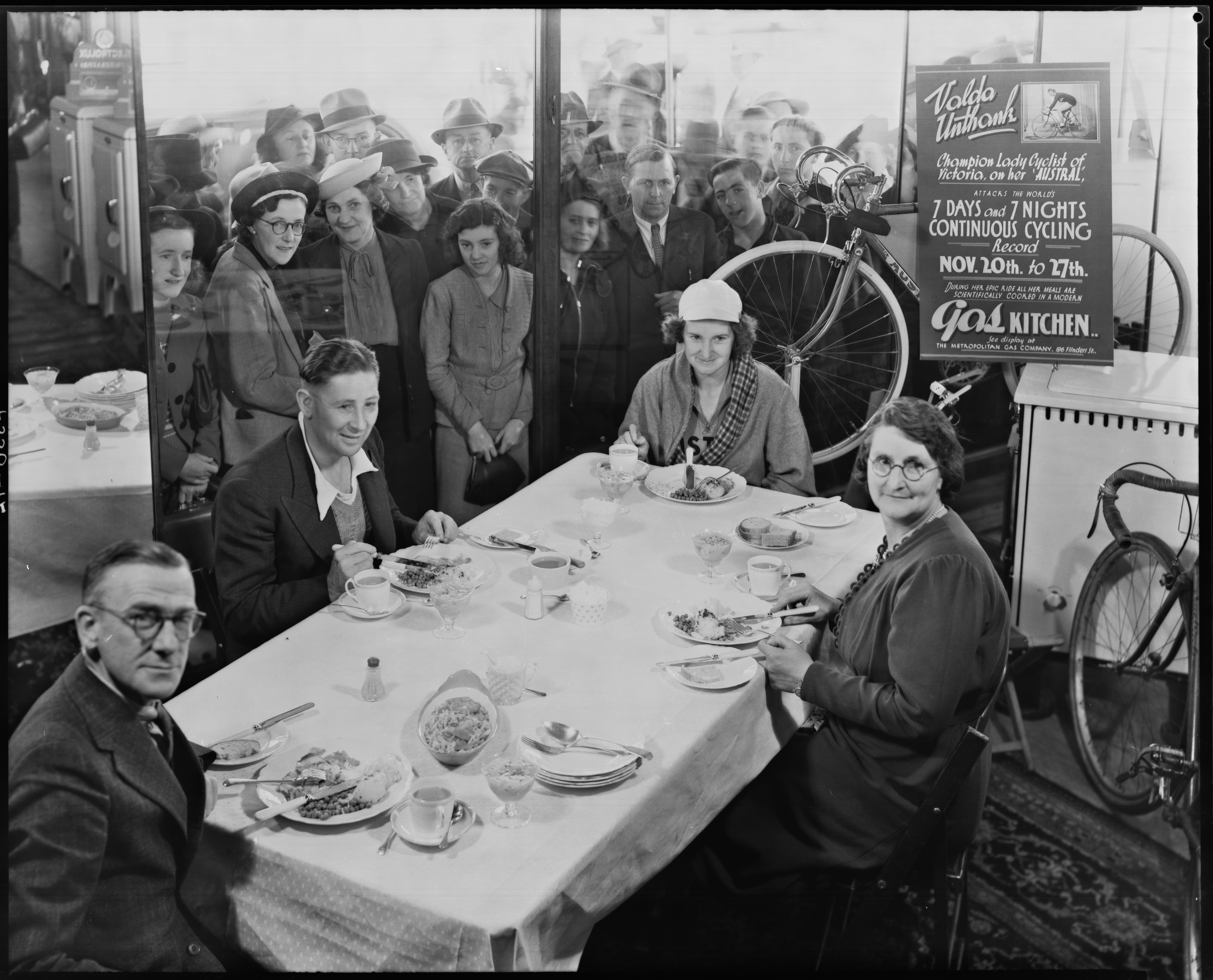
Valda Unthank dining with Ossie Nicholson. Advertising promotion for Metropolitan Gas Company

Valda Emily Unthank (née Garnham, 1909 – 21 June 1987) was an Australian cyclist who held numerous records for long-distance cycling, mostly set during 1938–39, most notably the women's seven day record.

Valda was born in 1909 as "Emily Garnham" at Lilliput, Victoria to William and Edith Garnham (née Blackburne). In 1933 she married John Leslie Roberts "Jack" Unthank, a Councillor at the Victorian League of Wheelmen. Little is known of her early years until her first reported cycling record in 1935, covering the 89 miles (143 km) from Prahran to Wonthaggi in 5 hours 5 mins.

What first established Unthank's reputation though was the ride in October 1938 from Adelaide to Melbourne covering 475 miles (764 km) in 33 hours 43 minutes. Unthank was sponsored by Austral bikes, a brand within the Malvern Star group, and the rides were organised by Jack O'Donohue, publicity manager for Bruce Small Ltd.

This was followed shortly after by riding from Launceston to Burnie and return on 14 November 1938, setting the 12 hour Australian women's record of 198.4 miles (319.3 km) and rode on to set the 200 miles (320 km) Australian women's record in 12h 8 min.

In March 1939 Unthank set a New South Wales hour record of 20.317 miles (32.697 km). In June Unthank traveled to Queensland where she set a new 12 hour record of 205 miles (330 km) before returning to Victoria to set the 25 miles (40 km) record in 51 min 40 sec.

1939 culminated in riding 1,438.5 miles (2,315.0 km) over seven days for what was claimed as a women's world record, bettering the 1,107 miles (1,782 km) set by Joyce Barry in September 1938. Unthank was supported by another Malvern Star rider, Ossie Nicholson, who had set the world endurance record for distance in a calendar year in 1933, and 1937, as well as the Australian men's seven day record of 1,507.5 miles (2,426.1 km) in 1938. The seven day record was also sponsored by the Metropolitan Gas Company who supplied a "modern gas kitchen" to cook all Unthank's meals. Unthank also appeared in an advertisement for Peters Ice Cream ("The health food of a nation") along with Hubert Opperman. Unthank's seven day record was eclipsed in March 1940 by the next Malvern Star woman rider, Pat Hawkins who rode 1,546.8 miles (2,489.3 km).

World War II saw Unthank retire, although she returned for events competing on bicycle rollers to raise money for the Red Cross.

Unthank died in June 1987 at the age of 78.
