= Webuild =

Italian construction and civil engineering group

Webuild S.p.A.
- Type: Public
- Traded as: BIT: WBD; BIT: WBDR; FTSE Italia Mid Cap
- Industry: Construction; Civil engineering
- Founded: 2014; 12 years ago (as Salini Impregilo)
- Headquarters: Rome; Rozzano
- Key people: Gian Luca Gregori (chairman); Pietro Salini (CEO)
- Products: Large complex infrastructure for sustainable mobility, hydro energy, water and green buildings
- Revenue: ▲€11,790.5 million (2024)
- Operating income: ▲€522.6 million (2024)
- Net income: ▲€199.5 million (2024)
- Number of employees: ▲92,000 (2024)
- Subsidiaries: The Lane Construction Corporation (USA); Clough Group (Australia); Cossi Costruzioni SpA (Italy); Fisia Italimpianti SpA (Italy); NBI SpA (Italy); Seli Overseas SpA (Italy); CSC Costruzioni (Switzerland)
- Website: www.webuildgroup.com

Webuild S.p.A. (previously Salini Impregilo S.p.A.; Italian: [saˈliːni impreˈdʒiːlo]) is an Italian industrial group specialising in construction and civil engineering. The company was formally founded in 2014 as the result of the merger by incorporation of Salini into Impregilo. Webuild is the largest Italian engineering and general contractor group and a global player in the construction sector.

The company is active in over 50 countries of 5 continents (Africa, America, Asia, Europe, Oceania) with more than 85,000 employees. Its experience ranges from the construction of dams, hydroelectric plants and hydraulic structures, water infrastructures and ports, to roads, motorways, railways, metro systems and underground works, to airports, hospitals and public and industrial buildings, to civil engineering for waste-to-energy plants and environmental protection initiatives. It takes first place in the water sector of the Engineering News-Record rankings, the benchmark for the entire construction industry.

The company is listed on the Borsa Italiana. Its chief executive is Pietro Salini.

== History ==
The company was founded as Impregilo in 1960 and expanded following a merger with Cogefar-Impresit S.p.A., Girola S.p.A. and Lodigiani S.p.A. in 1994.

Impregilo established a business relationship with Fisia in 1998, and acquired Todini in 2010.

In 2011 Salini, privately held, began its acquisition of Impregilo with an initial purchase of shares, reaching 25% the following year. The acquisition set a precedent in Italy because it was the first proxy fight for control of a company to occur in the country. Despite the opposition it faced from a group of investors, Salini managed to convince enough shareholders at an assembly in July 2012 to approve its proposal to replace Impregilo's board of directors with its own list of candidates. Once in place, these new members of the board approved Salini's offer to buy the rest of Impregilo. Pietro Salini became chief executive. A few months later, the board approved Salini's plan.

In 2013, Salini launched a tender offer to buy the remaining ordinary shares in Impregilo. In January 2014 the transaction was completed forming Salini Impregilo.

In 2016, it bought Lane Industries, based in Connecticut and, in 2019, it announced the acquisition of a majority stake in Cossi Costruzioni.

In May 2020, the company was rebranded as Webuild. In November 2020, Webuild acquired a 65% shareholding in Astaldi.

In November 2022, Webuild announced that, subject to due diligence, it would acquire the Australian based company Clough Group.

== Operations ==
The group is organised into four business areas: Clean Hydro Energy, Clean Water, Sustainable Mobility, Green Buildings. The company's projects include 313 dams and hydroelectric plants; 13,319 kilometres (8,276 miles) of railway lines; 3,408 kilometres (2,118 miles) of underground works, 821 kilometres (510 miles) of which subway lines; 82,533 kilometres (51,284 miles) of roads and highways; and 1,020 kilometres (630 miles) of bridges and viaducts.

== Major projects ==
Projects in which the company has been involved include buildings, public utilities, motorways, underground works, airports, water supply systems, waste disposals, hospitals and land development. Some major examples include:

- Kariba Dam, Zimbabwe/Zambia, 1959
- Dez Dam, Iran, 1963
- Akosombo Dam, Ghana, 1966
- Salvage of the Abu Simbel temples, Egypt, 1968
- Bay of Fontvieille, Monaco, 1973
- Fréjus Road Tunnel, France/Italy, 1980
- Tarbela Dam, Pakistan, 1983
- Trans-Gabon Railway, Gabon, 1986
- San Roque González de Santa Cruz Bridge, Argentina/Paraguay, 1990
- New Hemicycle of European Parliament, France, 1997
- Lesotho Highlands Water Project, 1998
- Extensions to the Rodovia dos Imigrantes, Brazil, 2002
- Ghazi Barotha Dam, Pakistan, 2002
- Nathpa Jhakri Hydroelectric Power Project, India, 2003
- Sheikh Zayed Grand Mosque, United Arab Emirates, 2003
- Desalination plant Jebel Ali L, United Arab Emirates, 2008
- Kárahnjúkar Hydropower Plant, Iceland, 2008
- Turin–Milan and Bologna–Florence high-speed railways, Italy, 2009
- Expansion of the Churchill Hospital in Oxford, 2009
- Grand Ethiopian Renaissance Dam, 2011
- Gilgel Gibe III Dam, Ethiopia, 2015
- Expansion of the Panama Canal – third set of locks, 2016
- Faido sections of the Gotthard Base Tunnel, 2016
- Cityringen, new subway circular urban line in Copenhagen, 2019
- Red Line North, part of the Doha Metro project in Qatar, 2019.
- Genoa-Saint George Bridge, 2020
- Forrestfield–Airport Link, extension to the Transperth rail network, 2022
- Rogun Dam, Tajikistan, due to complete in 2025
- Portions of the Grand Paris Express, France, due to complete in 2025
- Dam and artificial lake at Trojena, in Neom, Saudi Arabia, due to complete in 2026
- Snowy 2.0 Pumped Storage Power Station, due to complete in 2028
- Texas Central Railway, undergoing planning and property acquisition, due to complete in the early 2030s

== See also ==
- Strait of Messina Bridge
