= Pat Hawkins (cyclist) =

Australian cyclist

Eleanor Patricia Hawkins (22 May 1921 – 13 February 1991), better known as Pat Hawkins, was an Australian endurance cyclist from Victoria Park, Perth. In 1940, aged 18 and only 12 months into her cycling career, she set world records for "1,000 miles" and "Seven days". She also set the Australian records for distance travelled in one, two, three, four, five, six and seven days, plus surpassing the Australian professional men's record.

In February 1942, aged 20 years old, she claimed the world record for "Distance covered in a year" with a ride of 45,402.8 miles (73,068.7 km), but one week later her claim was disallowed due to "irregularities in the log sheets".

== One thousand miles ==
On 13 March 1940 Hawkins set the "World 1,000-mile record" in Perth, having ridden the 1,000 miles (1,600 km) distance in 4 days, 8 hours and 7 minutes, cutting 9 hours 53 minutes off the record set by Valda Unthank of Hastings, Victoria.

== Seven days ==
On Sunday 17 March 1940 Hawkins, only 12 months into her cycling career, set the "World Seven Days record" in Perth, having ridden 1,546.8 miles (2,489.3 km) to surpass the previous best (1,438.4 miles (2,314.9 km)) set by Unthank. Hawkins also broke the West Australian records for one, two, three, four, five, six and seven days, plus surpassing the Australian professional men's record of Ossie Nicholson. Hawkins completed the ride in front of a huge crowd outside the Malvern Star headquarters in Hay Street and was greeted by H. Millington, Minister for Works. Unthank sent her public messages of congratulations.

Hawkins was comprehensively sponsored and equipped for the attempt, and said in her valedictory speech in the Sunday Times

"... I would like to extend my sincere thanks to my many thousands of well wishers who encouraged me in my efforts to clinch the record. My special thanks are due to Mr Herb. Elliott for his herculean organising efforts, to my trainer Jack Foy, to 'Canada Motors' for supplying a Pontiac car to follow me, to Sister McPherson for her wonderful massage, to Philips radio for their faultless equipment, [her support car had been equipped with one of the world's first car radios] to Peters Ice Cream, to Leggatts Tyres, to Cadburys Chocolate, to the B.S.A. company, and of course to Bruce Small Pty. Ltd. for my Malvern Star cycle and their unsparing efforts to ensure success."

== Distance covered in a year ==
In February 1942 Hawkins completed a 45,402.8 miles (73,068.7 km) ride in Perth, despite having missed seven weeks' riding because of injury, illness, and her mother's death. The press had reported throughout her 12-month campaign, comparing her milestones to those of the world record set by L.I. Billie Dovey, the English Keep Fit Girl. To wit, "after ten weeks [Hawkins] had recorded 7,302.8 miles (11,752.7 km) compared to Mrs Dovey's 5,238 miles (8,430 km)." Hawkins surpassed Dovey's record 29,899 miles (48,118 km) after 36 weeks, three days, one hour and 20 minutes and then raised the record by another 15,503 miles (24,950 km) over the final 16 weeks. The endeavour was sponsored by Bruce Small Pty Ltd.

=== Dénouement ===
One week after Hawkins completed her ride, the officials refused to recognise the record due to "irregularities in the log sheets".

Marion Stell wrote in her book Half the Race, A history of Australian women in sport of the anonymous reality that followed the excitement of the record.

One woman oblivious to part of the war was cyclist Pat Hawkins of Perth. From February 1941 to February 1942 Hawkins made an attempt on the year's cycling world record of 29 603 miles held by Mrs Bill Dovey of England. Hawkins was only off the road for seven weeks of the twelve-month period and claimed a distance of 45,402 miles. But one week later supervising officials found what they called "certain irregularities in Miss Hawkin's log sheets" and refused to recognise the record. One wonders if she ever rode a bicycle again.

Australia did not appear to dwell on the loss of the record, nor even mention it; only a couple of newspapers appear to have referred to it: a single paragraph in the Army News of Darwin while The Cairns Post stated that "A signed statement admitting the irregularities has been handed to the committee and sponsors of the effort by Miss Hawkins."

== Personal life ==
Hawkins was born in North Fremantle, Western Australia in May 1921. She married William James Kelly in 1941 and died in Perth in February 1991 at the age of 69.
