= Stirling Bridge =

Bridge in Fremantle, Western Australia

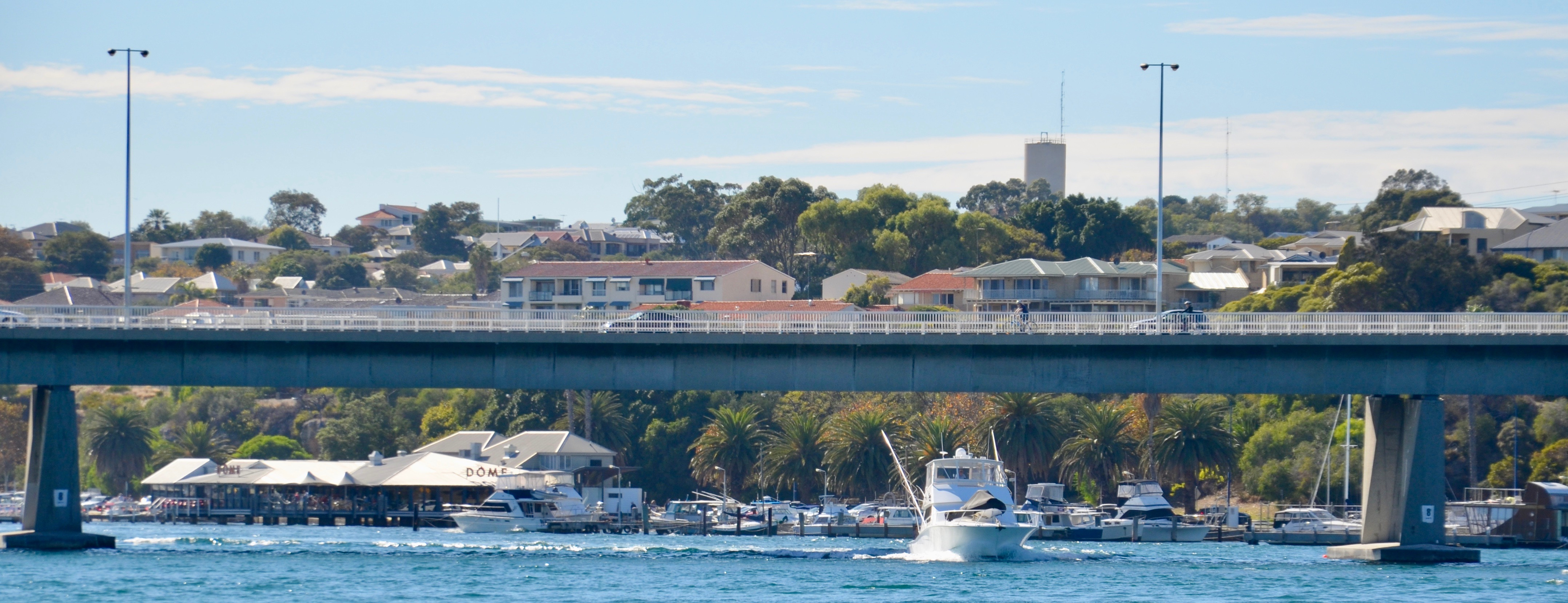
- Coordinates: 32°02′21″S 115°45′34″E
- Carries: Stirling Highway
- Crosses: Swan River
- Locale: Fremantle
- Owner: Main Roads Western Australia
- Preceded by: Narrows Bridge
- Followed by: Walyalup Bridge

Characteristics
- Total length: 415 m (1,362 ft)
- Width: 16 m (52 ft)
- Clearance above: 9 m (30 ft)
- No. of lanes: 4

History
- Constructed by: J. O. Clough and Son
- Opened: 17 May 1974

Location
- Interactive map of Stirling Bridge

Stirling Bridge carries Stirling Highway over the Swan River, linking the suburbs of North Fremantle and East Fremantle in Perth, Western Australia.

== History ==
Stirling Bridge is a seven span twin post-tensioned segmental spine concrete bridge, with an overall length of 415 metres (1,362 ft). Built by J. O. Clough and Son, it was officially opened by Premier Charles Court on 17 May 1974.
