= Pietro Salini =

Italian businessman (born 1958)

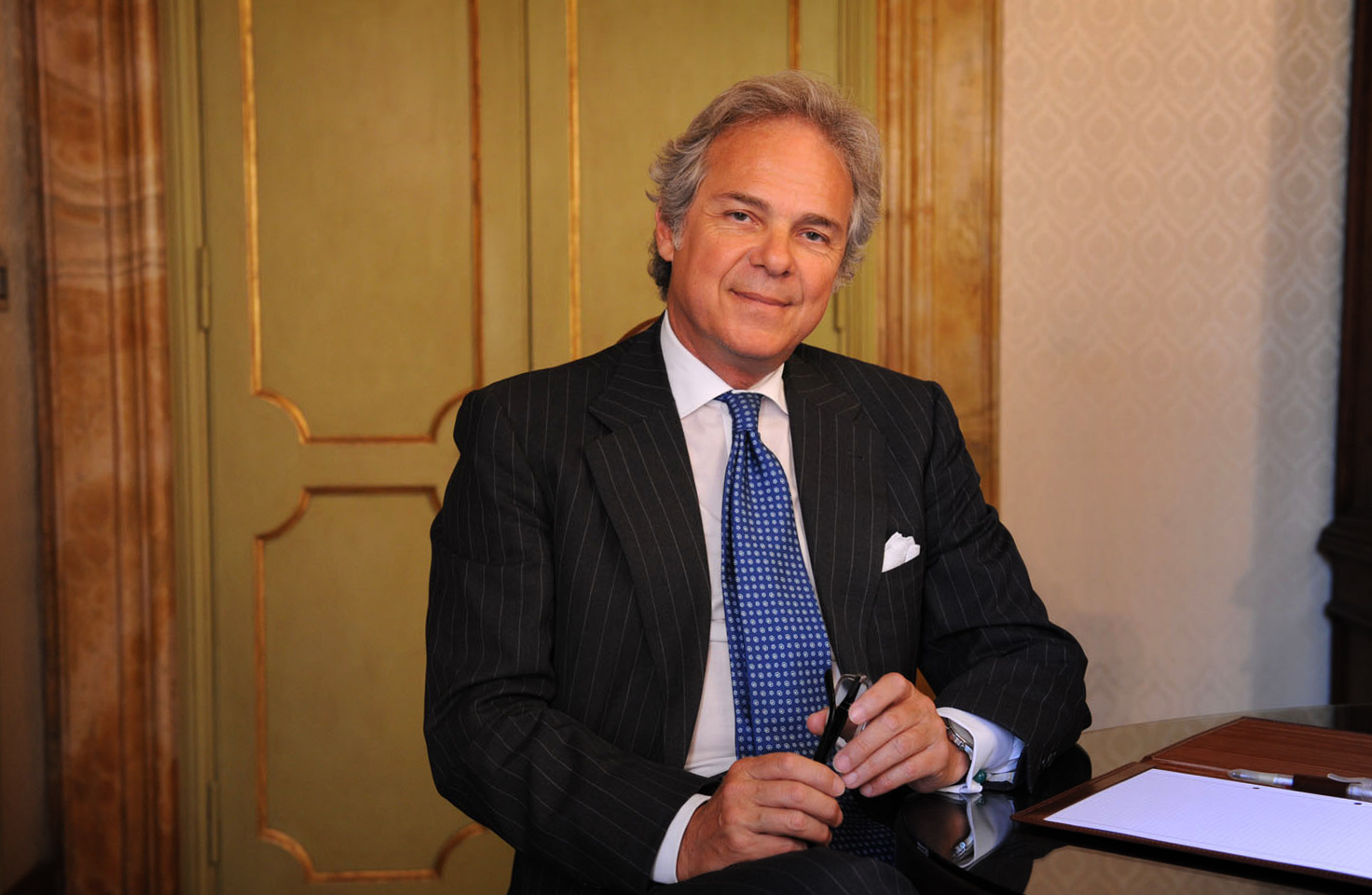
- Salini in 2011 at 53
- Born: 29 March 1958 (age 68); Rome, Italy
- Education: Sapienza University of Rome
- Occupation: CEO of Webuild
- Website: www.webuildgroup.com

Pietro Salini (born 29 March 1958) is an Italian businessman and chief executive officer of Webuild (previously known as Salini Impregilo).

On 31 May 2013, he was honoured with the title of Cavaliere del Lavoro (Knight of Labour, for his service to industry), and on 11 December 2013 he won the Tiepolo Award in Madrid for the deal that resulted in the takeover of Impregilo.

== Biography ==
After graduating from La Sapienza University in Rome, in 1987, in Economics and Business, Salini joined the Salini Group – a construction company founded in the 1930s – taking on important roles in management and international development. In 1987 Salini embarked on his professional career at Salini Costruttori SpA, implementing strategies to foster international growth.

In 1994, Salini was appointed chief executive officer of Salini Costruttori. 2009 saw the acquisition by Salini of Todini Costruzioni Generali SpA (from 60% to 77,71% of ownership interest) making Salini Costruttori the third largest construction group in Italy behind fellow competitors Astaldi and Impregilo.

In 2010, Salini was appointed as chief executive officer of Todini Costruzioni Generali SpA. 2011 saw further external growth by Salini through the acquisition of an equity stake (15%) in Impregilo SpA. In July 2012, after both a proxy fight and a board meeting aimed at changing current management, Salini was appointed chief executive officer of Impregilo.

In April 2013, after a voluntary public tender offer for Impregilo, Salini Group took over 92% of Impregilo, paving the way for the formal merger of Salini into Impregilo. In 2014 Salini was appointed as chief executive officer of the new Salini Impregilo group. Today the Salini Impregilo Group boasts a construction portfolio above €29bn with operations in over 50 countries across 5 continents, employing approximately 31,000 people.

== Messina Bridge ==
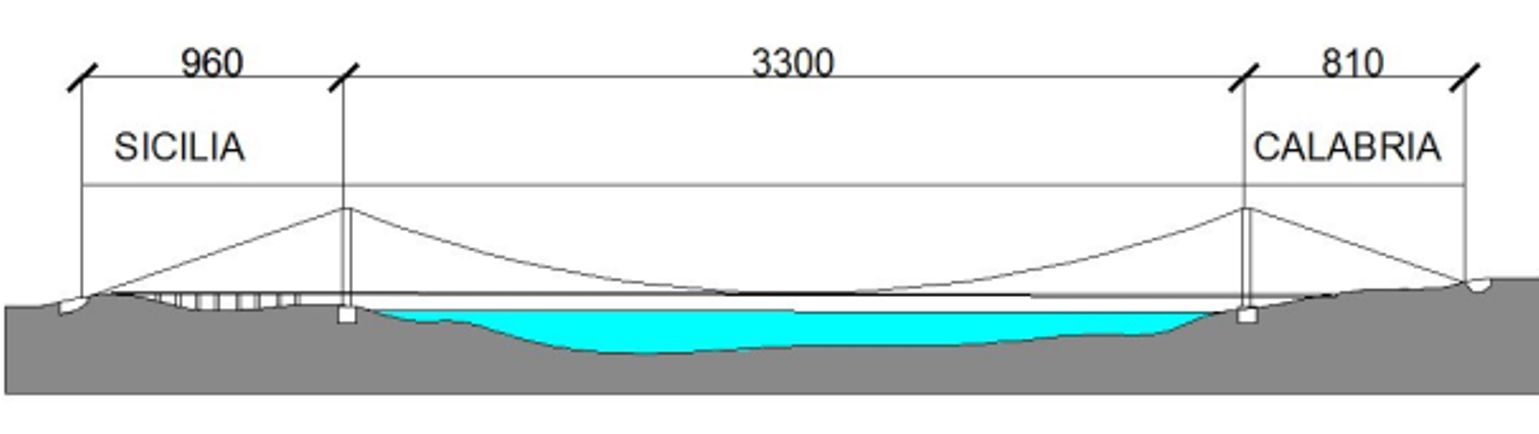
Cross-sectional diagram of the Strait of Messina Bridge.

On 22 April 2021 the CEO of Webuild, Pietro Salini, in Catania in a joint press conference with the President of the Sicilian Region Nello Musumeci, announced that he was ready to build the Strait of Messina Bridge, starting immediately with the works and on the basis of the executive project and construction site approved definitively in 2013.

He declared that he already had the 4 billion euro coverage necessary for the construction of the Work and that he could obtain the other two necessary for the infrastructures connected to it from private financing.

== Other positions ==
Salini also currently serves as sole director of Pietro Salini & C. S.r.l. and, as such, deputy chairman and member of the board of General Partners of Salini Simonpietro e C. S.a.p.A. He is also a member of the board of Confindustria and a board member of Assonime.

== Honours ==
Cavaliere del Lavoro – 31 May 2013

Winner of Tiepolo Award – 11 December 2013

== See also ==
- Webuild
- Strait of Messina Bridge
