= Jenny Gregory =

Australian historian

Jennifer Anne Gregory AM (born 1946) is an Australian academic and historian. Her research and writing focuses on the history of Western Australia. As of September 2020 she is professor emerita at the University of Western Australia.

Gregory was born Jennifer Anne Gleeson in Melbourne, Victoria in 1946. Her father had been a World War II fighter pilot in the Royal Australian Air Force. He met her mother, a nursing sister, when recuperating from a crash landing. The family moved to Sydney in 1952, where she attended Ascham School. On finishing school she began studies at the National Art School but, following the family's move to Perth in 1965, she enrolled in Perth Technical College. In 1966 she joined the public service and was encouraged to enrol in a tertiary degree. Marriage to Ross Gregory in 1969 and the birth of two children delayed the completion of her bachelor's degree. She graduated from the University of Western Australia (UWA) in 1982 with Bachelor of Arts (Nedlands: A study in residential segregation and community) and with a Ph.D (The manufacture of middle class suburbia: The promontory of Claremont, Nedlands and Dalkeith within the city of Perth, Western Australia, 1830s–1930s) in 1989. From 2009 to 2015 she was head of school (humanities) at UWA.

== Awards and recognition ==
In 2001 Gregory was awarded a Centenary Medal for "service to the community as President of the National Trust of Western Australia", while in the 2010 Australia Day Honours she was appointed Member of the Order of Australia for "service to the community as a historian and academic and through the promotion and preservation of local and regional history in Western Australia".

== Works ==
- Western Australia between the wars, 1919–1939, University of Western Australia Press, 1990, ISBN 0864220979
- Building a Tradition: A history of Scotch College, Perth 1897–1996, University of Western Australia Press, 1996 ISBN 1875560890
- Claremont: A history, co-written by Geoffrey Bolton, University of Western Australia Press, 1999 ISBN 1876268387
- Jenny Gregory (2003). City of Light: A History of Perth Since the 1950s. Perth: City of Perth. ISBN 0-9594632-5-9. LCCN 2005440691. OCLC 54781434. OL 3465933M. Wikidata Q133458669.
- Jenny Gregory; Janice Gothard, eds. (2009). Historical Encyclopedia of Western Australia (PDF). Crawley: UWA Publishing. ISBN 978-1-921401-15-2. OCLC 405500003. OL 45266821M. Wikidata Q5773872.
