= Heirisson Island =

Island in Perth, Western Australia

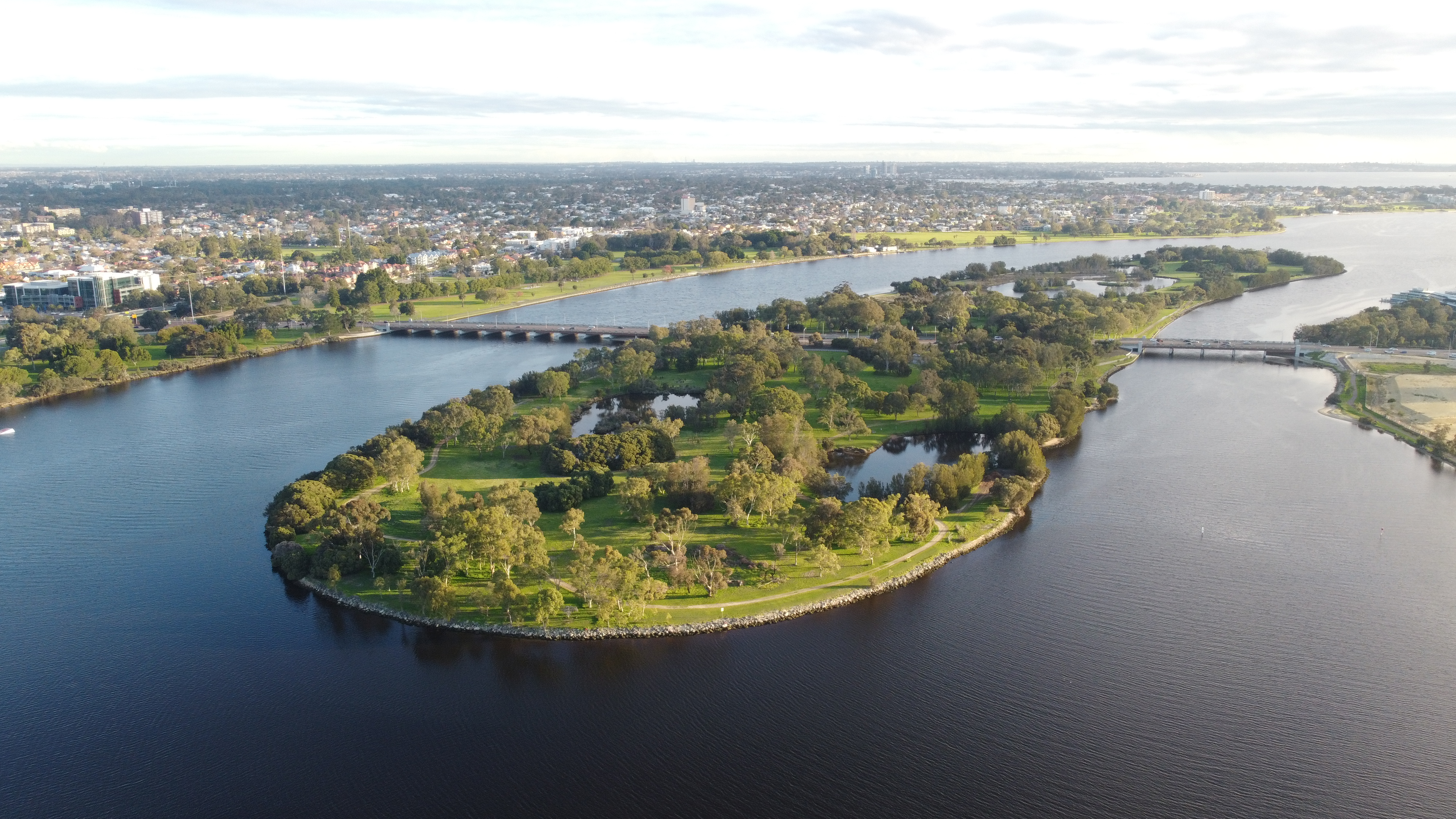
- Heirisson Island from the air with South Perth in the background

Geography
- Location: East Perth, Western Australia
- Coordinates: 31°57′57″S 115°52′55″E
- Adjacent to: Swan River
- Area: 285,600 m^{2} (3,074,000 sq ft)

Administration
- Australia
- State: Western Australia
- City: City of Perth
- Suburb: East Perth

Additional information
- Time zone: AWST (UTC+8)

Heirisson Island is an artificially created island in the Swan River in Western Australia at the eastern end of Perth Water, within the suburb of East Perth. It occupies an area of 285,600 square metres (70.6 acres), and is connected to the two foreshores by the Causeway and Boorloo Bridge. The next upstream island is Kuljak Island, then Ron Courtney Island, with no islands in the Swan River downstream between Heirisson Island and the Indian Ocean other than the artificial islet in Elizabeth Quay.

Before development, there were several small islands, surrounded by mudflats. Over the years, dredging and reclamation has created a single island, which is now a landscaped nature reserve, with a 2-kilometre (1.2 mi) walking path. The Noongar name for the area is Matagarup (meaning 'leg deep'), which has been retained for the single island after reclamation.

Heirisson Island is listed on the Western Australia Department of Aboriginal Affairs' Register of Aboriginal Sites, as ID 3589.

== History ==
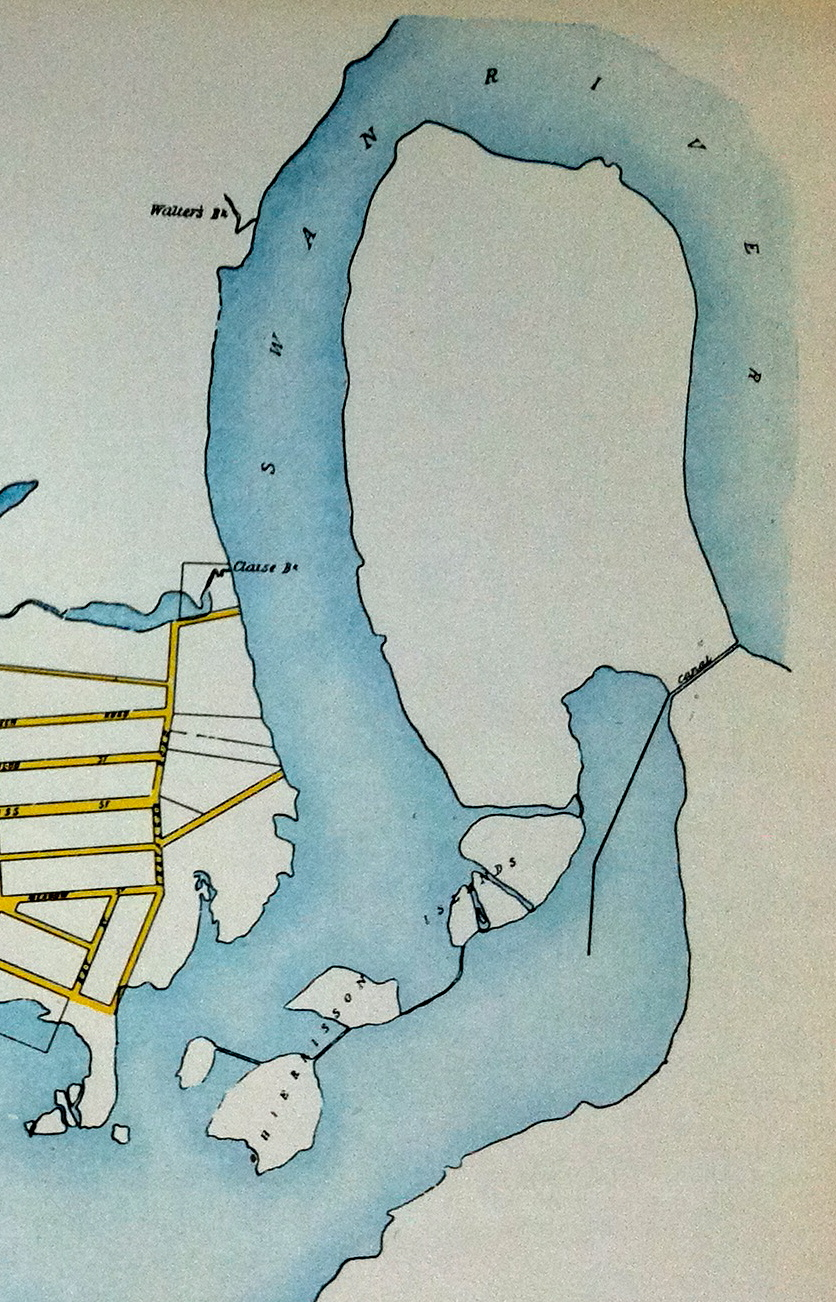
The Heirisson Island area in 1838

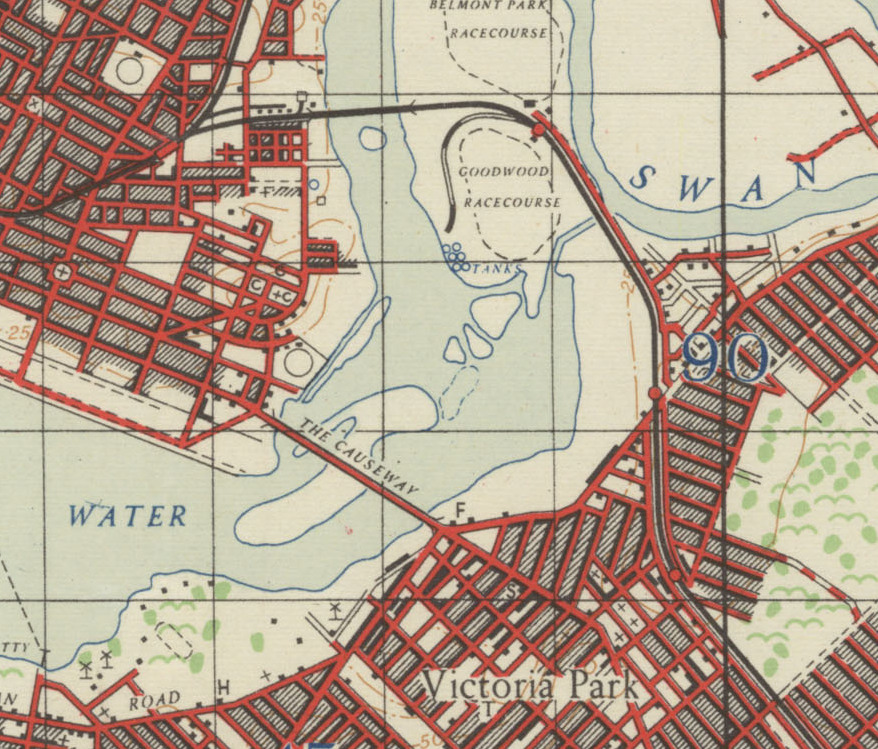
Heirisson Island and surrounds in 1942

Heirisson Island originally consisted of six separate smaller islands surrounded by mudflats. By the 1940s, land reclamation and dredging of the Swan River to create two navigable channels saw the islands coalesce into one large island.

The area around Heirisson Island is traditionally associated with the Beeloo people, a subgroup of the Whadjuk Noongar, who knew the small islands and mudflats as Matagarup, referring to the river as being "one leg deep". The island located on either side of the current causeway bridge was known as Kakaroomup. The Matagarup mudflats were the first major crossing point upriver from the river's mouth (at Fremantle) and were an important seasonal access way over which the Beeloo gave other groups right of passage across the river.

The first European to visit the Heirisson Island area was the Dutch explorer Willem de Vlamingh in January 1697. He was exploring the Swan River in longboats but only got as far as the Heirisson Island(s) because the mudflats impeded any further progress. Heirisson Island was subsequently named after French midshipman François-Antoine Boniface Heirisson, who was on the French ship Naturaliste on a scientific expedition led by Nicolas Baudin between 1801 and 1804. The expedition made several journeys up the river from Fremantle in longboats and made the first maps of the Swan River. The islands were named in June 1801. James Stirling later investigated the area in 1827 just before the Swan River Colony was settled in 1829.

Before becoming a reserve the islands had been host to a shanty town and animals were seen grazing on the islands as late as the 1920s. In the late-1940s plans were drawn for the development of an extensive sporting complex on the now singular island, which was envisioned to feature an athletics stadium, an Olympic swimming pool, and 18 tennis courts; however the venture was dropped following a potential cost blowout. Other proposals for the island throughout the years include those for a motel, a golf course, a caravan park, and a cultural centre with museums and concert halls. In 1966, it was proposed to develop Heirisson Island into an aerodrome for VTOL aircraft. There were also plans to fill in the western channel of the Swan River and join the island to East Perth.

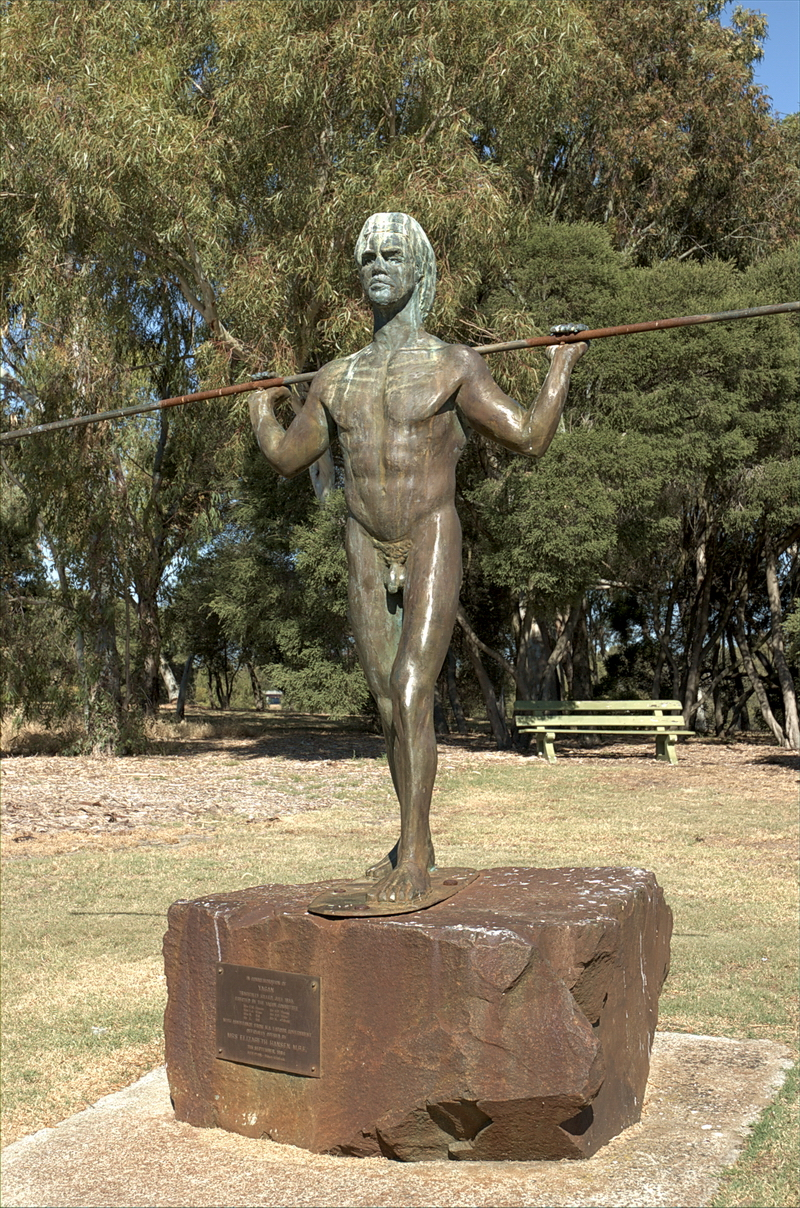
Yagan statue, Heirisson Island

In September 1984 the Government of Western Australia erected a statue of Aboriginal warrior Yagan on the island. In 1997 the statue's head was twice removed by vandals.

In 1998, five female western grey kangaroos were introduced onto the island, followed by a female with a male joey in 2000.

In 2008 a new master plan for Heirisson Island was adopted by the City of Perth that proposed establishing an international quality sculpture park on the island as well as constructing an amphitheatre and a footbridge that would link Point Fraser to Heirisson Island. The plan faced opposition from Aboriginal elders, and as of December 2022 the sculpture park and amphitheatre have yet to be established.

In December 2022, construction of Boorloo Bridge was approved, to connect Point Fraser and McCallum Park in Victoria Park via Heirisson Island. The $100 million pedestrian and cycling bridge project began construction in November 2023, and opened on 22 December 2024.

== Aboriginal protests ==
Heirisson Island has been the site of a number of protests by Aboriginal Australian activists.

=== Tent embassy ===
In 2012, the island was the site of a tent embassy, set up in February by Noongar people to raise community awareness about problems with a government plan to extinguish most of the native title land in the southwest of Western Australia that was recognised in 2006 by Justice Murray Wilcox of the Federal Court of Australia. The Noongar Tent Embassy was intended to be a peaceful affirmation of native title to Noongar country and legitimate use of a state-registered Aboriginal heritage site, and was inspired by the Aboriginal Tent Embassy in Canberra. However, there were many claims made of rocks being thrown at passing boats. The tent embassy was removed by police in March 2012.

=== Refugee camp ===
In early March 2015, a group of Aboriginal activists set up what they referred to as a refugee camp after the state government announced plans to close some remote Western Australian Aboriginal communities. The camp was removed ten days later by City of Perth rangers, with police support, but gradually reassembled and was occupied by about 100 people when it was dismantled again by police and City of Perth rangers in late April 2015.

In January 2016 a group of about 60 people – including some non-Indigenous homeless people – were camping on the island again. By April 2016, the camp had grown to over 100 and it was again removed by police and rangers.

== See also ==
- Islands of Perth, Western Australia

== Sources ==
- Appleyard, R. T.; Manford, Toby (1979). The Beginning: European Discovery and Early Settlement of Swan River, Western Australia. Nedlands: UWA Publishing. LCCN 80670058. OCLC 6423026. Wikidata Q138856067.
- Péron, François; Freycinet, Louis de (1809). A Voyage of Discovery to the Southern Hemisphere: Performed by Order of the Emperor Napoleon during the Years 1801, 1802, and 1804. London: Richard Phillips. OCLC 6521670. OL 6948659M. Wikidata Q128790983.
