= List of cycling records =

List of records completed on a bicycle

Certified and recognized cycling records are those verified by the Union Cycliste Internationale, International Human Powered Vehicle Association and World Human Powered Vehicle Association, Guinness World Records, International Olympic Committee, World UltraCycling Association (formerly Ultra Marathon Cycling Association), the UK Road Records Association or other accepted authorities.

Most records have been completed under special rules and circumstances, such as being motor-paced, on terrain advantageous for speed (such as downhill or low-friction surfaces), using a bicycle with one gear (for example, single-speed bicycles) or using highly aerodynamic cycles (for example, recumbent bicycles). As cycling is a diverse activity with vast differences between equipment, disciplines, and terrain, there is no one record that can popularly be considered a benchmark for “fastest cyclist”. The hour record is generally considered the most prestigious, due to its long history and standardization of rules.

== Top speed record ==
The table below shows the records people have attained while riding bicycles.

=== Land speed record (outdoor) ===
Name	Year	Speed	Type of record
Denise Mueller-Korenek	2018	296.009 km/h (183.931 mph)	Flat surface (outdoor), motor-paced
Neil Campbell	2019	280.571 km/h (174.339 mph)	Flat surface (outdoor), motor-paced, male.
Éric Barone	2017	227.72 km/h (141.50 mph)	Downhill on snow (outdoor), unpaced, on a prototype bicycle
Éric Barone	2015	223.3 km/h (138.8 mph)	Downhill on snow (outdoor), unpaced, on a prototype bicycle
Éric Barone	2000	222.22 km/h (138.08 mph)	Downhill on snow (outdoor), unpaced, on a prototype bicycle
Markus Stöckl	2007	210.4 km/h (130.7 mph)	Downhill on snow (outdoor), unpaced, on a serial production bicycle
Markus Stöckl	2017	167.6 km/h (104.1 mph)	Downhill on a volcano (outdoor), unpaced, on a serial production bicycle
Todd Reichert	2016	144.17 km/h (89.58 mph)	Slight downhill (-0.6% grade) (outdoor), on a Faired Recumbent, unpaced

=== Treadmill speed record (indoor) ===
Name	Year	Speed	Type of record
Bruce Bursford	1996	334.6 km/h (207.9 mph)	Flat surface (indoor), Virtual "motor-paced" (Pedaling on bicycle rollers after being "towed" to 100 mph)

=== History of unpaced records ===
The International Human Powered Vehicle Association (IHPVA) acts as the sanctioning body for new records in human-powered land, water, and air vehicles. It registers non-motor-paced records (also called unpaced), which means that the bicycle directly faces the wind without any motor-pacing vehicle in front.

On land, the speed record registered by a rider on a 200-meter flying start speed trial was 133.28 km/h (82.82 mph) by the Canadian Sam Whittingham riding the Varna Tempest, a streamliner recumbent bicycle in 2009, at Battle Mountain, Nevada. His record has been surpassed by 0.5 km/h by Sebastiaan Bowier of the Netherlands in 2013 setting the new record of 133.78 km/h (83.13 mph). The record was again surpassed on 19 September 2015 by Todd Reichert by riding the ETA, a streamlined recumbent bicycle at 139.45 km/h (86.65 mph) from the team behind the AeroVelo Atlas human-powered helicopter. Todd Reichert broke his own record again on September 17, 2016, to set a speed of 144.17 km/h (89.58 mph) at the 2016 WHPSC.

The female record holder for this same category was Lisa Vetterlein, who reached 107.16 km/h (66.59 mph) in 2005. This record was beaten by Barbara Buatois of France, when she reached 121.44 km/h (75.46 mph) at Battle Mountain in 2009. She subsequently achieved 121.81 km/h (75.69 mph) at the 2010 running of the Battle Mountain event. This record was beaten on 13 sept 2019 by Ilona Peltier of France, at 126.52 km/h (78.62 mph) at the 2019 WHPSC event.

=== History of motor-paced records ===
Motor pacing is a type of cycling record where a pace vehicle is modified by adding a tail fairing to keep the wind off the cyclist who is riding behind it. This type of record was invented by Charles "Mile-a-Minute Murphy" who drafted a train to set a 96 km/h (60 mph) record in 1899. A mile of plywood sheets was attached to the railroad ties, so Charles would have a smooth surface riding behind the train.

In 1928, Leon Vanderstuyft from Belgium reached 122 km/h riding behind a motorbike at a velodrome. Alexis Blanc-Garin from France set the record to 128.20 km/h in October 1933 riding behind a motorbike. Albert Marquet, from France, reached 139.90 km/h riding behind a car in 1937. On 22 October 1938, Alfred Letourneur reached 147 km/h at a velodrome in Montlhéry, France, riding behind a motorbike. On 17 May 1941 Letourneur broke the record again, reaching 175 km/h (109 mph) on a Schwinn bicycle riding behind a specially equipped midget racer, on a Los Angeles freeway near Bakersfield, California.

The first to surpass 200 km/h was the Frenchman Jose Meiffret in 1962, when he reached 204 km/h (127 mph) behind a Mercedes-Benz 300SL car on a German motorway.

Allan Abbott, a cycling enthusiast and motorcycle racer, elevated the motor-paced bicycle speed record at the Bonneville Salt Flats, reaching 223 km/h (139 mph) in 1973. John Howard, Olympic cyclist and Ironman triathlon winner, reset the record to 244 km/h (152 mph), also at the Bonneville Salt Flats, on 20 July 1985.

Fred Rompelberg from Maastricht, Netherlands was the holder of the motor-paced speed world record cycling with 268.831 km/h (167.044 mph) from 1995 to 2018. He used a special bicycle behind a dragster of the Strasburg Drag Racing Team at the Bonneville Salt Flats.

Denise Mueller-Korenek claimed a women's bicycle land speed record at 147 mph (237 km/h) at the Bonneville Salt Flats on 10 September 2016. Mueller was coached by former record holder John Howard. On 17 September 2018, again at Bonneville, she took the outright world record, riding a special KHS bike with a 62Tx12T gear (488 gear-inches) to a new overall record top speed of 183.183 mph (295 km/h) behind a converted rail dragster with a fairing.

=== History of downhill records ===
During the last decade of the 20th century, two Frenchmen, Éric Barone and Christian Taillefer, set the speed record descending on snow several times. On 28 March 2015, Éric Barone reached 223.3 km/h (138.8 mph) at Vars ski resort, France, besting his own record from 2000, using a specially designed prototype bicycle. In 2017 Barone achieved a new downhill record on snow reaching 227.72 km/h using a prototype bicycle.

Using a serial production bicycle, as opposed to prototype bicycles, the record holder is Markus Stöckl from Austria. He set a world speed record in 1999 on snow, descending at 187 km/h (116 mph) at Les Arcs. On 14 September 2007, Stöckl rode an Intense M6 mountainbike down the ski slope of La Parva, Chile, reaching the current record of 210 km/h (130 mph).

The top descending speeds have always been obtained on snow. Apart from that, the ashes of a volcano have been the other surface used. In November 2001, Éric Barone descended on the Cerro Negro volcano in Nicaragua at 130 km/h (81 mph), beating his previous record achieved in Hawaii in 1999. Barone believed he could do more, and returned to the same location on 12 May 2002 when he reached 163 km/h (101 mph) on a serial production bicycle and 172 km/h (107 mph), on a prototype bicycle, a world record. Markus Stöckl did beat the serial production bicycle record in 2011 when he reached 164.95 km/h (102.50 mph) on a volcano in Nicaragua and again in 2017 when he reached 167.6 km/h (104.1 mph) down a volcano in Chile. The prototype bicycle record, on a volcano, still belongs to Barone.

== One hour record ==
The hour record for bicycles is the record for the longest distance cycled in one hour on a bicycle. The most famous type of record is for upright bicycles meeting the requirements of the Union Cycliste Internationale (UCI). Hour-record attempts are made in a velodrome, frequently at high elevation for the aerodynamic benefit of thinner air. Between 1997 and 2014 the UCI retrospectively restricted hour record competitors to roughly the same equipment as was used by Eddy Merckx in his 1972 record. In 2014, the UCI changed the hour record rules to permit using any upright bike allowed for endurance track events. However, other retrospective changes to hour record regulations are why the current hour records are not the farthest absolute distance.

The UCI hour records as of 13 October 2023 are:

- UCI men's record: Filippo Ganna (Italy) , 2022, 56.792 kilometres (35.289 mi)
- UCI women's record: Vittoria Bussi (Italy) , 2023, 50.267 kilometres (31.234 mi)

Another type of record registered by the International Human Powered Vehicle Association (IHPVA) and the World Human Powered Vehicle Association (WHPVA) is for human-powered machines, typically fully streamlined recumbent bicycles. These feature a lower frontal area than a UCI bicycle due to their recumbent seating design of the rider. They enclose the rider and machine in aerodynamic shapes made of carbon fiber, Kevlar, or fiberglass to reduce air resistance. A further type of record is for partially streamlined recumbents, which are open but have either a windshield in front or a streamlined tail-box in the rear. This is registered by the World Recumbent Racing Association (WRRA).

- Streamlined recumbent bicycle (bicycle and rider enclosed in an aerodynamic shell): Francesco Russo of Switzerland set a new World Record by covering 91.556 km (56.890 mi) in one hour at the DEKRA test track in Germany on 2 August 2011. This record is approved by the WHPVA. On 19 July 2009, Sam Whittingham at the Ford Motor Company's 5-mile oval test track in Romeo, Michigan, achieved 90.598 km. This record was approved by the IHPVA and WHPVA committees.
- Non-streamlined Recumbent Bicycle (no shell, only disk wheels, and rider sitting on top frame). The best mark was achieved by Aurelien Bonneteau, a French rider at the Bordeaux velodrome. He rode a bicycle with a nearly horizontal seat to allow his back to lie flat, two standard sized wheels, an elliptical chainring, and shortened pedal arms to reduce the air volume swept out by his legs. His distance was 56.696 km (35.229 mi), on 16 July 2014.

== 24 hours record ==
Please note that some records are made with at least one of the following beneficial factors: streamlined bicycles, being part of a 4x4 relay team, being in other aerodynamically favorable conditions such as behind trucks, special support teams, supplements etc. Different race locations (including elevation), weather conditions, etc. all do come into play.

=== Men's road records ===
Name	Type of record	Distance	Time	Date	Place	Notes & ref.
Charles Terront	Claim	546 kilometres (339 mi)		1879		
George Pilkington Mills		417 kilometres (259 mi)		c. 1890		
Cyril Heppleston	Road	770 kilometres (478 mi)		c. 1938		
Hubert Opperman	Road	814 kilometres (506 mi)		5 December 1939	Melbourne, Australia	
Roy Cromack	Road	816 kilometres (507 mi)	24 hours	1969	UK	
Andreas Clavedertcher (Liechtenstein)	Road	813 kilometres (505 mi)	24 hours			
Michael Secrest	Race Track	1944 kilometers (1216 mi)	24 hours	26/27 April 1990	Phoenix Raceway, US	Outdoors in US by drafting behind 18 wheel truck
Jure Robič	Road	834.77 kilometres (519 mi)	24 hours	19 September 2004	Near Moravske Toplice, Slovenia	Flat 17.44 km circuit.(34.78 km/h)
Jean-Pascal Roux	Road	839 kilometres (521 mi)	24 hours	18 June 2009	Caderousse, France	
Andy Wilkinson	UK time trial	871 kilometres (541 mi)	24 hours	24/25 June 2011		
Stanislav Verstovšek	Road	914.020 kilometres (567.946 mi)	24 hours	2 October 2020	Dobrovnik, Slovenia	
Christoph Strasser	Road	1,026.21 kilometres (637.66 mi)	24 hours	16 July 2021	Zeltweg, Austria	42.75 kilometres per hour (26.56 mph)
Christian von Ascheberg	Human powered vehicle (HPV) land distance	1,218 kilometres (757 mi)	24 hours	1 August 2010	DEKRA test track, Germany	In a Milan SL velomobile
Aidan Lampe	Human powered vehicle (HPV) land distance	1,512.775 kilometres (940 mi)	24 hours	28-29 March	VinFast Vehicle Proving Ground, Australia	In a Phantom Speedbike Mini-T +24 velomobile

=== Women's road record ===
- Beatrice Grimshaw claimed to have broken the women's road record c. 1900 however the distance ridden is unclear, no authority has recognised the record and there are doubts about her claim.
- Edith Atkins set the women's road record at 679 kilometres (422 mi) on 12 July 1953.
- Christine Moody set the women's record at 688.57 kilometres (427.86 mi) in July 1969.
- Sandy Earl set a new road record at 712.07 kilometres (442.46 mi) on 14 August 2011.
- Maria Parker set a new recumbent road record at 755.101 kilometres (469.198 mi) on 13 October 2012.
- Amanda Coker set a new road record at 824.798 kilometres (512.506 mi) on 23 October 2021 becoming the first woman in history to break 500 miles in 24 hours.

=== Men's track record ===
- Dr Mitchell Anderson set the 24 hour outdoor track record at 894.349 kilometres (555.723 mi) at the AARC in Wensleydale, Victoria, Australia on 30 March 2018.
- Ralph Diseviscourt set the 24 hour outdoor track record at 915.4 kilometres (568.8 mi) in Vianden, Luxembourg on 11 July 2020.
- Christoph Strasser set the indoor track record at 941.872 kilometres (585.252 mi) at Velodrome Suisse, Grenchen, Switzerland on 14–15 October 2017.

=== Women's track record ===
- Petra von Fintel set the women's human powered vehicle (HPV) land distance record at 1,011.99 kilometres (628.82 mi) in 24 hours in a Milan velomobile at Klettwitz, Germany on 12 July 2015. In July 2018 Nici Walde claims to have ridden 1,088 kilometres (676 mi) at the Opel Test Center in Rodgau-Dudenhofen, Germany. however as of 31 July 2018 the ride is yet to be recognised by the World Human Powered Vehicle Association.
- Elena Novikova (Ukraine) set the women's indoor track record at 782 kilometres (486 mi), average speed 32.57 kilometres per hour (20.24 mph) at Velodromo Fassa Bortolo Montichiari, Brescia, Italy on 17 September 2017.
- Seana Hogan regained the women's outdoor track record at 717 kilometres (446 mi), average speed 29.89 kilometres per hour (18.57 mph) at Hellyer Park Velodrome San Jose, California, United States on 4 May 2012.

== Around the world record ==
To qualify for the relevant Guinness World Record one must satisfy various requirements, such as total distance travelled, pass through two approximate antipodal points, provide specified evidence, etc.

The fastest known time (FKT) for circumnavigation of the globe by bicycle is awarded for completing a continuous journey around the globe by bicycle and other means, consisting of a minimum 29,000 km (18,000 miles) in total distance cycled.

Current Fastest Known Times (FKTs)
Record	Name	Year	Length (dd:hh:mm)	GWR?
Supported (M)	Mark Beaumont	2017	78:14:40	Yes
Unsupported (F)	Lael Wilcox	2024	108:12:12	Yes
Tandem (M/F)	Steven Massey & Laura Massey-Pugh	2022	179:12:25	Yes
Mixed (F/M)	Caroline Soubayroux & David Ferguson	2022	240:17:25	Yes
Single-speed (M)	Douglas Concha	2024	274:06:52	No
Recumbent (M)	Richard Evans	2014	150:00:00	No
Unicycle (M)	Ed Pratt	2018	1330:00:00	No

== Endurance record ==
=== Men's record ===
In 1911 the weekly magazine Cycling began a competition for the highest number of 100-mile rides or "centuries" in a single year. The winner was Marcel Planes with 332 centuries in which he covered 34,366 miles (55,307 km). The inspiration for the competition was said to be the efforts of Harry Long, a commercial traveller who rode a bicycle on his rounds covering every part of England and Scotland and who covered 25,376 miles (40,839 km) in 1910. The world record for distance cycled in a year began in an era when bicycle companies competed to show their machines were the most reliable. The record has been officially established nine times. A tenth claim, by the English rider Ken Webb in 1972, was disallowed. (Note: Ken Webb's claim was for 80,647 miles (129,789 km) in 1972. Webb insisted he had completed the distance but others said he hadn't and he was removed from the Guinness Book of Records.) Apart from the 1911 competition organised by Cycling, there was no authority that set rules for record attempts nor certified the mileage ridden. In 1937 the League of Victorian Wheelmen declined a request by Ossie Nicholson for patronage for his attempt on the record. Nicholson's response was to appoint a committee to supervise his attempt. The mileage had been traditionally verified by way of a sealed milometer and cards signed by upstanding members of society such as police officers or postmasters.

In November 2014 the UltraMarathon Cycling Association announced that it would recognise a new record category for the highest annual mileage in a year, and set rules for the record. All of the previous record holders from Marcel Planes to Tommy Godwin rode a double-triangle diamond frame bicycle, and their rides all commenced on 1 January. The UltraMarathon Cycling Association decided, however, to permit any bike type except for faired recumbents, and that an attempt may start on any day of the year running for 365 consecutive days. Odometers and cards were replaced by GPS recording and live tracking devices such as the SPOT Satellite Messenger.

In 2015, three cyclists commenced an attempt to beat the record set by Tommy Godwin (cyclist, born 1912). Briton Steve Abraham started his attempt on 1 January, American Kurt Searvogel, nicknamed Tarzan, started 10 January, and Australian Miles Smith started on 18 June. Abraham was hit by a moped rider on 29 March 2015, breaking his leg above the ankle. After two weeks' recovery, Abraham resumed cycling gradually, using just one leg to pedal a recumbent trike. Having lost so much distance, he launched a concurrent attempt on the record starting on 8 August 2015, however he announced on 22 January 2016 that he had ended his concurrent attempt. Abraham rode 63,568 miles (102,303 km) in his calendar year attempt. Smith ceased his attempt on 13 November 2015. Searvogel managed to overcome weather, injury and also married his one-woman support crew Alicia Searvogel, breaking Godwin's mark with five days to spare. Cycling Weekly reported a surprising number of people were less than charitable about Searvogel's amazing feat. Searvogel planned his attempt to hit his final mileage of 76,076 miles exactly, writing "The number is significant in that it took 76 years and 76,076 miles to take the record from the British – The spirit of 76 lives on". This UMCA record is also recognized as a Guinness World Record.

World endurance record for a single year
Year	Record holder	Country	Distance	Ref
1911	Marcel Planes	France	34,366 miles (55,307 km)	
1932	Arthur Humbles	Great Britain	36,007 miles (57,948 km)	
1933	Ossie Nicholson	Australia	43,966 miles (70,756 km)	
1936	Walter Greaves	Great Britain	45,383 miles (73,037 km)	
1937	Bernard Bennett	Great Britain	45,801 miles (73,710 km)	
1937	René Menzies	France	61,561 miles (99,073 km)	
1937	Ossie Nicholson	Australia	62,657 miles (100,837 km)	
1939	Bernard Bennett	Great Britain	65,127 miles (104,812 km)	
1939	Tommy Godwin	Great Britain	75,065 miles (120,805 km)	
2015	Kurt Searvogel	United States	76,076 miles (122,432 km)	
2017	Amanda Coker	United States	86,537 miles (139,268 km)	

=== Women's record ===
During 1938 Billie Dovey, the English 'keep fit girl' of the 1930s, achieved a record 29,899.4 miles (48,118.4 km). Contemporary advertising shows that she rode a Rudge-Whitworth bicycle and relied on Cadbury milk chocolate for energy. Dovey combined the attempt with a lecture tour, often finishing her ride and then giving a fitness lecture in the evening.

In February 1942 Pat Hawkins, the holder of the 'World Seven Days record', claimed to have ridden 45,402.8 miles (73,068.7 km) in Perth, West Australia, despite having missed seven weeks riding. A few days later the claim was withdrawn due to discrepancies in her logs. The press had reported her campaign in relation to Billie Dovey's record, to wit, after ten weeks she had recorded 7,302.8 miles (11,752.7 km) compared to Mrs Dovey's 5,238 miles (8,430 km). She would have reached Dovey's record after 36 weeks, three days, one hour and 20 minutes. The endeavour was sponsored by Bruce Small Pty Ltd.

In 2016, Kajsa Tylen broke the record, exceeding Dovey's mileage on 24 November, with over a month of the year left to go. Guinness did not ratify Billie Dovey's record, and had set a target of over 50,000 km. Tylen cycled all over the UK and Europe, encouraging others to join her every day, and make 'sweat pledges' of support. Tylen set the Guinness World Record for females at 52,025 kilometres (32,327 mi).

On 5 April 2017, the 326th day of her year-long record attempt to ride more miles in a year than anybody ever, Amanda Coker broke the women's, as well as the overall mileage record, when she exceeded Kurt Searvogel's previous record of 76,076 miles (122,432 km). The Guinness Book of World Records certified Coker's record at the end of her record-breaking day at 76,233.9 miles (122,686.6 km). Coker completed her year-long mileage record with 86,537 miles (139,268 km).

On June 4, 2016, Alicia Searvogel became the first woman over 50 years of age to make an attempt the Highest Annual Mileage record. On June 3, 2017, Searvogel finished her attempt with a total of 32,415 miles (52,167 km). While she fell short of breaking Amanda Coker's overall woman's record, Ms. Searvogel was awarded the highest annual mileage record, and highest month mileage record 4,021 miles (6,471 km) in the 50–59 age category by the UMCA (now WUCA).

== Long-distance records ==
=== Pembroke to Great Yarmouth ===
Pembroke to Great Yarmouth is the traversal of the whole width of the island of Wales and England between two extremities; Starting in Pembroke in the West and finishing in Great Yarmouth in the East. The record is also known as the Side to Side record. The distance by road using the traditional route is 349 miles (562 km) and the records are maintained by the Road Records Association. Some of its current records are:

- Upright bicycle: In October 2018 Nick Clarke claimed the record in 15h 23m 59s.
- Women's record: Maria Bloom, 2004, 16h 51m 56s.
- Men's Tandem bicycle Record: Tim Bayley & Adam Broyad, 2019, 14h 15m 20s.

=== Land's End to John O'Groats ===
Land's End to John O'Groats is the traversal of the whole length of the island of Great Britain between two extremities; in the southwest and northeast. The distance by road using the traditional route is 874 miles (1,407 km) and the records are maintained by the Road Records Association. Some of its current records are:

- Upright bicycle: In June 2018 Michael Broadwith claimed the record in 43h 25m 13s.
- Faired recumbent bicycle: Andy Wilkinson, 1996, 41h 4m 22s.
- Women's record: Christina Mackenzie, 2021, 51h 5m 5s.
- Women's tricycle record: Jane Moore, 2014, 88h 45m 21s.
- Men's Tandem Record: D Irvine & C Mitchell, 2015, 45h 11m 0s.
- Mixed Tandem Record: A Wilkinson & L E A Taylor (Lynne Biddulph), 2000, 51h 19m 23s.

=== Return journey between Land's End and John O'Groats ===
Ben Rockett claimed to have set a record of 141h 8m 0s for an upright bicycle from Land's End to John O'Groats to Land's End, being the return journey of Land's End to John O'Groats. The distance by road using the traditional route is 1,748 miles (2,813 km). The precise route he took is not clear as his website says the distance ridden was 1,880 miles (3,030 km). Its status as a record however was dubious as no recognised authority certified the record.

In September 2017 James MacDonald set a Guinness world record, starting and finishing at John O'Groats. Guinness certified the record as covering 1,725 miles (2,776 km) in 5 days 18 hours and 3 minutes, beating Rockett's time by 3 hours and 5 minutes.

On 3 September 2020, Marcia Roberts became the first female to record the journey starting at Lands End, by bike, in a time of 11 days, 13 hours & 13 minutes and set a Guinness World Record. On 16 July 2023, Louise Harris successfully completed the return journey in 10 days 5 hours, breaking the original record by over 1 day 8 hours.

Sarah Ruggins cycled from John O'Groats to Land End and back in 5 days, 11 hours and 14 minutes in May 2025. This was 6h 49m faster than the previous allcomers' record and five days faster than the previous women's record.

=== One thousand miles ===
On 13 March 1940 Pat Hawkins set the 'World 1,000 mile record' in Perth, having ridden the 1,609 km distance in 4 days, 8 hours and 7 minutes, cutting 9 hours 53 minutes off Vera Unthank's record.

- Men's record: Gethin Butler, 2001. After setting the Lands End to John O'Groats record in 2001 Gethin Butler continued to ride, completing 1000 miles in 55 hours 59 minutes 0 seconds.
- Women's record: Lynne Taylor, 2001. After setting the women's Lands End to John O'Groats record, Lynne Taylor continued to ride, completing 1000 miles in 64 hours and 38 minutes.

=== Race Across America ===
Race Across America is an ultra marathon bicycle race across the United States that started in 1982. The fastest average speed records are:

- Solo man: Christoph Strasser, 2014, who averaged 16.42 mph (26.43 km/h) riding 3,020 miles (4,860 km) in 7 days, 15 hours, and 56 minutes.
- Solo woman: Seana Hogan, 1995, who averaged 13.23 mph (21.29 km/h) riding 2,912 miles (4,686 km) in 9 days, 4 hours, 2 minutes.

=== Seven days ===
On Sunday 17 March 1940 Pat Hawkins, an 18-year-old female from Western Australia, set the 'World Seven Days record' in Perth, having ridden 1,546.8 miles (2,489.3 km) to surpass the previous best (1,438.4 miles (2,314.9 km)) set by Mrs Valda Unthank of Hastings, Victoria. Hawkins also broke the West Australian records for one, two, three, four, five, six and seven days, plus surpassing the Australian professional men's record of Ossie Nicholson. No authority appears to maintain this record, however notable distances ridden in seven days include:

- Tommy Godwin rode 2,084 miles (3,354 km) between 16 and 22 July 1939.
- Bruce Berkeley rode 2,825 kilometres (1,755 mi) between 23 and 29 June 2014. (Note: "Bruce Berkeley rides nearly 10,000km in January to set new Guinness World Record". road.cc. 2 February 2015. Road.cc has subsequently said they were incorrect and Berkeley does not hold Guinness World Records for the greatest distances cycled in a week and in a month.)
- Richard Nutt rode 2,830 kilometres (1,760 mi) between 1 and 7 June 2015.
- James Golding rode 2,842.2 kilometres (1,766.1 mi) between 19 and 25 June 2017.
- Bruce Berkeley rode 3,333.3 kilometres (2,071.2 miles) between 6 and 12 January 2020.
- Matthieu Bonne rode 3,619.7 kilometres (2,249.2 miles) between 20 and 26 March 2023.

=== Circumnavigation of Great Britain ===
In his book, 22 Days Around the Coast of Britain, Nick Sanders documented his 1984 journey round the coastline of Great Britain in preparation for an attempt to cycle round the world in 80 days. His record of 4802 miles in 22 days was included in the Guinness Book of World Records, but is no longer recognised by record keeping bodies, such as the World Ultra Cycling Association (recognised by Guinness World Records since 2021 as the official authority for ultra distance cycling records), due to changes in rules and verification standards.

On 6 July 2025, Molly Weaver completed the circumnavigation in 21 days, 10 hours and 48 minutes, beating the existing record by 17 hours and setting a new record (subject to verification by WUCA).

=== One month ===
There are 2 authorities currently recognising this record, Guinness World Records and World Ultra Cycling Association (formerly the UltraMarathon Cycling Association). Tommy Godwin rode 8,583 miles (13,813 km) in July 1939, on his way to setting the World Endurance record for a single year however no authority has recognised this as a record. Current record holders are:

- WUCA record holder Amanda Coker rode 8,012.4 miles (12,894.7 km) in April 2017.
- Guinness World Record holder Janet Davison rode 4,010 miles (6,450 km) between 24 July and 22 August 2015.
- WUCA male record holder Steven Abraham rode 7,104.3 miles (11,433.3 km) between 2 September and 1 October 2016.
- Guinness World Record holder Arvid Loewen (Canada) rode 7,219 miles (11,618 km) between 1 and 30 July 2020, travelling from Winnipeg to Halifax, Nova Scotia to Vancouver (via Winnipeg) and back to Winnipeg.

=== 100,000 miles ===
On 11 July 2017, 24-year-old Amanda Coker set a new "Fastest completion of 100,000 miles by bicycle record, doing so in 423 days. Coker's record improved by 77 days on Tommy Godwin's prior record of 500 days set in May 1940. The record was certified by the Guinness Book of Records and the Ultra Marathon Cycling Association (now the WUCA).

=== The length of Europe ===
On 19 June 2026, Sarah Ruggins completed the ride from Tarifa (Spain) to Nordkapp (Norway), riding 6020.41 km in 13 days, 20 hours, and 27 minutes (pending verification). The previous overall record was held by Ian Walker, riding from north to south in 2019 in 16 days, 20 hours, and 59 minutes.

== Racing event records ==
The following is a list of road bicycle racing achievements and records:

=== One-day and stage races ===
- Grand Tour wins: Eddy Merckx (11), Bernard Hinault (10), Jacques Anquetil (8)
- Tour de France wins: Miguel Induráin (5 consecutive), Eddy Merckx (5), Bernard Hinault (5), Jacques Anquetil (5), Tadej Pogačar (5; 3 consecutive)
- Giro d'Italia wins: Alfredo Binda (5; 3 consecutive), Fausto Coppi (5), Eddy Merckx (5; 3 consecutive)
- Vuelta a España wins: Roberto Heras (4; 3 consecutive), Primož Roglič (4; 3 consecutive)
- Tour de France yellow jerseys: Eddy Merckx (96), Bernard Hinault (75), Tadej Pogačar (71), Miguel Induráin (60), Chris Froome (59), Jacques Anquetil (50), Antonin Magne (38), Nicolas Frantz and Philippe Thys (37)
- Giro d'Italia pink jersey: Eddy Merckx (78), Alfredo Binda (60), Francesco Moser (57), Gino Bartali (50), Giuseppe Saronni (49), Jacques Anquetil (42), Fausto Coppi and Bernard Hinault (31)
- Vuelta a España red jersey: Alex Zülle (48), Primož Roglič (42), Roberto Heras (34), Delio Rodríguez and Gustaaf Deloor (32)
- Grand Tour stage wins: Eddy Merckx (64), Mario Cipollini (57), Mark Cavendish (55)
- Triple Crown of Cycling: Eddy Merckx (1974), Stephen Roche (1987), Tadej Pogačar (2024)
- Monument wins: Eddy Merckx (19), Tadej Pogačar (13), Roger De Vlaeminck (11), Costante Girardengo (9), Fausto Coppi (9), Sean Kelly (9)
- Single Monument wins: Eddy Merckx (7× Milan–San Remo)
- Most road races won by a professional cyclist: Eddy Merckx (525), Rik van Looy (379), Francesco Moser (273), Rik van Steenbergen (270), Roger de Vlaeminck (259)
- UCI Road World Championships: Alfredo Binda (3× gold, 1× bronze), Rik van Steenbergen (3× gold, 1× bronze), Óscar Freire (3× gold, 1× bronze), Eddy Merckx (3× gold), Peter Sagan (3× gold)

=== Classifications and awards ===
- Challenge Desgrange-Colombo (1948-1958): Ferdinand Kübler, Fred De Bruyne (3)
- Super Prestige Pernod (1959-1987): Eddy Merckx (7)
- UCI Road World Cup (1989-2004): Paolo Bettini (3)
- UCI Road World Rankings (1984-2004): Sean Kelly (5)
- UCI ProTour/UCI World Tour (2005-2018): Alejandro Valverde (4)
- UCI World Ranking (from 2016): Tadej Pogačar (5)
- Vélo d'Or awards (from 1992): Alberto Contador (4)

== Wheelie record ==
The longest bicycle wheelie in one hour is 30.95 km (19.23 mi), and was achieved by Manuel Scheidegger (Switzerland) in Bern, Switzerland on 12 September 2020.

Kurt Osburn (nicknamed Wheelie King) from California, United States is the Guinness World Record holder for Longest Bicycle Wheelie, riding on the back wheel of a bicycle. On 8 August 1998, he rode a wheelie for a record 11 hours at the Anaheim Convention Center, California. In June 2012 David "Pixie" Robilliard failed to break the record.

From 13 April to 25 June 1999, Kurt rode 2,839.6 miles from Hollywood to the Guinness World Records Experience in Orlando on one wheel, also for a Guinness World Record, becoming the first person in history to ride a bicycle wheelie coast to coast. During his attempt he rode an average of 50 miles per day, sometimes with winds in excess of 40 miles per hour. Other facts: He cycled on the 110 Highway, had 4 flat tires (on the rear tire), over 1.8 million pedal revolutions from start to finish, and was chased by dogs almost daily.
