= Ossie Nicholson =

Australian cyclist (1910–1965)

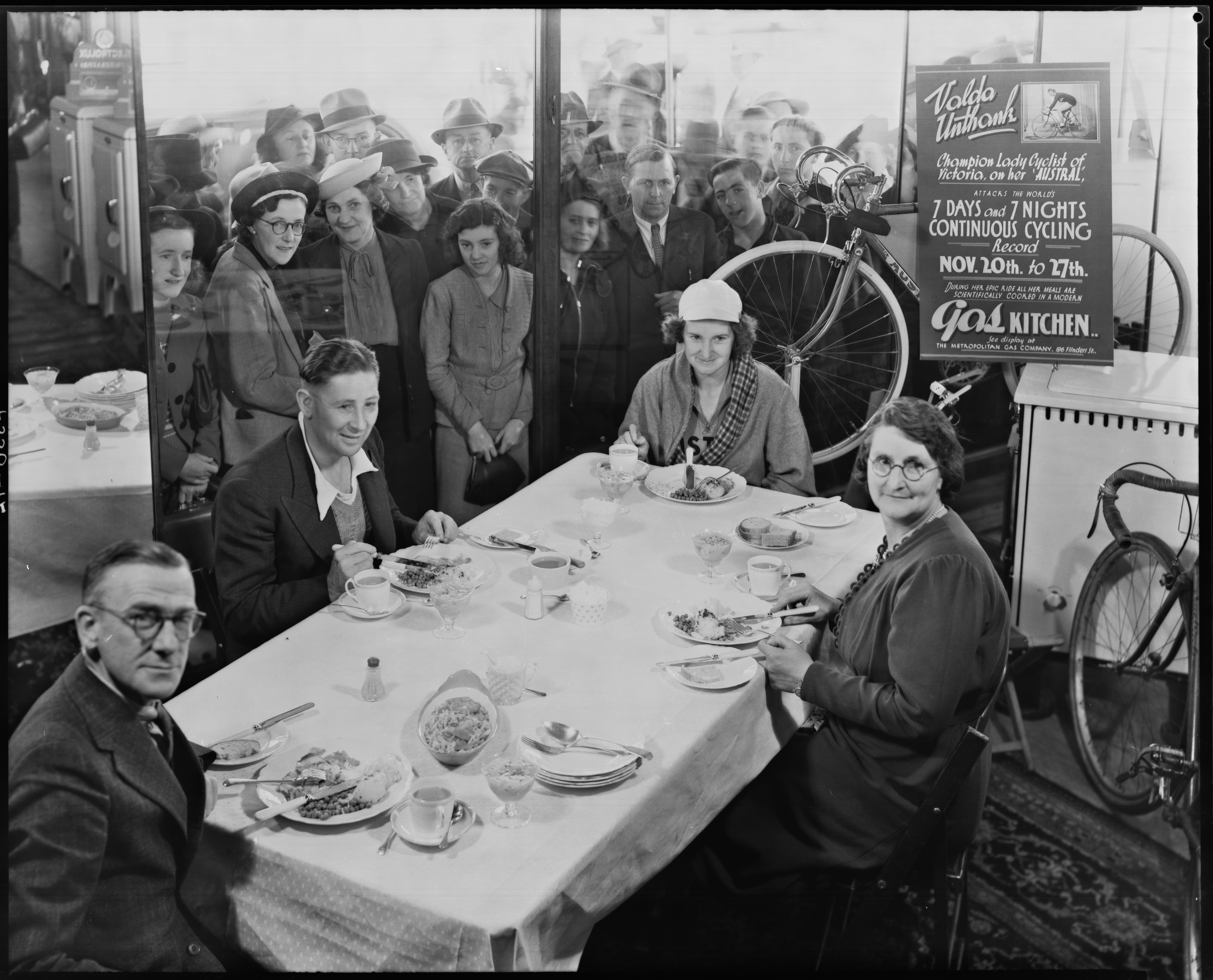
- Ossie Nicholson sitting at dining table with Valda Unthank, Jack O'Donohue (publicity manager for Bruce Small Ltd) and Mrs M Smith (Vic Women Cyclists Union)

Personal information
- Full name: Oserick Bernard Nicholson
- Nicknames: Ossie, pocket Hercules
- Born: 1910 Lachlan, Tasmania, Australia
- Died: 9 November 1965 (aged 54–55) Henderson, Auckland New Zealand

Cycling career
- Sport: Cycling
- Disciplines: Road & track
- Role: Rider
- Rider type: Endurance

Major wins
- World Endurance record for a single year 43,966 miles (70,756 km) in 1933. 365 consecutive 100 miles (160 km) rides in 1933. World Endurance record for a single year 62,657 miles (100,837 km) in 1937

Oserick Bernard "Ossie" Nicholson (1910 – 9 November 1965) was an Australian cyclist who twice held the World Endurance record for distance in a calendar year.

== Australian cycling career ==
Nicholson was a professional cyclist in the years before World War II. He competed on both road and track, as was typical of Australian cyclists of the era such as Hubert Opperman and Richard Lamb.

Nicholson was third in the 1929 Warrnambool to Melbourne Classic, behind Opperman and Horrie Marshall and won the 1929 Wangaratta to Melbourne race. In February 1930 Nicholson rode 55.5 miles (89.3 km) to break the Australian one hour motor-paced cycling record, previously held by Opperman. The following week Opperman narrowly defeated Nicholson in a 10 miles (16 km) motor-paced match race. In September 1930 Nicholson broke the record for Canberra to Melbourne completing the 417 miles (671 km) in 26 hours 19 minutes. A week later Nicholson set the fastest time in the 116 miles (187 km)Tour of Gippsland.

In 1934 Nicholson was training Billie Samuel to break records. In the same year he was suspended for six months for interfering with E Waterford who was making a record attempt from Adelaide to Melbourne. The suspension was extended to 12 months as Nicholson unsuccessfully appealed. Nicholson was able to have the suspension lifted in time to ride in the Centenary 1000. The Centenary 1000 was a one-week race over seven stages covering 1,102 miles (1,773 km). The race was run in as part of the celebrations of the Centenary of Victoria. In stage 2 there was a crash at a railway crossing a few miles from Penshurst involving Nicholson, Joe Buckley and Bill Brewer. Nicholson suffered a severe head injury, completing the stage despite suffering from concussion, but abandoning the race at Stawell.

In 1938 Nicholsen set the Australian men's seven day record, riding 1,507 miles (2,425 km).

== 1931 Tour de France ==
Nicholson rode in the 1931 Tour de France in a combined Australia/Switzerland team including Opperman, Lamb and Frankie Thomas. In the third stage Nicholson's crank broke. The 18 km walk for a new crank meant Nicholson finished outside the time limit and was eliminated.

== World endurance record for distance cycled in a single year ==
In 1911 the weekly magazine Cycling began a competition for the highest number of 100 mile rides or "centuries" in a single year. The winner was Marcel Planes with 332 centuries in which he covered 34,366 miles (55,307 km). A.R. Peebles of England had the highest number of consecutive centuries with 268.

In 1932 the record for the greatest distance cycled in a single year was set by Arthur Humbles of Great Britain with 36,007 miles (57,948 km).

Malvern Star was a sponsor of Nicholson, so when he agreed to undertake the record attempt in 1933 with Bruce Small as his manager and promoter, Malvern Star supplied the bicycle with the latest equipment, the first derailleur to be available in Australia, a 3-speed made by the Cyclo Gear Company. Nicholson was a tyre tester for Dunlop Rubber who supplied his tyres. In 1937 the League of Victorian Wheelmen declined a request by Nicholson for patronage for his attempt on the record. Nicholson's response was to appoint a committee to supervise his attempt. Nicholson's initial target was 110 miles (180 km) for a total of 40,150 miles (64,620 km). He predominantly rode from Melbourne to Portsea. A car collided with Nicholson on 12 December 1933, but despite a trip to hospital Nicholson was able to continue his rides without interruption. Nicholson raised the record to 43,966 miles (70,756 km).

Nicholson rode more than 100 miles (160 km) on every day and in doing so broke the record for the highest number of consecutive centuries, held by A.R. Peebles. It appears that Nicholson's record was unmatched until 2017. (Note: While Tommy Godwin rode an average of 205 miles (330 km) per day in 1939, there were four days in which he rode less than 100 miles (160 km), 28 October, 15, 25 and 31 December 1939.; When Kurt Searvogel set the distance record in 2015-16, there were five days in which he rode less than 100 miles (160 km), 13 March, 16 & 17 April, 27 August and 4 October 2015.; Amanda Coker rode more than 100 miles (160 km) every day between 2 September 2016 and 7 November 2017.)

For his efforts, Nicholson received £25 from Cyclo and a gold watch from Dunlop. Nicholson is reported to have received an unspecified honorarium from an unnamed "English sportsman" for the period he held the record.

Nicholson's record was broken in 1936 by Walter Greaves of Great Britain with 45,383 miles (73,037 km).

On New Year's Day 1937, Nicholson rode off on the difficult journey to wrest back the record. Bernard Bennett and René Menzies were also attempting to break the record. Nicholson's initial target was 150 miles (240 km) per day for a total of 54,750 miles (88,110 km). Nicholson developed a lead however Menzies had drawn level in October 1937, as both passed Greaves' distance. Each of the three riders beat Greaves' mark with Bennett riding 45,801 miles (73,710 km) and Menzies riding 61,561 miles (99,073 km). Nicholson regained the record with 62,657 miles (100,837 km). The record was broken in 1939 by Tommy Godwin with 75,065 miles (120,805 km).

He died in November 1965 in Auckland, New Zealand from a heart attack.
