= Stöckl =

Stöckl or Stoeckl is a surname. Notable people with the surname include:

- Albert Stöckl, German philosopher and theologian
- Eduard de Stoeckl (1820–1883), Russian diplomat
- Ernst Stöckl (1912–2000), Austrian chess player
- Ingrid Stöckl
- Markus Stöckl
