= Éric Barone =

French cyclist (born 1960)

Personal information
- Nickname: Le Baron Rouge (The Red Baron)
- Born: 4 November 1960 (age 65) Oyonnax, France

Cycling career
- Sport: Cycling
- Rider type: High speed specialist

Éric Barone (born 4 November 1960 in Oyonnax, France) is a French cyclist. He holds the world downhill speed record for bicycle, on both snow and gravel. On snow, his downhill speed record is 227.720 kilometres per hour (141.499 mph) achieved on 18 March 2017, on the speed snow track at Vars, France while on gravel his downhill speed record is 172 kilometres per hour (107 mph), achieved at the Cerro Negro volcano, in Nicaragua. His French nickname is "Baron Rouge", which means Red Baron.

== Early career highlights ==
After some initial jobs, including acting as stunt double of actors Sylvester Stallone, Jean-Claude Van Damme and Adrian Paul, at 34 he started trying to achieve speed records on a bicycle. Barone achieved the downhill record on snow in 1994, beating the previous record by Christian Taillefer. He broke the record again in 1999 and on 21 April 2000, when he reached 222 kilometres per hour (138 mph) at Les Arcs ski resort, France, using an aerodynamic prototype bicycle, helmet and clothing.

In 1999 he reached 118 kilometres per hour (73 mph) on gravel in Hawaii. After that, his goal was to show he could be faster on gravel. He discovered the Cerro Negro volcano in Nicaragua. Its clean slopes and soft volcanic ash were ideal.

== Record setting ==
In November 2001, he descended that volcano at 130 kilometres per hour (81 mph), beating his previous record achieved in Hawaii. Barone believed he could do more, and decided to try again some time later. On 12 May 2002, he reached 163 kilometres per hour (101 mph) on his first attempt, on a serial production bicycle. A few minutes later, he descended again, on a prototype bicycle. He rode 400 metres (1,300 ft), and just after the computers had registered 172 kilometres per hour (107 mph), the bike sharply entered a section of the hill with a lower gradient, causing the front bicycle fork to break off, and the bicycle and rider to crash hard and tumble down the hill at high speed. The helmet saved his life, but he had several broken ribs and other injuries. Barone said he would never descend again at the Cerro Negro, but announced he was willing to beat again the record on snow in the future. The record using a serial production bicycle on gravel was beaten in 2011, when Markus Stöckl reached 164.95 kilometres per hour (102.50 mph) on a volcano in Nicaragua. The prototype bicycle record, on gravel, still belongs to Barone.

During his career, Barone has descended the slopes of Mount Fuji in Japan, Mauna Kea and Kilauea in Hawaii, Etna and Stromboli in Sicily, the Nevado de Toluca in Mexico, and 20 volcanoes in Nicaragua.

== Other work ==
After his records, Barone has worked attracting tourists who want to discover the Volcano route and other sites in Nicaragua.

== See also ==
- Cycling records
