= Joyce Barry =

Australian cyclist (1919–1999)

Joyce Beryl Barry
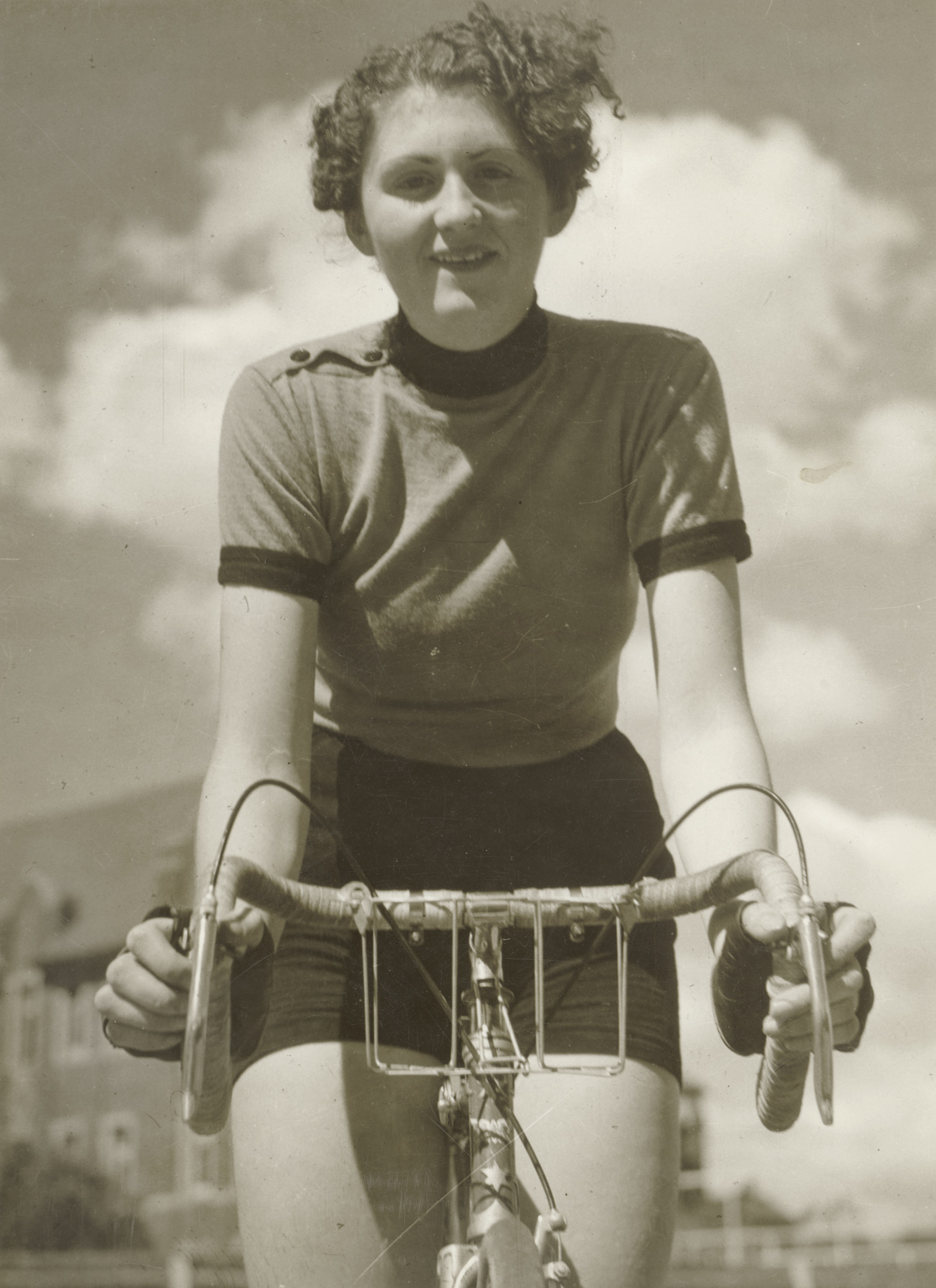
- Joyce Barry, 1937

Personal information
- Born: March 1919
- Died: 23 November 1999 (aged 80)

Cycling career
- Sport: Cycling
- Disciplines: Road & track
- Role: Rider
- Rider type: Endurance

Professional team
- Malvern Star

Joyce Barry (March 1919 – 23 November 1999) was an Australian cyclist who held numerous records for long-distance cycling, most notably the women's seven-day record.

== Biography ==
Barry was born in March 1919, the third daughter of Mr and Mrs James Barry.

In 1936 the 17-year-old Barry announced her intention to challenge the Sydney to Melbourne record of 3 days 1 hour, set in 1935 by Billie Samuel, and she soon came to the attention of Hubert Opperman. Barry was sponsored by Malvern Star and the NSW Milk Board.

Her preparation for the Sydney to Melbourne ride included tackling the ride from Newcastle to Sydney in July 1937, covering the 104.6 miles (168.3 km) in 6 hrs 34 min 36 s, with a massage while on the ferry across the Hawkesbury River being sufficient to recover from leg cramps. The next ride in her preparation was to tackle the 168 miles (270 km) from Orange in August 1937, which she completed in 10 hrs 19 min 26 s. Along the way Barry completed the 131 miles (211 km) from Bathurst to Sydney in 8 hrs 2 min 56 s, which Malvern Star were quick to promote in advertising.

12 months after her announcement, Barry succeeded in breaking the Sydney to Melbourne record, covering the 568 miles (914 km) in 2 days 2 hrs. Along the way established a new record of Sydney to Albury in 33 hrs 55 mins and Albury to Melbourne in 16 hrs 52 mins. Once again Malvern Star were quick to promote her success.

The following year Barry traveled to Tasmania, setting a record in May 1938 for the ride from Launceston to Hobart and return, covering 245 miles (394 km) in 17 hrs 30 min 30 sec. In June Barry went to Queensland, this time to claim the record for Brisbane to Rockhampton covering the 483 miles (777 km) in 56 hrs 29 min. followed by Stanthorpe to Brisbane in July, riding the 185 miles (298 km) in 11 hrs 46 min, continuing on to claim the Australian women's 12 hour record of 189.5 miles (305.0 km).

Returning to Sydney in September 1938 Barry established the women's seven day record of 1,107 miles (1,782 km). Her record was eclipsed in November 1939 by the next Malvern Star woman rider, Valda Unthank who rode 1,438.5 miles (2,315.0 km).

Barry died in November 1999, aged 80.

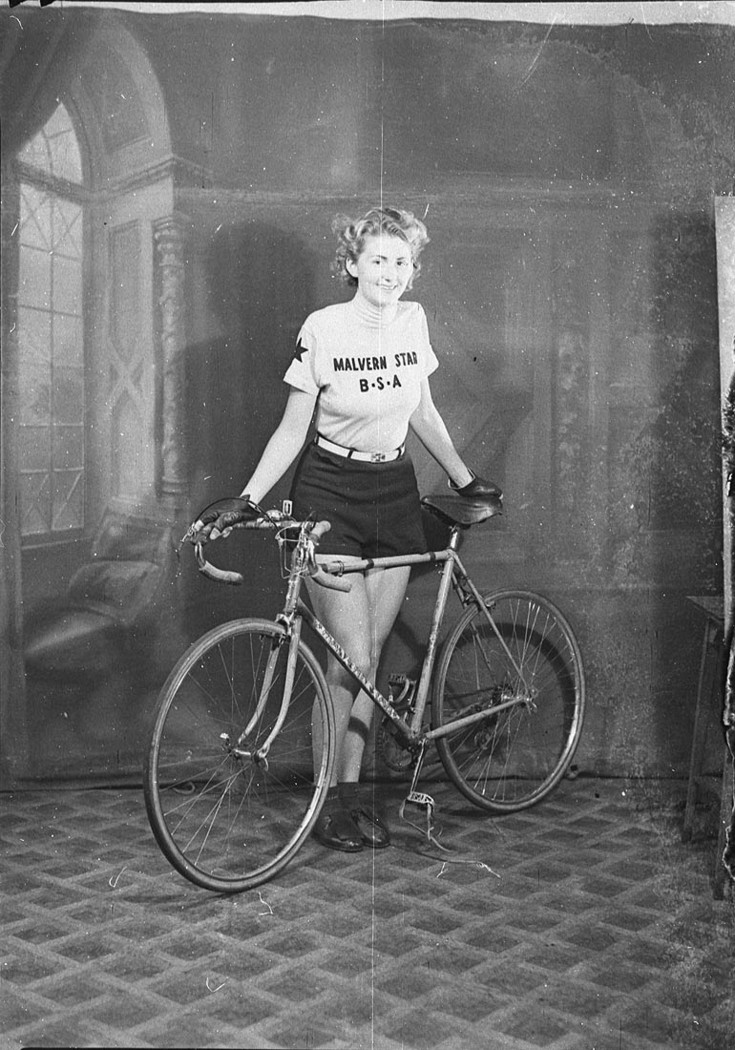
Joyce Barry milk promotion

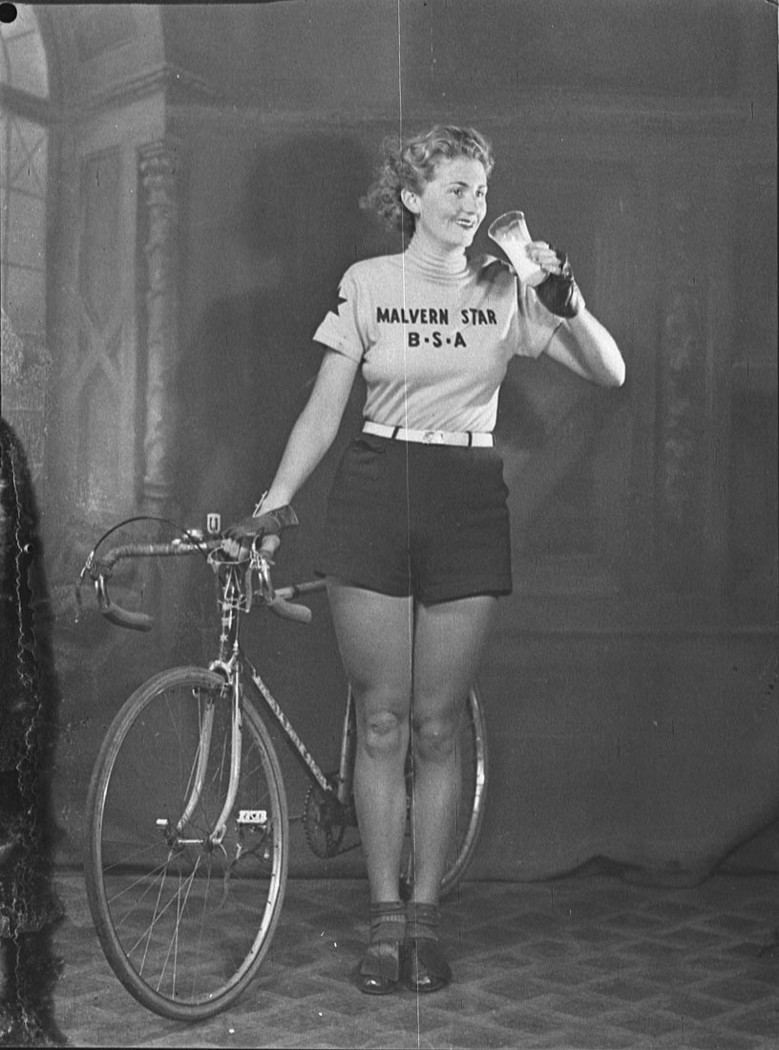
Joyce Barry milk promotion
