= Tommy Godwin (cyclist, born 1912) =

English endurance cyclist

- Godwin in 1939

Personal information
- Full name: Thomas Edward Godwin
- Born: 1912 United Kingdom
- Died: 1975 (aged 62–63)

Cycling career
- Sport: Cycling
- Discipline: Road – Endurance rider
- Role: Rider
- Rider type: All-rounder

Amateur teams
- 1926–1938: Potteries CC
- ^Birchfield CC
- ^Rickmansworth CC

Professional teams
- 1939–1940: Rickmansworth CC
- ^Raleigh-Sturmy Archer

Major wins
- More than 200 Amateur and Professional; Road and Time Trial Events World Endurance record for a single year: 75,065 miles (120,805 km) in 1939; World Endurance record for 100,000 miles (160,000 km) in 500 days (May 1940)

Thomas Edward Godwin (1912–1975) was an English cyclist who held the world cycling record for most miles covered in a year (75,065 miles or 120,805 kilometres) and the fastest completion of 100,000 mi (160,000 km).

In 1939, Godwin entered the Golden Book of Cycling as the greatest long-distance rider in the world. He rode 75,065 mi (120,805 km) in a year, averaging over 200 miles (320 km) per day. This record stood until 2016.

== Early life ==
Godwin was born in 1912 in Stoke on Trent. To help support his family he worked as a delivery boy for a greengrocer (or newsagent) and with the job came a heavy bike with metal basket. The basket was hacked off and the 14-year-old Godwin won his first 25-mile (40 km) time trial in 65 minutes.

== Cycling ==
=== Amateur career ===
After his initial time trial success he subsequently clocked inside 1 hour 2 minutes for 25 miles on four occasions, and covered 236 miles in 12 hours.

In 1933 he finished 7th in the Best All-rounder road riding competition, open to all amateur cyclists in the United Kingdom. His average speed was 21.255 mph. His individual performances were:

- 50 miles, 2 hours 10 mins 12 secs, (23.077 mph)
- 100 miles, 4hrs, 40 mins, 6 secs, (21.428 mph)
- 12 hours – 231 5/8 miles. (19.25 mph)

=== Professional career ===
Godwin left his amateur status at Potteries CC to join Rickmansworth Cycling Club as a professional. After more than 200 road and time trial wins, the mileage record beckoned.

=== World endurance records ===
In 1911 the weekly magazine Cycling began a competition for the highest number of 100-mile rides or "centuries" in a single year. The winner was Marcel Planes with 332 centuries in which he covered 34,366 miles (55,307 km). The inspiration for the competition was said to be the efforts of Harry Long, a commercial traveller who rode a bicycle on his rounds covering every part of England and Scotland and who covered 25,376 miles (40,839 km) in 1910. The world record for distance cycled in a year began in an era when bicycle companies competed to show their machines were the most reliable. The record was officially established nine times up to 1939. A tenth claim in 1972, by the English rider Ken Webb, was later disallowed. (Note: Ken Webb's claim was for 80,647 miles (129,789 km) in 1972. Webb insisted he had completed the distance but others said he hadn't and he was removed from the Guinness Book of Records.)

In January 2016 Godwin's very long-standing record was broken. The American Kurt Searvogel completed 76,076 miles (122,432 km) in one year, confirmed by the Ultramarathon Cycling Association, and this was later also recognised by the Guinness Book of Records.

World Endurance record for a single year
Year	Record holder	Gender	Country	Distance	Ref
1911	Marcel Planes	Male	France	34,366 miles (55,307 km)	
1932	Arthur Humbles	Male	Great Britain	36,007 miles (57,948 km)	
1933	Ossie Nicholson	Male	Australia	43,966 miles (70,756 km)	
1936	Walter Greaves	Male	Great Britain	45,383 miles (73,037 km)	
1937	Bernard Bennett	Male	Great Britain	45,801 miles (73,710 km)	
1937	René Menzies	Male	France	61,561 miles (99,073 km)	
1937	Ossie Nicholson	Male	Australia	62,657 miles (100,837 km)	
1938	Billie Dovey	Female	Great Britain	29,604 miles (47,643 km)	
1939	Bernard Bennett	Male	Great Britain	65,127 miles (104,812 km)	
1939	Tommy Godwin	Male	Great Britain	75,065 miles (120,805 km)	
2015	Kurt Searvogel	Male	United States	76,076 miles (122,432 km)	
2016	Kajsa Tylen	Female	Great Britain	32,526 miles (52,346 km)	
2017	Amanda Coker	Female	United States	86,573.2 miles (138,517.2 km)	

In 1937 the Australian Ossie Nicholson had regained his record from Briton Walter Greaves by covering 62,657.6 mi (100,837.6 km). At 5 am on 1 January 1939 Godwin set out to bring the record home. He wasn't alone; two other British riders started that day, Edward Swann and Bernard Bennett. Swann crashed after 939.6 mi (1,512.1 km), but Bennett fought it out with Godwin for the rest of the year. In sportsmanship their support teams, which included pace-makers, stopped at 50,000 mi (80,000 km) to let the riders complete the attempt on personal merit. Godwin was sponsored by the Raleigh Bicycle Company and Sturmey-Archer.

Godwin's bike weighed more than 30 pounds (14 kg). As war came, he rode through blackouts, his lights taped to a glow. Silk knickers were substituted for chamois inserts and Godwin maintained his vegetarian diet. For the first two months, Godwin's mileage lagged 922 mi (1,484 km) behind Nicholson's schedule. Godwin increased his daily average beyond 200 mi (320 km) a day, and on 21 June 1939 completed 361 mi (581 km) in 18 hours, his longest ride of the record.

On 26 October 1939, Godwin rode into Trafalgar Square having completed 62,658 mi (100,838 km), gaining the record with two months to spare. He rode through the winter to complete 75,065 mi (120,805 km) in the year.

In May 1940 after 500 days' riding he secured the 100,000-mile (160,000 km) record as well. Godwin dismounted and spent weeks learning how to walk before going to war in the RAF.

=== Later career ===
Godwin returned to cycling in 1945, keen to race as an amateur. However, despite a petition by fellow cyclists, the governing bodies ruled that having ridden as a professional he was barred from amateur status. Godwin became trainer and mentor to the Stone Wheelers. Godwin died aged 63, returning from a ride to Tutbury Castle with friends.

== Commemoration ==
Godwin is commemorated by a plaque at Fenton Manor Sports Centre in Stoke on Trent that was unveiled in March 2005 by Edie Hemmings, the culmination of a 30-year campaign by her late husband, George.

=== Citation in the Golden Book ===
Godwin entered the Golden Book of Cycling on 31 December 1939. This recognised his record-breaking exploits for averaging over 200 miles a day for a year.
