= Walter Greaves =

Walter Greaves may refer to:

- Walter Greaves (cyclist) (1907–1987), British cyclist who set the world record for distance ridden in a year
- Walter Greaves (artist) (1846–1930), artist and protégé of Whistler
