= Bruce Bursford =

British racing cyclist (1958–2000)

Bruce Bursford (29 April 1958 – 9 February 2000) was a British sportsman from Dereham, Norfolk who broke the record for the fastest speed on a bicycle on a treadmill at 334.6 km/h in 1995. He designed the bicycles Ultimate and Millennium.

== History ==
Bruce Bursford was a schoolboy cycling champion and claimed nine speed records.

The idea for a bicycle to be made using the advanced materials and techniques usually found in aerospace and Formula 1 came from Bursford himself. In 1995 he achieved 334.6 km/h breaking the record by 88 km/h on a rolling road in the Malcolm Campbell building at Brooklands Museum in Surrey, England. To achieve the speed, conditions were simulated whereby Burford was "towed" until he reached 100 mph (160 km/h). The towline was then "released", and he was left to pedal.

Bursford's speed was attained during a half-minute interval with him reaching 60 mph (97 km/h) in two seconds at the start of the attempt. This feat was achieved on his specially-built bike called the Millennium Cycle. The record-breaking machine used silica tyres filled with helium and ceramic bearings designed to revolve with minimum friction.

Bursford's 'Ultimate' bike won him a Millennium Product Award.

Uri Geller helped him train his mind during record bids.

Bursford died in a collision with a truck while training on the A47 at Easton near his home in Dereham, Norfolk.

== See also ==
- Fastest speed on a bicycle
