= Markus Stöckl =

Austrian cyclist

Personal information
- Nicknames: Hercules, Max
- Born: 1974 (age 51–52) Oberndorf in Tirol, Austria

Cycling career
- Sport: Cycling
- Discipline: Mountain bike racing
- Role: Team director

Markus "Max" Stöckl (born 1974) is an Austrian racing cyclist from Oberndorf in Tirol, mainly occupied with mountainbike racing, who is known for establishing the world speed record descending on a serial production mountainbike, both on snow, when he reached 210 km/h in 2007, and on gravel, when he reached 164.95 km/h in 2011 on a volcano in Nicaragua, beating a previous record from Éric Barone. In 2017 he set a new world record in the Atacama region of Chile with a speed of 167.6 km/h. He weighs 100 kg, stands 1.90 meters tall and his nickname is Hercules. He is currently director of the MS Racing team.

== Biography ==
Markus started cycling in 1992. In 1999 he could not afford an expensive bicycle prototype, so he rode in the series bike class and managed to set a world speed record in that category, descending at 187 km/h at Les Arcs.

On September 14, 2007, at the age of 33, Stöckl rode his Intense M6 mountainbike down the ski slope of La Parva, Chile. The slope is 1.6 kilometers long with a decline of 45 degrees. He reached the speed of 210.4 km/h, 23 km/h faster than his own old record from eight years earlier. The new record was attained on a conventional bicycle with Shimano components, including a Saint crankset and rear derailleur and the new Deore XT disc brakes with 203mm rotors that gave him the controllability and brake power to stop safely after each attempt. A lot of preparations went into the record attempt, but still some difficulties were met. South America's springtime weather had melted away much of the snow alongside the piste, shrinking it to a narrow strip set up between bare mountain cliffs which made the test runs difficult to carry out. His aerodynamic helmet fogged up while practicing, so Stöckl decided to hold his breath during his 40 seconds lasting record attempt.

The top descending speeds have always been obtained on snow. Apart from that, the ashes and gravel of a volcano have been the other surface used. In 2011 Stöckl did break the world speed record descending on gravel, on a serial production bicycle, reaching 164,95 km/h on the Cerro Negro volcano in Nicaragua, beating the previous record of 163 km/h reached by Éric Barone in 2002.

Stöckl has declared that he wishes to break the speed record for prototype bicycles, which is set at 222 km/h on snow, and at 172 km/h on gravel, by Éric Barone.

Beside his activities in high speed mountainbiking Markus Stöckl runs the international operating mountainbike race team "MS-RACING", which he founded together with Lukas Haider in 2003.

== See also ==
- Markus Stöckl's international race program MS-RACING
- Fastest speed on a bicycle
