= Larreynaga =

- Municipality
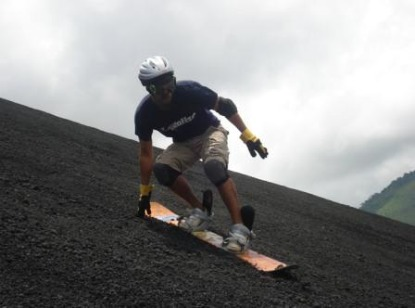
- Sandboarding at the Cerro Negro volcano
- Interactive map of Larreynaga
- Location in Nicaragua Location in Central America
- Coordinates: 12°40′28″N 86°34′15″W
- Country: Nicaragua
- Department: León Department

Area
  - Municipality: 780 km^{2} (300 sq mi)

Population (2022 estimate)
  - Municipality: 33,117
  - Density: 42/km^{2} (110/sq mi)
  - Urban: 14,807
- Time zone: UTC−6 (Central (CST))

Larreynaga (Spanish pronunciation: [laˈrejnaɣa]) is the second largest municipality in the León Department of Nicaragua. The municipality seat is the town of Malpaisillo. The estimated population of the municipality is 33,117 but it is steadily growing at a rate of 2.22% yearly.

== History ==
The municipality of Larreynaga was founded by Colonel Manuel Ignacio Pereira Quintana on August 11, 1944. The town of Malpaisillo was officially declared a city in September 1968. It got its name "Larreynaga" from Miguel Larreynaga, a Nicaraguan philosopher, humanist, lawyer and poet.

The municipality of Larreynaga is home to the Cerro Negro volcano, just 10 km from the city of Malpaisillo. Cerro Negro has erupted frequently since its first eruption. The last volcanic activity at Cerro Negro occurred on August 5, 1999, and lasted for a total of two days.

In recent years, the Cerro Negro volcano has been a popular destination for sandboarding.

== See also ==
- Fauna of Nicaragua
- León, Nicaragua
