= José Meiffret =

French cyclist

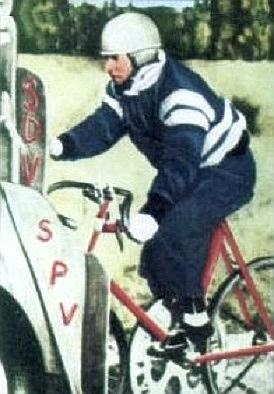
José Meiffret, (1962)

José Meiffret (born Boulouris, France, 27 April 1913; died 16 April 1983) was a cyclist who set a world motor-paced speed record of 204.73 km/h (127.243 mi/h) behind a Mercedes-Benz 300SL on the German Autobahn on 19 July 1962 at Freiburg Germany. This record was set on a bicycle setup with a 130-tooth chainring, weighing 20 kg and equipped with wooden rims.

== See also ==
Cycling records

== Bibliography ==
- Meiffret, José. (1965). Mes Rendez-vous avec la Mort. Flammarion.
