= Ken Webb =

Personal information
- Born: circa 1929 England

Cycling career
- Sport: Cycling
- Current team: Retired
- Discipline: Road - Endurance rider
- Role: Rider
- Rider type: All-rounder

Major wins
- Claimant of 'World Endurance record for a single year'; 80,647 miles (129,789 km) in 1972; Claimant of World record for 100,000 miles (160,000 km) in 448 days throughout 1972-1973

Ken Webb is an English cyclist who at 42 claimed the world record for distance cycled in a year. He calculated that on 7 August 1972 he passed the 75,065 miles (120,805 km) set by another Briton, Tommy Godwin, and that he finished the year with 80,647 miles (129,789 km). He rode on to claim the record for 100,000 miles (160,000 km) in 448 days. Both records appeared in the Guinness Book of Records but were later removed.

== World endurance record for distance cycled in a single year ==
In 1911 the weekly magazine, Cycling began a competition for the greatest distance cycled in a single year. The first holder was Marcel Planes of France, with 34,666 miles (55,790 km). The distance was untouched for more than 20 years. Then followed a succession of claims in the 1930s, including two by an Australian professional, Ossie Nicholson, one by a one-armed vegetarian named Walter Greaves and another by Charles de Gaulle's chauffeur, René Menzies. In 1939 the distance leapt from 65,127 miles (104,812 km) by an Englishman, Bernard Bennett, to 75,065 miles (120,805 km) established by Tommy Godwin. In 2016, under the supervision of the Ultra Marathon Cycling Association (UMCA), Kurt Searvogel (US) broke Tommy Godwin's record by riding 76,076 miles in one year. On 14 May 2017 Amanda Coker broke Searvogel's UMCA and Guinness World record when she finished her year with 86,573.2 miles (139,326.34 km).

Year	Record holder	Country	Distance
1911	Marcel Planes	France	34,666 miles (55,790 km)
1932	Arthur Humbles	Great Britain	36,007 miles (57,948 km)
1933	Ossie Nicholson	Australia	43,966 miles (70,756 km)
1936	Walter Greaves	Great Britain	45,383 miles (73,037 km)
1937	Bernard Bennett	England	45,801 miles (73,710 km)
1937	René Menzies	France	61,561 miles (99,073 km)
1937	Ossie Nicholson	Australia	62,657 miles (100,837 km)
1939	Bernard Bennett	England	65,127 miles (104,812 km)
1939	Tommy Godwin	England	75,065 miles (120,805 km)
2017	Amanda Coker	United States	86,573.2 miles (139,326.34 km)

== The ride ==
Ken Webb, from Gossops Green, Sussex, intended to attempt the record when he retired after a working life that included 12 years with the Fleet Air Arm. Unemployment as a project engineer at 42 advanced his plans. He set off from Fleet Street, London, then the heart of the British newspaper industry, at noon on 1 September 1971.

Webb had little support from sponsors. By 10 November he had run out of money and took a job at Gatwick Airport, near his home. He spoke of working there, riding 220 miles (350 km) a day after work and sleeping two or three hours a night. He averaged better than 223 miles (359 km) a day, sent witnessed postcards to Cycling's office to log his progress and used a different odometer each month to support the distance shown on the cards.

Webb rode one day with Keith Bingham, a reporter from Cycling. Bingham quoted Webb as saying: "People ask how it is that I account for a greater mileage between places than the road signs indicate. I tell them that I don't always ride straight from one place to the other, that sometimes I make detours - as you've seen this morning, Keith, when we went a few miles out of our way looking for the right road to Maldon. And what they don't seem to realise either is that when I arrive anywhere I might not seek anyone to sign a card until I've refreshed myself in a café, which is sometimes 30 minutes after stopping."

He finished the year record £134 in debt after cashing his life insurance policies, using his redundancy payments and using his pension fund. He completed his 100,000-mile (160,000 km) ride outside Buckingham Palace after 448 days. He knew throughout his ride that he had doubters. He was followed at times by cyclists checking his riding and Cycling received calls asking what he had claimed. His distances appeared in the Guinness Book of Records but vanished from later editions.

== After the ride ==
Webb insisted that he had ridden the distance, that he sent thousands of check cards to Cycling, and that his 13 odometers had been sealed by their maker and returned for checking. He said he wrote to the editor of the Guinness Book of Records to ask why his name had been deleted but that he got no reply. He said:

Around the Stoke-on-Trent area, with Tommy Godwin's friends, there was a lot of ill-feeling that he [Godwin] had lost his record. And there was talk going around that I was on drugs, that when I went to bed for a few hours, someone else was clocking up the miles. I was warned by Tommy Godwin and René Menzies that people did this in their day. They would actually spend a week going round following me. (Ken Webb, 1992.)
