= Albert Arthur Humbles =

English cyclist

Albert Arthur Humbles (9 May 1910 – 3 July 1997), subsequently known as Alan Alain Holt and Allan Holt, was an English cyclist who set the world endurance cycling record by covering 36,007 miles (57,948 kilometres) during the calendar year of 1932. He broke the previous best mark that had stood since Marcel Planes completed 34,366 mi (55,307 km) in 1911 in response to Cycling magazine's 'Century Competition'. In 1933, Humbles entered the Golden Book of Cycling as the greatest long-distance rider in the world. He rode 36,007 mi (57,948 km) in a year, averaging 100.019 mi (160.965 km) per day for the 360 days that he rode.

== Early life ==
Humbles was born in Dalston, London, the sixth of seven children of William Humbles (1881-1917) and Blanche Maude Amelia Humbles (née Illett; 1884-1974). By 1914, his parents had separated and he was admitted to the Hackney Union Children’s Home in Homerton, London as a pauper. His father served in the London Regiment of the British Army in the First World War and was killed in action in France on 9 April 1917. Humbles lived in Almorah Road in Hoxton, Islington, North London, during the time of his record bid.

== World endurance record ==
In 1911 the weekly magazine Cycling began a competition for the highest number of 100 mi (160 km) rides or "centuries" in a single year. The winner was Marcel Planes with 332 centuries in which he covered 34,366 miles (55,307 km). The inspiration for the competition was said to be the efforts of Harry Long, a commercial traveller who rode a bicycle on his rounds covering every part of England and Scotland and who covered 25,376 miles (40,839 km) in 1910. The world record for distance cycled in a year began in an era when bicycle companies competed to show their machines were the most reliable. The record has been officially established nine times. A tenth claim, by the English rider Ken Webb, was later disallowed. (Note: Ken Webb's claim was for 80,647 miles (129,789 km) in 1972. Webb insisted he had completed the distance but others said he hadn't and he was removed from the Guinness Book of Records.)

World Endurance record for a single year
Year	Record holder	Country	Distance	Ref
1911	Marcel Planes	France	34,366 miles (55,307 km)	
1932	Albert Arthur Humbles	Great Britain	36,007 miles (57,948 km)	
1933	Ossie Nicholson	Australia	43,966 miles (70,756 km)	
1936	Walter Greaves	Great Britain	45,383 miles (73,037 km)	
1937	Bernard Bennett	Great Britain	45,801 miles (73,710 km)	
1937	René Menzies	France	61,561 miles (99,073 km)	
1937	Ossie Nicholson	Australia	62,657 miles (100,837 km)	
1939	Bernard Bennett	Great Britain	65,127 miles (104,812 km)	
1939	Tommy Godwin	Great Britain	75,065 miles (120,805 km)	

Humbles was a member of the Ingleside Cycling Club. Having been made unemployed as a blend-mixer at a tobacco factory, Humbles wanted to demonstrate that an ordinary clubman could break the long-standing world endurance record, so in 1932 cycling became a full-time occupation.

In January 1932, he wrote to Birmingham-based cycle firm, Hercules, who agreed to give him an ordinary Hercules Empire Club racing bike from stock and eventually agreed to pay him £6 per week plus expenses to attempt the world record, whilst demonstrating the ease of cycling and the reliability of the British bicycle.

He set out to cycle 36,500 miles in a year using a fixed gear and later changed to a variable gear. He suffered only four punctures and required only two new Dunlop tyres and wore out two chains during the world record attempt. At 18,000 miles, all the bearings in the bike were changed ("not because it was necessary, but just in case") as were the brake blocks.

His daily average was 100.019 mi (160.965 km) per day for the 360 days that he rode. His longest ride in a single day was 178 mi (286 km) from Leeds to Biggleswade via Sheffield and Grantham which took from 9am until 10.30pm. The shortest daily ride was 35 mi (56 km). Riding at an ordinary touring pace, his average speed whilst cycling was 16 miles per hour. Having initially set off on 8 January 1932 from Marble Arch, his usual routes were out of London along the Great North Road, the Cambridge Road and the Newmarket Road. Among the hillier areas he visited were the Lake District, North Wales, North Devon and Somerset, including Porlock. He also ventured to Brighton, Cambridge and Newbury. He also visited Yorkshire, which he described as his preferred county. He eventually toured almost every county in Great Britain, visiting places such as Alnwick, Clovelly, Bury St. Edmunds and Bere Regis.

By 16 April 1932, he had completed 10,000 miles, when he was bade farewell by the members of parliament for the four Islington constituencies at the House of Commons.

On 2 July 1932, he was photographed being greeted by members of the Gloucester Cycling Club on arrival in Gloucester.

By 5 August 1932, he had visited the coastal resorts of Brighton, Worthing, Hastings, Margate, Ramsgate, Southend and Clacton, signing autographs for holiday makers he met there.

By 2 September 1932, it was reported that Humbles considered himself sufficiently ahead of schedule, that he was aiming to reach 40,000 miles by the end of the year.

On 1 October 1932, he was photographed shaking hands with Mr C. Boughton, described as the "London Champion" who was mounted on a penny-farthing as Humbles was greeted by a group of about 200 cyclists from local cycling clubs on his arrival from Brighton for a planned reception at Purley Station. By this stage, he had already cycled 27,600 miles. He was subsequently escorted by a private procession of about 200 cyclists to Kennards stores at North End, Croydon to meet with interested cyclists to discuss his record attempt. He was congratulated by the store manager, Mr Harding, on the progress of his record-breaking attempt, as well as by Olympic cycling champion, Frank Southall.

By 7 November 1932, he had completed 31,400 miles averaging 103 miles per day at that stage, with an average speed of about 16 miles per hour.

By the evening of Saturday, 10 December 1932, he had equalled Planes’ 1911 record of 34,366 miles.

On 11 December 1932, he set off from Buckingham Palace and broke Marcel Planes' record by riding the 34,367th mile on the 338th day through Hyde Park, London, reportedly followed from Constitution Hill amongst a packed mass over half a mile long by between 3,000 and 5,000 cyclists of both sexes, including about 150 members of his own cycling club, amid prolonged cheers and the continuous ringing of 3,000 cycle bells. At Marble Arch, he was presented with a silver cup and a large laurel wreath by Sir Malcolm Campbell, who described the feat as a remarkable triumph for the English cycle manufacturing industry and reportedly said he had rarely seen a healthier looking man. Humbles’ eight year old niece, Yvonne May Ball (née Bourn; 1924–84) presented him with a small laurel wreath. After the ceremony at Marble Arch, he was escorted by a large group of cyclists, to the recently constructed Dorchester Hotel, Park Lane, London, where a reception was held in his honour, which was attended by Marcel Planes. After the reception, hoping to complete 36,000 miles by the end of the year, he set out for Epping in order to complete a further 100 miles that day.

He only took a day off once every month and even planned to continue cycling on Christmas Day and Boxing Day. He stopped at roadside inns for his meals, gaining an inch in height and a stone in weight during the course of his record attempt.

On 31 December 1932, he was photographed ending his world cycling endurance record riding through a paper clock at the New Year's Eve Reunion Carnival Dance of the National Cyclists' Union at the Royal Horticultural Hall in Westminster, London. He was presented with a silver cigarette case as a gift from the London centre of the National Cyclists’ Union. By this time he had ridden 36,007 miles in 359 days.

== The Golden Book ==
Humbles' achievements were celebrated in 1933 when Cycling Weekly awarded him his own page in the Golden Book of Cycling.

== Later life and death ==
By 1936, he was living in Stoke Newington, London. On 26 January 1936 at Stoke Newington Registry Office he married Zota Epp Mae Scarr (née McCartney, later Ribalta) (born 19 January 1919 in Hackney, London; died 30 January 2000 in Wandsworth, London). Their daughter, Sylvia June Humbles was born on 3 October 1937 at the Elizabeth Garrett Anderson Hospital in St Pancras, London, and was later adopted by her maternal grandparents. Between 1937 and 1939, Humbles was employed fitting bicycle frames whilst living in Canonbury.

By 1942, Humbles was living in Balham, London and still working as a cycle frame fitter. On 30 July 1942 at South Western Police Court in Balham, Humbles admitted stealing a racing bicycle worth £10 belonging to his employers, Claud Butler of Clapham High Street and also stealing tools worth £15 belonging to his employer. Humbles served in the 56th London Battalion of the Home Guard between August and November 1942. He also enlisted in the Territorial Army on 1 October 1942, spending time in the Fulwood Wing of the Military Hospital in Preston, Lancashire between March and April 1943, followed by a posting to North Africa between 15 May 1943 and 9 August 1946. He was demobilized on 12 November 1946, but remained a Class Z Reservist until 10 February 1954. He was fully discharged as a reservist upon reaching the age of 45 on 9 May 1954.

Already living apart by 1946, his marriage to Zota Scarr had ended in divorce before October 1952. On 17 Jun 1949, he changed his name by deed poll to Alan Alain Holt. By 1950, he was living in High Wycombe, Buckinghamshire, working as a painter and decorator. On 13 March 1954 at High Wycombe Register Office, he married divorcée Pamela Margaret Warren (née Sutton, later Naish) (born 19 July 1926, died 17 October 1978). By 1956 they were living apart and their marriage had ended in divorce by 1973. He continued living in High Wycombe until at least 1966. By 1977, he was living in Wood Green, London with his eldest brother, William Henry James Humbles (1903-1977). He died on 3 July 1997 in Tottenham Hale, London. His estate is included in the list of unclaimed estates maintained by the Treasury Solicitor as bona vacantia.
