= Billie Samuel =

Australian cyclist (1907–1995)

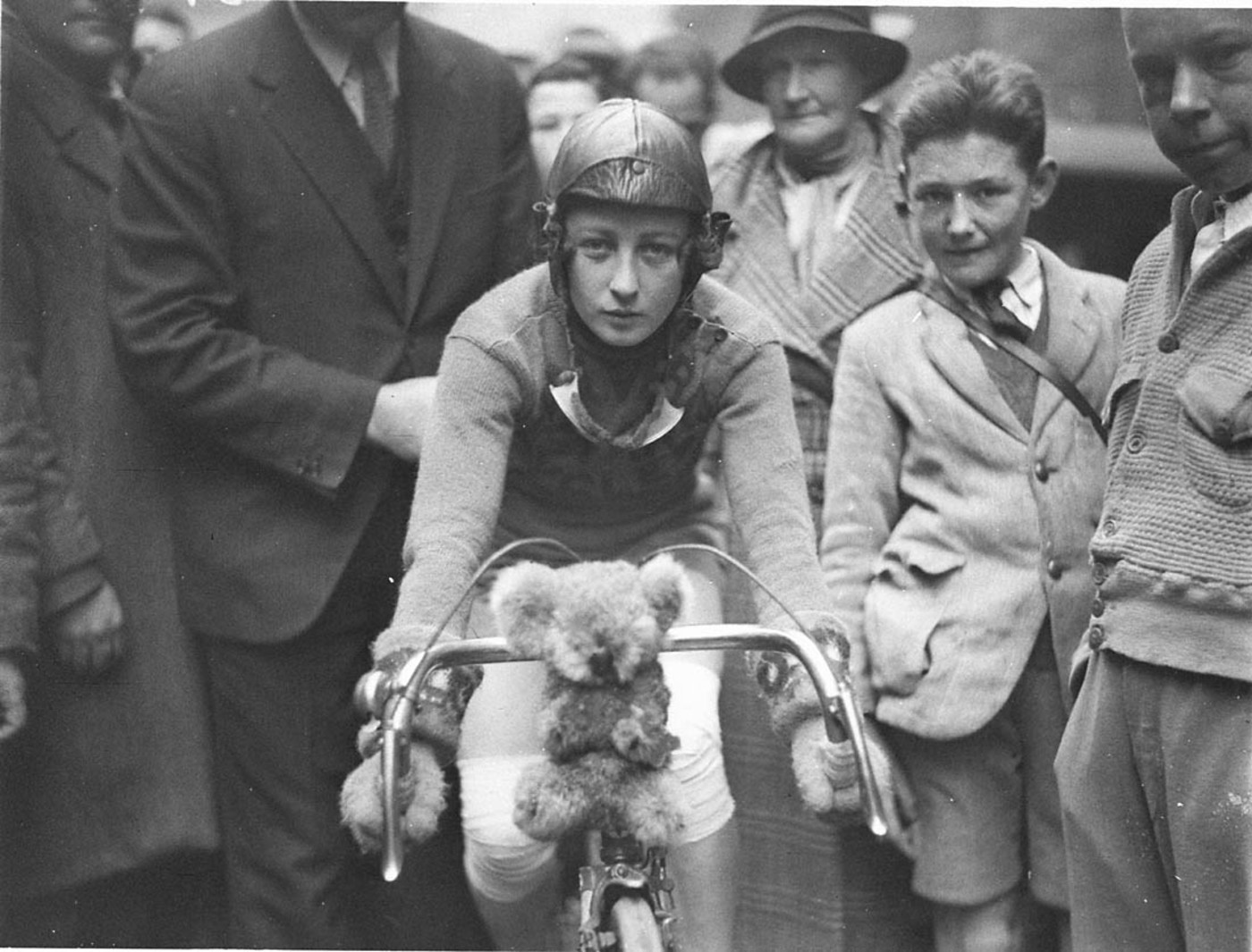
- Born: 24 March 1907; Denver, Colorado, U.S.
- Died: 15 January 1995 (aged 87); Bendigo, Victoria, Australia
- Occupations: Cyclist, waitress

Zara Kathleen Samuel (later Kesper; 24 March 1907 – 15 January 1995), better known as Billie Samuel, was an American-born Australian cyclist. In 1934, she became the first woman to cycle from Melbourne to Sydney. On her return journey, she broke the women's world record for the fastest ride from Sydney to Melbourne, previously held by Elsa Barbour.

== Biography ==
Zara Kathleen Samuel was born in Denver, Colorado, United States on 24 March 1907. Nicknamed "Billie", she was the daughter of Richard Martin Samuel, a Sydney musician, and Rae Samuel (née Walker). She was working as a waitress and had only been cycling for a few months when she decided to ride from Melbourne to Sydney, a 575-mile trip, in an attempt to beat the women's world record for that distance. The record at the time was held by Elsa Barbour for her 1932 ride from Sydney to Melbourne.

Samuel was trained by controversial Australian endurance cyclist Ossie Nicholson who had been banned for allegedly interfering with another record attempt. His ban was lifted eventually after Samuel completed her ride from Melbourne to Sydney in May 1934. It took her 3 days, 17 hours, and 2 minutes, which was not fast enough to beat Barbour's record of 3 days, 7 hours, and 32 minutes. Samuel crashed twice on her ride and faced inclement weather.

On 4 July 1934 Samuel left Sydney to ride back to Melbourne, attempting again to beat Barbour's record. This time, the weather was fair, and Samuel succeeded in setting the new world record of 3 days, 1 hour, and 20 minutes. Samuel weighed 91 lbs. at the time, making her the lightest woman champion, a record she held until at least 1971.

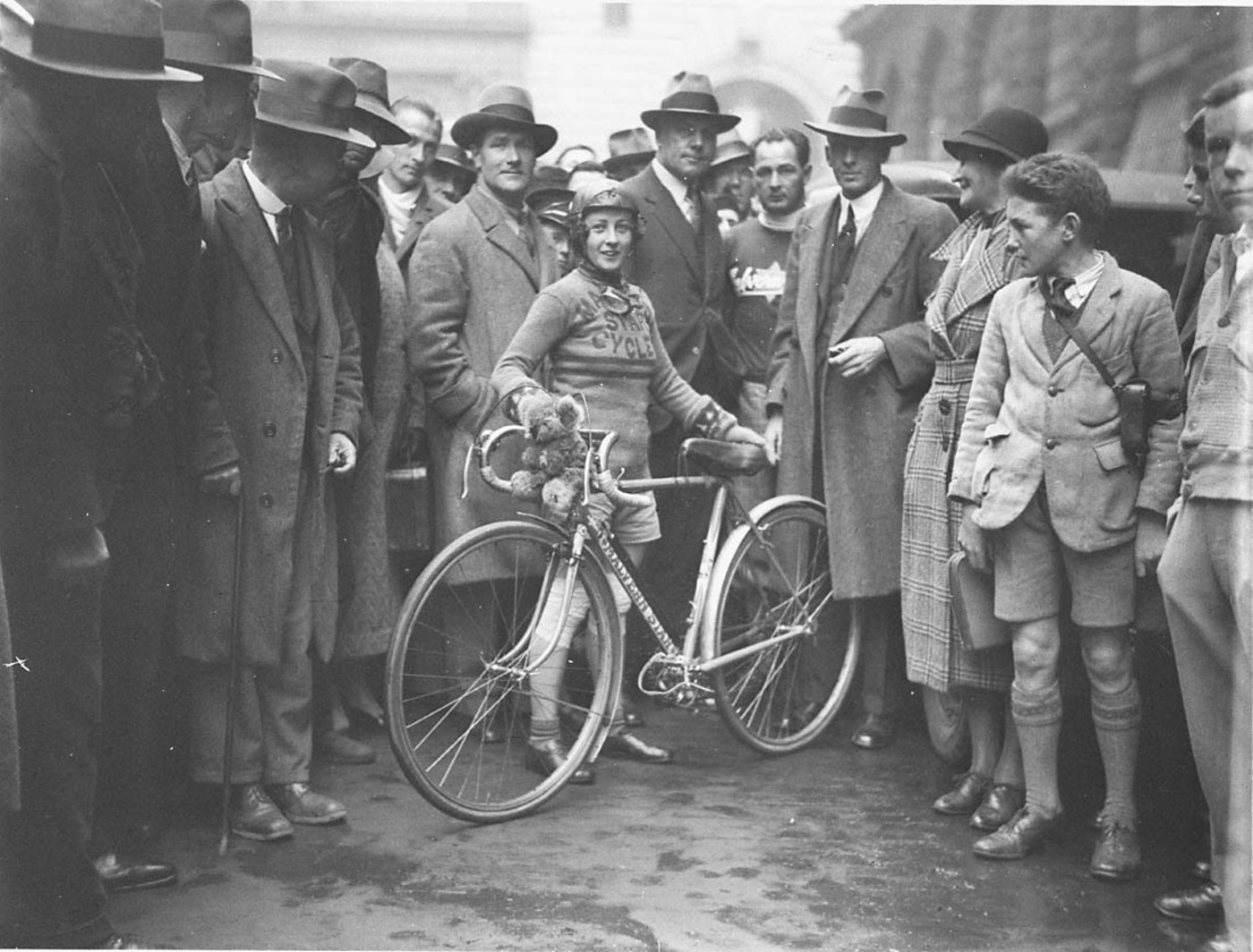
Billie Samuel leaving to ride to Melbourne on a Malvern Star bicycle, 4 July 1934, by Sam Hood.

After returning to Melbourne, Samuel announced that she also wanted to beat Elsa Barbour's world record for the fastest ride between Melbourne and Adelaide.

Samuel's Sydney-to-Melbourne record was beaten in 1937 by Joyce Barry.

When she was 30, Samuel married Karl Gustav Kesper, who predeceased her. Billie Samuel died from pancreatic cancer and bronchopneumonia in Bendigo, Victoria, on 15 January 1995, at the age of 87.
