= Southern Masters Cycling Club =

Australian cycling club

The Southern Masters Cycling Club in Melbourne, Australia is a bicycle road racing club for masters riders. Cyclists become eligible for membership at the age of 30 for males, and 30 years for females. The club is the largest Masters cycling club in Australia. In 2006, there are over 350 members.

== History ==
The club's first official meeting was held on 23 March 1975. In the late seventies the Southern Veterans Cycling Club formed the Veteran Cycling Association of Victoria, which later became the Victorian Veterans Cycling Council (VVCC).

The club changed its affiliation from the VVCC to Cycling Australia, which is affiliated to the Union Cycliste Internationale (UCI), at a special general meeting held on 29 September 2008.

The club subsequently changed its name from Southern Veterans Cycling Club to Southern Masters Cycling Club.

== Racing locations and details ==
The types of races the club provides are:

- Open road race, also referred to as a graded scratch race
- Criterium, often abbreviated to crit
- Handicap, where riders are given time handicaps in groups
- Club Championships, were riders are grouped according to their age (35–39, 40–44, 45–49 etc.)

Racing is conducted all year round.

In winter, racing is based around the Mornington Peninsula and West Gippsland from April to September. These races are held on public roads for which all necessary permits are obtained. Distances vary depending on the course but are generally in the range 50–80 km.

The summer season, from October to March, is criterium races, which usually last from 1 to 2 hours.

The club caters for a wide range in age and ability of competing riders with grades A to G. Riders are only grouped according to their age championship races which are held twice a year (for both the criterium and road seasons) at club, state and national level.

== See also ==
- Masters cycling
