= Billie Fleming =

British cyclist (1914-2014)

- Fleming racing a racing trike in 1940

Personal information
- Nickname: Billie Dovey
- Born: Lilian Irene Bartram; 13 April 1914 Camden, north London, England
- Died: 12 May 2014 (aged 100) Bideford, Devon, England

Cycling career
- Sport: Cycling
- Discipline: Road
- Role: Rider

Amateur team

Lilian Irene Bartram known as Billie Fleming and Billie Dovey (13 April 1914 – 12 May 2014), was a long-distance cyclist who set the woman's record for greatest distance cycled in a year in 1938 at 29,603.7 miles (47,642.5 km). At the time of her death in 2014, she continued to receive letters from people saying how much she inspired them to cycle; her record still stood until 2015.

== Cycling record ==
She had taken up cycling around the age of 18 and, following the ideas of the Women's League of Health and Beauty, she rode across the United Kingdom on a mission to promote the health benefits of cycling. She gained sponsorship from Rudge-Whitworth to provide a bicycle and financial support so that she could ride every day of the year in a wide variety of weather conditions. She was also sponsored by Cadbury chocolate. She was self-reliant on her journeys, cycling alone and calling in at cafes to eat. She did not carry any water. The distances were authenticated through a cyclometer on the bicycle and cycling check cards signed by witnesses that she submitted to the Cycling Magazine (now Cycling Weekly) offices.

Her cycling record bid started on 1 January 1938 from Mill Hill in London. The summer weather was good, but December 1938 was snowy. The distance she travelled each day averaged 81 miles (130 km), but was up to 196 miles (315 km) in summer. Her mammoth tour included many evening engagements requiring her to give a talk at the end of a long day's pedalling. Fleming's ride attracted a huge amount of interest and press attention as the year progressed. Her record attempt finished with a reception at the Agricultural/Horticultural Hall in London that included cycling journalists and Mr England.

Her mileage set a women's record and attracted international attention. Her subsequent plan to cycle across the USA had to be called off because of the Second World War. She also later met René Menzies and Tommy Godwin, who successively held the men's record for greatest distance cycled in a year, among other achievements.

In 1940 she broke three records riding a tricycle — the 25-, 50-, and 100-mile distances.

== Personal life ==
She was born Lilian Irene Bartram on 13 April 1914 in Camden, north London. Her father was a toolmaker. She attended the Lyulph Stanley Central School, Camden and left aged 16 to become a typist and secretary. During the Second World War she worked in the buying office of an aircraft company.

Her first marriage to Freddie Dovey ended in divorce, with one son. She subsequently married George Fleming (d. 1997) after the Second World War, a cyclist with a huge racing pedigree who had a number of cycling records. They had a stepson from his previous relationship. In later life she lived in Devon. She died at the age of 100 years on 12 May 2014 after a short illness.

== Legacy and similar record attempts by other women ==
In 1942 Pat Hawkins set out to take the record from Fleming but her total mileage of 54,402.8 miles was disallowed after a review of her log books by the Australian cycling authorities.

The Billie Fleming Tribute Cycle Ride in 2015 aimed to recreate Fleming's ride over 2015, with different women riders each day. By the end of the year 400 riders had covered 107,000 miles.

Kajsa Tylen was inspired by Fleming, and started to cycle on New Year's Day 2016, aiming to cover 36,000 miles (58,000 km) at 100 miles (160 km) per day. She said that she wanted to motivate people to exercise rather than raise money for charity. Tylen broke Fleming's record.

American Amanda Coker began a certified attempt to surpass Fleming's record on 15 May 2016. On 21 September 2016, after only 130 days into her attempt, Coker passed Fleming's record. Coker then went on to set the Guinness overall record (male or female) on 15 May 2017 when she finished with 86,573.2 miles (139,326.34 km).
