= Cycling Victoria =

Australian cycling organisation

- Sport: Cycling
- Jurisdiction: Victoria (Australia)
- Abbreviation: CV
- Founded: 1893
- Affiliation: Cycling Australia
- Headquarters: Thornbury, Victoria
- President: David Gallagher
- CEO: Craig Eastwood

Official website
- www.cycling.org.au/vic

Cycling Victoria (CV) is the peak governing body for organised competitive and recreational cycling within Victoria, Australia. CV is an affiliate of Cycling Australia (CA) and the UCI (International Cycling Union) and currently has 65 affiliated clubs and over 6,000 members throughout Victoria.

== History ==
Cycling Victoria can trace its history back to pre-federation Australia. The League of Victorian Wheelman (LVW) was first founded in 1893 as a professional cycling body. The Victorian Amateur Cyclists' Union (VACU) was founded in May 1917 to promote the interests of amateur cyclists in Victoria. The VACU would change in name to the Victorian Cycling Federation (VCF) in 1986. The VCF and the LVW merged in 1986 to become Victorian Cycling Incorporated, which was changed to CycleSport Victoria in the 1990s. In 2011 CycleSport Victoria became Cycling Victoria.

== Affiliated clubs ==
Name	Location
Albury Wodonga Cycling Club	Albury/Wodonga
Alpine Cycling Club	Bright
Ararat & District Cycling Club	Ararat
Bairnsdale Cycling Club	Bairnsdale
Ballarat & Sebastopol Cycling Club	Ballarat
Bayside Banditos Cycling Club	Parkdale
Bendigo & District Cycling Club	Bendigo
Blackburn Cycling Club	Blackburn
Brunswick Cycling Club	Brunswick
Camperdown Cycling Club	Camperdown
Carnegie Caulfield Cycling Club	Caulfield
Casey-Cardinia HPV & Cycling Club	Cranbourne East
Castlemaine Cycling Club	Castlemaine
Cobram Cycling Club	Cobram
Coburg Cycling Club	Coburg
Colac Cycling Club	Colac
Dirt Riders MTB Club	Beaconsfield Upper
Echuca-Moama Cycling Club	Echuca
Footscray Cycling Club	Footscray
Geelong Cycling Club	Geelong
Hamilton Cycling Club	Hamilton
Hawthorn Cycling Club	Hamilton
Horsham Cycling Club	Horsham
Italo Australia Cycling Club	Carlton
La Trobe City Cycling Club	Newborough
Lavington Panthers Cycling Club	Albury
Leongatha Cycling Club	Leongatha
Maccabi Cycling Club	Toorak
Macedon Ranges Cycling Club	Macedon
Mansfield Mt Buller Cycling Club	Mansfield
The University of Melbourne Cycling Club	Parkville
Melbourne Cycling League	Melbourne
Melton Cycling Club	Melton
Mitchell BUG	Kilmore
Mornington Cycling Club	Mornington
Northcote Cycling Club	Northcote
Port Fairy Cycling Club	Port Fairy
Portland Cycling Club	Portland
Preston Cycling Club	Preston
Seymour Broadford Cycling Club	Seymour
Shepparton Cycling Club	Shepparton
Southern Masters Cycling Club	Cranbourne
St Kilda Cycling Club	St Kilda
Stawell-Great Western Cycling Club	Stawell
Sunbury Cycling Club	Sunbury
Wangaratta Cycling Club	Wangaratta
Warragul Cycling Club	Warragul
Warrnambool Cycling Club	Warrnambool
Wellington Cycling Club	Sale
Whittlesea Cycling Club	Whittlesea
