= Class Z Reserve =

Reserve contingent of the British Army

The Class Z Reserve was a Reserve contingent of the British Army consisting of previously enlisted soldiers, now discharged.

The first Z Reserve was authorised by an Army Order of 3 December 1918. When expected problems with violations of the Armistice with Germany did not eventuate, the Z Reserve was abolished on 31 March 1920.

Following the Second World War, a new Z Reserve of soldiers and officers who had served between 3 September 1939 and 31 December 1948 were available for recall if under 45 years of age.
