= Amanda Coker =

American cyclist (born 1992)

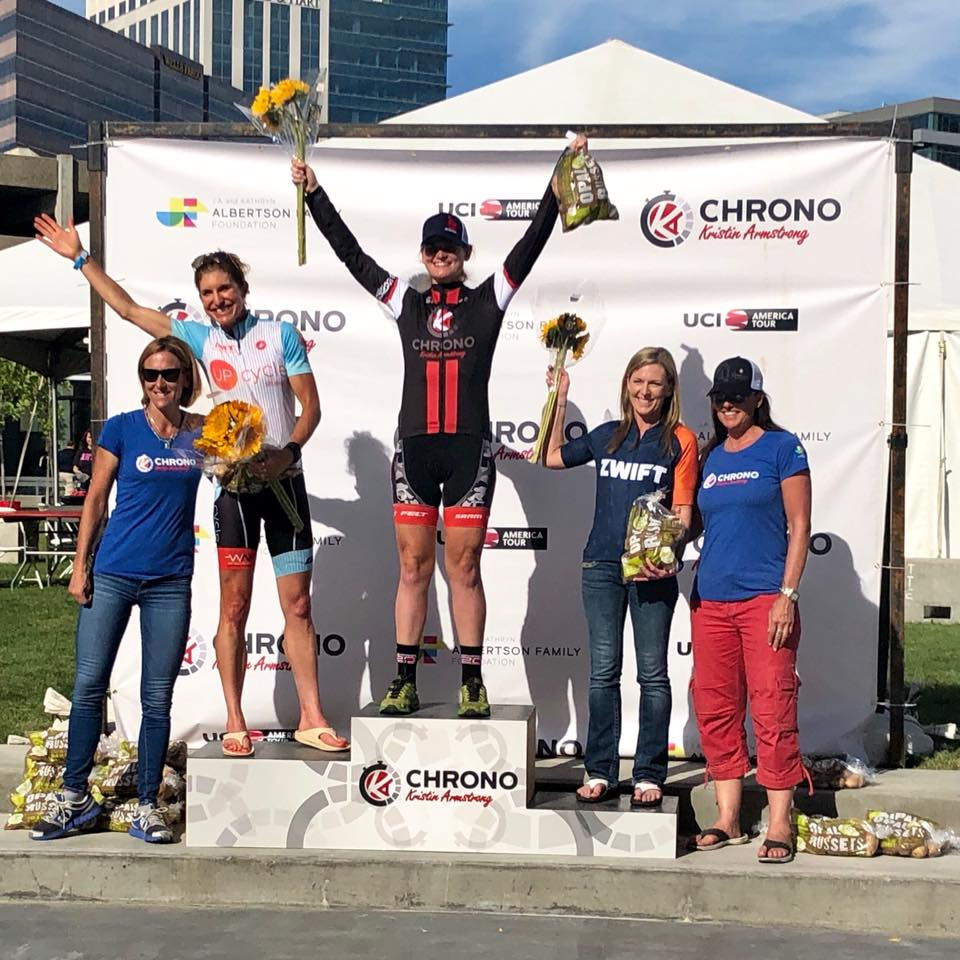

Personal information
- Born: 1992 (age 33–34) North Carolina

Cycling career
- Sport: Cycling
- Current team: Team Twenty20 UCI Women's Professional/Development Team
- Discipline: Road Racing
- Rider type: Time Trial

Major wins
- WUCA and Guinness Book records for greatest distance cycled in a year, fastest person to cycle 100,000 miles, greatest distance cycled in a month, and first woman in history to exceed 500 miles in 24 hours.

Amanda Coker (born 1992, in North Carolina) is an American ultra-cyclist and the current record holder of the World Endurance record for distance in a calendar year.

== Career ==
Coker first began riding alongside her father, Ricky, as a teenager, and found success as a racer, placing sixth in the time trial at the junior national championships in 2010. She later enrolled at Fort Lewis College in Durango, Colorado as part of a collegiate cycling programs.

In 2011 Coker was hit by a distracted motorist. The crash threw her 50 feet (15 m) and knocked her unconscious, leaving her with brain and spinal injuries. After recovering, she resumed cycling in 2015.

On 15 May 2016 Coker began an attempt to set a new record for distance covered over the course of a year. Riding a course in Flatwoods Park in Tampa Bay she rode 237.19 mi (382 km) a day on average. After 130 days of riding she had covered 29,774 mi (47,917 km), beating Billie Fleming's female record of 29,603.7 mi (47,643 km) which had stood since 1938. In April 2017 she surpassed the previous overall record of 76,076 mi (122,432 km) set by Kurt Searvogel. In May 2017 she completed the year, setting a new record of 86,573 miles (139,326 km), beating the previous record by over 10,000 miles (16,093 km). During the attempt, her longest ride in a single day was 302 mi (486 km), completed on the penultimate day.

After setting the new record, Coker continued cycling, seeking to break the record for the shortest time to cover 100,000 mi (160,934 km). For 77 years that record was held by Tommy Godwin, who set off in January 1939 and reached the 100,000 mi (160,934 km) mark in May 1940, after 500 days of cycling. On July 11, 2017, Coker reached 100,000 mi (160,934 km), after 423 days of cycling.

On October 23, 2021, Coker set a new road record of 512.506 miles (824.8 km) in 24 hours, and became the first woman to break 500 miles (800 km) in 24 hours riding solo. During the record attempt, she also broke 10 other WUCA/Guinness World records for other various durations and distances.
