= Kajsa Tylen =

Cyclist

Personal information
- Born: Sweden

Cycling career
- Sport: Cycling
- Role: Rider

Kajsa Tylen is a Swedish cyclist.

On December 31, 2016, the Sweden-born cyclist living in Nottingham beat the 78-year-old standing Guinness World Record for the number of miles cycled in one year by a woman. The distance completed was 52,025.09 km (32,326 miles).

The highest position prior to that was gained by Billie Fleming in 1938. She cycled 29,604 miles (47,642 km) on 24 November, but continued cycling until the end of the year.

Tylen cycled an average of 14,253 kilometres (8,856 mi) per day between New Year's Day and New Year's Eve, 2016.

She was also voted 2016 Total Women's Cycling Awards Unsung Hero.
