= René Menzies =

French cyclist

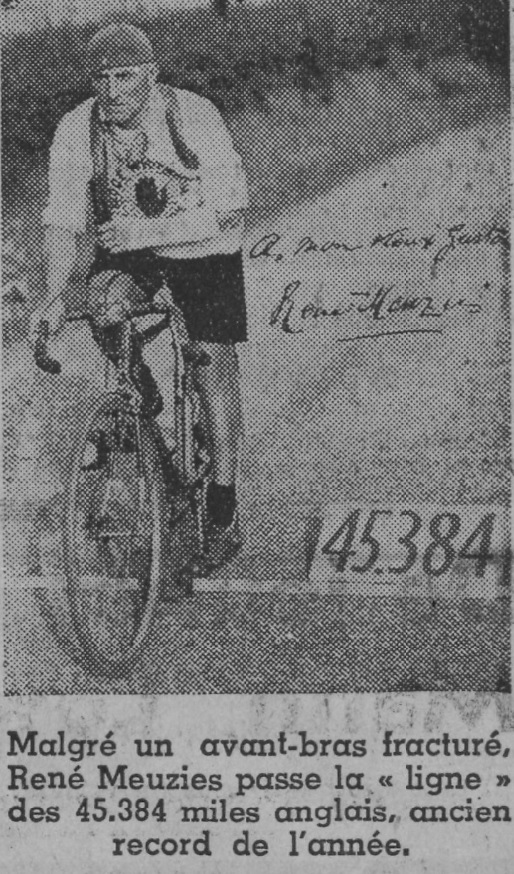

Personal information
- Born: c. November 1889 French
- Died: c. 1959, aged 69

Cycling career
- Sport: Cycling
- Discipline: Road
- Role: Rider
- Rider type: Endurance

Major wins
- World Endurance record for a single year: 61,561 miles (99,073 km) in 1937; World record for 100,000 miles (160,000 km): achieved in 532 days in 1937-8; World Veteran Endurance record for single year: 62,785 miles (101,043 km) in 1952

René Menzies (c. November 1889 – 1959) was a French long-distance cyclist who at 48 held a record for the greatest distance ridden on a bicycle in a year. He rode 99,073 kilometres (61,561 mi) in 1937. He was decorated with the Croix de Guerre in the First World War and was chauffeur to the French leader, Charles de Gaulle in the second world war. After the war he tried to ride 63,000 miles (101,000 km) in a year to celebrate his 63rd birthday but finished with 62,785 miles (101,043 km).

== Background ==
René Menzies was born in Caen, France, of French and Scottish descent. He moved to England in the early 1930s. His talent for long distances was well known, and it eventually led him to try for the record for the greatest distance in a year.

== World endurance record for distance cycled in a single year ==
In 1911, the weekly magazine Cycling began a competition for the highest number of 100-mile (160 km) rides or "centuries" in a single year. The winner was Marcel Planes with 332 centuries in which he covered 34,366 miles (55,307 km). The inspiration for the competition was said to be the efforts of Harry Long, a commercial traveller who rode a bicycle on his rounds covering every part of England and Scotland and who covered 25,376 miles (40,839 km) in 1910. The record has been officially established nine times. A tenth claim, by the English rider Ken Webb, was later disallowed. (Note: Ken Webb's claim was for 80,647 miles (129,789 km) in 1972. Webb insisted he had completed the distance but others said he hadn't and he was removed from the Guinness Book of Records.)

World Endurance record for a single year
Year	Record holder	Country	Distance	Ref
1911	Marcel Planes	France	34,366 miles (55,307 km)	
1932	Arthur Humbles	Great Britain	36,007 miles (57,948 km)	
1933	Ossie Nicholson	Australia	43,966 miles (70,756 km)	
1936	Walter Greaves	Great Britain	45,383 miles (73,037 km)	
1937	Bernard Bennett	Great Britain	45,801 miles (73,710 km)	
1937	René Menzies	France	61,561 miles (99,073 km)	
1937	Ossie Nicholson	Australia	62,657 miles (100,837 km)	
1939	Bernard Bennett	Great Britain	65,127 miles (104,812 km)	
1939	Tommy Godwin	Great Britain	75,065 miles (120,805 km)	

In that era bicycle companies competed to show their machines were the most reliable. Menzies was sponsored by a British manufacturer, Rudge-Whitworth. Menzies' ambition was to break not only the record for the year but another, for 100,000 miles (160,000 km), which he achieved in 532 days.

The year record was held by an Australian professional, Ossie Nicholson. It was established in 1933 and broken in 1936 by a one-armed English amateur, Walter Greaves. Nicholson said he would set it again. He had competition, however, from Bernard Bennett, another British rider, and from Menzies. All three men were trying for the record at the same time.

Nicholson started more than 10 kg overweight but rode 300 km a day. He had ridden 40,000 km by the end of May but Menzies had started to close the gap. Menzies, in the European winter, had fallen on icy roads, broken a bone and missed 24 days. The writer Jock Wadley recalled:

That first day of January 1937, soaked to the skin, he came running excitedly to the office about teatime with the news: 'One hundred and feefty miles.' It was the first day of a year's ride; 364 days later he had ridden 61,561 miles (99,073 km) and had shown the real meaning of the French word courage by riding for weeks with a broken wrist in plaster and sling.

Winter arrived in Australia as summer came to Europe. Nicholson often rode in the dark to keep up his distance but Menzies had daylight and the two men were level by the start of October. They both beat Greaves' record on the same day.

Menzies reached Greaves' record at Alexandra Palace in London, with Greaves beside him.

Cycling reported:

A year's race had commenced between two widely separated contestants, Ossie Nicholson from Down Under who had already tasted success, and a newcomer, René Menzies, a 48-year-old Frenchman of Scottish descent. René rode in the UK and on the Continent, searching for the hotter weather... Many miles away, Nicholson had found better weather and financial support; at the end of his year he had collected an amazing 62,567 miles [100,692 km] this time tasting more than glory as he had also pedalled his way clear of beating the 100,000-mile [160,000 km] record, this time in 532 days.

Each of the three riders beat Greaves' mark with Bennett riding 45,801 miles (73,710 km) and Menzies riding 61,561 miles (99,073 km). Nicholson regained the record with 62,657 miles (100,837 km)

Dorothy Curtis, writing in the magazine of the National Cycle Collection in Britain, said Menzies lived in London and sometimes rode 100 miles (200 km) from there to Brighton and back in the morning and then to a café that her mother owned near the Bidlake memorial at Girtford Bridge near Sandy, Bedfordshire, north of London, in the afternoon before returning to London. She said:

He asked my mother if he could put a hut up in the garden with a single bed and a chair so that is he did a night ride he could pop in there and not disturb anybody. Of course we had to sign papers that he had done the miles and also feed him. Sometimes he used to be a bit downhearted so we girls used to buck him up or cheer him on. We used to say 'Now come on, you know all after this looking after you we're expecting a nice prize at the end. I shan't get that free Rudge-Whitworth bike if you don't keep on with your ride.' (Note: Menzies remembered the help he had been given and Dorothy Curtis was sent a five-speed Rudge-Whitworth.)

At the end of the year, Nicholson is reported to have said "Will you cable Rene Menzies, and tell him I want to be numbered among his greatest admirers. That tough little Frenchman made me ride every mile, and nobody can appreciate his pluck and pedalling ability, and his capacity to take punishment better than I can."

== Veteran ride ==
War stopped Menzies from trying to beat Nicholson. The Australian's distance had in any case been improved to 120,805 kilometres (75,065 mi) by a British rider, Tommy Godwin, in 1939, a distance that still stands. (Note: A better distance, 129,789 km (80,647 mi), was claimed by a Briton, Ken Webb, and appeared briefly in the Guinness Book of Records before being removed) Menzies decided in 1952 to beat Nicholson's distance regardless, to set an unofficial veterans' record, and to ride 63,000 mi (101,000 km) to mark his 63rd birthday. Jock Wadley wrote:

We have known René Menzies a long time now... It was therefore not much of a surprise at 1.30pm on December 31, 1951, just as we had closed for press, to get a 'phone call from René saying he was starting his record at midnight. 'Yes, René,' we said. "Which record?"

'Why, of course, the year's mileage record, of course!...' Only four watched that story translated into reality as we saw him off at about twenty past midnight on January 1, 1952. He started without much trade support, but with supreme confidence in his ability to command it as he went along. 'I post my first card from the post office at Marble Arch,' he called out... Since then these cards have showered on our office – there must have been well over 1,000 of them. Each one was signed at the start of a day's ride, at the 'turn', and again at the finish by anybody who happened to be around (postmen, policemen and pull-up-for-carmen-café workers were the chief witnesses), the mileage at each point being logged according to the speedometer reading.

He left from Big Ben in central London as it chimed in 1 January. He wore three woollen sweaters, a beret and plus-fours. He started with a circuit of Parliament Square and rode to Oxford Circus, then Marble Arch to end his first day at Wolverhampton after 121 miles. At one stage he considered returning to France to ride the same roads as the Tour de France. He was dissuaded by the race official, Jacques Goddet, who sent a telegram: "Menzies – don't be a fool. Stay where you have roads like a velodrome. Don't you know when you're well off?" Menzies completed the year with 62,785 miles, beating Nicholson's figure at 10.16 am on the last day. Among those who celebrated with him was another Frenchman, Marcel Planes, who set the first distance record, 34,366 miles, in 1911.

== Death ==
Menzies died whilst pedalling around Hyde Park Corner, one of the busiest junctions in London.

== See also ==
- Tommy Godwin – Endurance cyclist
- Ken Webb – Endurance cyclist
