= Walter Greaves (cyclist) =

British cyclist

Personal information
- Full name: Walter William Greaves
- Born: April–June 1907 United Kingdom
- Died: 1987

Cycling career
- Sport: Cycling
- Discipline: Road - Endurance rider
- Role: Rider
- Rider type: All-rounder

Amateur team
- -: Airedale CC

Major wins
- World Endurance record for a single year: 45,383 miles (73,037 km) in 1936

Walter William Greaves (April–June 1907 – 1987) was a British cyclist who set the world record for distance ridden in a year - despite having only one arm and falling off numerous times. Greaves rode 45,383 miles (73,037 km) in 1936.

== Personal life ==
Greaves was born in 1907, his birth was registered in the North Bierley district, Yorkshire. He lived with his mother in Newlands Place, Undercliffe, Bradford. He lost an arm in a road accident when he was 14. One account says his father owned a car with running boards. His father was driving after drinking and Greaves opened the door, stood on the running board ready to jump, but was hit by a tram. His arm was so damaged that it was amputated below the elbow. Other accounts said that he had hung the arm out of a train window.

He developed an interest in communism which did little to help him find work as an engineer. According to the historian John Naylor, Greaves was unemployed and according to some, almost destitute. Unemployment in Bradford was high but "his reputation as a lefty troublemaker made employers reluctant to take him on". Tim Teale, a Leeds cyclist who knew Greaves said "Walter tried to make you sign up for the young communists but nobody took much notice".

Greaves was an outspoken teetotaller, a practice which had a sequel when he broke the record.

== The 1936 World Endurance record ==
=== Record background ===
In 1911 the weekly magazine Cycling began a competition for the highest number of 100 mile rides or "centuries" in a single year. The winner was Marcel Planes with 332 centuries in which he covered 34,366 miles (55,307 km). The inspiration for the competition was said to be the efforts of Harry Long, a commercial traveller who rode a bicycle on his rounds covering every part of England and Scotland and who covered 25,376 miles (40,839 km) in 1910. The world record for distance cycled in a year began in an era when bicycle companies competed to show their machines were the most reliable. The record has been officially established nine times. A tenth claim, by the English rider Ken Webb, was later disallowed. (Note: Ken Webb's claim was for 80,647 miles (129,789 km) in 1972. Webb insisted he had completed the distance but others said he hadn't and he was removed from the Guinness Book of Records.)

World Endurance record for a single year
| Year | Record holder | Country | Distance | Ref |
|---|---|---|---|---|
| 1911 | Marcel Planes | France | 34,366 miles (55,307 km) | |
| 1932 | Arthur Humbles | Great Britain | 36,007 miles (57,948 km) | |
| 1933 | Ossie Nicholson | Australia | 43,966 miles (70,756 km) | |
| 1936 | Walter Greaves | Great Britain | 45,383 miles (73,037 km) | |
| 1937 | Bernard Bennett | Great Britain | 45,801 miles (73,710 km) | |
| 1937 | René Menzies | France | 61,561 miles (99,073 km) | |
| 1937 | Ossie Nicholson | Australia | 62,657 miles (100,837 km) | |
| 1939 | Bernard Bennett | Great Britain | 65,127 miles (104,812 km) | |
| 1939 | Tommy Godwin | Great Britain | 75,065 miles (120,805 km) | |

=== Preparations ===
The record that Greaves attempted had been set three years earlier by the Australian professional Ossie Nicholson. John Naylor said:

[Nicholson] completed his ride in fine Australian weather, on good roads, with the best equipment and even a back-up vehicle. Much of it was even done on a smooth track, using a special bike. He had a masseur, and a manager who did all the planning, booking and ordering. The contrast with Walter Greaves couldn't be more stark.

Greaves appealed to the cycle trade for sponsorship but had little success. Three Spires Cycles of Coventry provided a bicycle and a small weekly sum in return for advertising rights. (Note: Three Spires Cycles of Coventry advertised a "Greaves Record" model for £6 2s 6d, or £6.12½p in decimal sterling.) Cyclists around the country offered him accommodation but help from the cycle trade came only once his ride had started.

A report said Greaves was so short of money that he wore clothes "little more than worn-out rags" and lay awake worrying the ride would not continue for lack of funds.

=== The bicycle ===
The Three Spires bicycle had a modified handlebar and twist-grip gear-change to fit Greaves and his single arm. A single lever operated both brakes. But it was not ready when the attempt was due to start on 1 January 1936 and arrived five days later. The record had to be started on 1 January and completed by 31 December. The delay increased the daily distance Greaves was obliged to ride.

Unlike Nicholson's machine, Greaves' bicycle was heavy, with thick tyres to cope with snow and pitted roads. He rode with mudguards, lamps and a saddlebag. His bike had a three-speed derailleur with ratios of 59, 71 and 79 inches (2,000 mm). He later increased the gears to 65, 73 and 78. John Naylor said:

How on earth he rode a heavy, loaded bike up all those hills on a 59-inch (1,500 mm) gear and with only one arm is beyond me. And much of the riding was in the Pennines, up long steep gradients. According to his friend, Billy Woods, a special adaptation was made some time into the ride, a kind of cup for the arm-stump which fitted on to a handlebar extension. This allowed his left hand to put its weight on the bike and balance things out a bit. It must have been a tremendous relief, yet still wouldn't have helped him to pull on the bars when climbing.

Alan Magson, in a description of the bicycle, said: "It looks like a fairly standard road bike - not that different from today's machine outwardly at least. Not much in the way of brakes - but then he was trying to break a record and roads were considerably quieter then."

=== The 1936 record ride ===
Records had to be attempted during a single calendar year, but Greaves started his ride five days late because of the delay in delivering his bicycle. He rode in one of the hardest winters for years, with snow and ice lying until the end of February. He covered 500 miles (800 km) in the first five days but fell off 19 times, including eight times in a day while riding through snow on high roads. A report in the Bradford Telegraph and Argus, written by a reporter who followed him by car, records that Greaves fell twice in the first 10 miles (16 km) of the day as cars forced him off the road. In Leeds, he was blinded by a cloud of steam from a steam-powered vehicle, slipped on tram lines and fell off. He got up, cycled out of the city through lying snow and maintained his average 15 mph (24 km/h).

The Telegraph and Argus report was headlined Persistence on a bicycle and began "W.W. Greaves, the one-armed Bradford cyclist, is a hero."

Greaves averaged 120 miles (190 km) a day by the end of February. The snow and ice were replaced by gales, hail and rain but Greaves increased his daily rate to 134 miles (216 km). It rained through the summer and then turned foggy all November.

The cycling importer and patron, Ron Kitching, said:

Walter used to ride over to Harrogate and I asked him how he was managing with all the ice and snow. Apparently he just kept riding round and round the streets until they were cleared in order to get the miles in. I remember he used to ride with a feeding bottle with milk in it, and eat apples. He was a true vegetarian. And tough!

Greaves collided with a car (Note: Various reports of his crash at Yarm in July cite a car or a lorry or a telegraph pole.) at Yarm in July and an abscess developed as a result. Greaves lost two weeks in hospital. He rode 160 miles (260 km) a day while recovering from the operation. From 20 September to 8 October he rode 180 miles (290 km) a day. He rode into Hyde Park, London on 13 December and rode laps of the Serpentine to match Nicholson's record. He was joined by thousands of other cyclists, including the holder of the 1932 record, Albert Arthur Humbles.

A reception was held in a hotel that evening. Greaves had been a vegetarian since he was 20 and was a fervent teetotaller. Journalists at the reception offered him champagne to celebrate, making comments such as "Go on... We won't tell!" Greaves said:

"When I want to poison myself, I'll do it with arsenic."

Greaves rode from 8 October until the end of the year to push himself further ahead Nicholson. He nevertheless rode 130 miles (210 km) a day, finishing his year at midnight on New Year's Eve at the steps of the town hall in Bradford. The Telegraph and Argus reported "astonishing scenes reminiscent of those associated with the public appearances of famous film stars." The mayor gave him cheques and two trophies.

Greaves' greatest distance in a day was 275 miles (443 km). His longest without sleep was 374 miles (602 km). The shortest day, 67 miles (108 km), finished early because he fell off and had to repair his bicycle.

=== End of the record ===
Greaves record was set to fall even as he reached Bradford town hall. Next day another amateur rider, Bernard Bennett, set off to ride 45,801 miles (73,710 km). The record fell twice more the same year, the second time to René Menzies - who matched the record at Alexandra Palace with Greaves beside him

Cycling reported:

Bernard Bennett was reported to say that he was attempting the record just for fun. He set the new record figure of 45,801 miles (73,710 km) and also setting a new world record of 100,000 miles (160,000 km) in 642 days. As all this competition was going on in the United Kingdom, a year's race had commenced between two widely separated contestants, Ossie Nicholson from Down Under who had already tasted success, and a newcomer, René Menzies, a 48-year-old Frenchman of Scottish descent. René rode in the UK and on the Continent, searching for the hotter weather... Many miles away, Nicholson had found better weather and financial support; at the end of his year he had collected an amazing 62,567 miles (100,692 km) thus time tasting more than glory as he had also pedalled his way clear of beating the 100,000 miles (160,000 km) record, this time in 532 days.

Tommy Godwin set the record at 75,065 miles (120,805 km) in 1939 with the support of a bicycle factory, a manager and pacers. He went on to ride 100,000 miles (160,000 km) in 499 days.

== The Golden Book ==
Walter Greaves' achievements were celebrated in 1937 when Cycling Weekly awarded him his own page in the Golden Book of Cycling.

== Life after the record ==
Greaves became a member of the British League of Racing Cyclists, an organisation which broke away from the National Cyclists Union during the Second World War to promote massed racing on the open road. (Note: The Bradford Telegraph and Argus (21 September 2001) quoted Ron Kitching : [Greaves] joined the BLRC and started road-racing. ... if you eased up there would be Walter with one arm. What a man!) He also founded the Airedale Olympic cycling club and in 1949 organised a race from Bradford to Morecambe and back, and his prominent 'route markers' became a renowned distraction to normal traffic. (Note: The Bradford Telegraph and Argus (21 September 2001) reported that He painted a white arrow from Keighley Road into Swadford Street to take competitors out on the A59 via Broughton Road ... bringing complaints from drivers who thought it signalled a new road system.)

Greaves had a cycle shop in Bradford and built cycle frames in the late 1940s. He was a talented and innovative frame builder. All of his frames were sif-bronze welded, for lightness and strength. No lugs were used. The ‘La Victoire’ was of conventional design, while the ‘King of the Mountains’ was an unconventional short wheelbase type, built to his own design. It featured an almost upright seat tube with a specially formed seat pin which placed the saddle over the back wheel. There is a ‘King of the Mountains’ on display in Bradford Industrial Museum. The frame was built in 1948 and has nothing to do with his record ride, which was achieved on a Three Spires 'King of Clubs' bicycle.

Later, after a fire at his shop, he moved to Craven Forge beside the Leeds-Liverpool canal, halfway between Keighley and Skipton, it was then known as Winifred's Café.(53.909°N 1.989°W) According to the Telegraph and Argus, Greaves "struggled to make a living in the café and took a job at Water House Pressings. The café was later converted into a forge, making and selling garden ornaments. He also took to writing and singing songs in clubs and pubs in the area."

Greaves kept a monkey as a pet in the flat above the café, where he lived with his wife. He seems to have had an interest in exotic animals: the minutes of Yorkshire section of the British League of Racing Cyclists show that members had to talk him out of his plan to have a dancing bear for the annual dinner.

Greaves contracted Parkinson's disease in 1979, and died in 1987, aged 80.

Peter Duncan, an official of the Vegetarian Cycling and Athletic Club to which both belonged, said:

I stopped my car in the lay-by near the café about three years ago waiting for a friend to catch me up. As I waited, a frail, ragged scarecrow emerged from one of the huts and tottered laboriously up the steps to the house. With a shock I noticed that the left sleeve of the ragged overcoat was empty and I realised that this walking skeleton was all that was left of the robust, fanatical Walter that I had known in the 40s or 50s.

Greaves had been a single-minded, determined man described as reluctant to give way in arguments. The friendship between him and Duncan ended at a club meeting in 1951 when the two disagreed at an annual meeting and Duncan reported that Greaves said:

"I'll punch your head in and do it publicly."
