= Cerro Negro =

Active volcano in Nicaragua

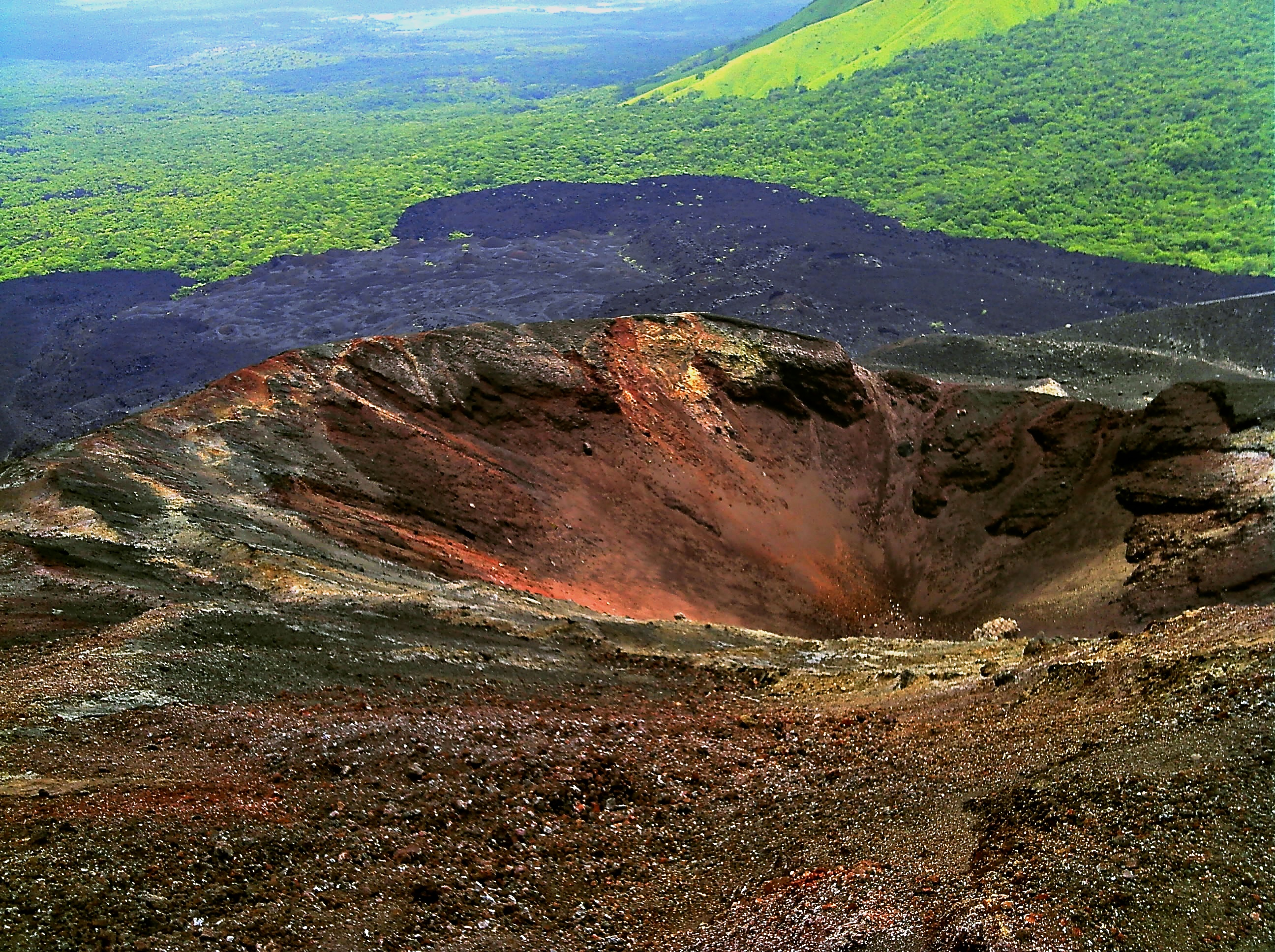
- Cerro Negro on August 20, 2011

Highest point
- Elevation: 728 m (2,388 ft)
- Coordinates: 12°30′22″N 86°42′07″W

Geography
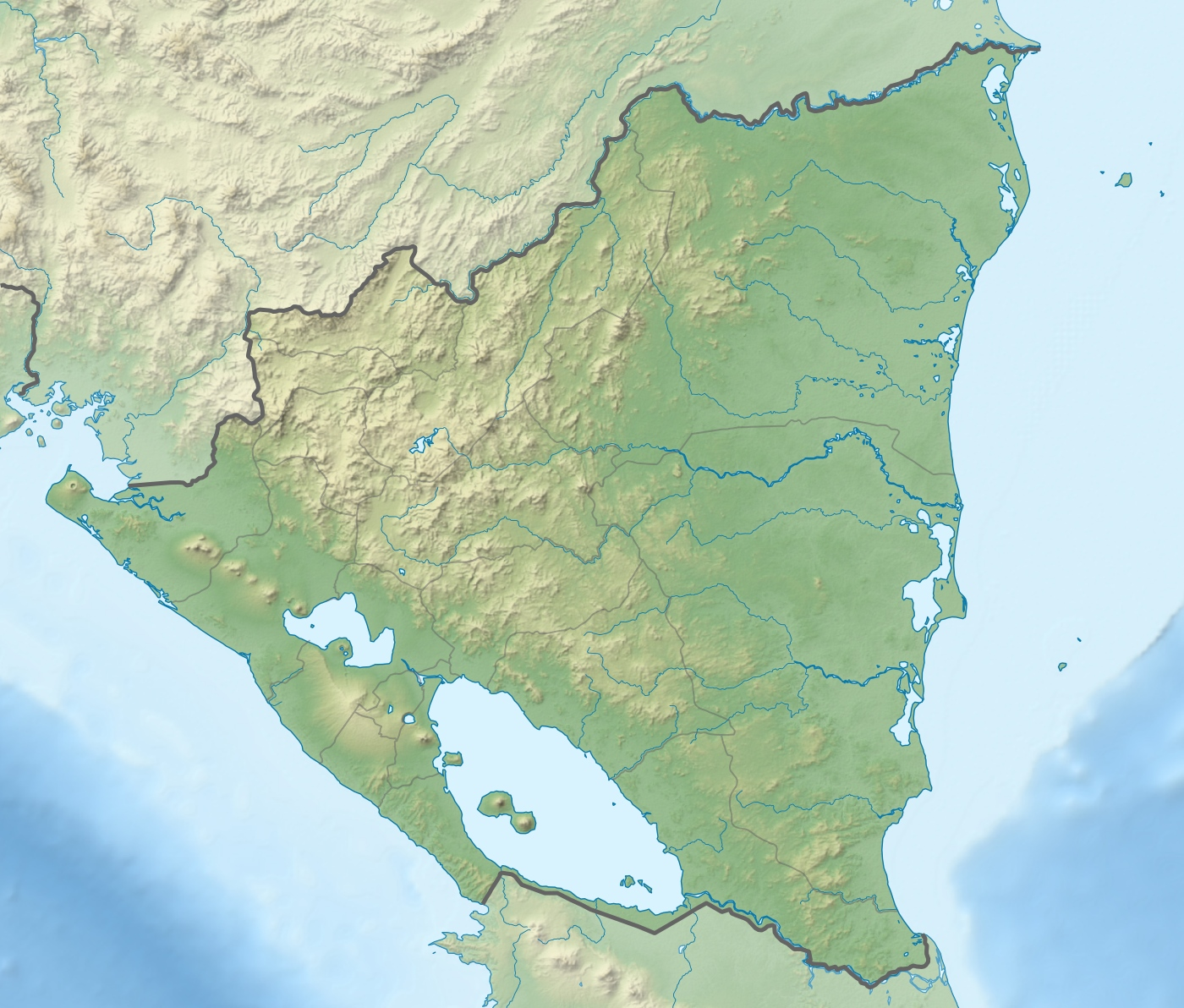
- Location within Nicaragua
- Location: León Department, Nicaragua
- Parent range: Cordillera de los Maribios

Geology
- Mountain type: Cinder cones
- Volcanic arc: Central America Volcanic Arc
- Last eruption: August 1999

Cerro Negro is an active volcano in the Cordillera de los Maribios mountain range in Nicaragua, about 10 km (6.2 mi) from the village of Malpaisillo. It is a very new volcano, the youngest in Central America, having first appeared in April 1850. It consists of a gravelly basaltic cinder cone, which contrasts greatly with the surrounding verdant hillsides, and gives rise to its name, which means Black Hill. Cerro Negro has erupted frequently since its first eruption. One unusual aspect of several eruptions has been the emission of ash from the top of the cone, while lava erupts from fractures at the base.

Cerro Negro is a polygenetic cinder cone that is part of the Central America Volcanic Arc, which formed as a result of the Cocos Plate subducting under the Caribbean Plate, at a rate of 9 cm (3.5 in) per year. It is the largest and southernmost of four cinder cones that have formed along a NW-SE trend line in the Cordillera de los Maribios mountain range. Despite its youth, Cerro Negro has been one of the most active volcanoes in Nicaragua, with its latest eruption occurring in 1999. Since its birth in 1850, it has erupted approximately 23 times.

== Eruptive history ==
The first recorded eruption of Cerro Negro occurred on April 13, 1850 and volcanic activity lasted until May 27. Central vent and explosive eruptions transpired, with lava flow and damage to land and property. The Volcanic Explosivity Index (VEI) was recorded at 2 out of 8, classifying the eruption as Strombolian/Vulcanian. Finally, the lava volume was recorded to be 5.4 × 10 and the tephra volume was 6.5 × 10^{5} m^{3}.

Cerro Negro's second eruption took place on November 14, 1867 and volcanic activity lasted until November 30. Radial fissure and explosive eruptions occurred, with some lava flows, the NE-SW trend line fissure. The VEI was also recorded at 2 (Strombolian/Vulcanian), and the tephra volume was 8.6 × 10^{6} m^{3}.

The third eruption of Cerro Negro occurred 32 years later and lasted from November 22 to November 29, 1899. Explosive eruptions resulted in damaged land, and the VEI was also recorded as a 2. Finally, the tephra volume was documented at 1.7 × 10^{6} m^{3}.

From October 28 to November 3, 1914, the volcano erupted explosively at the central vent. Mudslides also resulted in increased damage to the land, but there were no fatalities because they did not flow over any villages or towns. Although the VEI was yet again 2, the tephra volume was a recorded 2.8 × 10^{6} m^{3}.

Five years later, Cerro Negro erupted again from June 20–30, 1919, with explosive eruptions resulting in a VEI of 2. No tephra or lava volumes were recorded at this time.

Just four years after that, from October 23 until December 11, 1923, Cerro Negro erupted along the summit and upper north flank. Central vent and radial fissure explosions erupted during this time, and lava flows were recorded in this VEI 3 sub-plinian eruption. It was the largest eruption in the history of the volcano, with the lava volume being 1.0 × 10^{7} m^{3} and the tephra volume being 3.6 × 10^{7} m^{3}.

Cerro Negro erupted next on February 10, 1929, and volcanic activity lasted until March. Flank (excentric) vent and radial fissures also explosively erupted, resulting in excessive lava flows. The volume of lava erupted was recorded at only 1.0 × 10^{5} m^{3} in the VEI 2 eruption.

=== Eruptions of 1947, 1948 and 1950 ===
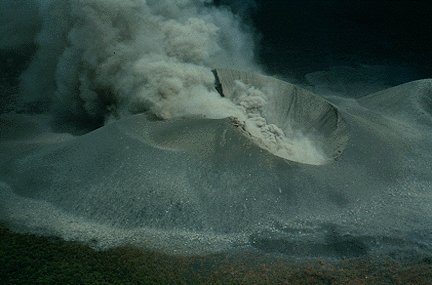
Eruption of Cerro Negro in 1948

Another 18 years passed before Cerro Negro erupted again, but on July 9, 1947 the volcano had its largest eruption to date. The VEI was recorded at 3 along the summit and NE flank, with the eruptive characteristics including central vent eruption, flank venting, and lava flows. Evacuations were called for the Malpaisillo village, and major land and property damage resulted from the volcano's explosive eruptions. The recorded lava volume was 3.8 × 10^{6} m^{3} and the recorded tephra volume was 3.1 × 10^{7} m^{3}.

Less than one year later, on March 31, 1948, Cerro Negro recorded another Strombolian eruption (VEI 2) from its central vent. No lava or tephra volumes were recorded, however. A similar eruption occurred in June 1949, with the VEI 2 eruption exploding from the central vent.

Another sub-plinian VEI 3 explosive vulcanian eruption occurred from Cerro Negro's central vent from November 21 to December 17, 1950. Lava flows resulted, but evacuation was unnecessary. The lava volume was 1.0 × 10^{5} m^{3} and the tephra volume was 3.8 × 10^{7} m^{3} for this particular eruption.

=== 1954 eruption ===
In February 1954 another VEI 2 Strombolian eruption exploded out of Cerro Negro's central vent, but lava and tephra volumes were not recorded. Three years later from September 4–24, 1957, a VEI of 2 was recorded via the summit and east flank of Cerro Negro. Lava flows damaged the land from the explosive eruption, with the lava volume reaching 4.5 × 10^{6} m^{3} and the tephra volume reaching 2.8 × 10^{6} m^{3}.

The summit and south flank exploded next on September 28, 1960, and volcanic activity continued until December 26. This particular VEI was determined to be level 3 after radial fissure and central vent eruptions occurred. Land damage was caused to the surrounding land via lava flows, with the volume of the lava recorded at 5.2 × 10^{6} m^{3} and the tephra volume recorded at 3.4 × 10^{7} m^{3}.

Cerro Negro's NE-flank fissure erupted next on October 25, 1961. Although radial fissure eruption and lava flow was characteristic of this particular eruption, the VEI was only recorded as a 1, and no lava or tephra volumes were recorded. It was the smallest Cerro Negro eruption to date.

Another eruption from the central vent occurred on March 21, 1962 and lasted until early April. The VEI was recorded as 2, and lava flows were observed, although no land damage was witnessed. Exactly one year later, a VEI 1 eruption occurred from the central vent of Cerro Negro on March 21, 1963.

=== 1968 eruption ===
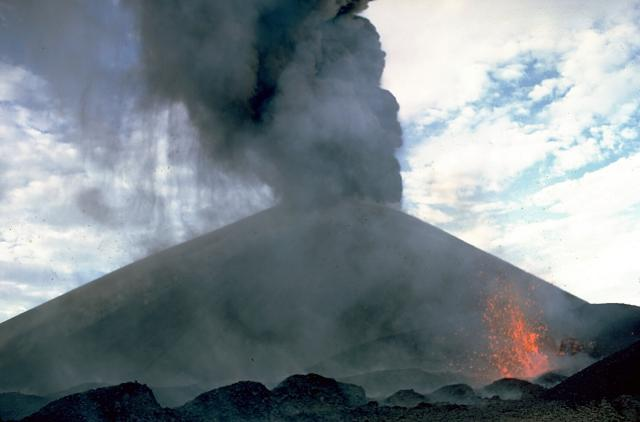
Eruption of Cerro Negro in 1968

The volcanic activity from October 23 until December 10, 1968 marked the formation of the Cristo Rey crater, when the summit and south flank of Cerro Negro erupted with a sub-plinian VEI of 3. The new vent formed a lava flow 750m long and 600m wide and a thickness of 3m. Thirteen villages located near the erupting volcano were evacuated on the 27th because of the excessive ash falls. Additional larger-scale evacuations Nicaragua's 2nd largest city, León, recorded ash falls of over 1 cm thick. Lava flows advanced at a rate of 23 m/day, and it caused additional land damage as the lava poured from three of Cerro Negro's craters, fountaining to heights of 30m into the air. The eruptive ash columns reached heights of 2.3 to 4.8 km. In addition, incandescent gases from the vents raised to heights of 120 meters, and these could be seen over 50 km away from the volcano. When the volcanic activity ceased, the lava volume totaled 6.9 × 10^{6} m^{3} and the tephra volume totaled 2.7 × 10^{7} m^{3}.

=== 1969 eruption ===
Another small-scale VEI 1 eruption took place after the central vent exploded from December 19–29, 1969. But two years later from February 3–14, 1971, the towns surrounding Cerro Negro were again evacuated due to the sudden sub-plinian VEI 3 eruption of the summit and the formation and eruption of a new eastern flank. Volcanic bombs were shot approximately 600m into the air, and incandescent gases were released during the time in between eruptions. Ash columns were approximately 10 km high, and a tephra volume of 5.8 × 10^{7} m^{3} (over 300 square kilometers) caused major damage to the local crops and buildings. The city of León alone had recorded 18 cm of ash, which resulted in large-scale building collapse.

=== 1992 eruption ===
Over 20 years passed, and the Cerro Negro volcano was at peace until one of the volcano's largest eruptions occurred on April 9, 1992. Volcanic activity lasted for a total of five days, with the main sub-plinian eruption (VEI 3) occurring over a two-day time period, producing an ash column that was roughly seven kilometers high. Over 20,000 people were immediately evacuated, mostly due to failed water systems until eruptions ceased on the 14th of April. This eruption caused several fatalities, and widespread damage to land and property after the tephra volume measured 2.6 × 10^{7} m^{3}. This large tephra volume produced approximately four centimeters of ash across most of León, resulting in many collapsed roofs and additional injuries and fatalities.

=== 1995 eruption ===
Three years later, volcanic activity started on May 29, 1995, which marked the beginning of the first phase of this eruption. Small, phreatic eruptions occurred frequently during this phase, averaging 100-160 explosions per day. These Strombolian eruptions generated convective ash columns that reached heights of 200–1000 meters, and these explosions lasted for a period of 79 days. A low-energy pyroclastic flow was observed on the northwestern flank on June 2. After June 6, the number of eruptions decreased gradually at a rate of 30-40 eruptions per day. By July 19, all volcanic activity ceased for a period of 95 days. By mid-November, the hiatus ended and the second phase commenced. Eruptions continued for a period of thirteen days and lasted until December 3, 1995. During this time, the eruptions were larger, and volcanic bombs and blocks up to two meters in diameter were ejected from Cerro Negro. Ash columns achieve heights of 2 to 2.5 meters While the VEI was only measured as a 2, central vent explosions, pyroclastic flows, phreatic explosions, and lava dome extrusion were all characteristic of this eruption period. New lava filled about 2/3 of the 1992 crater, and additional lava flows caused damage to land, extending 1.5 km north of the north base cone. Ash falls caused damage to property and farmland, with an average deposit of two millimeters per day in León (~20 km from volcano), but there were no fatalities during the safe evacuation of 6000 people in the surrounding villages. Overall, the lava flow volume reached 8.0 × 10^{6} m^{3} and the tephra volume peaked at 5.8 × 10^{6} m^{3} during this eruption period, resulting in the addition of about 50 meters of height to the cinder cone.

=== 1999 eruption ===
The last volcanic activity at Cerro Negro occurred on August 5, 1999 and lasted for a total of two days. Three earthquakes (M_{w} 5.2) occurred in three hours, which triggered a small-scale eruption of the volcano. It was the first time in the history of Cerro Negro that large-magnitude earthquakes preceded the eruption. The VEI was only recorded as a 1, as the south flank (near the Cristo Rey crater) experienced radial fissure eruption, along with explosive and phreatic eruptions, in the formation of three new vents. Small-scale evacuations of surrounding villages were carried out, but the low-volatile, highly crystalline basaltic magma only had a lava volume of 6 × 10^{5} m^{3}. Additionally, the tephra volume was only in the 106m3 range. It was concluded that the volcanic activity of Cerro Negro in 1999 was tectonically-induced, and had three earthquakes not occurred, the eruption would have also not occurred.

The most recent eruptions at Cerro Negro occurred in August 1999, although strong seismic activity was registered in early 2004. In 1998, an eruption was thought to have occurred shortly after the passage of Hurricane Mitch, but it later transpired that the copious amounts of steam seen rising from the volcano were caused by rainwater percolating through to hot lava from the 1995 eruption.

Following the 1999 eruption, the summit crater and fissures created from this eruption are currently the main source of volcanic gas flux today. It is estimated that the total CO_{2} output of Cerro Negro is conservatively estimated to be 2,800 t d-1.

Although the Cerro Negro volcano has only been around for a period of 159 years, it has erupted at least 23 times, which is highly active compared to most volcanoes. This historical growth of the volcano has allowed for documentation of the growth of this volcano over time. It was discovered that the timing of future eruptions is correlated with the volume of the previous significant eruption. Since there have been steady-state eruptions since 1900, a Cerro Negro Time-Volume Prediction Model was made.

Although a small-scale eruption did occur in 1999, another larger-scale eruption is expected to occur in the immediate future. Cerro Negro does not differ from most volcanoes, in that numerous hazards are associated with volcanic activity. These hazards include lava flows, mudslides, pyroclastic flows, and earthquakes, but the biggest hazard of Cerro Negro is the effects of the ash and tephra fallouts.

Currently, Cerro Negro is being monitored by the Nicaraguan Seismic Network, which is affiliated with INETER (Instituto Nicaragüense de Estudios Territoriales). These programs have a total of 36 stations throughout Nicaragua, and they each have a monitoring station on Cerro Negro. Seismic activity, gas concentrations, surface deformation, and temperature fluctuations are all carefully watched in order to mitigate the effects of a possible eruption.

As Cerro Negro lies in a less-populated area of Nicaragua, there is less volcanic risk to human life compared to many of the other volcanoes in the world. Mudslides and pyroclastic flows that come from Cerro Negro are not in the direct path of major cities or towns. Nevertheless, the eruptions of Cerro Negro have been known to cause catastrophic damage to buildings and farmland, due to the widespread ash falls and tephra fallouts.

== See also ==
- List of volcanoes in Nicaragua
