= John Gavin Bone =

Scottish cyclist (1914–1983)

Jackie "Mulguy" Bone
Personal information
- Full name: John Gavin Bone
- Born: 17 September 1914 Milngavie, Glasgow, Scotland
- Died: 23 June 1983 (aged 68) Glasgow, Scotland

Cycling career
- Sport: Cycling

Amateur team
- 1932-: Glasgow Wheelers C.C.

Major wins
- 1935 set Scottish and British records with 244¾ miles in 12-hours. 1937 won the 'first televised cycle race in the UK'

John Gavin "Mulguy" Bone (17 September 1914 – 23 June 1983) was a Scottish amateur cyclist who competed in the Cycling at the 1936 Summer Olympics in Berlin.

In 1935 he set new Scottish and British records with a total distance of 244¾ miles in 12-hours. He went on to become the first Scotsman to figure in the British Best All-Rounder list of prize winners when he was classified tenth with an average speed of 21.303 m.p.h. His early achievements were celebrated in 1936 when Cycling Weekly awarded him his own page in the Golden Book of Cycling. In 1937 at Alexandra Palace he won the 'first televised cycle race in the UK' - the Sunday Pictorial Cycling Festival.

== Career ==
Milngavie-born Bone joined the Glasgow United C.C and, in March, 1934, rode his first race, a novices 25-mile road event, which he won in 1 hour 8 minutes 55 seconds, the fastest time returned by a Scottish novice that year. He was the first Scotsman to figure in the British Best All-Rounder list of prize winners when he was classified tenth with an average speed of 21.303 m.p.h.

In August 1935 he set new Scottish and British records with a total distance of 244¾ miles in the West Scotland T.T.A 12-hour event. The West of Scotland time trial was run over a 211-mile route around the coast with incursions inland in the Linwood area, followed by laps around a 7-mile circuit that was calibrated by the time keepers.

Bone exceeded the marked distance by so much that he had to be sent off in the direction of Paisley over cobbled streets to finish his 12 hours. Later the same day, in England, an English rider finished a 12-hour event with a greater distance to set a new record, so he was the British Record Holder for only a short period. In 1936 he finished second in the 'Manx International Cycle Road Race', run over the 37.75 mile TT course on the Isle of Man.

On 29 May 1937 he won the 17 mile road race at the Sunday Pictorial Cycling Festival, held at Alexandra Palace in London. In front of 10,000 people and television cameras, and against opposition that included Hubert Opperman, Percy Stallard, Bill Messer, 'Shake' Earnshaw and 'Ernie' Hussey, he broke away on lap 3 of the 11 lap race and survived until the finish.

== The Golden Book ==
Bone's achievements were celebrated in 1936 when Cycling Weekly awarded him his own page in the Golden Book of Cycling, which is now held in 'The Pedal Club' archive.

== Personal life ==
Bone died in Glasgow on 23 June 1983, at the age of 68.
