= Sid Ferris =

English long-distance cyclist (1908-1993)

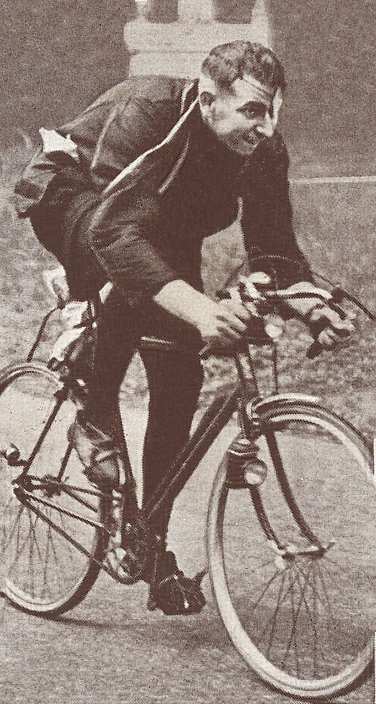

Personal information
- Full name: Sidney Herbert Ferris
- Nickname: "Sid"
- Born: c.1908 Hounslow
- Died: August 1993
- Spouse: 54 years to Eileen (died July 1993)
- Children: 2 daughters - Pamela and Jennifer

Cycling career
- Sport: Cycling
- Current team: Retired
- Discipline: Long distance

Amateur team
- -: Vegetarian Cycling and Athletic Club

Major wins
- 1930 & 1932 - Vegetarian C&AC team won British Best All-Rounder; 1932, 1933, 1934 - North Road 24 hours time-trial 1937 - Record Edinburgh-to-London, 1937 - Record Land's End to John O'Groats; 1937 - World record 1,000 miles

Sidney Herbert Ferris (c. 1908) was an English long-distance cyclist who broke the records for Edinburgh-to-London, Land's End to John O'Groats, and 1,000 miles in 1937.

Sid Ferris won the North Road 24-hours Time Trial three years in succession and was a member of the winning Vegetarian Cycling and Athletic Club team in the Best All-rounder Competitions of 1930 and 1932.

His achievements were celebrated in 1937 when Cycling Weekly awarded him his own page in the Golden Book of Cycling.

== Personal life ==
Sid Ferris' parents ran a cycle business at Hounslow and were reportedly known to the cycling fraternity as 'Mum and Dad Ferris'.

Sid Ferris had only one eye, so he wore a patch over his left eye. Sid Ferris was born in Lambeth on October 1907. Married Eileen Newman in 1935, they were married for 58 years. They had two daughters Pamela and Jennifer. Sid died in August 1993 ( six weeks after the passing of Eileen.)

=== Harry Ferris ===
Sid's brother Harry (H.E.G.Ferris) ran 'Ferris Cycles', the bicycle shop and frame building business at 220 and 521 Bath Road, Hounslow, Middlesex, and was a successful amateur cyclist for 30 years. In Cycling Magazine, 1952, he advertised sophisticated "low temperature silver brazed" frames. He was known for his own unique designs and shapes. Harry was also a competitive cyclist, in September 1934 he broke the record for the 211-mile 'London-Bath-London' with a ride of 12 hours 2 minutes 23 seconds on his own design/build of tricycle.

Harry Ferris competed in solo, tandem and tricycle events from 1928 to 1959. He won several Gold awards from the 'Charlotteville Cycling Club' (Guildford) mostly for Club Records. Between 1925-1934 he also won Gold Medals from the 'Vegetarian and Athletic Club' including '210 miles on a Tricycle in 12hrs, and London to Bath and back. From 1932/33 Harry won Gold awards from 'South Western Cycling Club' in Solo and Tandem classes, these included a gold 'Southern Roads Medallion' for 12hrs. He won Silver awards from 'The Calleva Road Club', 'Southern Roads', 'Southern Counties Cycling Union', 'Southwest Roads Club', 'Charlotteville' and the 'Vegetarians & Athletic Clubs' among others.

== Career ==
Ferris rode for the Vegetarian Cycling and Athletic Club from the 1920s.

In 1930 he won the Anerley B.C. 12-hour time-trial with a score of 232 1/2 miles.

A talented all-round rider, he competed in events from 25 miles to 24 hours. He was a member of the winning Vegetarian team in the Best All-rounder Competitions of 1930 and 1932 and he achieved 11th in the individual classification in 1933. Ferris won the North Road 24 Hours Time Trial three times in succession in 1932, 1933 and 1934.

Ferris turned professional in 1936. He was recruited by Raleigh Bicycle Company, along with Bert James and Charles Holland, to regain long-distance records and to promote Sturmey-Archer hub gears against the new "continental" derailleur gears.

In June 1937, as a training ride for the Land's End to John O'Groats, Ferris covered the 379 miles from Edinburgh to London in 20 hours 19 minutes, beating the previous record by exactly 1 1/2 hours. Unfortunately, this record breaking achievement was subsequently not recognised by the R.R.A. because an assistant had broken a rule. (See October below)

His long-distance cycling career peaked in July 1937 when he gained the two longest records on the books of the Road Records Association—the Land's End to John O'Groats and the 1,000 miles—from Australian cyclist Hubert Opperman. Ferris covered the 870 miles from Land's End to John O'Groats in 2 days 6 hours 33 minutes, beating Opperman's time by 2 hours 28 minutes. He continued to complete the 1,000 miles in 2 days 22 hours 45 minutes, 3 hours 7 minutes ahead of Opperman. The ride was completed without sleep. His record stood for 21 years.

In October 1937, when Ferris' first Edinburgh-to-London time was disallowed, Raleigh rushed him to Edinburgh on the night train for a second attempt. The prospective long night ride involved a challenge for Ferris' one good eye, which had already been strained on the Land's End to John O'Groats, but his bicycle was fitted with the new Dynohub and he endured 15 hours of darkness to break the R.R.A record.

In 1938 Ferris gained the R.R.A. 24-hour record with a distance of 465.75 miles, (461.75 miles) riding from Edinburgh to the South Coast and demonstrating the qualities of Raleigh's Dynohub.

=== Equipment ===
In 1937 Ferris' Raleigh bicycle was equipped with Lauterwasser handlebars, and Sturmey Archer AR close ratio, three-speed hub gears, and latterly. the newly invented Raleigh Dynohub. This was the last Land's End to John O'Groats record that was set with hub gears rather than derailleur gears.

"This is the Hub that helped me break the Edinburgh-to-London, Land's End to John O'Groats, and 1,000 miles records. It's exactly what we racing men have always been looking for - a totally enclosed HUB gear with a really close ratio. I'll never ride without it." (Signed) "Sid Ferris" (Raleigh Bicycle / Sturmey-Archer employee)

== Commemoration ==
=== The Golden Book ===
Sid Ferris's achievements were celebrated in 1937 when Cycling Weekly awarded him his own page in the Golden Book of Cycling.

=== Cigarette card ===
In 1939 Ferris was celebrated nationally when W.A. & A.C. Churchman issued a cigarette card of him in action. In a series of 50 cards called Kings of Speed, he was featured on card no. 33 titled S.H. Ferris.

== See also ==
- Cycling records
