= Ray Booty =

English road bicycle racer (1932-2012)

Personal information
- Full name: Raymond Charles Booty
- Nickname: The Boot
- Born: 3 September 1932 Nottingham, England
- Died: 25 August 2012 (aged 79)

Cycling career
- Sport: Cycling
- Discipline: Road
- Role: Rider

Amateur team
- Ericsson Wheelers Cycling Club
Medal record
Cycling
Representing England
British Empire & Commonwealth Games
Gold medal – first place	1958 Cardiff	road race

Raymond Charles Booty (3 September 1932 – 25 August 2012), sometimes nicknamed "The Boot", was an English road bicycle racer. In 1956 he was the first man to beat four hours for the 100 miles (160 km) individual time trial.

Booty rode for Ericsson Wheelers Cycling Club, a since-disbanded Nottinghamshire cycling club, and the Army Cycling Union. He won the national 100-mile (160 km) time trial championship every year from 1955 to 1959.

== The first sub-four-hour 100 ==
Booty broke the record in the 1956 national championship with 4h 1m 52s. The next event was the Bath Road '100' on Bank Holiday Monday 6 August 1956. The course was west of Reading, through Theale, Pangbourne, Wallingford, Shillingford, Abingdon and back down the A4 to finish near where it started. Booty rode a Raleigh bicycle with an 84-inch (2,100 mm) fixed gear to 3h 58m 28s. The second man, future professional Stan Brittain was beaten by 12 minutes.

Booty had ridden from Nottingham to the start the day before – 100 miles (160 km). For his race he was awarded a medal by Cycling and a certificate from the RTTC.

The Daily Herald reported the record, speaking of 'Booty the incomparable', and the News Chronicle said: 'Rider crashes four-hour barrier'

He was awarded the F. T. Bidlake Memorial Prize in 1956. The citation read:

Raymond Charles Booty For his superlative ride of 3 hrs. 58 mins. 28 secs. in the Bath Road Hundred of 1956, this being the first time one hundred miles had ever been ridden on a bicycle, out and home, inside four hours.

Booty recalled:

It was one of those lovely sunny summer mornings you crave for when you are time-trialling. It was calm, as I remember, and eventually it became very hot. And I was really having to hang on in the last half hour. I remember it was a real struggle. I knew I was on to a good ride if I could hang on. The thing I remember about that particular event was at the finish, and I was absolutely shattered at the finish. And I sat down. And, of course, when I finished I realised just how hot it was. I was desperate for some drink and somebody came with all they'd got, which was a bottle of milk. And it was sour. And he said it was sour. It was all he'd got. It was really sour. But I drank it all. That was the thing I remember mainly about that event.

Also in 1956 he signed the Golden Book of Cycling.

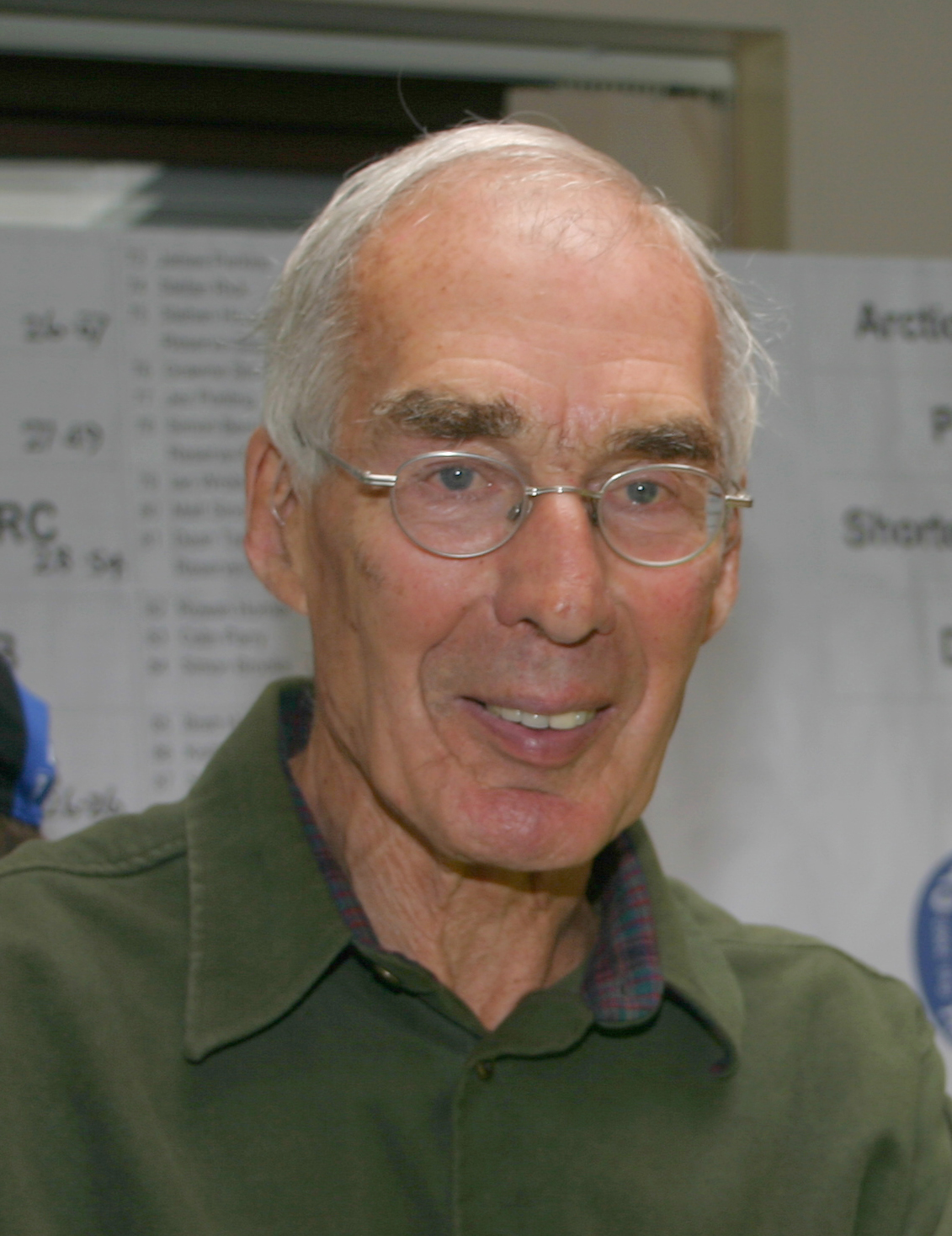
Ray Booty at the Awards Ceremony for the 2007 Team Time Trial Championship

== The straight-out record ==
In September Booty attempted the 100-mile (160 km) record under Road Records Association(RRA) rules. These allowed him to take advantage of tailwinds and gradient drop (time trials in the UK must be on out-and-back courses). He recorded 3h 28m 40s. For the event he used a Sturmey-Archer hub gear. The record stood for 34 years. It was beaten by Ian Cammish.

== More time trial success ==
Booty won the season-long British Best All-rounder competition three times from 1955 to 1957. The BBAR is based on averaged speeds over 50 and 100 miles (160 km) and for 12 hours. He was 100-mile (160 km) champion from 1955 to 1959 and 12-hour champion from 1954 to 1958.

He first broke the 100 miles (160 km) record in 1955, lowering it to 4:04:30. He broke it three times. He twice broke the 12-hour record: 265.66 miles (427.54 km) in 1956 and 266.00 miles (428.09 km) the following year.

== Road racing ==
Booty won the gold medal in the 1958 British Empire and Commonwealth Games road race in Cardiff. He won a bronze medal in the national championship road race in the same year. He also won the Manx International road race in 1954.

== Personal life ==
Booty was diagnosed with pancreatic cancer in January 2012 and died in August of that year. He was survived by his wife, Shelagh, who he married in June the same year.

== Personality ==
The cycling wholesaler and patron Ron Kitching said of Booty:

He was an iron man. But somewhere along the line I think he lacked something, the dedication to make bike-racing a full-time career. Maybe he didn't want to, but he certainly had most of the qualities. He had the strength, he could climb and of course he could time-trial. What he really needed was to be part of a good continental racing team. Then I think he would have gone to the very top. But whether or not his personality would have got in the way, that's another thing. You need a bit of modesty and humility to achieve that. I think the fact that Ray dropped right out of the sport proves that his interest didn't go deep enough. Why he went off and hid away, I don't know.
