= Golden Book of Cycling =

Literary work

- Author: Various
- Language: English
- Genre: Halls of Fame
- Publisher: Cycling Magazine
- Publication date: completed 1972
- Publication place: United Kingdom
- Media type: Handwritten

The Golden Book of Cycling was created in 1932 by Cycling, a British cycling magazine, to celebrate "the Sport and Pastime of Cycling by recording the outstanding rides, deeds and accomplishments of cyclists, officials and administrators." Only a single copy of this compendium of illuminated manuscripts exists.

Each page was crafted to honour a single cycling hero. The original book was finished in 1972, but the tradition has been continued by The Pedal Club, who also maintain the archive of the original book.

== Golden pages ==
- Frank Southall was the first cyclist to be honoured, having won the 1932 British Best All-Rounder (BBAR) competition for individual time triallists. He signed his page in front of 7,000 cyclists attending the BBAR prize-giving at the Royal Albert Hall, London.
- Harry Grant, 1932
- John Ephraim Sibbit (John Sibbit), Citation in 1932
- Albert Arthur Humbles (Arthur Humbles), Citation in 1933
- Frederick Thomas Bidlake Citation in 1933. 7,000 cyclists at the Royal Albert Hall in London watched Bidlake sign the first page during a concert to honour time-trialling champions.
- Hubert Opperman — signed the book on 13 October 1935 Opperman, later Sir Hubert Ferdinand Oppermann OBE, was regard as one of Australia's greatest sportsman. The honour of appearing in this Hall of Fame was largely overshadowed by his later honours, but his sporting background was always an important asset and led to his later honours.
- Ernest James Capell, Citation in 1935
- John Gavin Bone, Citation in 1936
- Stanley Walter Miles (Stan Miles), Citation in 1936
- W. G. (Bill) Paul and E. V. (Ernie) Mills (Mills & Paul) signed the book on 18 February 1937 as a record breaking tandem pairing. Initially they had been on opposing tandem teams but together they covered over 30 miles in one hour in 1936 and won a 10-minute pursuit race in less than four minutes.
- Charles Holland, Citation in 1937
- Sidney Herbert Ferris (Sid Ferris), Citation in 1937
- Walter William Greaves (Walter Greaves), Citation in 1937
- Cyril Heppleston, Citation in 1938
- Arthur James Wilson (Faed Wilson), Citation in 1938
- Stanley John Ambrose Cotterell (Stan Cotterell), Citation in 1938.
- Sir Harold Bowden, 2nd Baronet, Bart, C.B.E., Citation in 1938
- Willie Hume, Citation in 1938
- Thomas Edward Godwin (Tom Godwin), Citation in 1939 He was celebrated as the greatest long distance rider in the world, having ridden 75,065 miles (120,805 km) in a single year to set an endurance riding record that will never be beaten.
- Harold Earnshaw (Harry Earnshaw), Citation in 1939
- Marguerite Wilson — signed the book on 30 April 1947
- Albert Edward George Derbyshire (Albert Derbyshire), Citation in 1947
- George Herbert Fleming (George Fleming), Citation in 1947
- Reginald Hargreaves Harris (Reg Harris), Citation in 1947
- Albert Edward Walters, Citation in 1948
- George Herbert Stancer, Citation in 1948
- John William Stocks (John Stocks), Citation in 1948
- Clarence Kingsbury was recorded as 64 years old when he signed his citation page in September 1948, (6 months before his death at the age of 66). He was a British track cyclist who won two Gold medals in the 1908 Summer Olympics.
- Charles Henry Bartlett, Citation in 1948, aged 63.
- Charles George Marriner (Charlie Marriner), Citation in 1948, aged 25.
- Harry Green, Citation in 1948, aged 73.
- John William Rossiter, Citation in 1948
- Victor Louis Johnson (Vic Johnson), Citation in 1948, aged 65.
- William James Bailey (William Bailey), Citation in 1948, aged 65.
- Alfred Sydenham Ingram (Alfred Ingram), M.B.E. Citation in 1949, aged 74.
- David Marsh, Citation in 1949, aged 56.
- Horace Thomas Johnson (Thomas Johnson), Citation in 1949, aged 60.
- John Thomas Allison (John Allison), Citation in 1949, aged 22.
- Peter Beardsmore, Citation in 1949
- Cyril Francis Peacock, Citation in 1950s
- Eileen Sheridan, Citation in 1950
- Edward Russell Mockridge (Russell Mockridge), Citation in 1950s, aged 25.
- Harry Edgar Ryan, Citation in 1950
- Kenneth Howard Joy, Citation in 1950
- Mildred Jessie Robinson, Citation in 1950
- Thomas Summersgill (Tom Summersgill), Citation in 1951
- William James Pett (Bill Pett), Citation in 1951
- Albert White, Citation in 1952
- Sidney Philip Patterson (Sid Patterson), Citation in 1952
- Edith Atkins — signed the book on 12 August 1953
- John Francis Arnold, Citation in 1954
- Joyce Joan Dorothy Harris, Citation in 1954
- Victor Augustus Gibbons (Vic Gibbons), Citation in 1954
- William Harry Townsend (Will Townsend), Citation in 1954
- Henry Herbert England, Citation in 1955
- Tom Peck, Citation in 1955
- Brian Robinson, Citation in 1956, aged 25.
- Norman Leslie Sheil (Norman Sheil), Citation in 1956
- Raymond (Ray) Booty, Citation in 1956
- Albert Crimes, Citation in 1957
- Dennis Hulbert White, Citation in 1957
- David John Keeler, Citation in 1958
- Reginald Frederick (Ray) Randall, Citation in 1958
- Bryan Frank Wiltcher, Citation in 1959
- Charles Frederick Davey, Citation in 1959
- Owen George Blower (Owen Blower), Citation in 1959
- Beryl Burton, Citation in 1960
- Donald Douglas McLachlan, Citation in 1962
- Raymond Frank Colden (Ray Colden), Citation in 1962
- Brian Geoffrey Kirby, Citation in 1963
- James Peter Hill, Citation in 1964
- Thomas Middleton Barlow (Tom Barlow), Citation in 1965 President of Manchester Wheelers' Club. A copy of his citation is held at the National Cycle Library in Llandrindod Wells.
- Rex Burgess Coley (Rex Coley), Citation in 1970
- Hugh William Porter, Citation in 1972

== Chapter 2 ==
The original golden book was finally shut in 1972. In 1991 the Pedal Club started "The Pedal Club Golden Book" to resurrect the tradition.

- Christopher Boardman (Chris Boardman), Citation in 1990s, aged ?.
- Ian Scott Cammish (Ian Cammish), Citation in 1990s, aged 35.
- Tom Simpson, Posthumous Citation in 1990s.
- Ian Steel, Citation in 1990s, aged 62
- Les West (Leslie George West), Citation in 1990s.
- Ronald Robert White (Ron White), Citation in 1990s, aged 80+.
- Peter John Woodburn (John Woodburn), Citation in 1990s, aged 55.
- Sean Yates, Citation in 1990s, aged 30.
- Roy Cromack was an all-rounder, winning championship medals from 4,000 metres on the track to 24 hours on the road. He competed in the road race at the 1968 Summer Olympics in Mexico. Citation in 1991, aged 51.
- Alfred Engers (Alf Engers), Citation in 1990s, aged ?.
- Alex Moulton (Alex Moulton), CBE signed the book when he was 71, circa 1991.
- Eileen Gray, C.B.E. Citation in 1991, aged 71.
- Beryl Burton, Second Citation in 1991, aged 54.
- Amanda Ellen Jones (Mandy Jones) won the world road race championship in 1982. She signed the Golden Book circa 1991, when she was 29.
- Anthony Paul Doyle (Tony Doyle), Citation in 1992, aged 33.
- William Edward Squance (Bill Squance), Citation in 1992, aged ?.
- Charles William Messenger (Chas Messenger), Citation in 1992, aged 88.
- Douglas Graeme Obree (Graeme Obree), Citation in 1995, aged 29.
- Richard William Ewart Poole (Dick Poole), Citation in 1995, aged 63.
- Ronald Vincent Webb (Ron Webb), Citation in 1997.
- Harold George Scott (Harold Scott), Posthumous Citation in 1998, aged 87.
