= Michael Hutchinson (cyclist) =

British cyclist (born 1973)

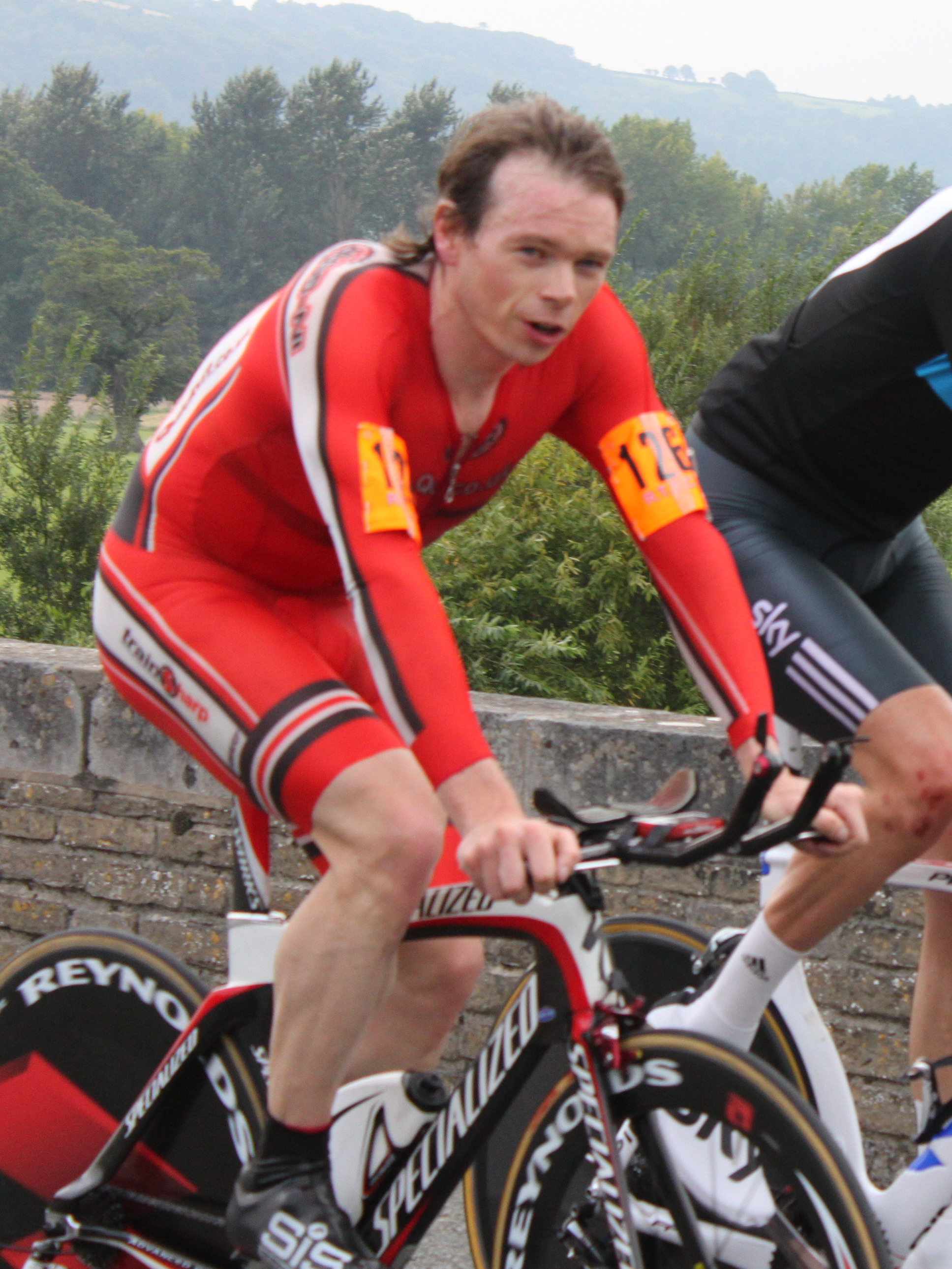
- Hutchinson at the 2010 British National Time Trial Championships

Personal information
- Full name: Michael Hutchinson
- Born: 20 November 1973 (age 52) Northern Ireland
- Height: 1.80 m (5 ft 11 in)
- Weight: 73 kg (161 lb)

Cycling career
- Sport: Cycling
- Current team: In-Gear Quickvit RT
- Disciplines: Road & Track
- Role: Rider
- Rider type: Time triallist, pursuitist

Amateur team
- Cambridge University CC

Professional teams
- Bio RT
- Team MDT-Giant
- API-Metrow
- In-Gear Quickvit RT

Michael Hutchinson (born 20 November 1973 in Northern Ireland) is a British and Irish racing cyclist and writer who has represented Great Britain, Ireland, and Northern Ireland at events including the Commonwealth Games.

Hutchinson's speciality is the individual time trial, but he has also won races on the track. He is a previous holder of the 10, 25, 30, 50 and 100-mile competition records.

He has made two unsuccessful attempts at the hour record, the first of which formed the basis of his 2006 book The Hour, which gained him the award for Best New Writer at the 2007 British Sports Book Awards.

== Cycling career ==
Hutchinson began cycling at the University of Cambridge, where he studied Law at Fitzwilliam College. As part of a university team he won the National Team 25 Championships.

He has won British titles at every distance from 10 miles to 100 miles, and is a two-time winner of the 12-hour championships. He has also won the British 4,000m track individual pursuit title.

== Coaching ==
Since 2003 Hutchinson has been coached by the exercise physiologist Jamie Pringle, who works for the English Institute of Sport.

== Sponsors ==
Hutchinson has been sponsored by Specialized since 2009 and Ultimate Sports Engineering since 2006.

== Professional career ==
Having acquired a master's degree and a PhD in International Human Rights from Fitzwilliam College, Hutchinson spent a year researching and teaching law at the University of Sussex before resolving to pursue a career as a writer. In late 2006, he started writing for Cycling Weekly.

His first book, The Hour: Sporting Immortality the Hard Way was awarded Best New Writer of the British Sports Book Awards (2007).

== Media work ==
In 2011, Hutchinson co-commentated on the World Championship Time Trial in Copenhagen for Eurosport. In 2014 when the Giro d'Italia started in Northern Ireland he was analyst for BBC television coverage.

== Honours ==
Cycling Time Trials (CTT) National Championships

Hutchinson's 56 Cycling Time Trials titles are a men's record ahead of Ian Cammish's 23. The only rider to win more is Beryl Burton with 97. The sequence of 13 consecutive 50-mile titles is also a men's record for any distance (Beryl Burton won 25 consecutive BBAR titles).

National Champion 2000

10 miles – 20m 22s – riding for Bio RT
50 miles – 1h 40m 41s – riding for Bio RT
100 miles – 3h 41m 16s – riding for Bio RT
12 hours – 293.23mls – riding for Bio RT

National Champion 2001

50 miles – 1h 41m 38s – riding for Team MDT – Giant

National Champion 2002

10 miles – 19m 19s – riding for Team MDT – Giant
50 miles – 1h 44m 10s – riding for Team MDT – Giant
British National Time Trial Championships – riding for Team MDT – Giant

National Champion 2003

50 miles – 1h 44m 31s – riding for Team MDT – Giant

National Champion 2004

50 miles – 1h 46m 09s – riding for Team MDT – Giant
100 miles – 3h 28m 59s – riding for Team MDT – Giant
British National Time Trial Championships – riding for Team MDT – Giant

National Champion 2005

10 miles – 19m 34s – riding for API-Metrow
25 miles – 47m 15s – riding for API-Metrow
50 miles – 1h 39m 40s – riding for API-Metrow
100 miles – 3h 36m 38s – riding for API-Metrow
12 hours – 285.74mls – riding for API-Metrow

National Champion 2006

10 miles – 20m 09s – riding for In-Gear Quickvit RT
50 miles – 1h 44m 34s – riding for In-Gear Quickvit RT

National Champion 2007

10 miles – 19m 43s – riding for In-Gear Quickvit RT
50 miles – 1h 42m 22s – riding for In-Gear Quickvit RT

National Champion 2008

10 miles – 18m 07s – riding for In-Gear Quickvit RT
25 miles – 50m 49s – riding for In-Gear Quickvit RT
50 miles – 1h 40m 37s – riding for In-Gear Quickvit RT
British National Time Trial Championships – riding for In-Gear Quickvit RT

National Champion 2009

10 miles – 19m 34s – riding for In-Gear Quickvit RT
25 miles – 48m 23s – riding for In-Gear Quickvit RT
50 miles – 1h 43m 18s – riding for In-Gear Quickvit RT
100 miles – 3h 27m 26s – riding for In-Gear Quickvit RT

National Champion 2010

10 miles – 18m 37s – riding for In-Gear Quickvit Trainsharp RT
25 miles – 49m 34s – riding for In-Gear Quickvit Trainsharp RT
50 miles – 1h 38m 55s – riding for In-Gear Quickvit Trainsharp RT
100 miles – 3h 23m 04s – riding for In-Gear Quickvit Trainsharp RT

National Champion 2011

25 miles – 53m 36s – riding for In-Gear Quickvit Trainsharp RT
50 miles – 1h 41m 28s – riding for In-Gear Quickvit Trainsharp RT
100 miles – 3h 24m 45s – riding for In-Gear Quickvit Trainsharp RT

National Champion 2012

10 miles – 19m 40s – riding for In-Gear Quickvit Trainsharp RT
25 miles – 47m 01s – riding for In-Gear Quickvit Trainsharp RT
50 miles – 1h 40m 35s – riding for In-Gear Quickvit Trainsharp RT

National Champion 2013

10 miles – 19m 20s – riding for In-Gear Quickvit Trainsharp RT

National TT series

Winner 1999, 2001, 2002, 2004 and 2005

British Best All-rounder (BBAR) TT competition

BBAR Winner 2000 and 2005

Ron Kitching Trophy ('Champion of Champions')

Winner 2004, 2005, 2006, 2007, 2008, 2009, 2010, 2011, 2012

Irish National Time Trials Championships
National Champion 2012, 2013, 2014

Other titles, etc.

Commonwealth Games (riding for Northern Ireland)
2006 Melbourne
4th in the Individual Time Trial
2010 Delhi
4th in the Individual Time Trial
2014 Glasgow
12 in the Individual Time Trial

Brompton World Champion 2011, 2012 & 2013

== Records and personal bests ==
Competition records for TT
100 miles – 2003 – 3h 23m 33s (since broken)
50 miles – 2008 – 1h 35m 27s (since broken)
10 miles – 2010 – 17m 57s (since broken)
30 miles – 2011 – 55m 39s (since broken)
10 miles – 2012 – 17m 45s (since broken)
25 miles – 2012 – 45m 46s (since broken)

Personal bests
10 miles – 2012 – 17m 45s
25 miles – 2012 – 45m 46s
30 miles – 2011 – 55m 39s
50 miles – 2008 – 1h 35m 27s
100 miles – 2010 – 3h 23m 04s
12 hours – 2000 – 293.23mls

== Bibliography ==
- Hutchinson, M. (2006), The Hour, Yellow Jersey Press, ISBN 0-224-07519-5
- Hutchinson, M. (2008), Hello Sailor, Yellow Jersey Press, ISBN 0-224-07880-1
- Hutchinson, M. (2014), Faster - The Obsession, Science and Luck Behind the World's Fastest Cyclists, Bloomsbury, ISBN 9781408843758
- Hutchinson, M. (2017), Re:Cyclists - 200 Years on Two Wheels, Bloomsbury, ISBN 9781472925596
