= John Woodburn =

John Woodburn may refer to:

- Sir John Woodburn (civil servant) (1843–1902), British civil servant in India
- John Woodburn (cyclist) (1937–2017), British road and time-trial cyclist
- John Woodburn (footballer), Scottish footballer
