= Harry Earnshaw =

Harry Earnshaw may refer to:

- Harry Earnshaw (cyclist)
- Harry Earnshaw (trade unionist)
