= Willie Hume =

Irish racing cyclist

Personal information
- Full name: William Hume
- Nickname: Willie
- Born: 3 April 1862 Belfast, Ireland
- Died: 1941 (aged 78–79)

Cycling career
- Sport: Cycling

Amateur team
- 1889: Belfast Cruisers Cycling Club

Major wins
- 1889 – 4 out 4 victories in Belfast on world's first pneumatic tyres. 1889 – 3 out 4 victories in Liverpool on world's first pneumatic tyres.

William Hume (3 April 1862 – 1941) was an Irish cyclist. He demonstrated the efficiency of John Boyd Dunlop's newly invented pneumatic tyres in 1889, winning the tyre's first ever races in Ireland and then England.

== Career ==
In March 1889 Hume, the captain of the Belfast Cruisers Cycling Club, was the first member of the public to purchase a "safety bicycle" fitted with Dunlop's newly patented pneumatic tyres. Dunlop suggested that it would be advantageous to Hume to use them in a race. Thus on 18 May 1889 he won all four cycling events at the Queen's College Sports held on the North of Ireland Cricket Club Grounds, (or Queens College playing fields) at Cherryvale, Belfast.

Entrepreneur and paper manufacturer Harvey du Cros was present at the meet, and was so impressed that within six months he had acquired the patent rights (or in 1896) for £3,000 and floated the first Pneumatic Tyre Company.

Hume went on to be the person to introduce the new invention to England, when, in 1889, he raced on pneumatics in Liverpool, winning all but one of the cycling events.

Hume's achievements were celebrated in 1938 when Cycling Weekly, then known simply as Cycling awarded him his own page in the Golden Book of Cycling.

== Patent dispute ==
Dunlop's patent, which he had sold to Du Cros, was legally disputed. Two years after he was granted the patent Dunlop was officially informed that it was invalid as Scottish inventor Robert William Thomson (1822–1873) had patented the idea in France in 1846 and in the US in 1847. Dunlop's patent was later declared invalid on the basis of Thomson's prior art.
