= Dick Poole (cyclist) =

English cyclist

Personal information
- Full name: Richard William Ewart Poole
- Born: 1932 (age 93–94)

Cycling career
- Sport: Cycling
- Discipline: Road
- Role: Endurance Rider

Amateur teams
- Middlesex Road Club
- Farnborough & Camberley Cycling Club

Major wins
- 1965 – Land's End-John o' Groats, under 48 hours

Richard William Ewart Poole was the first man to cycle from Land's End to John o' Groats, the length of mainland Britain, in less than two days. He then beat the 1,000-mile record... only to find he was a few yards too short.

== Background ==
Born in Willesden, London, England in 1932, Poole was a talented time-triallist—a competitor against the clock over fixed distances—living in west London. He was a member of Middlesex Road Club. A meeting with another enthusiast, a model-maker and weekend cycling journalist called Bernard Thompson, led to a plan in 1965 to try for the longest place-to-place record in Britain: Land's End to John o' Groats.

Cyclists had been trying the ride since at least July 1880, when H Blackwell and C A Harman of the Canonbury Bicycle Club rode from Cornwall to Caithness in 13 days. The first formal attempt was by George Pilkington Mills, who rode a penny-farthing with a 52-inch wheel for 5d 1h 45m in July 1886, when he was 19. The Road Records Association formed two years later to formalise attempts. It ruled that riders were free to take whatever route they preferred provided they covered the distance. That proved critical in Poole's ride and in the challenge that ended his record.

== The record he won ==
Dick Poole set off from Land's End at 9:45 am on Wednesday, 16 June 1965 He was 31, married with a daughter, and worked full-time as an accountant. The record he was challenging was 2d 10m 40s, set by Reg Randall of the Harlequin cycling club in 1958. The timekeeper was Frank Fischer of the Kentish Wheelers.

Poole fell in road works at Cullompton and slid 10 minutes behind Randall when he got held up in traffic at Wellington. The pain of cuts on his hip from the fall cost him a further six minutes by Bristol, where Reg Randall helped direct his challenger through traffic. Night fell, rain fell, Poole's lights refused to stay lit. Poole was 42 minutes behind Randall at Wigan, after 365 miles but picked up speed along the main A6 highway.

He got lost in the streets of Lancaster before an observer from the Road Records Association found him and pointed him the right way. Poole finally moved ahead of Randall's time at Crawford, across the border into Scotland. Sporting Cyclist reported:

The run along the coast of Sutherland, prelude to the ascent of Helmsdale and the Ord of Caithness, revealed climbing that set the helpers talking about Charly Gaul! Dick rode Berridale, the toughest hill of a tough journey, without faltering. To attain his own schedule for the first time since Okehampton was a great reward for climbing of the highest order. He raced past the 'desert of telegraph poles' along the coast of Caithness and reached Wick (855 miles) with 10min in hand of the two-day schedule. Two more minutes were gained in the next three miles – and John o' Groats (871.7 miles) was reached in 1 day 23hr 46min 35sec.

== The record he missed ==
Poole was tired and reluctant to continue. But a further 128.3 miles (206.5 km) at 13 miles per hour (21 km/h) would bring him the 1,000-mile record, which Randall also held. "I was in the state you'd expect after the end-to-end", Poole said, "but they were saying I'd barely have to do it at club run speed So I agreed and I had a rest and I set off again."

The weather at John o' Groats was calm. Poole rode the first 15 miles at 20 mph and the first 30 at 17 mph. The weather turned to cold rain pushed by a high wind. Bernard Thompson, the organiser, allowed Poole to continue beyond the extra 128 miles as the timekeeper timed him through landmarks about every mile. By measuring the whole route afterwards, Fischer could calculate where Poole had passed 1,000 miles and at what time. At what Thompson considered a safe margin, 1,010 miles, Poole came to a halt. Fischer's unconfirmed time for 1,000 miles was 2d 8h 6m, which had beaten Randall's time by 2h 34m. The problem came when the course was measured. It showed that, despite the extra 10 miles measured on the odometer of the following car, Poole was a few yards short of the distance. Poole said:

We couldn't understand it. They measured it again and then the motoring organisations joined in and they measured it and still it came out short. And it was getting to be quite a story in the papers. It took a lot of puzzling to work out what had happened. We had based our attempt on the schedule that Reg Randall used. The route was clear except in Scotland, where there was a choice between going straight over a mountain, which was the shorter route, or round it, which was longer but meant he could ride faster.

We didn't know which way he'd gone but we assumed the shorter way, and that's the way I went. The over-the-mountain route was 10 miles and so many yards shorter and so I hadn't done 1,000 miles when we were all sure I'd ridden 1,010."

== The records broken ==
Poole's end-to-end record stood for 14 years before it fell to Paul Carbutt, a rider who rode everything from short hill-climb time-trials to Land's End to John o' Groats. He won national championships at 50 and 100 miles and 12 hours and won the British Best All-rounder competition for the highest average speeds over three races.

Bernard Thompson said: "Paul Carbutt is probably the one and only rider ever to have covered such a wide variety of unpaced distances with such success... Carbutt turned professional for a successful career which included the Land's End to John o' Groats record in 1d 23h 23m 1s, breaking Dick Poole's 14-year-old record by 23m 34s. In the process, Carbutt lost five minutes in Cornwall when police accused him of speeding. .

The writer Tim Hilton said:

Paul Carbutt broke Poole's record in 1980. There is one difference in their routes through Scotland: the Forth Road Bridge was built between the two attempts, meaning that Carbutt rode 13 fewer miles. On the other hand he was entangled with traffic on the way to the bridge and might have lost half an hour among the trucks and cars. Poole's time had not been much slower. In 1965 he had arrived at the John o' Groats Hotel at 9.46 am. Surely this proves that Poole's ride, all of 15 years before, had set a magnificent record.

The 1,000-mile record fell in September 2001 to Gethin Butler, a 33-year-old from Preston, who recorded 2d 7h 53m 7s having beaten the end-to-end record on the way in 1d 20hrs 4m 19s.

== Poole's ride ==
Sporting Cyclist reported that Poole wore four club jerseys, two pairs of shorts, two pairs of shoes, several pairs of socks, sweaters and a nylon anorak. He had quick halts for food but, as he was riding, got through 2 lb of fruit cake, 11 packets of malt bread sandwiches, one gallon of rice and fruit salad, seven pints of Complan, 12 oranges, cans of fruit, eight pints of coffee, 13 pints of tea and eight pints of Ribena.

His bicycles had gears of 102, 90, 84, 73, 72, 70, 62 and 59 inches. His Mercian frame had a head angle of 72 degrees and a seat angle of 73. He rode on 8oz tubulars He had handlebar controls for his gears, Mafac Racer brakes, Campagnolo hubs and a Stronglight chainset.

== Retirement ==
Poole became head coach of the Road Time Trials Council before its coaching scheme merged with that of the British Cycling Federation. He is now a coach at Reading track west of London and is President and Treasurer of the Farnborough and Camberley Cycling Club. Along with Aleck Hunter, he was instrumental in forming the British Triathlon Association after the first U.K. Triathlon had been organised in 1982 by health club owner and former Olympic pentathlete Mike Ellis along with David Wall, Peter Metalli and Maurice Hoare at a disused gravel pit at Kirton's Farm, Pingewood, Reading in 1982. Poole was BTA Chairman from 1983 to 1989. He now lives in Reading with his wife and has two daughters called Kate and Caroline and two grand-daughters, Gemma and Elysia.
