= Ilkley Cycling Club =

British community-based club in Ilkley

Ilkley Cycling Club is a community-based club that promotes cycling in the town of Ilkley, West Yorkshire, United Kingdom.

The club is affiliated to British Cycling and the Cycling Time Trials organisations, the Cyclist Touring Club, or CTC the national cycling charity as well as the Yorkshire Cycling Federation.

== Original club ==
Founded in 1896, the club was a thriving sports club straddling both world wars and reached a peak during the 1950s, when it was one of the largest cycling clubs in the region.

Towards the late 1950s, the club disbanded, largely due to the reduced popularity of cycling as more motor cars took to the roads.

== 21st century revival ==
In 2011, a group of local cyclists led by Paul O'Looney, decided to resurrect the club and called a public meeting on 27 March 2011 at The Yard public house. Over 85 people turned up for the meeting, a constitution was created and agreed, with the aims being:

- To promote cycling to the people of Ilkley (and surrounding areas) and to those who cycle in or near our town
- To provide an avenue for club members to race and compete by having affiliations to governing bodies (British Cycling, Cycling Time Trials, MTB, cyclocross etc.)
- To provide a focus for recreational cyclists and promote the sport at grassroots level.
- To be open to all, and to encourage cycling for everyone.

A committee was duly elected and the club was born. The first ride took place on Thursday 5 May 2011, when over 100 riders took part.

The club has a junior section, funded by Sport England, and has a senior race team as well as social rides.

During 2013, the club membership increased to more than 1,000, and featured in articles of many local newspapers.

The White Rose Classic is a large Sportive ride in the June of each year that the club organises. A range of other competitive events are organised, including Cyclocross and time-trials.
