= Ernest J. Capell =

English cyclist

Ernest James "Tubby" Capell (July 1912 – April 1995) was an English amateur cyclist who in 1934 won the British Best All-Rounder competition, by dominating all of the qualifying events - 50 mile, 100 mile and 12 hours. His achievements were further celebrated in 1935 when Cycling Weekly awarded him his own page in the Golden Book of Cycling.

== Personal life ==
Capell was born in July 1912 in London, England. He married Dora Fenwick in March 1940 and died in Australia in April 1995 at the age of 82.

== Career ==
=== Competition ===
In 1934 Capell won the British Best All-Rounder competition, by dominating all of the qualifying distances - 50 mile, 100 mile and 12 hours. In the 'Shaftesbury' 50 mile Time trial he won with a time of 2 hours, 9 minutes, 59 seconds. He won the 'Bath Road' "100 mile time-trial in 4 hours, 32 minutes, 1 second." Finally he won the Anerley 12-hour race by covering 236¾ miles. He later described his simplistic feeding regime for the Anerley as "... half to three-quarter-pint drink of a milk food at about every 30 miles for the first 150 miles, and at every 20 miles from there to the finish, with a small sandwich of brown bread and a meat extract at every alternate drink."

=== The Golden Book ===
Capell's achievements were celebrated in 1935 when Cycling Weekly awarded him his own page in the Golden Book of Cycling.

=== Cycle touring ===
Capell was also a photographer. Many of his photographs appeared in English cycling magazines during the 1930s and 1940s.
