= Roy Cromack =

English cyclist (1940–2017)

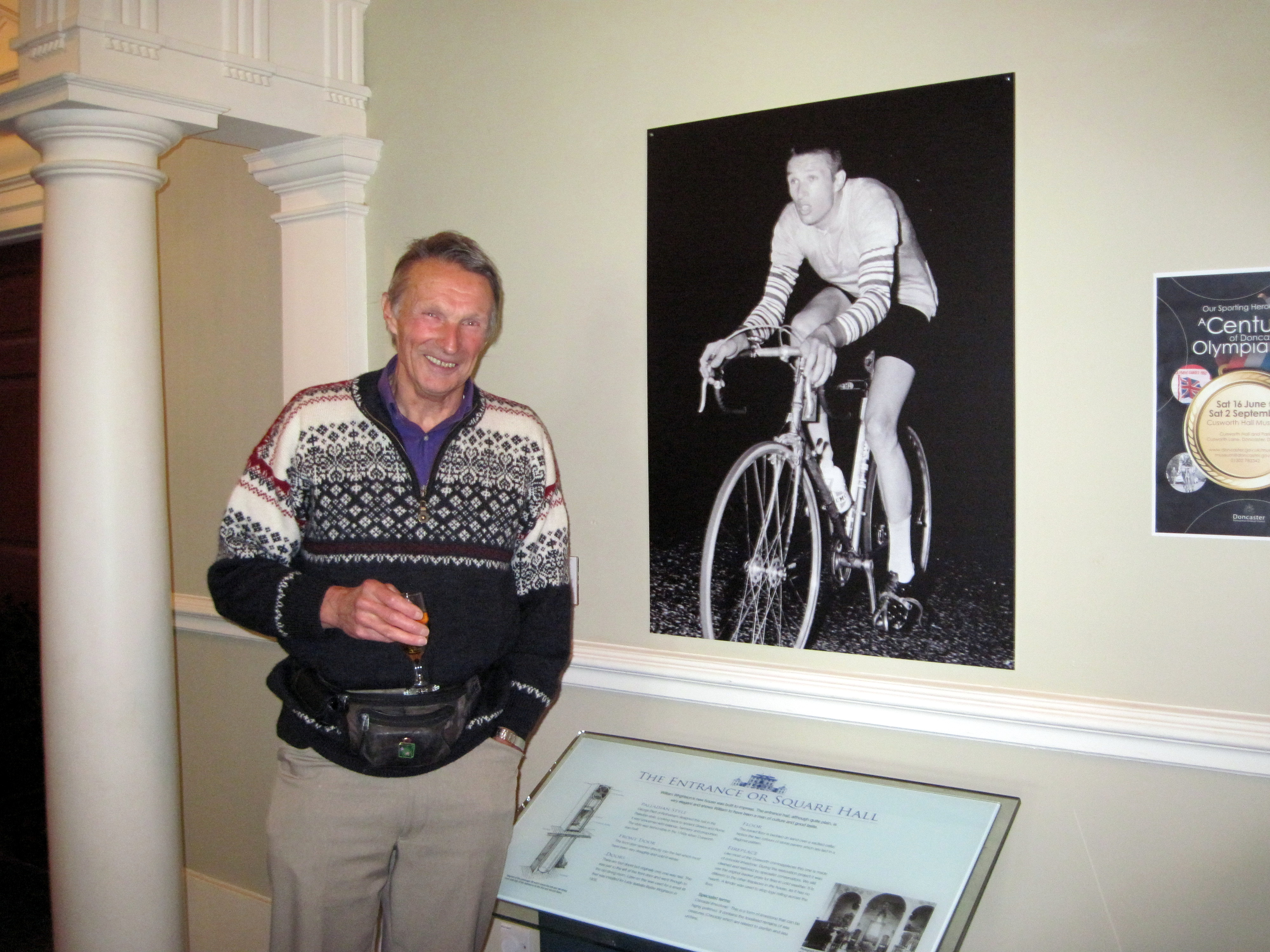

Personal information
- Born: 18 February 1940 Doncaster, England
- Died: 10 November 2017 (aged 77)

Cycling career
- Sport: Cycling

Roy Cromack (18 February 1940 – 10 November 2017) was a racing cyclist who represented Britain in track races and in international road races such as the Peace Race. He was the first British cyclist to ride more than 500 miles in a 24-hour time trial. He was educated at the Percy Jackson Grammar School and Sheffield University (Maths, Physics).

== 500 miles ==
Cromack rode 507 miles in the Road Time Trials Council national 24-hour championship in July 1969. It was his first ride at the distance and the first time 500 miles had been bettered. The record stood for 28 years. He beat the second rider, Eric Matthews, by 15 miles.

Cromack was a rare all-rounder, winning championship medals from 4,000 metres on the track to 24 hours on the road. He won medals at every distance in British time-trialling championships and was one of the four-man team in the road race for Britain at the Olympic Games in Mexico where they came in 11th. He has an entry in the Golden Book of Cycling.

On Saturday 16 June 2012, there was a preview of a week-long exhibition to be held at Cusworth Hall Museum, Doncaster. This was in celebration of Doncaster's sports men and women who took part in different sports at previous Olympic Games. Some of their memorabilia was on show in individual glass display cases. The Lord Mayor of Doncaster, Mr Peter Davies as well as Roy Cromack, one of the Olympic Team Cyclists of the 1968 Mexico Games, was in attendance.
