= Cyril Heppleston =

English cyclist

Cyril Heppleston (11 November 1912 – 18 September 1966) was an English cyclist from Bradford who broke the 100-mile, 200-mile and 12-hour competition records in 1937, and was the only man to beat 250 miles in 12 hours in open competition. He was regarded as 'among the greatest English unpaced time-trial riders.

Heppleston won the Best All-Rounder competition for 1937 with the record average of 22.348mph. His achievements were celebrated in 1938 when Cycling Weekly awarded him a page in the Golden Book of Cycling.

== Career ==
Heppleston was born in Bradford, Yorkshire in 1912 and worked as an electrical engineer. At 19, he joined Bradford Victoria CC and the following year moved to the Yorkshire Road Club. In 1934 he won his first open event and finished 55th in the 'Best All-rounder' Competition. In 1935, he came 23rd. In 1936 he was the only man to exceed 250 miles in 12 hours in open competition on the road.

In 1937, Heppleston broke the 100-mile, 200-mile and 12-hour records and was again the only man to exceed 250 miles in 12 hours in open competition on the road. He won the Best All-Rounder competition with the record average of 22.348mph: 50 miles in 2h 7m 29s; 100m in 4h 26m 9s, and 12 hours - 251 5/8 miles. Heppleston's world record 24-hours ride of 478 1/2 miles survived until Hubert Opperman beat it in Melbourne on 5 December 1939.

In 1939, as a professional for Hercules, he took 16 minutes off the Edinburgh-London record, riding on a diet that included a soup with raw eggs.

== Golden Book ==
Cyril Heppleston's achievements were celebrated in 1937 when Cycling Weekly awarded him a page in the Golden Book of Cycling, now held in The Pedal Club archive.
