= Stanley Miles =

Stanley Walter Miles, Stan Miles, (3 September 1913 – August 2004) was an English amateur cyclist who won the British Best All-Rounder competition in 1935 whilst also leading his club, 'Century Road' C.C., to the title of 'Best All-rounder' team in Great Britain.

His victory tally in 1935 included winning the Anerley '12' hour; the Brighton Mitre '50' mile; the Highgate '100' mile; and the Ealing '50' miles.

His achievements were further celebrated in 1936 when Cycling Weekly awarded him his own page in the Golden Book of Cycling.

== Personal life ==
Miles lived in St Albans, Hertfordshire, where he ran a cycle shop in Victoria Street and customised both road and track frames.

== Career ==
Throughout 1935 Miles competed in 15 events, winning four and finishing third seven times. His victory tally included: the Anerley '12' hour with a record distance of 239¼ miles; the Brighton Mitre '50' mile in 2 hours, 7 minutes 3 seconds; the Highgate '100' mile in 4 hours 34 minutes 25 seconds; and the Ealing '50' miles in 2 hours 7 minutes 3 seconds.

These achievements meant that he won the title of Best All-rounder with an average speed of 21.809 mph, the second fastest ever achieved at that time.

== The Golden Book ==
Stan Miles's achievements were celebrated in 1936 when Cycling Weekly awarded him his own page in the Golden Book of Cycling.
