= Gary Dighton =

British cyclist (1968–2015)

Personal information
- Full name: Gary John Dighton
- Born: 18 May 1968 Whittlesey, Cambridgeshire, England
- Died: 9 January 2015 (aged 46) Poole, England
- Height: 6 ft 3 in (191 cm)

Cycling career
- Sport: Cycling
- Rider type: Time Trialist

Professional teams
- 1990–199?: Manchester Wheelers Trumans Steel
- 199?–1999: Leo Road Club Shorter Rochford

Gary John Dighton (18 May 1968 – 9 January 2015) was a British cyclist. He competed in the team time trial at the 1992 Summer Olympics. Dighton won the British Best All-Rounder championship in 1990 and broke the competition record for the 25-mile time trial in 1991 with a time of 48.07. The same year he rode to victory in the National 100 mile TT championship.

== Death ==
Gary Dighton was living near Wareham, Dorset, when he took his own life in early January 2015, at the age of 46. He is said to have been suffering from bouts of depression for some years.
