= Charles Holland (cyclist) =

British cyclist

Personal information
- Full name: Charles Holland
- Born: 20 September 1908 Aldridge, England, United Kingdom
- Died: 15 December 1989 (aged 81)

Cycling career
- Sport: Cycling
- Disciplines: Road and track
- Role: Rider

Amateur team
- 1928–1937: Midland Cycling and Athletic Club

Professional team
- 1937–1939: Raleigh-Sturmey Archer

Major wins
- 1936– British Best All-Rounder (BBAR) time-trial
Medal record
Men's track cycling
Representing Great Britain
Olympic Games
Bronze medal – third place	1932 Los Angeles	Team pursuit

Charles Holland (20 September 1908 – 15 December 1989) was a British road bicycle racer. He was one of the first two Britons to ride the Tour de France.

== The early years ==
Holland was one of four brothers from Aldridge, in the English Midlands, a brown-eyed, black-haired man who excelled at sport from his youth. He played cricket for a local side which included Dr. V. E. Milne, who also played cricket for Scotland and football for Aston Villa. Holland hoped to play cricket for Warwickshire and he had a soccer trial for Aston Villa.

His father belonged to Walsall Polytechnic Cycling Club, and held the Walsall–Matlock record. Holland's first bike was a 24in-wheel bicycle his father bought for his eldest brother, Walter, and which was handed down the family when it became too small. At 12 he went on his first cycle tour, to the Liverpool area, with his father. In 1927 he rode his first race, the Wyndham Novices 25-mile individual time trial. Using his brother Walter's bike, he came second in 1h 10min. His first victory was on 1 April 1928 in the Walsall Roads Club 10-mile event.

That year, Holland joined the Midland Cycling and Athletic Club. He tried track racing, but with less success than on the road. Riding a bicycle with a fixed wheel and no brakes is difficult but to do it shoulder-to-shoulder with other riders and on a curved grass track proved defying. He rode a sports day run by Metropolitan Carriage Works of Birmingham around a cricket ground in Washwood Heath. Everyone passed him in his first event, a handicap, and then again in the half-mile as those he passed in the straight raced by on the bends, where Holland couldn't control his bike sufficiently.

== Olympic Games: Los Angeles 1932 ==
The road race at Los Angeles was the last to be held as a time trial, a lone race against the watch over 100 km. For Britain, which since the 19th century had had nothing but timed races on the road, that made selection simpler. On the other hand, the British Olympic Committee decided, because of the cost of getting to Los Angeles that "no competitor who is unlikely to reach the semi-final or final of his event shall be taken... and that only the absolutely necessary officials shall be taken".

Holland was picked to ride with Frank Southall, Bill Harvell, Stan Butler and Ernie Johnson. They sailed from Southampton aboard the Empress of Britain.

Amid scenes of wild enthusiasm the team of seven cyclists left Waterloo for the first stage of their epic journey. The crowds, the mountains of luggage, the three big crates containing the machines, the hissing steam and the shrieking whistles, the bubbling joviality, all blended into one big picture that will be for ever memorable.

The winner of the road race was Attilo Pavesi of Italy. Southall finished sixth, Holland 15th, Butler 16th, Harvell 19th. The Great Britain team came fourth overall. Butler did not ride because he had fallen on tram lines during a stop in Toronto and been hit by a car.

Holland was also picked to ride on the track, in the team pursuit with Southall, Harvell and Johnson. The Italians - Marco Cimatti, Paolo Pedretti, Alberto Ghilardi and Nino Borsari - won again, with 4min 53sec, having set an Olympic record of 4min 52.9sec in the heats. France was second in 4min 55.7sec. and Britain third in 4min 56sec.

== World championship ==
Holland was selected to ride the world championship road race at Leipzig in 1934, to ride with Percy Stallard and Fred Ghilks. Their accompanying official from the National Cyclists' Union was from Herne Hill velodrome in south London and knew little of road-racing.

The circuit was nearly six miles round, to be covered 12 times. The marshalling was by Brownshirts. The race averaged 26 mph with one lap at nearly 30. Holland rode 60 of the 70 miles with three broken spokes. The rim of his wheel touched the forks on both sides. He could not stop and ask for help because "in those far-off days - no service vehicle. If you punctured, you changed it yourself. If you crashed or copped fourpenny one [another expression for a crash], then you got on with it!" said the cycling historian Chas Messenger. Despite that, he got into the winning break on lap six. They approached the finish two minutes ahead, with Holland in fourth place behind Kees Pellenaars of the Netherlands, the Frenchman André Deforge and the Belgian Paul André.

The others had derailleur gears for a higher ratio for the sprint. Holland had a single 81-inch freewheel, meaning he had no variable gears and that he had to pedal faster than he could manage to stay with the others. He eased back 20 metres before the line and came fourth. Stallard and Ghilks didn't finish for another two minutes, Stallard seventh and Ghilks 26th.

Cycling said of Holland's ride:

Class told, and this country's face was saved, to an extent by the fact that the England selectors had in one case out of the four selections, ignored the Brooklands' [selection race] results and chosen a man whom, all the country had known for two years, had the class necessary to remain with the leaders.

== Olympic Games: Berlin 1936 ==
Holland rode the 1936 Summer Olympics in Berlin, selected for the 100 km road race and as reserve for the 4,000m team pursuit. Cycling was unimpressed by the team: "If these are our best men then they are unlikely to bring back any Olympic titles from Germany."

Holland did not win a medal but he believed it would have been different had his younger brothers, Alf and Jack, been chosen to ride with him. Alf was a reserve; Jack was the 25-mile national champion.

The 1936 Games were the so-called Hitler Olympics. Unlike most other Olympic Games to date, where the political aspects were subtle and nuanced, the Berlin Games were explicitly politicised.

The road race on the morning of August 8 began at the Avus car course, a circuit laid out on public roads to test cars. It then used a straight dual-carriageway through Berlin, a little over 12 miles long. From there the course crossed the narrow roads of the Forest of Grunewald before returning to the car track to finish. It was the first Olympic road race to be run with all the competitors starting together, rather than individually and at intervals against the watch. Sixty riders led at 81 km and fewer than 30 at 91 km, not because of hills or the speed - which was low - but because of narrow roads, punctures and crashes. Holland reached the finish and started the sprint for the finish 100m from the line. He finished less than a second behind the winner, Robert Charpentier of France, but outside the first three.

Guy Lapébie of France came second - discovering months later from the film of the finish that Charpentier had grabbed his jersey and tugged him back - and then Ernst Nievergelt from Switzerland. Holland finished fifth. His club magazine reported:

It must have been a nightmare kind of event and one in which only the strongest combinations could have kept a rider in the front bunch. Charlie could not gather his compatriots round him and from what we can understand he had to fight his way, elbowing, jostling and pushing to occupy a front position in that fierce affair. Very many riders came to grief, a happening that overtook most of the other British representatives; but Charles sailed through barging and bucking into the excited crowd and actually leading the field a few hundred yards from the finishing tape.

From a story recounted in the magazine of the Fellowship of Cycling Old-Timers:

During one of our long conversations while Phil, his lovely wife, prepared tea, Charlie (she always called him Charles) recalled an incident while training for the Berlin Olympics. He was out in the countryside and stopped for a rest, to look around, on a bridge that passed over a newly constructed autobahn. Below him in the distance he could see a mass of vehicles coming down the new super highway, constructed of concrete, with the swastika flags fluttering from the wings of the massive Mercedes as they convoyed towards the stadium. Seated in one of the open Mercs was the well-known figure of one Adolf Hitler. As Charlie said, he could have prevented World War II by simply dropping a bomb in Hitler's lap.

Holland regarded 1936 as the peak of his career. As well as the Olympics, he travelled to the Isle of Man to win the first massed-start road-race over the island's 37-mile Snaefell mountain course, on 18 June 1936. In a sprint finish to what was effectively the first Manx International road race, Holland beat Bill Messer (Marlboro AC) by a length with the Scot Jackie Bone third, the lap covered in 1 hour 42 minutes and 59 seconds, a speed of 22 mph.

== The British Best All-Rounder ==
1936 culminated in Holland winning the British Best All-Rounder (BBAR) time-trial competition. The contest is based on speeds over 50 and 100 miles and for 12 hours. Holland was the first to average more than 22 mph. He had been third in 1933 and second in 1934 and 1935.

Bill Mills, editor of The Bicycle, described him as:

The best all-rounder, not in its narrow sense of best average in certain particular road events, but in its real sense of best at all types of cycling. Holland's record for the year includes successes at almost every possible type of racing: time trials, massed-starts, track racing, in fact the full programme in which every clubman likes to indulge. The specialist 'pot hunter' may confine himself to his little round of events at distances that he finds brings in the rewards, but the real clubman runs through the gamut of events, taking pleasure, if not prizes, in all and sundry. Of such a type is the dusky Midlander, taking all the sport can offer in his stride.

=== The Golden Book ===
Charles Holland's achievements were celebrated in 1937 when Cycling Weekly awarded him his own page in the Golden Book of Cycling.

== Six-day track race and Tour de France ==
Holland turned professional in April 1937, 10 years after his first race. His first event was an 'Empire versus Foreigners' meeting at Herne Hill in south London. There should have been numerous races but Holland rode only two, a sprint which he lost and a team pursuit in which so many riders punctured that both teams had only one rider left in the race. Rain then ended the day.

Holland's objective was to ride the six-day race to be held on a velodrome constructed inside the Empire Pool, Wembley, in north London. He went to Belgium to train on the track at Liège. He was paired in the six-day with the Belgian, Roger Deneef, and what Holland described as a misunderstanding on how each should relay the other into the race led to Holland crashing several times in the first hours. On the second day, he crashed again, broke a collar bone and dropped out. A curiosity of the race was that the leading German rider, Toni Merkens, competed in a jersey bearing a large swastika, a hint at the future that went unnoticed at the time."

Holland broke the same collar bone in June when he tripped on a rabbit hole and had to miss riding with Continental stars on the motor-racing circuit at Crystal Palace, south London. That same year he entered the Tour de France, although the bone breaks had limited his training. In those days it was still possible to enter as an individual, although most places were saved for teams invited by the organiser, Henri Desgrange or his successor, Jacques Goddet, for whom 1937 was his first complete Tour de France as organiser. (Note: Henri Desgrange had fallen ill and left the 1936 Tour de France. Jacques Goddet took over after Charleville and ran the whole 1937 Tour de France. The most noticeable change under his direction was that riders were allowed to use derailleur gears for the first time.) Holland said:

My interest came from the number of riders I'd met who'd ridden it, and I felt that if they could do it then so could I. I had the best massed-start experience of any rider in the country because I'd won races such as the one in the Isle of Man, which was pretty tough because of its mountainous nature. They seemed very pleased to get my entry, the Tour de France. They thought I wouldn't stand it, that only a real professional could do it. I sent off my entry and I got a very good reply and they offered me this and that so I agreed. The costs were all met by the French people, the organisers of the Tour de France.

— Charles Holland, 1986?

Two weeks before the race Holland read in Desgrange's newspaper, L'Auto, that he and another British entrant, Bill Burl, would not after all compete. With the help of staff at Cycling's office in Birmingham, he sent a telegram to Desgrange for clarification. Next day Desgrange replied: "Following your wire dated yesterday agree engagement if you agree yours - L'Auto." The condition was that Holland, Burl and a French-Canadian called Pierre Gachon should combine in a British Empire team.

Holland, Burl, Gachon and the other competitors were greeted at the start by the Franco-American dancer Josephine Baker and they left Paris wearing a Union Jack on their jerseys. Neither Holland nor Burl had met Gachon before the start and Holland was not impressed. "I think I'd have to think twice about [his] riding a second-class British event", he said. Gachon dropped out during the first day. Burl broke his collar bone when he was knocked off of his bike by an over enthusiastic photographer on the second day. He was forced to retire. Holland rode 2,000 miles until a broken pump stranded him on the day to Luchon. He punctured behind the leaders on the Col de Port, fitted a new tyre and found the heat had warped the washer of his pump. He got the tyre to half-pressure but punctured twice more and ran out of tyres.

A crowd of peasants had gathered around me but they couldn't help me. A priest brought me a bottle of beer, and although it quenched my thirst it got me no further. After I had given up hope, a tourist came along and gave me a tubular touring tyre. I put it on, and in the excitement of the moment the rod of the pump broke. We blew the tyre hard with another pump but the tyre fitted so loosely on the rim that it came off with the fingers and so was unsafe. Another tyre was found that fitted a little better, and again I set off, but I had by then given up hope.

— Charles Holland, 1937?

Holland didn't take the experience lightly.

My riding in the Tour de France was a big disappointment to me because I felt I'd never been extended. I had a lot left in reserve. I didn't expect to win because we didn't have a team and I didn't have a manager. It seemed that they wanted me out of the race. They didn't give me a fair deal. You need a manager for a race like that, someone who can hand up your rations and your drinks, which you get through a lot of. But to have an organisation for one man wasn't in their thinking. They thought that nobody could ride without a manager. So they got all the publicity they could out of me but they wanted me out because what would people think if an individual rider with no support finished their race?

— Charles Holland, circa 1986?

Of the 98 starters, 46 reached Paris. Among other riders to abandon were the race leader Sylvère Maes of Belgium and all his team, in protest against a judging decision.

== Public reaction ==
Holland and Burl had become the first British competitors in the Tour and Gachon the first Canadian. Since he was in the race far longer, it was who Holland attracted much affection among French fans, one of whom wrote from Lacelle in the Corrèze region:

My dear Holland, I am a French girl who likes very much her bicycle and who is very fond of « Tour de France ». So, I read « L'Auto » and I listen to « Radio-Luxembourg ». I have been very pleased to learn we would have an English « équipe » this year. First, I congratulate you for this: to run the « Tour de France » because I know it is not very important in England, your people prefers tennis, golf and so on, and however not one other competition permits as well as this, to measure courage. I think you have come with your own will and I say it is very well indeed. Unhappily, your friends have no had luck, and it is very bad for you too, because it must be so hard to stay alone, in a so hard performance. So I admire your « war » and all my best thoughts on the « Tour de France » are for you. Don't be sorry if you are not the first, it is impossible when one is alone.

Cycling wrote:

So far as this country is concerned the race this year has had one outstanding justification; it has shown us the courage and the splendid riding ability of one of our own men, Charles Holland, and we can take pride in his glorious failure knowing that alone as he was, a complete stranger in his surroundings, the victor's laurels could never have been his had he been the greatest stayer, the fastest sprinter and the finest roadmen in the race. Holland is the product of his own determination to be the best Englishman at that class of riding. That he kept in the Tour for three-quarters of the distance, and was only them forced to abandon through ill luck demonstrates that no matter what the sphere of competitive cycling we have ambitions to contest, men can be developed, if we have the will, who can again rank with the world's best.

The rival paper, The Bicycle wrote:

"Goodbye, Holland. Do not be discouraged by your bad luck. You are the man of the Tour."

In the organising paper, L'Auto, Robert Perrier wrote:

Charles Holland did not arrive on the avenues of Etigny. We will no longer see his fine youthful silhouette on the road. We will no longer see his modest smile and his mischievous glances. We will no longer hear his reflections drawn from the source of the best humour of his country. Tomorrow we will give him the pyjamas he threw in our car after Lille along with his toothbrush and toothpaste which he never reclaimed. Charles Holland has abandoned the Tour without a fuss, with pride.

Outside specialist cycling interests, however, interest in the Tour and its first two British riders was minimal. The academics Hugh Dauncey and Geoff Hare wrote in their analysis of the absence of both British interest and marked success in the Tour de France since its start:

Coverage of the Tour by The Times, the newspaper of reference, teaches us much about English attitudes. In 1937, for instance, when Holland and Burl abandoned without The Times deigning to mention their suffering, two brief comments on the race were 'Discordant cycle race: pepper thrown at Belgian team' and a half-hearted announcement, as though only the people concerned might be interested: 'France wins Tour de France'. (Note: It was the perceived unevenness of penalties handed out by officials during the 1937 Tour de France that led to the walk-out by Sylvère Maes, the race leader, and the rest of the Belgian team.)

Later Dauncey and Hare write:

Nobody (in France at least) remembers the amateurs Charles Holland and Bill Burl, who both had to drop out, physically exhausted, certainly, but above all stunned by the misery to which they had so innocently [ imprudemment] committed themselves. For Holland, the apparent variability with which the rules were applied was more discouraging than the mountain passes and the distances.

== Road records ==
1938 was the year Holland attempted professional place-to-place records on the road, at that time the only way that a professional rider could publicise his sponsor, there still being no massed racing on the road and professionals not being allowed to ride amateur time-trials. In June, riding for Raleigh/Sturmey-Archer, Holland broke his first Road Records Association (RRA) record, knocking 12 minutes off the time of his rival, Frank Southall, for Liverpool to Edinburgh, completing the 210 miles in 10 hours.

In August he narrowly beat the record for Land's End to London but it was not accepted as a new RRA record because it did not improve on the old one by more than a minute. Two months later, he completed the 287 miles from Land's End to London again, racing at 21 mph through hours of rain and suffering four punctures but, knocking 25 minutes off the record.

Holland's professional career ended when Britain declared war on Germany in 1939. He was called up to join the Royal Corps of Signals.

== Physiology ==
In 1936, Holland was examined by Sir Adolphe Abrahams, the medical officer of the British Olympic athletic team, for the magazine Cycling. Abrahams observed:

Charles Holland's... thigh is relatively long... In all great cyclists we confidently expect a muscular thigh, not, perhaps, to the extent of the short-distance runner, in whom violent explosive efforts are demanded, but still a conspicuous development. In Holland's case, the maximum circumference falls below that of the others, but the character of the development is particularly fine, the prominence of the muscle bellies demarcating the components of the great mass on the front of the thigh, affording a picture with which we are all familiar as the athletic ideal.

And when we examine Holland's calf muscles, the appearance is still more striking. These muscles have a better development than any of his predecessors, with the exception of Frank Southall... A curious anomaly was a considerable difference in [Holland's] two calves; the left is fully half an inch larger in circumference. This, I presume, is due to some peculiarity of action; a tiny asymmetry in movements of the ankles would eventually account for this difference.

He measured Holland's chest expansion as 3½ inches - "the average we expect in a racing cyclist" - and his heart rate at 52 to 54.

== Post-war life ==
Holland was too old to race again as a professional when the war ended and rules at the time did not allow him to race as an amateur again. He took up golf and occasionally played in pro-am tournaments. He moved to Carter Road at Great Barr, a suburb of Birmingham and opened a newsagent's shop in Newton Road, Great Barr which he ran, and another at Sheldon, on the other side of the city, which was managed by his brother Alf. He set up the shops with money saved in his years as a professional.

He never lost interest in cycling and occasionally watched racing in Sutton Park, Birmingham, where he was rarely recognised as one of Britain's first two starters in the Tour de France. In the 1960s cycling began allowing former professionals to ride in amateur races and Holland made a comeback despite being overweight and a heavy smoker. He won the Veterans Time Trial Association best all-rounder title in 1974. In 1975, aged 67, he returned to the Isle of Man to win the veterans' road race, riding roads he first raced over 39 years earlier. He repeated his veterans all-rounder victory, breaking age records at 25, 50 and 100 miles and for 12 hours. His 100-mile time beat the age standard by one-and-a-half hours.

He died in December 1989 and is buried in the family grave at Aldridge. His great nephews Tom Holland and James Holland are both leading historians and media personalities.

== Discovery of records ==
Holland's daughters, Nina and Frances, say they grew up seeing their father's cups around the houses but had little idea of their significance. Frances said:

How famous our dad had been was brought home to us in 1962; I was 11 years old when we went with him to the Royal Albert Hall (British Best All-Rounder dinner and awards) where he was invited to tell the Story of the Yellow Jersey.

She and her sister sat in the royal box and watched a show starring the comedian Tommy Trinder, Tour de France winner Louison Bobet, Tour organiser Jacques Goddet and Brian Robinson, in 1958 the first British rider to win a stage of the Tour. Not for nearly half a century did they know that in the loft of their house they had a suitcase in which their father had kept his medals, photographs, and newspaper articles. There too were his Olympic and Tour de France jerseys, his racing caps, notes and correspondence from fans. Frances, a teacher, began writing a biography, Dancing Uphill, and Nina, a book publisher, published it.

== Significance ==
Holland's significance is that he and Bill Burl were the first Britons to ride the Tour de France. Holland's contribution was the greater because Burl lasted only two days. Holland and Burl are also the only Britons to have ridden as private entrants, something that was possible until the outbreak of the second world war but not afterwards.

It is impossible to say whether Holland would have finished the Tour or, if he had, in what position. He was considered a novelty by organisers and the spectators, who knew nothing of cycling in Britain, and that led to his being adopted by the French team. The French called him Sir Holland and helped with advice, accommodation and food. But the first interests of French officials was always going to be with their own riders, which explains Holland's isolation when his pump broke and he ran out of tyres.

No British rider competed in or finished the Tour de France until 1955. In that year, Brian Robinson came 29th and Tony Hoar last, the only two of the team to reach Paris. Robinson described their experience as "racing cars competing against Concorde."

There is little direct link between Holland and Robinson, although Holland's private entry is the more remarkable because it went against the fashion of the day. The National Cyclists' Union, which ran the sport in Britain, had opposed racing on the road since the 19th century, afraid that the police would intervene and that all cycling could be banned as a result. The position of cyclists on the road had not been established. The NCU had no interest in road racing and still less in the Tour de France. The magazine, Cycling, which had an influence stronger than at any time since, followed the NCU's line and barely covered the Tour.

The link between Holland and Robinson is further broken by the war, when the Tour de France was suspended, and by an administrative civil war that broke out in Britain at the same time. Frustrated by the NCU's ban on road racing, a group of enthusiasts led by Percy Stallard, formed the British League of Racing Cyclists (BLRC). The BLRC wanted nothing more than to put a team in the Tour de France but couldn't because only the NCU was recognised internationally. The battle between NCU and BLRC exhausted both bodies and only in their last years did both allow racing on the roads. It was that that led to a team being selected in 1955 and Robinson's becoming the first Briton to finish.

== See also ==
- 1937 Tour de France
