= Harry Earnshaw (cyclist) =

English cyclist

Personal information
- Full name: Harold Earnshaw
- Nickname: Shake
- Born: 24 September 1915 Newmillerdam, Wakefield
- Died: 16 May 1985 (aged 69)

Cycling career
- Sport: Cycling
- Current team: Retired
- Discipline: Road - Endurance rider
- Role: Rider

Amateur team
- 1935: Monckton CC

Major wins
- 1936 – British Best All-Rounder Team Prize – Monckton C.C. 1937 – British Best All-Rounder Team Prize - Monckton C.C. 1938 – British Best All-Rounder; 1938 – Westerley 100-mile 1938 – 50-miles in 2 hours 4 minutes 21 seconds 1938 – 249 miles in 12 hours. 1939 – 276.5 miles in 12 hours.

Harold "Shake" Earnshaw (24 September 1915 – 16 May 1985) was an English racing cyclist from Yorkshire. In 1938 he was acclaimed as the British Best All-Rounder when his three best event performances were aggregated into 399 miles at 22.627 mph.

His achievements were celebrated in 1939 when Cycling Weekly awarded him his own page in the Golden Book of Cycling, which is now held in The Pedal Club archive.

== Personal life ==
Harry Earnshaw lived in Royston, South Yorkshire and was a natural athlete and cyclist. He worked as a coal miner from school-leaving age (c.1930) until 1938.

Earnshaw was given the nickname "Shake" by an uncle who saw a cartoon showing a sergeant-major shouting at a new recruit: "Before you come on parade tomorrow, Shakespeare get your hair cut." Turning to the young Harry, who had a thick crop of dark hair, the uncle repeated "Shakespeare, get your hair cut". This was adopted as his nickname; Shakespeare was shortened to "Shake", a nickname that stayed with him all his life.

== Career ==
Earnshaw started road racing in 1935 when he was 18 years old, winning his first event, 25-miles in 1 hour 18 minutes despite several delays, a fall and mechanical damage. He was renowned as a tough, resilient, uncomplaining rider, coping with mechanical and physical set-backs.

In 1936 the Monckton Cycling Club, sponsored by Carlton Cycles of Worksop, won the team section of the British Best All-Rounder and Earnshaw was fifth in the individual listing.

In the 1937 British Best All-Rounder, Earnshaw improved to third overall whilst Monckton C.C. again won the team prize. He also won the Sheffield Phoenix 25 mile Time Trial in 1 hour, 1 minute 46 seconds.

In 1938 Earnshaw won the British Best All-Rounder with the record average speed of 22.627 mph. This was reward for his victory in the Westerley 100-mile competition in a record time of 4 hours 20 minutes 48 seconds, plus two seasons best performances of 50-miles in 2 hours 4 minutes 21 seconds and 249 miles in 12 hours.

== The Golden Book ==
Earnshaw's achievements were celebrated in 1938 when Cycling Weekly awarded him his own page in the Golden Book of Cycling.

== Later years ==
In his senior years he became an after dinner speaker. He suffered from poor circulation in his legs, which necessitated multiple amputations, meaning Earnshaw needed to use a wheelchair.

Earnshaw died on Thursday, 16 May 1985 aged 69.
