= Paul Carbutt =

English cyclist (1950–2004)

Personal information
- Full name: Paul Anthony Carbutt
- Born: 4 July 1950 Birmingham, England
- Died: 1 May 2004 (aged 53)

Cycling career
- Sport: Cycling
- Discipline: Road
- Role: Rider

Professional teams
- 1978–1979: Viking-Campagnolo
- 1980: Man VW-Viking
- 1981: Sugino-Harry Quinn
- 1982: Itera-Falcon

Major wins
- Yorkshire Classic

Paul Anthony Carbutt (4 July 1950 – 1 May 2004) was an English professional racing cyclist. Carbutt has an exceptional range of achievements - from a silver medal in the short-distance national hill-climb championship in 1975 to breaking the near-1,000 miles of the Land's End to John o' Groats road record in 1979. He was an accomplished road rider and time triallist.

== Amateur career ==
Carbutt rode for the Midlands-based Saracen Road Club early in his career. His programme mixed the top road races with a range of time trial distances. He came to national prominence with a stage win and second overall in the 1974 Girvan 3-day stage race. In the same season he won the 100-mile time trial championship.

In 1975 he won a bronze medal in the national road race championship and won both the 50-mile and 12-hour time trial championships. His time trialling led to selection for the British team for the team time trial at the Montreal Olympics. The team came sixth, 50 seconds away from a bronze medal.

He competed in the team time trial event at the 1976 Summer Olympics.

In 1977 he rode for the GS Strada team. He won the early-season Girvan 3-day, was third in The Milk Race and was national time trial champion at 100 miles. The GS Strada team (Carbutt, Dave Cuming, Phil Griffiths and Joe Waugh) won the national 100 km team trial championship. Carbutt also won the season-long British Best All-Rounder time trial competition.

== Professional career ==
In 1978 Carbutt turned professional for Viking-Campagnolo. In his first year, he took a stage win at the Scottish Milk Race.

=== Lands End to John O'Groats record ===
In July 1979, during a busy professional season, Carbutt attempted Dick Poole's 1965 record from Lands End to John O'Groats. Carbutt made early inroads into Poole's schedule, struggled in a Scottish heat wave, and set a record time of 1 day, 23 hours, 23 minutes and 1 second - just inside Poole's mark.

Bernard Thompson said: "Paul Carbutt is probably the one and only rider ever to have covered such a wide variety of unpaced distances with such success... Carbutt turned professional for a successful career which included the Land's End to John o'Groats record in 1d 23h 23m 1s, breaking Dick Poole's 14-year-old record by 23m 34s. In the process, Carbutt lost five minutes in Cornwall when police accused him of speeding!"

=== Another win ===
In 1980 Carbutt won the Yorkshire Classic road race at Harrogate. He also took third in the Tom Simpson Memorial road race in 1981..

== Later life ==
Carbutt continued cycling after his professional career, riding with the Saracen Road Club again and later the Solihull Cycling Club. In 1984 he rode the 24-hour championship, attempting a medal at yet another distance. He finished 22nd.

Carbutt was a clay artist, designing transport solutions. He was later diagnosed with motor neurone disease and died in 2004.
