= British League of Racing Cyclists =

The British League of Racing Cyclists (BLRC) was an association formed in 1942 to promote road bicycle racing in Great Britain. It operated in competition with the National Cyclists' Union, a rivalry which lasted until the two merged in 1959 to form the British Cycling Federation.

== Background ==
The National Cyclists' Union (NCU) had, since the end of the 19th century, banned racing on the roads, fearing the police would ban all cycling as a result. A call for a ban "evoked hardly any opposition because road conditions were such that the possibility of massed racing on the highway was never even envisaged." "The position of cyclists on the roads of England and Wales had not been established and police forces had objected to cyclists racing. Matters came to a head on 21 July 1894 during a timed race on the North Road, then the main road north out of London, in which 50 riders competed with the help of other riders to pace them. A group of riders passed a woman and her horse and carriage at a point about 57 miles from the capital. The horse panicked, the riders fell off and the woman complained to the local police. They in turn banned cycle-racing on their roads."

The NCU administered not only road racing but track racing and ruled that its clubs were to move their races off the road and on to tracks, the forerunners of modern velodromes. Some clubs did but most were too far from any track and so a rebel movement began to organise not massed, paced races but individual competitions against the clock, over standard distances and held out in the countryside, in the early hours and in secret to avoid antagonising the police.

The NCU and what became the Road Time Trials Council eventually became colleagues, each administering its own section of the sport, neither allowing massed racing.

== The war and Percy Stallard ==
The National Cyclists Union was the international body for cycling in England and Wales and sent teams to the Olympic Games and to world championships. It also licensed riders to compete abroad in races such as Bordeaux–Paris. But teams had to be selected not in races akin to which they were being entered but in competitions held on private roads such as airfields and car-racing courses.

One of the riders to be selected was an enthusiast from Wolverhampton, Percy Stallard. The experience of massed racing stimulated him and he believed that the NCU's objection to it on grounds that it would disrupt traffic and give cycling a bad name was pointless in wartime when petrol rationing had largely cleared the roads of vehicles.

He wrote in December 1941 to Adrian Chamberlin of the NCU:

It is amazing to think that this is the only country in Europe where this form of sport is not permitted... There seems to be the mistaken idea that it would be necessary to close the roads. This, of course, is entirely wrong... There would be no better time than now to introduce this form of racing to the roads, what with the decreased amount of motor traffic and the important part that the cycle is playing in wartime transport.

I am convinced that to allow massed-start racing to recommence its career after the war on circuits is utter madness. Even before the war massed-start racing could not be counted as a national branch of the sport as it was only possible for riders living within easy reach of Donington and Brooklands [the two most circuits most used] to try their hand at the game, excepting on special occasions. It should be obvious to anyone the least bit interested that there cannot be a future to this form of racing while it is allowed to remain on the circuit.

Stallard protested that the airfields and car circuits which were the only place that the NCU would allow massed racing had been taken by the Army and RAF. Chamberlin was not impressed and replied at the end of January to say that the NCU had considered the question but considered it unwise.

== The breakaway race ==
In the first week of April Stallard sent letters on the notepaper of the bicycle shop that he ran to announce his plan for a 59-mile race from Llangollen to Wolverhampton on 7 June.

"I just explained to the police what I was doing and told them that things like that were normal on the Continent, and they said they were happy and that they'd try to help", he said." He obtained sponsorship from the Wolverhampton Express and Star newspaper, offered any profits to the newspaper's Forces Comfort Fund, and recruited 40 riders to take part. He also asked the NCU and the Road Time Trials Council (RTTC) not to suspend those who took part "as this was liable to raise controversy detrimental to the sport."

Stallard's plan brought strong opposition not just from the NCU and RTTC but from the cycling establishment, particularly from the veteran administrator and writer George Herbert Stancer. His fear, and that of the NCU, was that asking the police for permission to hold a race ended the freedom of cyclists to hold races, or at any rate lone races against the clock, without interference.

Under the headline A hopeless revolt, he wrote:

They have plunged into their dangerous experiment without regard for the consequences... I understand that the 'rebels' want to go on holding races by police permit and under police protection; and when this is withdrawn they are apparently content to put up the shutters and go out of business as promoters.... If we voluntarily place road-racing under police control, we sign its death warrant.... If we are to race on the road, for heaven's sake let us do it as free citizens, and not by permission of the police.

Stancer's words influenced the NCU and it banned Stallard before the race had started. An agreement with the Road Time Trials Council meant that it too banned him.

Stallard went ahead and his race finished, without incident, in front of a crowd at West Park. There were 34 riders, including two Dutchmen serving in the army in Britain. The programme, priced 2d, urged: "Onlookers are earnestly requested to remain on the pavements at all times during the race." It also said that "The event is run with the kind permission of the Chief Constables of Denbighshire, Shropshire, Staffordshire and Wolverhampton." Cycling reported:

More than a thousand people watched the finish of the massed-start race organised by Percy Stallard, from Llangollen to Wolverhampton, on Sunday afternoon. The Chief Constable of Wolverhampton, an inspector, a sergeant and 15 uniformed policemen kept the crowd back. Police cars and police motorcyclists patrolled portions of the course. A police motorcyclist led the racing men through the streets to the finish. E. A. Price, of Wolverhampton, won the sprint from his clubmate, C. J. Anslow.

The report – in which the frequent mention of the police reflected the magazine's concerns as expressed by Stancer – went on to explain that the race had been banned by the NCU and the RTTC but that there had been no incidents other than a lorry backing on to the course. Fifteen riders finished and all those involved in the race were expelled from the NCU. Stallard was banned for life for refusing to account for himself to the NCU's management.

The race result:

1. A. E. Price, Wolverhampton 2h 25min 40sec
2. C. J. Anslow, Wolverhampton, at 1sec
3. J. Holmes, RAF, at 3sec
4. J. Kremers, Royal Dutch Brigade, at 53sec
5. E. Whitmore, RAF, at 55sec
6. R. Jones, Wolverhampton, at 56sec
7. S. Trubshaw, Wolverhampton, at 1min
8. E. Turner, Wolverhampton, at 1:05
9. R. Whitmore, RAF, at 3:30
10. E. Reddish, Bradford, same time
11. J. Clark, Wolverhampton, at 3:40
12. L. Roe, Bradford, at 3:52
13. J. Rhodes, Bradford, at 5:49
14. F. Beeston, Birmingham, at 7:00
15. E. Upton, Wolverhampton, at 7:06

== British League of Racing Cyclists ==
"When I ran the race," Stallard said in Winning, "I didn't think anything of it. I just thought it was something that would be taken up by others. I thought that, when the point had been proved, the NCU would be only too pleased to find that they'd got a bit of activity. It had all been above board. The police had never seen one, of course, but I just told them it was in conformity with international practice and races of this type were organised in all different countries and they had no queries at all."

Further races were held elsewhere in the country and the clubs that organised them formed regional groups. The first was in the Midlands in July 1942, called by the Wolverhampton RCC. With nowhere to go but insistent that massed racing was the future, Stallard encouraged the groups to merge to form the British League of Racing Cyclists. The founding meeting was of 24 people at the Sherebrook Lodge Hotel, Buxton, Derbyshire on Sunday 14 November 1942.

The founding members - they were listed by their initials rather than their names - were M. J. Gibson, S. A. Padwick, P. T. Stallard, E. F. Angrave, J. E. Finn, R.Jones, E. R. Hickman, G. Anstee, L. Plume, G. Truelove, C. J. Fox, L. Merrills, W. W. Greaves. E. Reddish, E. Thompson, R. Hartley, K. Swaby, Chas J. Fox, S. Copley, S. Cooper, K. Pattinson, G. Clark, Mrs W. W. Greaves and Miss G. A. Stiff.

Other riders and then whole clubs joined the BLRC. British cycle racing became polarised, frequently bitterly so. Clubs could not affiliate to both the NCU and the BLRC; riders who raced in BLRC races were banned from NCU events and from time trials run by the Road Time Trials Council. The magazine Cycling at first refused to report BLRC events. According to John Dennis, at the time racing editor of the rival paper, The Bicycle:

What has been lost beneath the clouds of myths surrounding this situation is the reason why many clubs were cautious about wholeheartedly supporting the road-racing movement. Remember that it was wartime and the younger membership of most clubs was away engaged in a war. The older members left at home did not wish to risk damaging a sport which all had enjoyed, so they decided to maintain the status quo until the war ended. The rank and file of the NCU/RTTC membership was not anti-BLRC - all it wanted to do was preserve the sport until the service men returned to civvy street.

The BLRC itself wasn't that certain of its acceptance by the police. A sticker added to its membership licence read:

POLICE INTERFERENCE

1. Make no statement to the Police about anything happening during a Race.
2. If questioned, say 'I do not wish to make a statement.'
3. Any rider accused of any offence which he does not consider he has committed should add 'I deny that I ......... (whatever he is accused of).'
4. DO NOT SAY ANYTHING ELSE
5. Give full details to the organiser.

In 1943, the League promoted the first British national road race championship, in Harrogate and later the Brighton-Glasgow stage race – a forerunner to the Daily Express Tour of Britain first run in 1951.

The BLRC also organised representative teams to races in other countries, although not through the international body, the Union Cycliste Internationale, by whom it wasn't recognised but through private arrangements with individuals, other breakaway organisations and sometimes through communist sports clubs which operated outside their own country's framework. From 1948 the BLRC sent a team to the Peace Race, Warsaw-Berlin-Prague, considered then the world's international amateur stage race. In 1952, Ian Steel won and Britain took the team prize. That led the UCI to recognise at least the existence of the BLRC. For the moment it said it would have to cooperate through the NCU but enthusiasts believed they had achieved international power.

Representatives of the NCU walked out of the meeting before the vote, saying the UCI's proposal was unconstitutional. One of its delegates, H. S. Anderson said: "There is no provision in the statute of the UCI for provisional or temporary affiliation of a national federation. The committee resolution is invalid because it violates several statutes of the UCI." Had they voted, the resolution would have failed.

== The Tour de France ==
With the BLRC now halfway through the door, Britain sent a team to the Tour de France in 1955. It was the first team ever sent since the previous riders, Bill Burl and Charles Holland had competed as private entrants before the war. To turn down the Tour was something the NCU wouldn't do and yet it couldn't select riders who were BLRC members. To leave out BLRC members, however, would be to send a weakened team and antagonise a wavering UCI. Yet the BLRC could not select a team because the Union Cycliste Internationale didn't formally recognise it. The conundrum was solved by asking a panel of newspaper reporters to do the job instead.

== The beginning of the end ==
Running the BLRC was never easy and there were frequent rows within its administration. The organiser of the first big stage race, Jimmy Kain, wrote to Stallard after the BLRC had merged with the BCF of the "two years of nervous and physical breakdown that followed the six years of BLRC office."

Stallard was a bright and energetic man with a vision for his sport. But he was not a man to tolerate argument or those with other views. Peter Bryan, editor of The Bicycle, later an associate of Sporting Cyclist and managing editor of Cycling said:

Stallard had the most abrasive nature that I have ever met. He could never believe that he could have a bad idea or make a bad decision. And sometimes he'd go berserk with those who disagreed with him. He didn't have, let us say, the delicacies of negotiation.

Having achieved what he wanted, with the NCU's final acceptance of massed racing on the road, Stallard placed the continuity of the BLRC over the end of the civil war that the BLRC and the NCU had conducted. He said: "The NCU were running road races and we were running road races and there wasn't any need for amalgamation [of the NCU and the BLRC, to form the British Cycling Federation] at all."

Critics said Stallard had lost sight of the intention of the BLRC, which had been to bring racing to the open road and that, once achieved, that there was no further point in rival cycling administrations. Peter Bryan said: "The BLRC was originally a gang of enthusiasts. Then along came what I'd call the parliamentarians of pedal power, men who saw a runaway organisation and decided they'd take it over." Stallard was influenced by those who agreed with him but in the end he and others became too much for the BLRC's other administrators and the BLRC magazine, The Leaguer, reported in 1954: "There is a malignant ulcer prevalent in the cycling world common to all three racing bodies in this country. It is the taint of vanity and culminates in the clash of personality."

With both the BLRC and the NCU physically and financially reeling from a civil war that had long outlasted the war with Germany, the two merged in 1959 to form the British Cycling Federation, now known as British Cycling.

The January 1959 edition of the BLRC magazine, The Leaguer, reported formally:

This Annual General Meeting of the British League of Racing Cyclists agrees that all assets, liabilities, obligations and commitments of the British League of Racing Cyclists shall be transferred to or handed over to the British Cycling Federation as from the date of the incorporation of that body.

The text accompanying the announcement said:

It was evident, even before the decisions of this 17th and final Annual General Meeting of the British League of Racing Cyclists were taken, that League Sections and Union Centres up and down the country were already providing the momentum for the practical activities of the British Cycling Federation. Not only has contact been established between many of them but meetings have been held and decisions taken for the setting up of the Divisions which will form the organisational basis of the new Federation.

It also said that "those who are predisposed to live in the past, and even the progressive League is old enough now to number several such in its ranks", would greet the news with surprise. Stallard saw the merger as treason by "just three people [who] were allowed the freedom to destroy the BLRC" and until his death saw the new British Cycling Federation (BCF) as a reincarnation of the NCU. In 1989 he wrote:

I have often sat back and thought just how nice it would be if you could relive your life based on the experience gained. For myself, I would never again try to achieve the impossible by trying to change things. On the two occasions I have tried to do this [he tried to introduce age-related racing for riders older than 40], I have failed, not because I lack followers, or because of the opposition of opposing bodies, but because of the activities of anarchists and those who are envious of your success and popularity.

== Inheritance ==
To the question of whether Britain would have moved to massed racing anyway, without the BLRC, Peter Bryan says not, saying that the established cycling authorities had become entrenched in their positions, their own rivalry overshadowed by their joint fears and interests.

The NCU and the RTTC were never friends. The RTTC were particular bastards and they had so many clever men in the top echelon, many more than the NCU. They were steeped in the tradition of time-trialling and what it stood for and they wouldn't budge a jot or tickle.

Stallard's success was that he alerted the UCI to a problem in British cycling which led the UCI to threaten Britain with exclusion from world cycling unless it sorted out the conflict between the NCU and the BLRC. Seeing the BLRC as closer to the UCI's interests, it suggested it would recognise the BLRC and not the NCU as the representative body. It was because of that that the NCU relented and agreed to license the massed races it had hitherto opposed.

"You can never say that if it didn't happen then this wouldn't have happened, but I can't see what else [other than the BLRC] would have brought it [massed racing] about," said Peter Bryan.
