= John Woodburn (cyclist) =

British racing cyclist (1936–2017)

John Woodburn (1936 – 14 April 2017) was an English road and individual time trial cyclist. He was national 25-mile champion in 1961, RTTC British Best All-Rounder in 1978, and holder of several UK Road Records Association place-to-place cycling records.

== Time trial competition ==
He was RTTC national 25-mile time trial champion in 1961, and currently holds age-related records.

In 2001, Woodburn received his award as best British Veteran from Eddy Merckx at the RTTC Champions Evening at Derby, on 6 January.

In July 2002, he broke the 50 mile time-trial National Age Record for over 65s. He completed the Didcot course fourth overall in 1 hour 47 minutes and 40 seconds, breaking the record by nearly three minutes. He had been aiming for the record for two years and, recently retired, he had been using his new free time to put in extra training. At 70, he rode a 10-mile time trial in 21 minutes 48 seconds.

== Distance records ==
Aged 45, Woodburn set a Land's End to John O' Groats (end-to-end) record in 1982 with a time of 45 hours, 3 minutes and 16 seconds. His record remained for over eight years until beaten by Andy Wilkinson in October 1990 by less than a minute (45hrs, 2 minutes, 18 seconds).

Woodburn is in the Guinness Book of Records with a time of 9 hours 3 minutes 7 seconds for London – Bath and return. He has also cycled well over 500 miles in 24 hours. He broke the Cardiff to London record on a Moulton Speed, covering 162 miles at an average speed of 24 miles per hour.

In May 2012 Woodburn re-rode the Leipzig-Berlin stage of the 1955 Peace Race, as part of the Alf Buttler Peace Race Tribute Ride.
