= Ian Cammish =

English cyclist

Personal information
- Full name: Ian Scott Cammish
- Born: 1 October 1956 England, United Kingdom

Cycling career
- Sport: Cycling
- Discipline: Time Trialist
- Role: Rider

Ian Scott Cammish (born 1 October 1956) is an English time trial cyclist.

He dominated British time trialling in the 1980s, holding the Road Time Trials Council’s British Best All-Rounder for nine years – 1980 to 1985 consecutively (still the longest unbroken string of wins) and 1987 to 1989 consecutively.

Cammish has won and broken over 50 National Championships and Records including nine times National 100 miles champion and four times National 50 miles champion.

He was the first rider to break the 30 mph barrier for an out and back 50 mile time trial (1983 with 1 h 39 min 51 s).

In 1983 he broke his own existing RTTC out and back 100 mile record by an unprecedented 7 minutes or so with a time of 3 h 31 min 53 s, setting a new standard and goals for 100 mile time trials.

He remains the current holder of the RRA (Road Records Association) 'straight out' 50 and 100 mile records (1 h 24 min 32 s and 3 h 11 min 11 s respectively).

Despite his successes he never won the National 12 Hour championship until the age of 51 when, in August 2008, he finally won the medal with his distance of 284.54 miles.

He was a recipient of the UK cycling's top accolade the Bidlake Memorial Prize, named after Frederick Thomas Bidlake, in 1991.

== Golden Book ==
He has a citation in the Golden Book of Cycling (1990s), a single copy British compendium of illuminated manuscripts that records outstanding cycling contributions of riders, officials and administrators.

He remains an active cyclist.
