= British Best All-Rounder =

The British Best All-Rounder (BBAR) competition, organised by Cycling Time Trials, is an annual British cycle-racing competition. It ranks riders by the average of their average speeds in individual time trials, over 50 and 100 miles (160 km) and 12 hours for men, and over 25, 50 and 100 miles (160 km) for women. There are similar competitions for under-18s and teams of three. Qualifying races have to be ridden between April and September.

Certificates are awarded to men with 22 mph (35.5 km/h) or faster and women averaging 20 mph (32.25 km/h) or more. The junior speeds are 23 mph (37 km/h) and 21 mph (37 and 33.9 km/h). Competitions modelled on the BBAR are organised within UK regions, and for over-40s.

== History ==
The BBAR was announced by the magazine Cycling on 4 April 1930. It offered an annual trophy valued at £26 and a shield to be held for a year by the winning team.

Time-trialling had been the staple of British cycling since the National Cyclists' Union (NCU) had banned massed racing on the road in 1888 as a reaction to police objections it feared would threaten all cyclists. The NCU wanted clubs to promote races only on tracks, or velodromes, but they were too distant and local groups began organising not the massed races that the NCU banned but individual competitions against the clock: time trials.

British cyclists came to see time-trialling as the purest form of competition, free as it was of the tactics of massed racing. But there was no reliable way of seeing who was the best all-rounder, over all distances and across a season, because difficulties with travel meant not all riders could take part. The BBAR overcame the problems by allowing riders to compete where they chose and then register their performances. According to time-trialling historian, Bernard Thompson: "It was probably the best thing that has ever happened to British time-trial sport, even to this day."

=== The first winner ===
The first winner was the South Londoner, Frank Southall, riding for the Norwood Paragon club. He averaged 21.141 mph (34.023 km/h) and won again the following three years. After his fourth consecutive win, 7,000 cyclists watched at the Royal Albert Hall in London as Southall signed the Golden Book of Cycling during the BBAR prize-giving concert.

=== Change of ownership ===
The BBAR competition was suspended during the war. It restarted in 1944, promoted not by Cycling but by the time-trial administrative body, the Road Time Trials Council (RTTC), today known as Cycling Time Trials.

British cycling was by then in a civil war, with the NCU's ban on massed racing having been thwarted by a new organisation, the British League of Racing Cyclists (BLRC). Both the RTTC and Cycling had campaigned against the BLRC, still convinced massed racing threatened the sport as a whole. But the editor of Cycling, H. H. "Harry" England was so upset that the RTTC had taken over the BBAR that he changed sides and began reporting BLRC races.

=== After the war ===
The 1944 BBAR recognised that few riders had been able to train as they had previously and averaged speeds over 25, 50 and 100 miles (160 km). Twelve-hour races would also have been hard to organise because, said Bernard Thompson: "Signposts had been taken down during the war and it is doubtful that a sufficient number of marshals and feeders could have been mustered in those austere times." This shortened BBAR was won by Albert Derbyshire with 23.549 mph (37.898 km/h). In 1945 the competition returned to its full distance.

=== Tom Barlow ===
Calculations of riders' averages were made from 1945 to 1976 by a Manchester enthusiast, Tom Barlow. Bernard Thompson related: "All Tom's calculations were done the hard way; there were no pocket calculators in his lifetime and it is doubtful that he would have changed his tried and trusted methods, his tables of average speeds combined with his outsized slide-rule... about three feet long." Barlow died aged 90 in 1982.

== Winners ==
The men's competition has been won eleven times by Kevin Dawson, two more than Ian Cammish (nine). The women's competition was for many years dominated by Beryl Burton, who won 25 times from 1959 to 1983 inclusive. The only other women to have won the competition more than twice are June Pitchford, who won three times in a row from 1984, and Julia Shaw who won a fourth title in 2010.

Three BBAR winners have competed in the Tour de France: Charlie Holland (1937), Peter Hill (1967), and Arthur Metcalfe (1967 and 1968); Metcalfe is the only one to have completed the event.

The winner of each competition is determined by a simple average of the average speeds over the three distances. This average is not an average speed, since the distances are not used to weight the average. The table below shows this simple average as ``average speed``.

Year	Winner (men)	Club	Average speed (mph)	Winner (women)	Club	Average speed (mph)
2023	Andrew Critchlow	Paceline RT	27.948	Kate Allan	Team Bottrill	28.740
2022	Marcel Schubert	Darlington CC	27.896	Kate Allan	Team Bottrill	28.466
2021	Tom Hutchinson	Team Bottrill	29.197	Joanna Patterson	The Independent Pedaler - Nopinz	27.541
2020	Adam Wild	GS Metro	28.940	Alex Clay	The Independent Pedaler - Nopinz	26.470
2019	Jonathan Shubert	Arctic Aircon RT	28.414	Vicky Gill	DRAG2ZERO	28.032
2018	Kieron Davies	DRAG2ZERO	28.954	Alice Lethbridge	DRAG2ZERO	28.360
2017	Adam Duggleby	Vive Le Velo	29.356	Alice Lethbridge	DRAG2ZERO	28.220
2016	Richard Bideau	Pendle Forest CC	28.867	Hayley Simmonds	AeroCoach	28.705
2015	Adam Topham	High Wycombe CC	28.774	Hayley Simmonds	Team Velosport	27.145
2014	Adam Topham	High Wycombe CC	28.231	Jasmijn Muller	Kingston Wheelers CC	26.586
2013	Adam Topham	High Wycombe CC	27.322	Paula Moseley	Climb on Bikes RT	25.969
2012	Adam Topham	High Wycombe CC	27.860	Paula Moseley	Climb On Bikes CC	25.668
2011	Jeff Jones	Chippenham & District Wheelers	28.023	Jane Kilmartin	Cult Racing	26.214
2010	Julian Jenkinson	UTAG Yamaha.com	27.202	Julia Shaw	UTAG Yamaha.com	27.415
2009	Nik Bowdler	Farnborough and Camberley CC	27.206	Julia Shaw	UTAG Yamaha.com	27.451
2008	Nik Bowdler	Farnborough and Camberley CC	27.329	Lynn Hamel	Thegreenroomgroup.com	26.193
2007	Kevin Dawson	Pinarello RT	27.283	Julia Shaw	GS Strada	25.562
2006	Kevin Dawson	Agisko-Dart RT	27.454	Julia Shaw	GS Strada	26.005
2005	Michael Hutchinson	API-Metrow	27.203	Ruth Eyles	Beacon RCC	25.228
2004	Kevin Dawson	Planet X	27.541	Carol Gandy	San Fairy Ann CC	24.806
2003	Kevin Dawson	Life Repair CRT	28.26	Ruth Dorrington	Pete Read Racing	25.421
2002	Kevin Dawson	Compensation Group RT	27.793	Karen Steele	Caygill Frames RT	25.364
2001	Kevin Dawson	Pete Read Racing-Caygill Frames	27.631	Karen Steele	Pete Read Racing-Caygill Frames	25.29
2000	Michael Hutchinson	Bio RT	27.558	Liz Milne	GS Strada	25.946
1999	Kevin Dawson	Pete Read Racing	27.15	Jill Reames	Swaledale CC	26.072
1998	Kevin Dawson	Team Ambrosia	27.33	Maxine Johnson	Letchworth Velo Club	25.417
1997	Kevin Dawson	GS Strada	27.92	Jill Reames	Swaledale CC	27.025
1996	Andy Wilkinson	Port Sunlight Wheelers	28.236	Julie Derham	Twickenham CC	26.697
1995	Gethin Butler	Norwood Paragon CC	27.148	Anne Plant	Swaledale CC	25.169
1994	Gethin Butler	Racing Team Italia	26.874	Yvonne McGregor	Swaledale CC	26.094
1993	Kevin Dawson	GS Strada	27.062	Leigh Lamont	Antelope Racing Team	25.684
1992	Kevin Dawson	GS Strada	26.777	Sue Wright	Chelmer CC	25.612
1991	Glen Longland	Antelope Racing Team	26.94	Mandy Jones	Liverpool Mercury RC	25.766
1990	Gary Dighton	Manchester Wheelers	26.216	Elaine Ward	Scarborough Paragon CC	25.268
1989	Ian Cammish	Manchester Wheelers	26.412	Sue Wright	Chelmer CC	25.259
1988	Ian Cammish	Manchester Wheelers	26.369	Margaret Allen	Barnsley RC	25.298
1987	Ian Cammish	Manchester Wheelers	26.094	Margeret Allen	Barnsley RC	25.687
1986	Glenn Longland	Antelope Racing Team	26.771	June Pitchford	Stourbridgc CC	24.962
1985	Ian Cammish	GS Strada	26.234	June Pitchford	Stourbridgc CC	25.321
1984	Ian Cammish	GS Strada	26.013	June Pitchford	Stourbridgc CC	25.463
1983	Ian Cammish	GS Strada	27.355	Beryl Burton	Morley CC	25.118
1982	Ian Cammish	GS Strada	26.000	Beryl Burton	Morley CC	25.206
1981	Ian Cammish	GS Strada	26.341	Beryl Burton	Morley CC	25.219
1980	Ian Cammish	Edgware RC	26.174	Beryl Burton	Morley CC	25.733
1979	Phil Griffiths	GS Strada	26.149	Beryl Burton	Morley CC	25.228
1978	John Woodburn	Sydenham Wheelers	26.067	Beryl Burton	Morley CC	25.565
1977	Paul Carbutt	GS Strada	25.566	Beryl Burton	Morley CC	25.069
1976	Phil Griffiths	GS Strada	25.97	Beryl Burton	Morley CC	26.665
1975	Phil Griffiths	City of Stoke ACCS	25.418	Beryl Burton	Morley CC	26.047
1974	Phil Griffiths	City of Stoke ACCS	25.093	Beryl Burton	Morley CC	25.302
1973	Ray Lewis	Coventry CC	25.022	Beryl Burton	Morley CC	26.267
1972	Bob Porter	Hounslow & District Wheelers	24.914	Beryl Burton	Morley CC	26.112
1971	Phil Griffiths	Gloucester City CC	25.109	Beryl Burton	Morley CC	25.463
1970	John Watson	Clifton CC	25.958	Beryl Burton	Morley CC	25.729
1969	Antony Taylor	Oldbury & District CC	25.67	Beryl Burton	Morley CC	25.849
1968	Martyn Roach	Hounslow & District Wheelers	25.428	Beryl Burton	Morley CC	25.942
1967	Mike McNamara	Rockingham CC	24.593	Beryl Burton	Morley CC	25.696
1966	Arthur Metcalfe	Leeds St Christophers CCC	24.797	Beryl Burton	Morley CC	24.812
1965	Keith Stacey	Seamons CC	24.309	Beryl Burton	Morley CC	25.439
1964	Peter Hill	Askern CC	24.645	Beryl Burton	Morley CC	24.716
1963	Peter Hill	Askern CC	24.041	Beryl Burton	Morley CC	24.138
1962	Frank Colden	Camberley Wheelers	24.652	Beryl Burton	Morley CC	24.036
1961	Brian Kirby	Army CU	24.04	Beryl Burton	Morley CC	23.656
1960	Brian Wiltcher	Zeus RC	24.526	Beryl Burton	Morley CC	23.714
1959	Brian Wiltcher	Zeus RC	24.045	Beryl Burton	Morley CC	23.724
1958	Owen Blower	Leicestershire RC	24.363	Millie Robinson	Manx Viking Wheelers	23.193
1957	Ray Booty	Army CU	24.126	Iris Miles	Scala Wheelers	22.849
1956	Ray Booty	Ericsson Wheelers CC	24.126	Iris Miles	Scala Wheelers	22.761
1955	Ray Booty	Ericsson Wheelers CC	23.956	Mary Dawson	Teesside RC	22.632
1954	Vic Gibbons	Brentwood RC	23.811	Mary Dawson	Teesside RC	22.399
1953	Vic Gibbons	Brentwood RC	23.578	Joyce Harris	Apollo CC	22.436
1952	Ken Joy	Medway Wheelers	23.83	Christina Brown	South Shields Victoria CC	22.289
1951	Ken Joy	Medway Wheelers	23.414	Elsie Horton	Coventry CC	22.38
1950	Ken Joy	Medway Wheelers	23.33	Eileen Sheridan	Coventry CC	22.134
1949	Ken Joy	Medway Wheelers	22.808	Eilleen Sheridan	Coventry CC	21.827
1948	Pete Beardsmore	Medway Wheelers	22.584	Suzy Rimmington	Meersbrook CC	21.756

Year	Winner (men)	Club	Average speed (mph)
1947	Albert Derbyshire	Calleva RC	22.744
1946	Albert Derbyshire	Calleva RC	22.843
1945	Jock Allison	Musselburgh RC	22.479
1944	Albert Derbyshire	Calleva RC	23.549
1939			
1938	Harold Earnshaw	Monkton CC	22.627
1937	Cyril Heppleston	Yorkshire RC	22.348
1936	Charles Holland	Midland C&AC	
1935	Stanley W. Miles	Century RC	21.809
1934	Ernest J. Capell	Allondon RC	21.622
1933	Frank Southall	Norwood Paragon CC	
1932	Frank Southall	Norwood Paragon CC	
1931	Frank Southall	Norwood Paragon CC	
1930	Frank Southall	Norwood Paragon CC	21.141

== British Best All-Rounder Men's Team Winners ==
Year	Team	Av Speed
2024	FTP (Fulfill The Potential) (H.Persson, L.Williams, T.Thornely)	26.892 mph
2023	FTP (Fulfill The Potential) (T.Thornely, T.McEvoy, L.Williams)	26.859 mph
2022	No team qualified	
2021	FTP (Fulfill the Potential) Racing (T.McEvoy, J.Shubert, A.Whittaker)	26.731 mph
2020	GS Metro (A.Wild, C.Donaldson, A.Scorey)	26.611 mph
2019	Arctic Aircon RT (J.Shubert, N.Lauder, N.Clarke)	26.391 mph
2018	a3crg (C.Mitchell, S.Williamson, D.Shepherd)	27.157 mph
2017	GS Metro (C.Donaldson, D.Grieves, B.Lane)	27.807 mph
2016	Team Velovelocity (D.Bloy, D.Green, B.Keeley)	26.501 mph
2015	Team Swift (J.Wainman, L.Cairns, N.Skellern)	26.617 mph
2014	Team Swift (J.Wainman, N.Skellern, R.Townsend)	26.723 mph
2013	Team Swift (J.Wainman, S.Berry, R.Townsend)	26.507 mph
2012	Team Swift (S.Berry, J.Wainman, N.Skellern)	26.371 mph
2011	Team PedalRevolution.co.uk (A.Bason, N.Bowdler, M.Arnold)	26.117 mph
2010	Team PedalRevolution.co.uk (A.Bason, N.Bowdler, M.Arnold)	26.230 mph
2009	Team Swift - Allsports (J.Wainman, C.Ruebotham, B.Walker)	25.794 mph
2008	Team Swift - Allsports (C.Ruebotham, J.Wainman, S.Beldon)	26.128 mph
2007	Team Swift - Allsports (C.Ruebotham, J.Wainman, S.Beldon)	25.992 mph
2006	Arctic Shorter-Rochford RT (M.Broadwith, A.Proffitt, T.Bayley)	25.713 mph
2005	API-Metrow (M.Hutchinson, S.Lemanski, D.Knock)	24.345 mph
2004	Preston Wheelers (G.Butler, J.Morgan, P.Fleming)	25.308 mph
2003	Preston Wheelers (G.Butler, J.Morgan, P.Fleming)	26.408 mph
2002	Preston Wheelers (G.Butler, J.Morgan, P.Fleming)	25.683 mph
2001	Pete Read Racing - Caygill Frames (K.Dawson, J.Wainman, N.Green)	25.782 mph
2000	Pete Read Racing - Caygill Frames (K.Dawson, B.Walker, J.Charles)	25.346 mph
1999	VC St Raphael (P.Rogers, R.Homer, C.Birch)	25.662 mph
1998	Hounslow & District Wheelers (C.Roshier, R.Jackson, P.Holdsworth)	25.297 mph
1997	GS Metro (B.Walker, H.Walker, J.Rickards)	25.529 mph
1996	Hounslow & District Wheelers (C.Roshier, P.Holdsworth, B.Garlinge)	25.691 mph
1995	VC Deal (M.Whitehead, A.Proffitt, T.Bayley)	24.893 mph
1994	Optimum Performance RT (K.Dawson, N.Gardiner, W.Randle)	26.418 mph
1993	Hounslow & District Wheelers (C.Roshier, P.Holdsworth, B.Garlinge)	25.164 mph
1992	Clarence Wheelers (R.Hughes, B.Edwards, S.House)	25.584 mph
1991	Antelope RT (G.Longland, P.Pickers, R.Dadswell)	25.390 mph
1990	Manchester Wheelers Club (G.Dighton, A.Gornall, E.Adkins)	25.555 mph
1989	Manchester Wheelers Club (I.Cammish, D.Smith, E.Adkins)	25.849 mph
1988	Manchester Wheelers Club (I.Cammish, D.Smith, J.Woodburn)	25.729 mph
1987	Manchester Wheelers Club (I.Cammish, J.Woodburn, S.Potts)	25.106 mph
1986	Manchester Wheelers Club (I.Cammish, P.Guy, S.Potts)	25.183 mph
1985	GS Strada (I.Cammish, T.Mullins, A.Gilchrist)	25.198 mph
1984	GS Strada (I.Cammish, A.Gilchrist, P.W.Griffiths)	25.418 mph
1983	GS Strada (I.Cammish, A.Gilchrist, J.Timmons)	25.672 mph
1982	Manchester Wheelers Club (J.Woodburn, P.Guy, M.Harney)	24.503 mph
1981	GS Strada (I.Cammish, P.W.Griffiths, A.Gilchrist)	25.122 mph
1980	GS Strada (P.W.Griffiths, A.Gilchrist, P.Carr)	24.406 mph
1979	Edgware RC (P.Wells, I.Cammish, M.Burrows)	24.005 mph
1978	Unity CC (P.Wells, D.Cunningham, R.Stirling)	24.206 mph
1977	Rockingham CC (M.McNamara, T.Mullins, E.Smallwood)	24.197 mph
1976	Rockingham CC (M.McNamara, T.Mullins, E.Smallwood)	24.102 mph
1975	Doncaster Wheelers (G.B.Huck, A.Robson, R.S.Bickerstaffe)	24.073 mph
1974	Rockingham CC (M.McNamara, T.Mullins, C.Bennett)	24.326 mph
1973	Hounslow & District Wheelers (M.C.Roach, R.H.Porter, J.E.Marshall)	24.568 mph
1972	Hounslow & District Wheelers (R.H.Porter, M.C.Roach, J.E.Marshall)	24.465 mph
1971	Hounslow & District Wheelers (M.C.Roach, J.E.Marshall, K.Clapton)	24.356 mph
1970	Rockingham CC (G.B.Huck, T.Mullins, M.McNamara)	24.729 mph
1969	Clifton CC (E.J.Watson, R.Cromack, P.D.Smith)	24.941 mph
1968	Hounslow & District Wheelers (M.C.Roach, J.E.Marshall, K.J.Fairhead)	24.539 mph
1967	Clifton CC (P.D.Smith, R.Cromack, E.J.Watson)	24.641 mph
1966	Clifton CC (P.D.Smith, P.T.Taylor, A.Hargreaves)	23.897 mph
1965	Clifton CC (P.D.Smith, A.Hargreaves, A.J.Boswell)	24.231 mph
1964	Edgware RC (E.E.Moody, C.J.Mumford, P.Ryan)	23.968 mph
1963	Selby CC (R.Charles, G.K.Wood, J.L.West)	23.861 mph
1962	Camberley Wheelers (R.F.Colden, A.W.Stone, K.J.Fairhead)	23.693 mph
1961	Bristol South CC (F.C.Holloway, J.Fry, J.S.Kempe)	23.337 mph
1960	Zeus RC (B.F.Wilcher, R.E.Munn, E.E.Moody)	23.617 mph
1959	Camberley Wheelers (R.F.Colden, J.Rogers, R.L.Agar)	23.706 mph
1958	Yorkshire RC (G.A.Salter, V.A.Denson, M.R.Breckon)	23.405 mph
1957	Midland Clarion C&AC (J.P.Ogden, G.A.Morris, C.J.Clarke)	23.140 mph
1956	Midland Clarion C&AC (J.P.Ogden, G.A.Morris, C.J.Clarke)	23.034 mph
1955	Midland Clarion C&AC (G.A.Morris, C.J.Clarke, J.P.Ogden)	22.959 mph
1954	Brentwood RC (V.A.Gibbons, B.W.Davie, R.Bond)	22.749 mph
1953	Brentwood RC (V.A.Gibbons, R.T.Spanton, G.L.Shaw)	22.677 mph
1952	Medway Wheelers CC (K.H.Joy, F.N.Jackson, B.F.Hawkes)	22.948 mph
1951	Medway Wheelers CC (K.H.Joy, F.N.Jackson, B.F.Hawkes)	22.559 mph
1950	Medway Wheelers CC (K.H.Joy, P.Beardsmore, F.N.Jackson)	22.664 mph
1949	Medway Wheelers CC (K.H.Joy, P.Beardsmore, R.Enfield)	22.644 mph
1948	Medway Wheelers CC (P.Beardsmore, K.H.Joy, R.Enfield)	22.353 mph
1947	Middlesex RC (A.B.Macdonald, L.A.Greening, K.F.Berry)	21.926 mph
1946	Calleva RC (A.E.G.Derbyshire, J.Simmons, R.J.Brown)	21.961 mph
1945	Calleva RC (A.E.G.Derbyshire, D.S.Burrows, L.C.Dunster)	21.613 mph
1944	Dukinfield CC (D.K.Hartley, J.Bell, N.Howe)	23.068 mph

== See also ==
- Individual time trial
- Time trialist
