= John Woodburn (footballer) =

Scottish footballer

Personal information
- Date of birth: 1895
- Place of birth: Darvel, Scotland
- Date of death: 1960 (aged 64–65)
- Positions: Centre-half; right-back

Senior career*
Years	Team	Apps	(Gls)
1919	Hurlford		
1919–1920	West Ham United	4	(0)
1920	Peterborough & Fletton United		
1920	Vale of Clyde		
1920–1928	Ayr United	128	(0)
1924–1925	→ Galston (loan)	1	(0)
- * Club domestic league appearances and goals

John Woodburn (1895 in Darvel – 1960) was a Scottish footballer who played as a defender in the Football League for West Ham United, and in the Scottish League for Ayr United.

Woodburn started his career at Hurlford before moving to Second Division club West Ham United on 28 July 1919. He made his debut for the east London club on 25 October at right-half, against Birmingham. He made three appearances in March 1920 at centre-half before transferring to Peterborough & Fletton United.

He returned to Scotland and played briefly for Vale of Clyde before signing for Ayr United on 25 May 1920. He spent the next eight seasons with the club, playing as a right-back. During the 1924–25 season, he made a single appearance for Galston while on loan.
