= Cycling Time Trials =

Bicycle racing organisation in Great Britain

- Sport: Cycling Time Trials
- Jurisdiction: Great Britain
- Abbreviation: CTT
- Founded: 2002
- Chairperson: Tim Smith
- Replaced: Road Time Trials Council
- (founded): 1937

Official website
- www.cyclingtimetrials.org.uk
- (England)
- (Scotland)
- (Wales)

Cycling Time Trials is the bicycle racing organisation which supervises individual and team time trials in England, Scotland and Wales. It was formed out of predecessor body the Road Time Trials Council (RTTC) in 2002.

== Time trialling ==
A time trial tests a rider not against other cyclists but the watch. Other than in team events, which are less numerous, competitors race individually, starting at intervals of a minute. Riders may not ride together when one catches another. The order of start is often organised so that the fastest riders are spaced apart. In that way they are less likely to catch each other, while when they catch lesser riders they will pass that much faster that neither will be helped or hindered.

UK races can be organised over any distance but in practice they are most often run at standard distances of 10, 25, 50 and 100 miles, with occasional races at 15 and 30 miles. The winner is the fastest over the course, routed so it finishes close to the start to lessen the effect of hills and wind. Longer events, lasting 12 or 24 hours are also held, the winner covering the greatest distance.

There are records at all distances, for riders on conventional bicycles, tandems and tricycles, plus for teams of individual riders, calculated on aggregate times or distances. There are championships for men, women, riders younger than 18, and competitions for veterans (riders aged 40 or more). The British Best All-Rounder competition, run by the RTTC since 1944, combines performances across three longer distance events.

== Early history of UK time trialling ==
In 1890, the National Cyclists' Union banned racing on UK public roads in fear of a ban not just on racing cyclists but all cycling. The legal position of cyclists was not secure. The cycling historian Bernard Thompson said: "Events organised by clubs in the 1880s, although taking place on quiet country roads, were constantly interrupted by the police. Often horse-mounted policemen charged at racers and threw sticks into their wheels."

The NCU asked clubs to run races on closed tracks, known now as velodromes. But few existed and so rebel races began, under the influence of men such as Frederick Thomas Bidlake, to continue racing on the road but in a way they believed need not bring police attention. Riders would start at intervals, usually a minute, and race against the clock. Riders meeting on the road were not allowed to race against each other. Unsure of the legal situation, riders dressed from neck to ankle in black to make themselves less conspicuous, never wore numbers but always carried a bell. Races started in the countryside at dawn on courses referred to only in code. Even the cycling press was asked not to say where a race was taking place and details to competitors were headed "private and confidential" up to the 1960s.

There is dispute over which was the first race in this fashion but credit is usually given to the North Road Cycling Club of north London. It was held over 50 miles (approx 80 km) on 5 October 1895. Within two years, time trials had also been banned by the NCU, but events continued to be run secretly. Les Bowerman, who researched this and races that followed, said:

What distinguished them from earlier unpaced races was that the riders started at intervals of two or three minutes in reverse handicap order, the fastest first. Company riding was not forbidden but was unlikely to occur. This would then be very similar to a time-trial as we know it.

The fact, as Bowerman says, that there were unpaced races against the clock before the North Road event in October 1895, means that the North Road club can not, as it often is, be described as the founder of time-trialling. Bernard Thompson, a historian of British time-trialling, wrote:

Neither the Road Time Trials Council or the Road Racing Council before them can claim to have invented time-trialling. Without question, time-trials took place a century ago and the National Cyclists' Union national time-trial championship time-trials are recorded in 1878 when A. A. Weir was the victor with a time of 1m 27m 47s on a high ordinary. What the RRC did contribute was as great a measure as possible of uniformity in the conduct of road competitions.

== Road Racing Council ==
In 1922, Bidlake formed the Road Racing Council – membership of which was restricted to members of the North Road, Bath Road, Anfield, Polytechnic, Kingsdale, Etna, Anerley, North London, Century, Unity and Midland cycling clubs. Each was already organising events on the road. The first meeting was at the offices of the Cyclists' Touring Club at 280 Euston Road, London on 27 June. The Road Racing Council did not make rules, making only recommendations which, because of its "fundamental common-sense background" clubs followed.

== Road Time Trials Council ==
As the sport flourished during the 1930s, the council reviewed its constitution in 1937, opening membership to all clubs and changing its name to the Road Time Trials Council, RTTC. Its first recorded meeting was at the Devereau hotel in The Strand, London, on 16 November 1937. The first committee was Maurice Draisey (chairman), E. E. Stapley, E. F. Cash, W. S. Gibson, H. Parker, A. Shillito, Alec Glass, W. Frankum, A. Reeder, Bill Mills and Alex Josey. The rules were written by Glass, Josey, Mills and Draisey. The first general meeting, in spring 1938, resulted in its secretary, Stapley, being disqualified from re-election, even though "he had worked like a slave to create the new body on thoroughly democratic lines." Clubs in Yorkshire then broke away, dissatisfied with the RTTC's national control, and set up their own regional body. It lasted only briefly.

In the RTTC's first year there were 429 races. In December the membership was 434 clubs, with a further 69 proposed. It sold 5,564 handbooks.

=== Opposition to massed road racing ===
Although started to thwart the NCU's ban on racing on the road, time-trialling acquired a respectability which not only led the NCU to recognise it but for time-trialling to become a cornerstone of British racing.

However, British cycling split during the Second World War when British League of Racing Cyclists (BLRC) enthusiasts for massed racing on the open road organised a race from Llangollen to Wolverhampton against the rules of the NCU. The NCU banned those who organised and took part in it, and the RTTC, because it recognised the NCU's suspension, did the same.

"Like the NCU, the RTTC feared that massed racing would endanger the position of all cyclists. (Note: Massed racing on the road was neither legal nor illegal. There was no legal stance. Time trials, being lone races against the clock, were widely considered legal. The RTTC feared not only for the wider position of cyclists but that if laws were passed and organisers had to ask for police permission to hold a time trial, the police would gain a power to say no that they did not currently have.) The RTTC's position, however, was hindered by its decision to stop all racing at the outbreak of war - a decision quickly changed - and to stop elections to its national committee until the war ended. The committee re-elected itself for four successive years."

The RTTC came to recognise that massed racing existed even if it did not approve, and other restrictions gradually relaxed: for example, clothing regulations became impracticable during fabric shortages in the Second World War. But the RTTC continued to insist that races were run in secret. (Note: It is doubtful that even from the start the police were unaware.) This led it to ban a proposed race from Paris to London in 1947. The NCU's ban on massed road racing meant the stage from Folkestone to London had to be a time trial, but the RTTC said advance reports about the race would be against its rules and refused to approve it. The sponsor, the News Chronicle, refused to back a race it could not report was happening. Compromise was reached when the newspaper, the NCU and the RTTC agreed to say that a time trial stage would be held from Folkestone to London but they and the cycling press were obliged to keep the start and finish lines secret.

In 1951 the RTTC said, in a statement of around 3,500 words headed The Council's Statement on the Menace of Mass Start Racing on the Highway:

Bunched racing is an utterly selfish and irresponsible use of roads; the policy of the Council is that all such racing should be stopped; the ringleaders and their associates of the BLRC have only financial gain as their motive; unsuspecting commercial concerns and newspapers have been given a distorted story about road racing; BLRC road races violate every one of the principles of clean amateurism, authenticity, and regard for public safety.

A leader in the weekly magazine, The Bicycle, called the statement "sheer balderdash and offensive writing" and "a disgusting attack on the constitution, officials and members of the British League of Racing Cyclists, and of course, the repeated assurance that the RTTC can do no wrong."

The rivalry between the BLRC and the NCU continued until they merged in 1959 to form the British Cycling Federation (today British Cycling). The BCF accepted road racing, and controlled all competitive cycling other than time-trialling, which remained with the RTTC.

== Recent history ==
Events are no longer secret; lists of riders in major events are frequently published in the cycling press and on websites. Far from wearing black, riders are now urged to wear bright clothing to make themselves visible on busy roads. Early morning starts remain common, however, but for the benefit of light traffic rather than secrecy.

In 2002 Cycling Time Trials, a company limited by guarantee, was established as a corporate body for the RTTC.

== Course codes ==
Each course has a code, for example Q10/25. In this case, the letter represents the district, the first number the course number and the second number the course distance in miles. In other districts, after the district letter, the code may be just a course number - for example, V212. The abbreviation "HC" is used for Hillclimbing instead of a distance.

Area Codes
Code	Area
A	Central
B	East
C	Lincolnshire
D	Liverpool (including Isle of Man)
E	London East
F	London North
G	London South
H	London West
J	Manchester
K	Midlands
L	North
M	North East
N	South-east Midlands
O	North Midlands
P	South (including Channel Islands)
Q	South-east
R	South Wales
S	South-west
T	Teesside
U	West
V	Yorkshire
W	Scotland
Y	National
