= Cycling Weekly =

Cycling magazine and website

- Cover of 21 November 2024 issue
- Editor: Simon Richardson (Magazine), Michelle Arthurs-Brennan (Website), Anne-Marije Rook (North America)
- Categories: Sport magazine and website
- First issue: 24 January 1891
- Company: Future plc
- Country: United Kingdom
- Language: English
- Website: cyclingweekly.com
- ISSN: 0951-5852

Cycling Weekly is the world's oldest cycling publication. It is both a weekly cycling magazine and a news, features and buying advice website. It is published by Future. It used to be affectionately referred to by British club cyclists as "The Comic".

== History ==
Cycling Weekly was first published by Edmund Dangerfield as Cycling on 24 January 1891. It briefly became Cycling and Moting in the 19th century when car-driving – "moting" – looked like it would replace cycling. Falling sales during the editorship of H.H. (Harry) England, who took what was considered to be a traditional view of cycling and opposed the reintroduction of massed racing on the roads as proposed by the British League of Racing Cyclists, led to the appearance in the 1950s of a rival weekly called The Bicycle and of a monthly entitled first Coureur and then Sporting Cyclist. Both eventually merged with Cycling.

The title has changed hands on several occasions. It was first published by the Dangerfield Printing Company (1891–1894), then Temple Press (1895–1964), Go Magazine (1964–1967) and Longacre Press (1967–1970) before being published by its next owner IPC Magazines (later known as TI Media) from 1970 to 2020.

The magazine's longest-lasting contribution to the sport was the creation on 4 April 1930 of the British Best All-Rounder (BBAR) competition for individual time triallists, establishing the rider the magazine considered the best against the clock by averaging competitors' speeds over 50 and 100 miles and 12 hours. It offered a trophy to the winner each year and a shield for the winning team.

In 1932 Cycling also introduced the Golden Book of Cycling. Each page honoured a cycling hero. The first was Frank Southall, who had won that year's BBAR competition and signed his page before 7,000 cyclists attending the BBAR prize-giving at the Royal Albert Hall, London. The book has fallen out of fashion in recent years.

== Early campaigns ==
The magazine was aware from the start of the danger it perceived cyclists to be in from the growing number of cars and trams. The magazine did not care for insistence that cyclists display a back light, which it felt moved responsibility for avoiding an accident from the overtaking driver to the cyclist being overtaken. But it had other puzzles to consider, following the prosecution of a cyclist who had hung a Chinese lantern from his machine.

Cycling campaigned against women's racing and refused to publish results and then, in the 1940s, stood out against the British League of Racing Cyclists in its campaign to reintroduce massed racing to open roads. It called the organisation's first race "A hopeless revolt."

== The modern magazine ==
Looking for more sales and advertisers in June 1957, Cycling introduced pages dedicated to mopeds and the magazine changed its name to Cycling & Mopeds. The move accelerated the decline in sales until, under the insistence of a new editor, Alan Gayfer, mopeds were abandoned and the magazine widened its outlook to all forms of racing on the road, on the track, to cyclo-cross and to cycle-touring. Among those taken on by Gayfer and who have remained in cycling journalism are the television commentator Phil Liggett and the author Les Woodland.

Alan Gayfer left Cycling in 1969 to work for the United Press news agency on the other side of Fleet Street, London, where Cycling then had its offices. There he could also report his other love: boxing. He died of a heart attack while cycling in Canada after retirement. Gayfer was succeeded by Ken Evans, whose interest in short-distance time-trialling led to a parallel competition to the British Best All-Rounder: the Campagnolo Trophy for races over 25 miles (40 km). It lasted only two seasons before it was considered not worth the effort and expense. Evans resigned to work with the components wholesaler, Ron Kitching. Evans was replaced by Martin Ayres. He in turn was followed by Andrew Sutcliffe, who had been editor of Cycle Trader. Under Sutcliffe the magazine took on a stronger pictorial content and reporting of domestic cycling, especially where it didn't concern racing, was lessened in favour of coverage of continental racing. Sutcliffe left to help form a company called Cabal Communications, run by other former IPC staff. Cabal introduced a monthly magazine called Procycling as a rival to IPC's own monthly publication, Cycle Sport. Its first editor was William Fotheringham, who had also been on IPC's staff. Sutcliffe's replacement was Robert Garbutt, who was editor until 2015 when current editor Simon Richardson was promoted from deputy editor. Significant members of staff have included Sid Saltmarsh – deputy editor under Alan Gayfer – who worked formerly for the News Chronicle and the BBC and who was reporting the Tour de France when the English rider Tom Simpson died during the race in 1967. Recent columnists have included Tony Bell, and Michael Hutchinson.

The magazine has hosted the work of what are believed to be two of the longest-serving contributors in publishing history. Frank Patterson was an illustrator whose impeccable drawings first appeared in a November issue in 1893. His last illustration appeared in 1952. Patterson was known for his meticulous treatment of the bicycle, especially the elusive ellipses, and his ability to capture different species of trees. It was said a Patterson Oak could never be mistaken for an Elm. His pen of choice was a Gillott 303. Patterson's length of service was eventually beaten by cartoonist Johnny Helms who had a simple, but unmistakable style. His cartoons were a regular fixture of the magazine from 6 February 1946 until his death in November 2009 and perfectly captured the idiosyncrasies of British club life, especially time trialling, a cyclists domestic life and his infamous cyclist-hating dog.

In 2020, Cycling Weekly owner TI Media was acquired by Future plc, adding a title to Future's cycling division together with CyclingNews.com and former rival Procycling (which Future had reacquired from Immediate Media a year earlier after selling them in 2014). Procycling ceased publication in January 2022.

== See also ==
- Cyclingnews.com
- VeloNews
