= Eileen Sheridan (cyclist) =

English cyclist (1923–2023)

Constance Eileen Sheridan (née Shaw, 18 October 1923 – 12 February 2023) was an English cyclist who specialized in time trialing and road record-breaking. She broke all the records of the Women's Road Records Association during the late 1940s and 1950s. They included Land's End to John o' Groats, previously held by Lilian Dredge.

== Amateur career ==
Eileen Sheridan, 4 ft 11in (150 cm) tall as an adult and described by historian Bernard Thompson as "a dainty lady", was an athletic girl at school in Coventry, where she was born Constance Eileen Shaw in 1923. Cycling dominated other sports at the age of 15 and in 1944 she joined the Coventry Cycling Club. There she went touring and joined club rides without being interested in racing. She said: "It is on club runs that the club spirit is found, if they have a spirit at all, and retained for all time. Coventry club runs number among the happiest moments in my life." She rode her first race, an informal 10-mile (16 km) time trial, in mid-1940 and finished in 28m 30s "to the great amazement of the club as well as myself." She intended to race formally that summer but the event she entered was canceled. She began racing instead in 1945. Her first race was a 25-mile (40 km) time trial run by the Birmingham Time Trial Association and she was seeded to start first. She hoped to ride 1h 15m and finished in 1h 13m 34s, breaking her club's record and winning the event.

She then won the national time trial championship at 25 miles (40 km), saying she "rode as never before." She married Ken Sheridan in 1942 and gave birth to their son, Clive, in April 1946. She started cycling again seven weeks later and within five months won a club time trial.

She reduced her 50-mile (80 km) time to 2h 22m 53s in 1947 and rode 25 miles (40 km) in 1h 7m 35s. She won the Birmingham and Midland track championship. She moved to a conventional racing bike on her 25th birthday in 1948 and, in the words of The Bicycle, "rocked the racing world, setting up completely new standards for women's records."

She won the women's British Best All-Rounder time trial competition in 1949 and 1950. Her ride in the Yorkshire Cycling Federation 12-hour race in September 1949 set a national record with 237.32 miles (381.93 km). Only four men bettered her distance, the winner of the men's event, Des Robinson, by only six miles (9.6 km). She also took national championships at 50 and 100 miles (80 and 160 km) in 1950. She broke records at 30 miles/48 km (1948: 1h 19m 28s), 50 miles/80 km (1949 and 1950: 2h 14m 16s), 100 miles/160 km (1950: 4h 37m 53s) and 12 hours (1949: 237.62 miles/382.41 km). But her time for 25 miles (40 km) never fell below 1h 5m; she said it took her at least that far to get warmed up.

She was awarded the Bidlake Memorial Prize in 1950 "for creating a new high standard in women's cycle racing with an outstanding series of three championships and five record performances on the road in 1950."

== Professional career ==
Hercules Cycle and Motor Company signed her in 1951 for three years to break distance and place-to-place records. These included in 1954, the 12-hour record where she covered 250 and a half miles (403.1 km) and the 24-hour record in 446 and a half miles (718.6 km). She broke all 21 of the women's records by large margins and held all 21 W.R.R.A. records in 1955. As of 2024, four have yet to be beaten, including the London-Edinburgh record of 20h 11m 35s, set in 1954. Her 1,000-mile (1609 km) record of 3 days and 1 hour stood for 48 years until it was broken in 2002 by Lynne Taylor.

=== Land's End – John o'Groats ===
In June 1954, Sheridan reduced Marguerite Wilson's record for Land's End to John o' Groats, from the southwestern tip of England to John o 'Groats (the northernmost part of mainland Scotland actually being Dunnet Head), to 2 days, 11 hours and 7 minutes. She rode the first 470 miles (756 km) to Carlisle without a break, stopping to attach lights and change into wet weather clothing when it started to rain. The rain and high winds slowed her progress through the Scottish Borders. Despite this, her time was over 11 hours faster than Wilson's professional record, and just under seven hours quicker than the amateur record set by fellow Coventry native Edith Atkins the previous year. After reaching John O'Groats, Sheridan had a break for less than two hours, and then continued riding, as Hercules wanted her to set a new 1,000-mile (1609 km) record as well. After another two breaks and a meal of fried eggs and bacon, she completed the 1,000 miles (1609 km) in three days and one hour, smashing the women's record and finishing two hours and twenty minutes down on the record men's time.

Cycling historian Ramin Minovi said: "Hercules supplied the most bizarre support vehicle ever seen until the Mad Max movies. A caravan was strapped to a vast Bedford low-loader, and a large toilet ostentatiously installed on the front. Access to the monster was via a ladder, and when Eileen needed a comfort break, then the whole world knew about it. Her hands were blistered because there was no padding on the bars, just a winding of rough tape, and she kept going on blackcurrant juice, soup, sugar and chicken legs."

The bicycle she used is on display in Coventry Transport Museum, along with papers, other equipment, trophies and medals relating to Sheridan's career. It carries the Hercules name but was made under contract by another supplier because, Minovi said, "Hercules' frames were so heavy."

=== Disallowed record ===
The Women's Road Records Association disallowed her attempt on the Land's End to London record, in 1952, because the Daily Mirror had published a story announcing her attempt. The association's rules forbade publicity before a ride. She had beaten the record by 23 minutes.

== Life after racing ==
In 1952 she was featured in a documentary film made by Dunlop called Spinning Wheels: Cycle Sport '50s Style. The film also featured Reg Harris, Ken Joy and Cyril Peacock as well as scenes from the Tour de France. In 1955 she was featured in an advertisement for Player's cigarettes. She was a Life Member and President of the Coventry Cycling Club, and was also Vice President of Roads Records Association. Finally, in 1955, at the end of her professional career, she had her daughter, Louise. After ending her racing career, Sheridan remained active as a spokesperson for cycling. She was inducted to the British Cycling Hall of Fame in 2016.

Sheridan was a longtime resident of Isleworth. Her husband, Ken Sheridan, died in 2012 after 70 years of marriage, and she died at her home on 12 February 2023, at the age of 99.

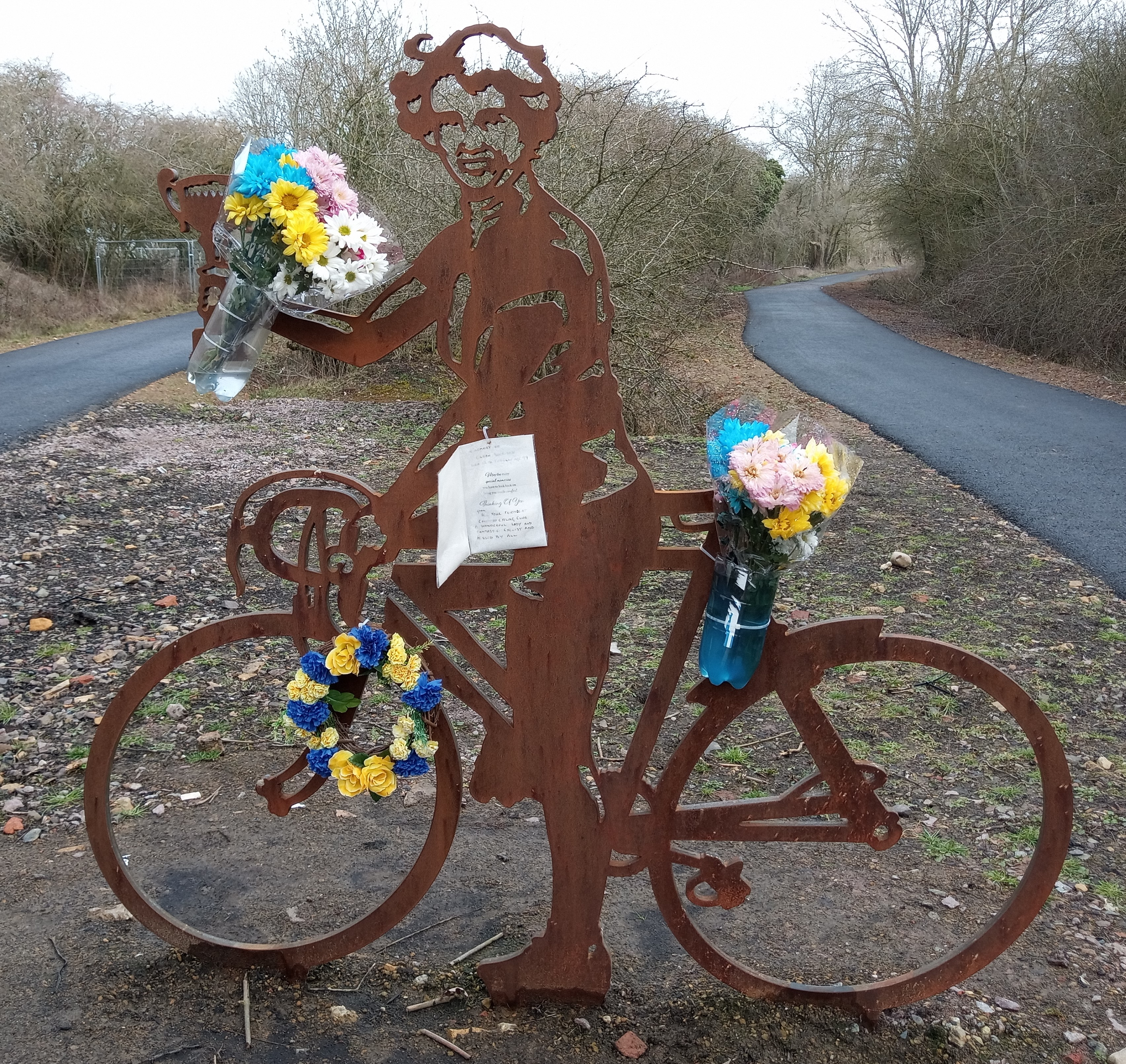
Eileen Sheridan steel sculpture on Lias Line in Warwickshire

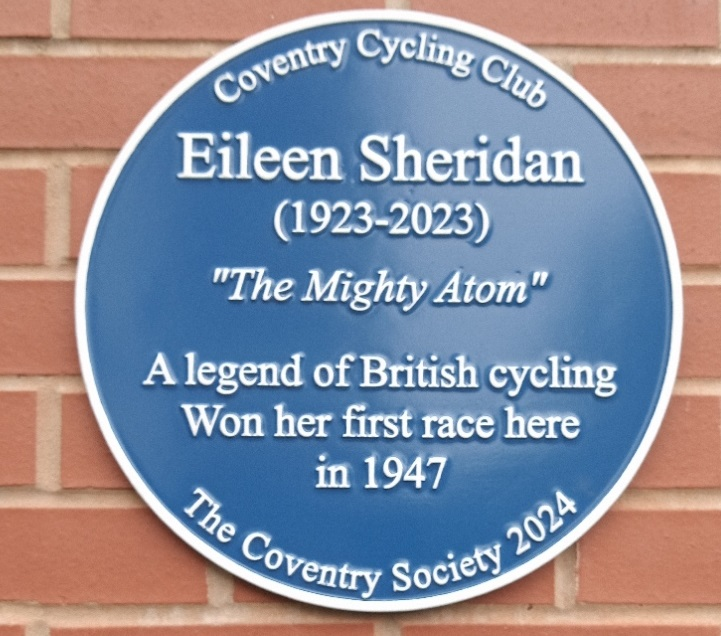
Blue Plaque commemorating Eileen Sheridan's first race win.

== Memorial ==
Sheridan has been commemorated by a steel sculpture installed on the Lias Line greenway in Warwickshire as part of The Portrait Benches project in recognition of Her Late Majesty Queen Elizabeth II’s Platinum Jubilee year.

== Blue Plaque ==
On 21 October 2024 a blue plaque was unveiled at Butts Park Arena in Coventry commemorating Sheridan's first race win. Butts Park Arena was formerly the site of Coventry velodrome which closed in 2000.

== Eileen Sheridan Archive ==
The Veteran-Cycle Club hold an archive of material relating to Sheridan.

== Assessment ==
The cycling historian Bernard Thompson wrote:

The 100-mile (160 km) championship was introduced in 1950 and won by Eileen Sheridan, Coventry CC, with 4h 37m 53s. The reign of Eileen Sheridan had begun some five years earlier when in 1945 she won the 25-mile (40 km) title with 1h 8m 38s, and although there had been many highly talented women time-triallists throughout the early years of the sport, it was Eileen Sheridan who set about pushing out the frontiers of women's records to the point of almost complete domination. [She] was a dainty lady and belied her strength and stamina. It was written in 1950 after Eileen Sheridan's second successive Best All-rounder championship that "It may well be that Eileen Sheridan will go down in cycling history as the greatest of all women riders."

Adolphe Abrahams, considered to be the founder of British sports medicine, described Sheridan as "a human machine of the highest grade capable of superlative performance".

== Bibliography ==
- Hilton, T. (2005), One More Kilometre And We're in the Showers, ISBN 0-00-653228-4
- Woodland, L. (2005), This Island Race, Mousehold Press, ISBN 1-874739-36-6
- Wonder Wheels; The Autobiography of Eileen Sheridan. (1956), Reprint 2009: ISBN 978-1-903088-49-4
- Whitfield, Peter, (2006), "Eileen Sheridan: a Cycling Life", out of print
- Whitfield, Peter, (2007), "12 Champions", out of print
