= Edith Atkins =

Personal information
- Full name: Edith Atkins
- Born: 2 February 1920 Bilston, England, United Kingdom
- Died: 28 August 1999(age 79) Ryton-on-Dunsmore, England, United Kingdom

Cycling career
- Sport: Cycling
- Discipline: Road
- Role: Rider

Amateur teams
- ? – 1937: Coventry Meteor Road Club
- 1938–1999: Coventry Road Club (1938 onwards)

Major wins
- Land's End to John o' Groats record

Edith Atkins (2 February 1920 – 28 August 1999) was a racing cyclist and a prolific breaker of long-distance records in the 1950s. She completed 12 different record-breaking journeys. The records included Land's End to John o' Groats; Land's End to London; Holyhead to London; London to York, London to Edinburgh; and London to Great Yarmouth. On 12 July 1953 she covered 422 miles (679 km) in 24 hours, breaking the London to York; 12-hour, and London to Edinburgh records along the way. Two weeks later she also broke Land's End to John o' Groats. She died aged 79 when she was hit by a motorist while pushing her bicycle across a pedestrian road crossing.

== Early life ==
Edie Atkins, born Sharman, in Bilston, Staffordshire, England, was less than 5 feet (1.5 m) tall. Her light build led her to take up gymnastics as a child and she excelled to champion level. Her first bicycle was one won by her mother in a whist drive. She took up cycling seriously when Roland (Ron) Atkins lent her a bicycle for a weekend ride and she discovered her ability. She moved from the Coventry Meteor Road Club to join Coventry Road Club in 1938 and the couple married two years later, Ron having acknowledged that she could ride faster than him. World War II ended thoughts of racing. One of their two children, John Atkins, was an international cyclo-cross rider and national champion.

== Racing career ==
Atkins began racing in 1946, riding for Coventry Road Club. She competed at many RTTC championship events, helping it win the team prize in the 50-mile (80 km) races of 1949 and 1950 as well as the 25-mile (40 km) championship in 1950. There was rivalry between her and another rider from the city, Eileen Sheridan. Sheridan was supported as a professional record-breaker by the Hercules bicycle company but Atkins remained an amateur, remortgaging her house to pay for her cycling.

In 1952 she broke the Women's Road Records Association Land's End to London record, completing 287 miles in 17h 13m 31s.

In 1953 Atkins broke several more records including Holyhead to London, 264¼ miles in 13h 31m 57s. In her London to York ride, she broke the 195-mile (314 km) record in 9h 56m 20s before continuing north. After 12 hours she had ridden 234¾ miles. She reached Edinburgh in 21h 37m after 285 miles (459 km), going on to ride 422 miles (679 km) in 24 hours. She took three records in the same ride and was the first woman to go beyond 400 miles (640 km) in 24 hours.

Six days later she rode from Edinburgh to Glasgow and back, 88 miles in 4h 38m 56s.

Atkins set the first women's amateur record for Land's End to John o' Groats, eight days after her Edinburgh-Glasgow-Edinburgh record. She beat the professional record by 4h 48m.

Atkins was entered in the Golden Book of Cycling on 12 August 1953.

1957 saw more records broken.

== Retirement and death ==
Atkins remained an enthusiastic cyclist after her record-breaking years. She rode more than 40 races at the age of 76 and rode 100 miles (160 km) a week.

She died in August 1999, aged 79, while crossing the A45 with her bicycle at Ryton-on-Dunsmore, near Coventry.

== Palmarès ==
1952
25 September – Land's End to London, 287 miles – 17h.13m.31s.
1953
31 May – Holyhead to London, 264 miles – 13h.31m.53s
12 July – London to York, 196 miles – 9h.56m.20s
12 July – 12 hours* – 234.75 miles
13 July – London to Edinburgh, 385 miles – 21h.37m.00s
13 July – 24 hours* – 422.00 miles

19 July – Edinburgh to Glasgow and back, 88 miles – 4h.38m.56s
27–29 July – Land's End to John o' Groats, 871 miles – 2d.18h.4m.
1957
14 July – London to Gt Yarmouth, 125 miles – 6h.01m.46s
8 August – London to Bath and back, 211 miles – 11h.11m.34s
8 September – Liverpool to Edinburgh, 211 miles – 11h.02m.40s
13 October – Edinburgh to York, 196 miles – 10h.40m.24s
