= George Herbert Stancer =

George Herbert Stancer OBE (b. Pocklington, Yorkshire, England, 17 April 1878 –d. October 1962) was an English racing cyclist of the late 19th century who became one of the administrators of the British Cyclists' Touring Club (CTC) after World War I. He is commemorated by the annual juvenile 10-mile "GHS" individual time trial championship.

== Early years ==
Stancer was born in Pocklington, a village 14 miles east of York in Yorkshire. His father owned and ran the local newspaper, The Pocklington Weekly News and at 14 Stancer wrote cycling articles for it. He became a member of the Yorkshire Road Club in 1898 and remained with the club until his death. Like his friend, Frederick Thomas Bidlake, Stancer favoured the tricycle. Stancer and L.S. Leake beat the Road Records Association London-Brighton and back record on tandem tricycle in 1910, with a time of 5 hours 59 minutes 51 seconds.

== Administrator and journalist ==
He was the first president of the Tricycle Association from 1944–1950. He worked as a journalist, editor of Cycling magazine for nine years. In 1920, he took over as president of the Cyclists Touring Club at a time when membership had dwindled to 8,500. By the time he retired in 1945, membership had exceeded 50,000.

The Bicycle wrote: "The new broom, if it went to work in unspectacular fashion, swept exceedingly clean. The five-shilling [25p] subscription was doubled, and although many heads were shaken at the 'folly' of such policy, its success was never in doubt, and membership figures ascended into the fifteen, twenty, twenty-five, and thirty thousand classes."

He became president of the Road Records Association after 34 years on its executive committee. He was an opponent of the revival of massed racing on the road when it was proposed by the British League of Racing Cyclists. His fear, and that of the National Cyclists' Union, was that asking the police for permission to hold a race ended the freedom of cyclists to hold races, or at any rate lone races against the clock, without interference. Under the headline A hopeless revolt, he wrote in Cycling:

They have plunged into their dangerous experiment without regard for the consequences... I understand that the 'rebels' want to go on holding races by police permit and under police protection; and when this is withdrawn they are apparently content to put up the shutters and go out of business as promoters.... If we voluntarily place road-racing under police control, we sign its death warrant.... If we are to race on the road, for heaven's sake let us do it as free citizens, and not by permission of the police.

The cycling importer and wholesaler, Ron Kitching, said of him: "He was a very proper gentleman; he never said a wrong word or got overheated." Stancer was awarded the Bidlake Memorial Prize, one of British cycling's top honours, in 1943.

== Memorials ==
After Stancer's death, a trust fund was established to promote and encourage young cyclists. A national schools 10-mile time trial championship was instituted, adopted in 1970 by the Road Time Trials Council (today Cycling Time Trials).
