= Marguerite Wilson =

British cyclist

Personal information
- Full name: Marguerite Wilson
- Born: 4 March 1918 England
- Died: 1972

Cycling career
- Sport: Cycling
- Discipline: Road
- Role: Rider

Amateur teams
- ?–1937: Bournemouth Arrow CC
- 1938: West Croydon Wheelers

Professional team
- 1939–1941?: Hercules

Major wins
- 1939 – Land's End to John o' Groats

Marguerite Wilson (1918–1972) was a record-breaking cyclist from Bournemouth. In 1939 she broke the Land's End to John o' Groats and 1,000-mile (1,600 km) records. When World War II stopped her efforts in 1941 she held every Women's Road Records Association (R.R.A.) bicycle record. For her achievements she was celebrated in the Golden Book of Cycling and received the Bidlake Memorial Prize.

== Career ==
Wilson started racing in 1935, when she was 17. She broke three records riding as an amateur in 1938. Then in 1939 she turned professional and broke 11 records (including two of her own from 1938). The pinnacle of her year was completing the End to End ride from Land's End to John O'Groats in 2 d 22 h 52 min, continuing to complete the 1,000 miles in a record 3 d 11 h 44 min. When World War II stopped her efforts in 1941 she held all 16 Women's R.R.A. bicycle records. In her career she won over 50 medals and trophies, including the Frederick Thomas Bidlake Memorial Plaque for her End-to-End record.

== Palmarès ==
1935
1935-07-21, 10 Mile Solo Record – 29 min 14 s

1936
1936-07-26, 10 Mile Solo Record – 28 min 54 s
1936-09-05, 10 Mile Solo Record – 28 min 02 s

1937
1937-06-06, 10 Mile Solo Record – 27 min 57 s

1938
1938-06-19, 10 Mile Solo Record – 27 min 15 s

1939
1939-08-29–1939-09-02, Land's End to John O'Groats in 2 d 22 h 52 min
1939-08-29–1939-09-02, 1,000 miles in 3 d 11 h 44 min

== Honours ==
In 1939 she received the annual Bidlake Memorial Prize that has been awarded from 1934 until the present in honour of Frederick Thomas Bidlake. Her citation says:

Marguerite Wilson for her bicycle records, Land's End to John O'Groats in 2 d 22 h 52 min and 1,000 miles in 3 d 11 h 44 min accomplished in one ride, 29th August – 2nd September 1939.

On 30 April 1947 her achievements were celebrated in the Golden Book of Cycling.

== Personal life ==
Marguerite Wilson was a stewardess for British Overseas Airways Corporation (B.O.A.C) in 1948, working Short Flying boats from the Marine Airway terminal, Solent, Southampton, Hampshire.
