= Marcus Skeet =

English endurance runner and influencer

- Born: 10 February 2008 (age 18); Malton, England
- Other name: The Hull Boy
- Occupations: Endurance runner, influencer

Marcus Skeet (born 10 February 2008), known online as The Hull Boy, is an English endurance runner and influencer. In May 2025, he became the youngest person to run the length of the Great Britain.

== Early life ==
Skeet was born in Malton, North Yorkshire, on 10 February 2008. He grew up in nearby Norton-on-Derwent with his parents Philip and Jayne Skeet.

== Running ==
=== Mile-a-day challenge ===
After losing a friend to suicide, Skeet decided to raise money for the mental health charity Mind by challenging himself to run a mile a day for the entirety of April 2024. Due to his age, Skeet garnered media attention across the country, including Russ Cook, known online as Hardest Geezer. Cook, who had just become the first known person to run the latitudinal length of Africa, decided to join Skeet for the final mile of his journey. On 30 April, the duo completed the last leg of the challenge, running through Green Park, near Buckingham Palace, in London.

=== Continued philanthropy and marathon training ===
Skeet continued raising money for Mind following his challenge's completion. Ahead of running a marathon in September 2024, he received a £5,000 donation from former NFL player J. J. Watt. The marathon in question was completed alongside Russ Cook in Hyde Park, very close to where the two finished Skeet's mile-a-day challenge five months earlier.

=== Land's End to John o' Groats ===
On 1 April 2025, exactly a year after setting off on his mile-a-day challenge, Skeet began the ultramarathon of running from Land's End to John o' Groats. The 837-mile journey took him from the most southwestern point of Great Britain at Land's End, in Cornwall, England, to the most northeastern point at John o' Groats, in Caithness, Scotland. On 4 April, Skeet received support on Twitter from four-time Olympic champion Sir Mo Farah. Twenty days later, on 24 April, when running towards Warrington, Cheshire, Skeet was met by fellow ultramarathon runner Rob Pope. He was also joined on the run that day by Coronation Street actor Colson Smith. After 58 days of running, Skeet completed his journey, and in turn became the youngest person to complete the feat, and the only person to complete it whilst under 18. Not only that, but by the time he reached John o' Groats, he had raised £130,000 for Mind.

=== Pride of Britain award ===
On 22 October 2025, Skeet received the Pride of Britain Special Recognition award for his achievements.

== Personal life ==
Skeet is a boyhood supporter of association football club Hull City, reflected in his online alias. Prior to running from Land's End to John o' Groats, then-Hull head coach Rubén Sellés wrote to Skeet to show his support and respect ahead of the upcoming challenge.

In his early teenage years, Skeet was diagnosed with type 2 diabetes, depression, anxiety, and OCD. Furthermore, in 2019, his father was diagnosed with non-curable dementia. In the years since, Skeet and his mother have worked as carers for his father.

In December 2023, at only 15 years old, Skeet attempted to commit suicide. In a 2025 interview with The Guardian, he admitted that after the incident he felt "an overwhelming feeling of guilt, and regret, that [showed him] that deep down [he] still did want to be [alive]".
