= James Lawrence (triathlete) =

Ultra-endurance triathlete

James Lawrence is a Canadian athlete. He was born in Calgary, Alberta, Canada, and currently lives in Utah. He gained media attention in 2015 for setting the former world record for the most Ironman-distance triathlons completed within a single calendar year: 50. James broke that record in 2021 during the “Conquer 100” in which he completed 100 consecutive Ironman length triathlons in 100 days. He then completed one more for a total of 101 in 101 consecutive days, a record that held until it was surpassed in 2023 by Welsh athlete Sean Conway. Lawrence holds the current record for the most half-ironman distance triathlons in one year: 22, in 2011. He is married and has four daughters and one son.

Lawrence is the author of Iron Cowboy: Redefine Impossible, a memoir released on the 22nd of October 2017; centred around his 2015 consecutive Ironman-distance world record.
