= Lynne Biddulph =

English long-distance cyclist (born 1960s)

Lynne E. A. Biddulph née Taylor (born 1968 or 1969) is an English long-distance cyclist who has broken three endurance cycling records.

== Records ==
In 2000, she (as L.E.A. Taylor) and Andy Wilkinson rode a tandem bicycle from Land's End to John o' Groats (LEJOG) in 2 days, 3 hours, 19 minutes and 23 seconds, which as of June 2023 is still the record time for a mixed tandem.

She broke the LEJOG record for a female solo cyclist in 2000 and again in 2002 with a time of 2 days, 4 hours, 45 minutes, 11 seconds the latter record being unbroken for 19 years until Christina Mackenzie completed it in July 2021 in 2 days, 3 hours, 5 minutes and 27 seconds. Later in 2002, she broke the female record for the fastest 1,000 miles (1,600 km) with a time of 2 days, 16 hours, 38 mins, which as of June 2023 remains unbroken.

== Awards ==
In 2021, she was awarded a "Special" Bidlake Award, the citation reading: "For remarkably setting RRA 'Land's End to John O'Groats' solo records during both 2001 and 2002 and continuing on in 2002 to also take the 1,000 mile record"

== Events, team, and other activity ==
She has been placed in other events, including 10-mile races, 12 and 24-hour events, and in 2019, she won gold in the women's pursuit (age 45–54) team at the World Masters Track Cycling Championships. Her personal best for distance covered in 24 hours is 459 miles (739 km).

Biddulph worked in the family bicycle shop in Cannock, Staffordshire. She is a member of the BorntoBike cycling racing team.

Following the closure of the family business she moved to work at 2WheelsOnly in Tamworth, Staffordshire.
