= Frederick Thomas Bidlake =

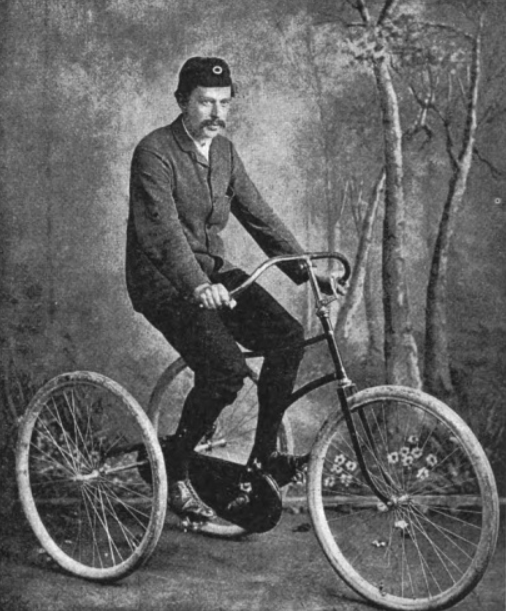
- In The Sketch, 2 August 1893
- Born: 13 March 1867; Islington, England
- Died: 17 September 1933 (aged 66); London, England
- Resting place: Golders Green Crematorium
- Occupations: Cyclist, racing administrator

Frederick Thomas Bidlake (13 March 1867 – 17 September 1933) was an English racing cyclist of the late 19th century, who became one of the most notable administrators of British road bicycle racing during the early 20th century. The annual Bidlake Memorial Prize was instituted in his memory. He was a timekeeper in cycling, motorcycling and for seaplane races in the 1930s.

== Early life ==
Frederick Thomas Bidlake was born in Islington on 13 March 1867.

== Racing cyclist ==
Bidlake favoured the tricycle, winning championships and setting national records, often beating bicycle riders. In 1893, he set a 24-hour tricycle record of 410 miles (660 km) at Herne Hill velodrome in south London that still stood when he died. At one time, he held all national tricycle records from 50 miles (80 km) to 24-hour, plus place-to-place records, and records on the tandem tricycle. As a member of the North Road Cycling Club he helped organise a rebel individual time trial, on 5 October 1895, at a time when the National Cyclists' Union had banned racing on roads.

Bidlake's Road Record Association records:

- 1889 100 miles (160 km) tricycle 6h 55m 58
- 1889 London to York tricycle 18h 28m
- 1890 24-hour tricycle 289 miles (465 km)
- 1892 London to York tricycle 15h 28m
- 1892 London to York tricycle 13h 19m
- 1893 24-hour tandem tricycle with Monty Holbein 333 miles (536 km)
- 1894 50 miles (80 km) tricycle 2h 22m 55s
- 1894 12-hour tricycle 194.5 miles (313.0 km)
- 1894 12-hour tandem tricycle with Holbein 181.5 miles (292.1 km)
- 1894 24-hour tricycle 356.5 miles (573.7 km)
- 1895 100 miles (160 km) tricycle 5h 15m 57s

== Cycling administrator ==
Bidlake helped found the Road Records Association and the Road Racing Council (forerunner of today's Cycling Time Trials, the organisation which regulates time trials in the UK), and was vice-president of the Cyclists' Touring Club alongside president George Herbert Stancer. He also timed many time-trials and record attempts over 40 years.

== Founding of time-trials ==
The early position of cyclists on the road wasn't certain and in July 1878 parliament came close to passing an amendment of the Highways Act by which cyclists would have been banned from the road. The position of cycle racing was still less certain.

The custom was for racers to shelter behind pacers, whose job was to "bring on" their riders, in the phrase of the time. On 21 July 1894, Bidlake was one of 50 in a 50-mile (80 km) race on the main road north out of London. He and another rider, Arthur Ilsley, and their two pacers, were passing a woman with a horse when the horse reared and both riders crashed into a ditch. The greatest damage was to the bicycles, but the woman complained to Huntingdonshire police that such races should not take place. The National Cyclists Union, fearing action in Huntingdonshire could spread across the country and lead to another attempt to amend the Highways Act, banned its clubs from racing on the road and ordered them to compete on the track instead.

Not all riders lived near a track or wished to race there. They set up a rival body, the Road Racing Council, and on 5 October 1895 Bidlake was one of the members of the North Road club who organised a race against the clock. Les Bowerman, who researched this and races that followed, said:

What distinguished them from earlier unpaced races was that the riders started at intervals of two or three minutes in reverse handicap order, the fastest first. Company riding was not forbidden but was unlikely to occur. This would then be very similar to a time-trial as we know it.

The fact, as Bowerman says, there were unpaced races against the clock before the North Road event in October 1895 means Bidlake can not, as he often is, be described as the founder of time-trialling. Bernard Thompson, a historian of British time-trialling, wrote:

Neither the Road Time Trials Council or the Road Racing Council before them can claim to have invented time-trialling. Without question, time-trials took place a century ago and the National Cyclists' Union national time-trial championship time-trials are recorded in 1878 when A. A. Weir was the victor with a time of 1hr 27m 47s on a high ordinary. What the RRC did contribute was "As great a measure as possible of uniformity in the conduct of road competitions."

But he was among those who codified a sport which became the leading part of British cycle-racing, even though its officials were so uncertain of their creation that they refused to tell the police, referred to courses and dates in code, held their races in the country at dawn, demanded riders dress completely in black, and banned even the sport's own press from saying when races would be held. Lists of competitors were headed "private and confidential" until the 1960s.

Bidlake's organisation started as a rebellion from the ruling of the National Cyclists Union but it soon became an established part of cycling authority.

== Attitude to other cycling ==
Bidlake's time-trialling was a rebel's exercise against the dictates of the National Cyclists' Union, but in time the two parts of the sport collaborated. Both agreed that massed racing on the road was undesirable and placed all cyclists at risk. The Isle of Man, which being outside the United Kingdom was not subject to the NCU's ban nor in fear of British police, was proposed in 1914 as the site of a world championship road race.

Cycling quoted Bidlake as calling massed racing – the sort now seen in the Tour de France – "a superfluous excrescence." He continued: "Unpaced solitary speedmen perform magnificently, unobtrusively, with no obstructive crowds and give no offence. I can't believe that our road men want to alter all this to make a Manxman's holiday."

The First World War ended the idea.

Bidlake also objected to the way women had begun to wear knickerbockers to ride a bicycle. He said: "A skirtless lady on tour is bound to suffer much. She is singularly conspicuous, a centre of observation and exposed to such contumelious ridicule as the ordinary sensitive feminine nature hesitates to provoke.". Women who wore other than skirts to ride a bicycle called what they wore Rational Dress. Bidlake ridiculed it in Cycling as Laughable Dress. When the Cyclists' Touring Club defended a woman member turned away from a hotel because she was wearing it, Bidlake insisted that the CTC was defending not the outfit but the CTC's contract with the hotel (Note: The Hautboy Hotel, Ockham, Surrey, England; the woman was Florence Warburton, a leader of the Rational Dress Society. The CTC pursued the case but lost.) to serve any member of the club.

Of women racing, he said:

Cycle racing for women is generally acknowledged to be undesirable. My ideal of a clever lady rider is one who can ride far, who can ride at a really useful speed, who mounts hills with comfort, and makes no fuss or show of effort. The stylish, clever lady stops short of being a scorcher, but if women's races were to be organised, the participants would have to run to their limit, or else make a mockery of racing. And that limit is not pleasant to contemplate... the speed woman, dishevelled, grimy and graceless. I believe in a high standard of cycling ability as really worth while attaining by women, but not as racers... Imagine women dressed for speed, on bicycles built for speed, in attitudes necessary for speed, grabbing speed food, taking acid (Note: The meaning isn't clear. It may be a reference to early drugs such as strychnine, which references to the first world championship in Britain (a time-trial won by Dave Marsh of Britain) suggest was known in time-trialling at the time.) and finishing dead to the world.

== Other sports ==
Bidlake took an interest in motor sports and timed a motorcycling attempt on the Land's End to John o'Groats record by George Pilkington Mills, who already held the record on a bicycle and a tricycle. An undated news cutting says: "Mr G.P. Mills on his Raleigh motorcycle completed his run from Land's End to John o'Groats on Saturday forenoon and established a new record. He started on his long and trying journey at eight on Thursday morning, and arrived at his destination at 11 am on Saturday, after being 50h 46m 30s on the road. Mr F.T. Bidlake was the timekeeper. Mr J. Silver previously held the record, having done the distance in 64h 29m, and Mr E.H. Arnott in 65h 45m. He has not only beaten the motor cycle record, but is also nearly two hours ahead of best motor car time."

He was a timekeeper for the Royal Aero Club and in the Schneider Trophy seaplane races of the 1930s.

== Death and memorial ==
=== Golden Book of Cycling ===
The magazine Cycling created its Golden Book of Cycling in 1933 to record those whose contributions to the sport it considered outstanding. That year, 7,000 cyclists at the Royal Albert Hall in London watched Bidlake sign the first page during a concert to honour time-trialling champions. It was the last time most saw him alive.

=== Death, Bidlake Testimonial fund and Bidlake Award ===
Bidlake was riding down Barnet Hill, north of London, on Sunday 27 August 1933, when he was hit by a car. His injuries looked superficial and he managed to get home. But he lapsed into semi-consciousness and died in London on 17 September. By this time, a testimonial fund had been established; it became a memorial fund. Bidlake was cremated at Golders Green Crematorium in London.

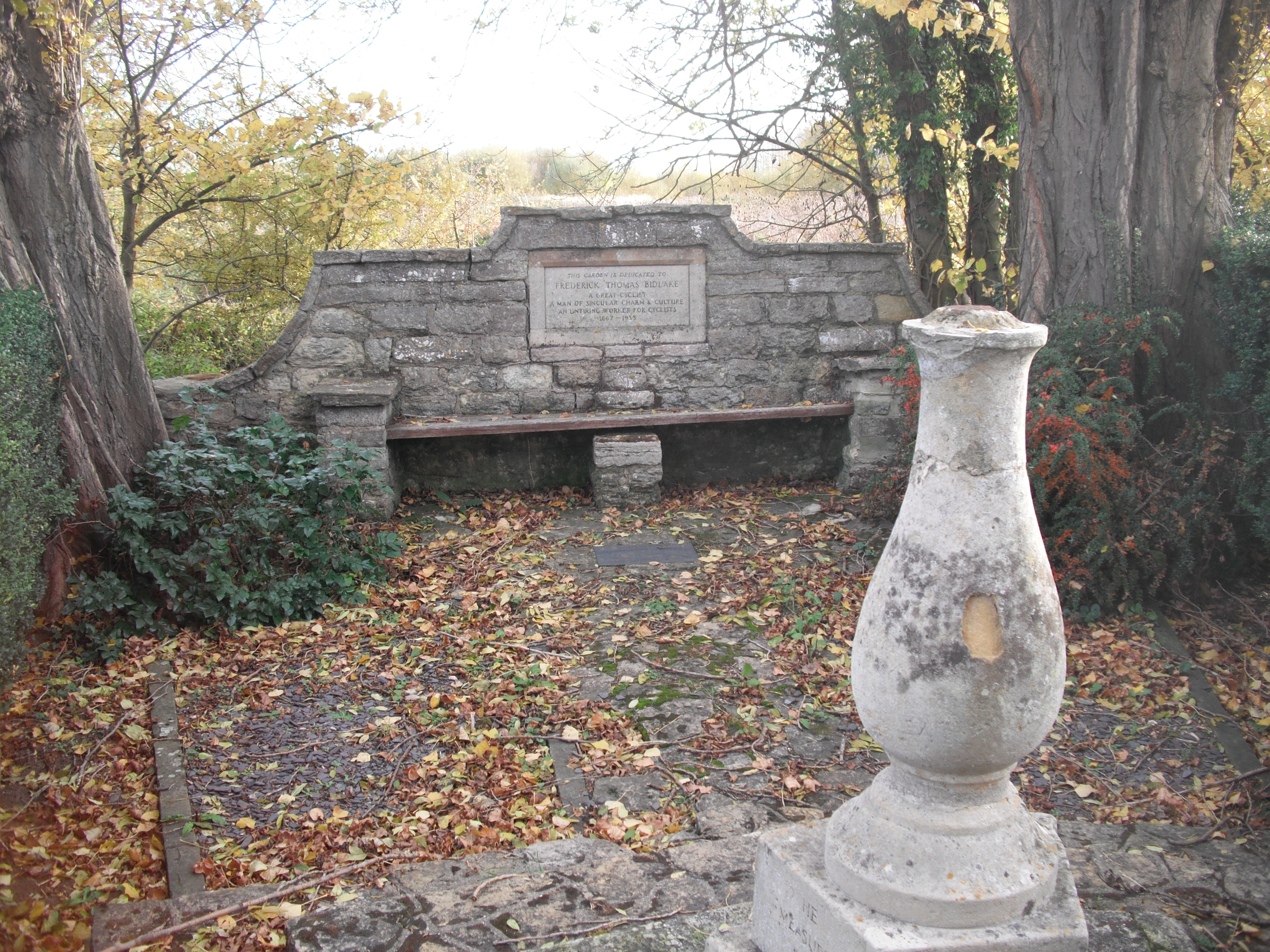
Bidlake Memorial Garden

A garden and monument, at Girtford Bridge near Sandy in Bedfordshire, was unveiled on 23 September 1934. More than 4,000 watched as W. P. Cook, president of the Anfield Bicycle Club and the Road Records Association, performed the unveiling ceremony. The rector of Sandy blessed the memorial. The garden is triangular with a wall of local stone on one side. In its centre, a stone reads: "This garden is dedicated to Frederick Thomas Bidlake, a great cyclist, a man of singular charm and character, an untiring worker for cyclists 1867–1933". A sundial in the centre of the garden is marked "He measured time". A facsimile milestone is engraved "F. T. B. Few have known this road as he. London 48 – York 148".

The balance of the fund was used to create an annual award – the Bidlake Memorial Prize – for the most outstanding performance or contribution to cycling. Several achievements during the 1950s were not marked by the committee, primarily because they involved riders from the breakaway British League of Racing Cyclists. Significant events overlooked included Brian Robinson's first British stage victory in the Tour de France in 1958 and Ian Steel's victory in the 1952 Peace Race.

Winners of the award include:

- Hubert Opperman (1934)
- Frank Southall (1935)
- Marguerite Wilson (1939)
- Reg Harris (1947 and 1949)
- Eileen Sheridan (1950)
- Beryl Burton (1959, 1960, 1967)
- Tom Simpson (1965)
- Hugh Porter (1968)
- Tony Doyle (1980)
- Chris Boardman (1992)
- Graeme Obree (1993)
- Nicole Cooke (2001)
- Lynne Biddulph (2021, special award)

=== Archive ===
Bidlake's correspondence and other papers are at the National Cycle Archive at the University of Warwick.
