= Land's End to John o' Groats =

Traversal of the length of Great Britain

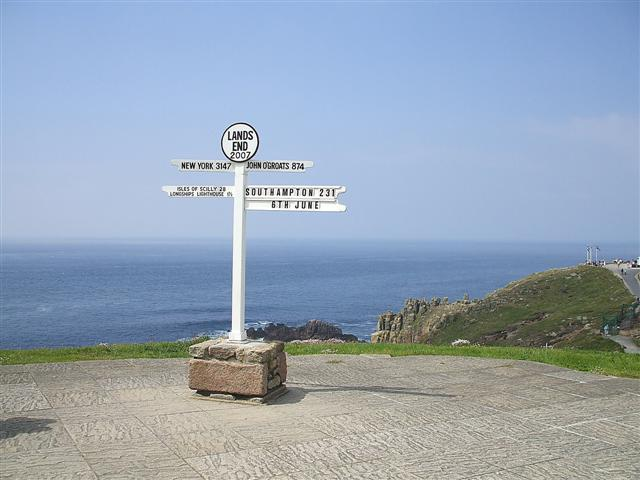
Signpost at Land's End

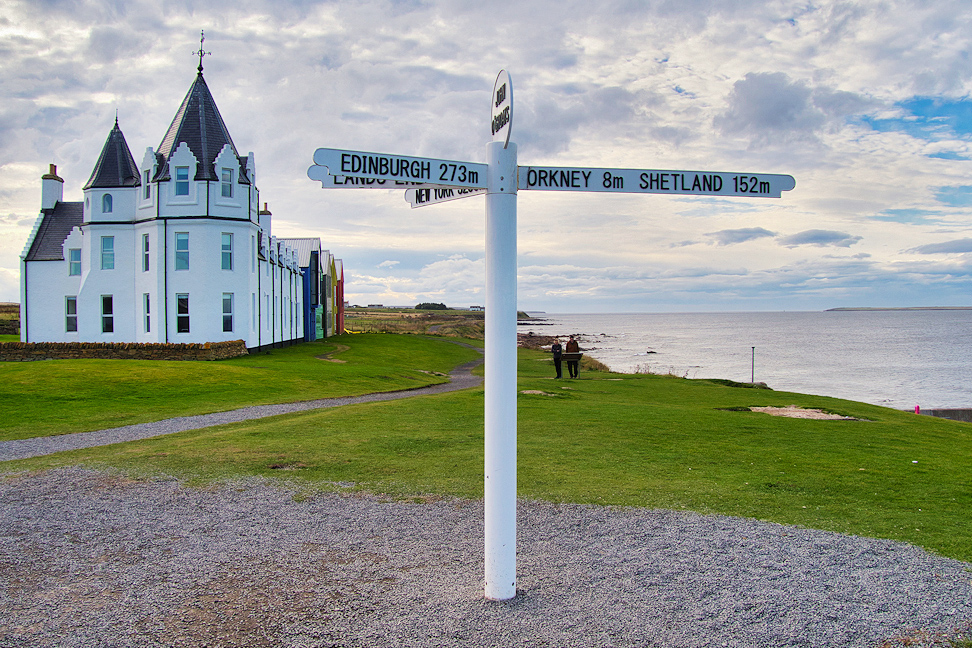
Signpost at John o' Groats

Land's End to John o' Groats is the traversal of the length of the island of Great Britain between two extremities, in the southwest and northeast. The traditional distance by road is 874 miles (1,407 km) and takes most cyclists 10 to 14 days; the record for running the route is nine days. Off-road walkers typically walk about 1,200 miles (1,900 km) and take two or three months for the expedition. Signposts indicate the traditional distance at each end.

- Land's End is the traditionally acknowledged extreme western point of mainland England. It is in western Cornwall at the end of the Penwith peninsula. The O. S. Grid reference of the road end is SW342250, Postcode TR19 7AA. In fact it, or strictly speaking Dr Syntax's Head, SW341253, a few hundred yards NW of the road end, is mainland England's most westerly point. The most southerly point is Lizard Point, about 9 miles (14 km) further south. Land's End is sometimes reckoned incorrectly as mainland Great Britain's most southwesterly point. This accolade belongs to Gwennap Head, SW365215, which is at least 2 miles (3.2 km) further south than Dr Syntax's Head but only about 1.5 miles (2.4 km) less west.
- John o' Groats is the traditionally acknowledged extreme northern point of mainland Scotland, in northeastern Caithness, O.S. Grid Reference ND380735, Postcode KW1 4YR. The actual northernmost point is Dunnet Head about 2 miles (3 km) further north. The point that is farthest by road from Land's End is Duncansby Head, about 2 miles (3 km) east of John o' Groats. Duncansby Head is also the most northeasterly point of the British mainland.

The straight-line distance from Land's End to John o' Groats is 603 miles (970 km) as determined from O.S. Grid References, but such a route passes over a series of stretches of water in the Irish Sea.

According to a 1964 road atlas, the shortest route using classified roads was 847 miles (1,363 km) but in a 2008 road atlas, the shortest route using classified roads was 838 miles (1,349 km). An online route planner in 2021 also calculated the quickest route by road as 837 miles (1,347 km), estimating a time of 14 hours 50 minutes for the journey by car (this uses the A30, M5, M6, A74(M), M74, M73, M80, M9, A9 & A99) but the overall shortest route by road, using minor roads in numerous places and utilising modern bridges, is only about 814 miles (1,310 km). This route is roughly as follows: Land's End, Bodmin, Okehampton, Tiverton, Taunton, Bridgwater, the M5 Avon Bridge, the M48 Severn Bridge, Monmouth, Hereford, Shrewsbury, Tarporley, St Helens, Preston, Carlisle, Beattock, Carstairs, Whitburn, Falkirk, Stirling, Crieff, Kenmore, Dalchalloch, A9, Inverness, Kessock Bridge, Cromarty Bridge, Dornoch Firth Bridge, Latheron, Wick, John o' Groats.

The walk can be done in either direction. The south-to-north route includes advantages such as tending to go in the direction of the prevailing winds and more temperate weather. However, the north-to-south route avoids the midge season.

== History ==
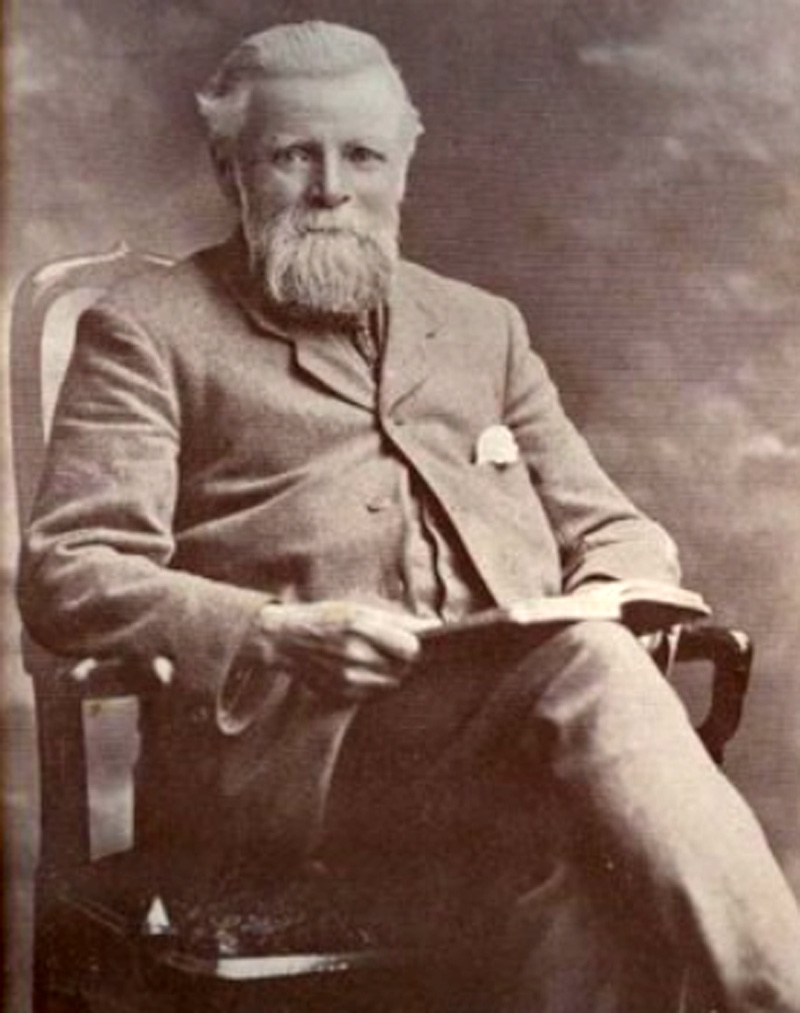
John Naylor

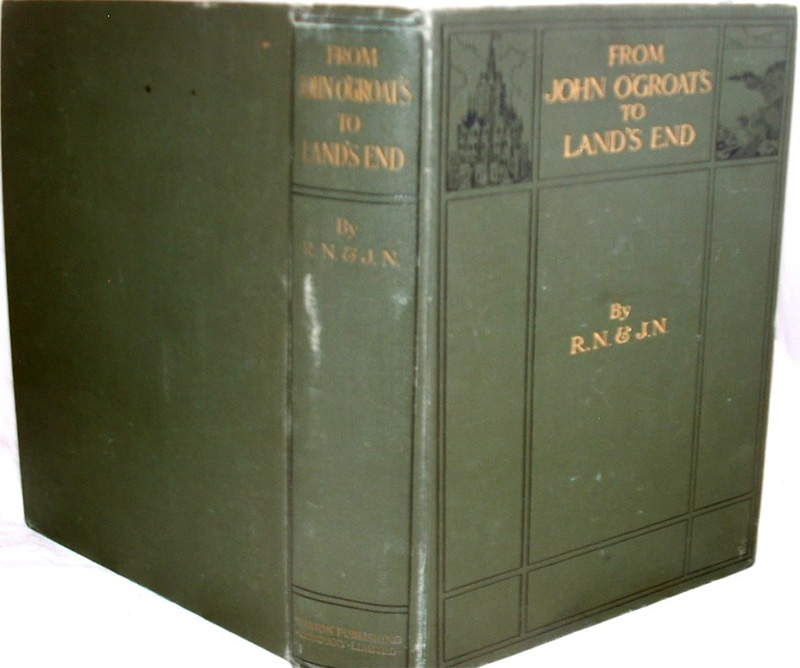
John Naylor's 1916 From John o' Groats to Lands End

The brothers John and Robert Naylor from Cheshire are credited with making the first journey from John O'Groats to Land's End in 1871 and are frequently mentioned in walking and cycling guides today. In 1916, some years after his brother's death, John Naylor wrote a book called From John O'Groats to Land's End. It has been suggested that they were influenced by two books by the American consul in Birmingham, Elihu Burritt: A walk from London to Land's End and back (1864) and A Walk from London to John O'Groat's (1865).

In the introduction to their book the Naylors wrote:

It was a big undertaking, especially as we had resolved not to journey by the shortest route, but to walk from one great object of interest to another, and to see and learn as much as possible of the country we passed through on our way. We were to walk the whole of the distance between the north-eastern extremity of Scotland and the south-western extremity of England, and not to cross a ferry or accept or take a ride in any kind of conveyance whatever. We were also to abstain from all intoxicating drink, not to smoke cigars or tobacco, and to walk so that at the end of the journey we should have maintained an average of twenty-five miles per day.

== Methods ==
There are many ways to go from Land's End to John o' Groats. Traditionally considered to be a walk, the route is now traversed in a number of ways, with cycling and multi-modal expeditions being particularly popular in recent years.

Most trips are done by individuals or small groups for personal fulfilment. Some expeditions are organised as charity fundraisers, sometimes involving celebrities: examples include cricketer Ian Botham's 1985 walk and athlete Jane Tomlinson in 2003. In recent history the route has been used as a rite of passage by cyclists taking on the most iconic cycling challenge in Britain.

=== Walking ===
The first recorded end-to-end walk (actually from John o' Groats to Land's End) was undertaken by the brothers John and Robert Naylor in 1871. Since then the walk has been undertaken many times, more particularly since 1960, after a well-publicised road walk by Dr Barbara Moore. In 1960 the entrepreneur Billy Butlin organised a road walking race, which gave further impetus to the idea.

Since the 1960s, walkers have mostly chosen off-road routes, using the growing network of long-distance footpaths. A classic account is from 1966 by the travel writer John Hillaby. Off-road walkers usually complete the journey in two to three months. There is a considerable choice of off-road routes, but all are much longer than the shortest road distance, usually 1,200 miles (1,900 km) or more. The walk is still undertaken by road walkers, often doing the walk, like Sir Ian Botham, for charity, or as a "challenge walk". They typically take a month or even less.

Some walkers aim to complete the route piecemeal, perhaps over several years, to achieve the walk within the time constraints of a working life and before the possible health problems of old age. One example of this was completed by Malcolm Wylie, when he walked north to south along the British watershed (without crossing flowing water) between 1996 and 2009, and documented it in his book; this route is much longer, at 1800 miles, as it winds between the tributaries of the rivers.

==== Routes ====
There is no continuous long-distance path from Land's End to John o' Groats. There are long-distance paths for substantial sections of the route, and where they do not exist walkers connect them by rights of way and minor roads. Most walkers broadly follow these routes:

- from Land's End to Exmoor by the South West Coast Path; or by a shorter inland route through Cornwall and Devon by minor roads and paths, the Two Castles Trail and the towpath of the Grand Western Canal
- across Somerset by parts of the Macmillan Way West, the Samaritans Way South West or the Limestone Link
- to the Peak District either by
  - an eastern route using the Cotswold Way, the Heart of England Way (or the Severn Way), the Staffordshire Way and the Limestone Way; or
  - a western route across the Severn Bridge then by the Offa's Dyke Path, the Maelor Way and the South Cheshire Way
- to the Scottish Borders by the Pennine Way
- by St. Cuthbert's Way and a section of the Southern Upland Way to the Pentland Hills, then by
  - a western route using the towpaths of the Union Canal and the Forth and Clyde Canal, then by the West Highland Way and the Great Glen Way to Inverness; or
  - an eastern route across the Forth Road Bridge to Perth and Pitlochry, then by Glen Tilt and the Lairig Ghru to Speyside and the old Wade road to Inverness.
- from Inverness to John o' Groats, either by
  - the John o' Groats Trail, a mostly coastal long-distance route that is rough but walkable;
  - a route that is mostly on roads with a few stretches of coast walking; or
  - some walkers head north west from the end of the West Highland Way at Fort William using parts of the Cape Wrath Trail, then head northeast through the Flow Country of Caithness. However, this route is through remote country and requires wild camping.

=== Cycling ===
Official Road Records Association records:

- Rider on a conventional bicycle: 43 hours, 25 minutes and 13 seconds, set by 40 year old Michael Broadwith on 17 June 2018
- Women's: Christina Mackenzie 51 hours, 5 minutes and 27 seconds, 30 July 2021
- Mixed tandem: A Wilkinson & L E A Taylor (Lynne Biddulph), 2000, 51h 19m 23s
- Men's tandem: 5–7 May 2015 Riders: Dominic Irvine and Charlie Mitchell. Time: 45 hours, 11 minutes The previous record held for 49 years.

The record for cycling from Land's End to John o' Groats is held by Andy Wilkinson, who completed the journey in 41 hours, 4 minutes and 22 seconds on a Windcheetah recumbent tricycle in 1990 (the Road Records Association does not recognise journeys on recumbents). A typical cycling time when not attempting shortest time is 10 to 14 days. From 1 to 4 March 2010, David Walliams, Jimmy Carr, Fearne Cotton, Miranda Hart, Patrick Kielty, Davina McCall and Russell Howard cycled in a team relay from John o' Groats to Land's End to raise money for Sport Relief.

Canadian Sarah Ruggins cycled from John O'Groats to Land End and back in 5 days, 11 hours and 14 minutes in May 2025. This was 6h 49m faster than the previous allcomers' return record set by James MacDonald, and five days faster than the previous women's return record held by Louise Harris.

The first tricyclist to complete the route was Alfred Nixon, champion of the London Tricycle Club, who in 1882 made "the first, and at present only, tricycle journey from John o' Groats to Land's End, a distance of 1007 miles, in a fortnight". The current Road Records Association record on a non-recumbent tricycle is two days, 5 hours and 29 minutes ridden by Ralph Dadswell in 1992.

Men's quadricycle. In the summer of 2012. Riders: Hugo Catchpole, George Unwin, Tom Bethell and Richard Nicholls. Time 10 days 15 hours. On a four-man recumbent bike weighing 114 kg.

Several cyclists have completed the route on folding bicycles. The fastest completion of LEJOG on a 16-inch wheel Brompton bicycle is currently that of James Stannard who completed the route in a time of 83 hours (3 days 11 hours) in July 2022.

There have been several unicycle completions of the journey. The Guinness World Record for the fastest completion by unicycle is held by Roger Davies and Sam Wakeling, who rode 862 miles (1,387 km) (Land's End to John o' Groats) from 12 to 18 September 2009 in 6 days, 8 hours and 43 minutes. They rode large 36-inch-wheeled (910 mm) unicycles equipped with two-speed Schlumpf geared hubs.

The record for riding from Land's End to John o' Groats on a penny-farthing had not been broken since 1886, when Victorian cyclist George Pilkington Mills set it with a time of five days and one hour. Richard Thoday broke the then 133-year-old record on 24 July 2019 by completing his ride in four days, eleven hours and fifty-two minutes. He averaged around 200 miles a day. He had undertaken the challenge to help raise £10,000 for the charity BBC Children in Need.

The oldest person to cycle from Land's End to John o' Groats is Peter Langford (UK, b. 19 August 1933) who was aged 90 years and 33 days when he completed the journey on 21 September 2023. Langford started his journey from Land's End on 22 August 2023.

In 2017 Amelia Sampson aged 22 months completed John o' Groats to Land's End in 14 days in her trailer towed by her parents riding a tandem.

At the age of 4 years and 4 months, Rhoda Jones is believed to have become the youngest to cycle Land's End – John o' Groats on 2 September 2018. Cycling on a trailerbike with her parents Katie and Tom Jones she completed the ride in 22 days, 3 hours, 26 minutes. Her sister Ruth Jones, aged 5, completed the journey before her and became the fastest on a trailerbike.

On 3 August 2018, Joshua Moisey, aged 7 years and 2 months, became the youngest Land's End – John o' Groats cyclist on a standard bicycle, riding his own bike alongside brother Reuben (10) and parents Alvin and Hiroko, and raising money for Alzheimer's Society.

On 14 August 2020, at the age of 10 years 5 months, Evangeline Towers became the youngest girl to complete the journey on her own bicycle, covering 1,020.74 miles (1,642.72 km) in 110 hours 5 minutes over 22 days with her father and uncle, raising money for Save the Children charity.

There are several annual mass participation cycle rides that go from Land's End to John o' Groats, the biggest of which is the Babble Ride Across Britain, run by Threshold Sports. The Ride Across Britain takes over 800 riders the full length of Britain, taking nine days and covering 969 miles (1,559 km), with each rider covering an average of 107 miles (172 km) per day. Previous celebrity participants include GB rower and Olympic gold medallist James Cracknell and former England Rugby captain Lewis Moody.

In April 2018, George and Beatrice Neville became the first people to cycle from John o'Groats to Lands End on Santander Hire cycles, better known as Boris bikes. It took the couple 18 days to complete.

In September 2014, Penny Burgess (née Whitmore) made the first solo unsupported ride from Lands End to John o’ Groats on an electric bike taking 14 days

=== Running ===
The record time for a runner to complete the route as certified by Guinness World Records is nine days and 2 hours by Andi Rivett in 2002, although there is significant doubt about the authenticity of this record, as Andi Rivett took a whole day (equivalent to almost 10%) off the previous record, which was set by established ultra runner Richard Brown in 1988. The fastest known time with supporting evidence is by Dan Lawson who in August 2020 completed the distance in 9 days, 21 hours, 14 minutes and 2 seconds. Lawson's record is widely regarded as the fastest known time by the ultra running community; there is a petition to have Rivett's record rescinded.

In July 2008, Dan Driver became the first to run the route solo, meaning he carried all his equipment with him whilst he ran it. He completed the run in just over 17 days.

The current women's record of 12 days, 15 hours and 46 minutes was set by Marina (Mimi) Anderson from 16 to 28 July 2008. In August 2019 the BBC reported that Sharon Gayter had completed the run four hours faster, in 12 days 11 hours 6 minutes, still to be verified by Guinness. In July 2020 GB ultra runner Carla Molinaro set a new fastest known time of 12 days, 30 minutes and 14 seconds.

Fred Hicks was an early record holder. He ran the journey between 20 and 30 May 1977 in 10 days 3 hours and 30 minutes. He ran this for charity, not aiming to set any records, and it was only later, when he was approached by the Road Running association asking if they could pursue the record with Guinness, that he became aware he had set a new record.

On 12 July 2009 British ultramarathon runner Kevin Carr successfully completed the first ever attempt to run the route off-road, becoming the first athlete to run the length of the UK as a fell/trail run. Like Driver, Carr ran unsupported and solo—a format commonly known amongst fell runners as a mountain marathon. Carr ran the challenge as part of an event organised by Benumber1, an event that saw several top-level British athletes (mainly Olympians) completing the challenge. The event was designed to encourage school students to participate in sport and to realise the benefits of a healthy lifestyle, whilst raising funds for the British Heart Foundation. The run covered 1,254 miles (2,018 km) over footpaths, bridleways, canal paths, river banks, national trails, fields, moorland and mountains. Over 80% of the route was off-road, the route resorting to tarmac only when necessary to link two trails, or where a trail passed through a village/town. The run took 6 weeks 3 days and 17 hours (including three rest days). Factoring in the rest days, this run called for an average effort of just under 30 miles (50 km) a day, every day, for more than six weeks.

In July 2011, a team of runners from Calday Grange Grammar School, Wirral completed a relay from Land's End to John o' Groats, becoming the first school to do so. They raised £200,000 for Alder Hey Children's Hospital, Liverpool.

In mid summer of 2011 Anthony Band from Surrey ran 1000 miles barefoot, all in aid for Help For Heroes. Band took 29 days, running on average 36 miles per day.

On 3 August 2014, Marie-Claire Oziem became the first female runner to complete the distance unsupported and solo. She pushed all her provisions in a pram and camped along the way. Her route consisted of both on and off-road sections. Oziem ran for the charity Mind, based in Taunton for its project Go Wild, Stay Well, which aims to support those with mental illness through the use of various green therapy schemes. She started her run on 23 June and finished on 3 August 2014, regularly running distances of over 32 miles daily.

=== By horse ===
The journey with a horse is generally completed north to south, starting in April to avoid the midges in the Highlands but also to benefit from warmer weather.

Evelyn Burnaby was the younger brother of the famous English Long Rider Colonel Frederick Burnaby. Whereas the elder brother was famous for having ridden across Central Asia and the Ottoman Empire, Evelyn decided to keep his equestrian adventures closer to home. He set off in 1892 to ride from Land's End, Cornwall to John o' Groats, Scotland. Evelyn's journey was soon serialised in a popular publication, The Country Gentleman, and was published in book form the following year as A Ride from Land's End to John O' Groats.

Preston Councillor David Ainsworth Road his horse Queenie from John o’Groats to Lands End in 1934, taking just 26 days. He was the first person to complete the journey with only one horse.

John Richard Penistan rode his horse, Billy-a-Journey from Land's End to John o' Groats in 1948 taking him 56 days. He was the second person to do the journey with just one horse.

Arthur Elliott, a veteran of the Great War, rode his horse, Goldflake, from Land's End to John o' Groats in 1955.

In 2006 the mother-and-daughter team of Vyv and Elsie Wood-Gee rode from John o' Groats to Land's End. Elsie was 13 at the time.

Former army officer Grant Nicolle continued the tradition by travelling from John o' Groats to Land's End in 2007 with Marv (solo and unsupported), taking 11 and a half weeks. Grant has published a book called 'Long Trot' through Amazon, documenting the trip.

=== Swimming ===
Sean Conway, swam the complete route from 30 June 2013 to 11 November 2013 (135 days). On 31 August 2018, this time was surpassed by the British endurance athlete, Ross Edgley, who swam the complete route in just 62 days as part of his effort to swim around the entirety of mainland Britain.

=== Stand-up paddleboarding ===
The first person to stand-up paddleboard (SUP) Land's End to John o'Groats was Cal Major, between 4 May 2018 and 2 July 2018, a total of 59 days. Major completed the journey solo and without any boat support. Her route took her along the Cornish and Devon coast into the Bristol Channel, up the River Severn and by canals to Blackpool, by sea around Cumbria and the Mull of Galloway, across the Firth of Clyde to Arran, along the whole of the Caledonian Canal, and up the coast of north east Scotland. Fiona Quinn became the first person to stand up paddleboard (SUP) Land's End to John o'Groats on an inflatable board, between 21 April and 10 July 2018. Over the 81 day expedition, she spent just 35 of those paddling, waiting out bad weather in between. Her mainly sea-based route took her up the Cornish coast, crossing the Bristol Channel to Lundy Island and on to Pembrokeshire before she paddled over to Ireland. Continuing up the east coast of Ireland she cross back over the Irish Sea to the Mull of Kintyre, through the full length of the Caledonian Canal and up the north east coast of Scotland. She also became the first woman to SUP across the Irish Sea and the first woman to complete a LEJOG triathlon, having walked and cycled the route in 2017. The first pair to stand up paddleboard (SUP) Land's End to John o'Groats were Dave Chant and Sophie Witter, between 16 July 2021 and 12 October 2021. Over the 89 day expedition entitled "SUP It & Sea", the pair paddled for 64 days with 25 days for bad weather and logistics, including losing one of their hard boards on the trip and one of their support crew testing positive for Covid amongst other logistical challenges. They took a longer 1703km than anyone else covering a mixture of sea, river and canals.

=== Wheelchair ===
The fastest time in a wheelchair was achieved in August 2009 by US Navy Pilot Rick Ryan: 8 days, 10 hours and 9 minutes.

=== Skateboard ===
The record time to complete the 980-mile (1,580 km) journey on a skateboard is 21 days, achieved by Matt Elver, Charlie Mason and Lee Renshaw, who traveled around 50 miles (80 km) per day to raise money for charity.

=== Triathlon ===
Sean Conway (swimmer) became the first person to complete a length of Britain triathlon in 2013. He traveled between Lands End and John o'Groats three times, cycling, running and swimming the route. Fiona Quinn became the first woman to complete a length of Britain triathlon in 2018. She traveled between Lands End and John o'Groats three times, cycling, walking and stand up paddleboarding the route.

=== Motoring ===
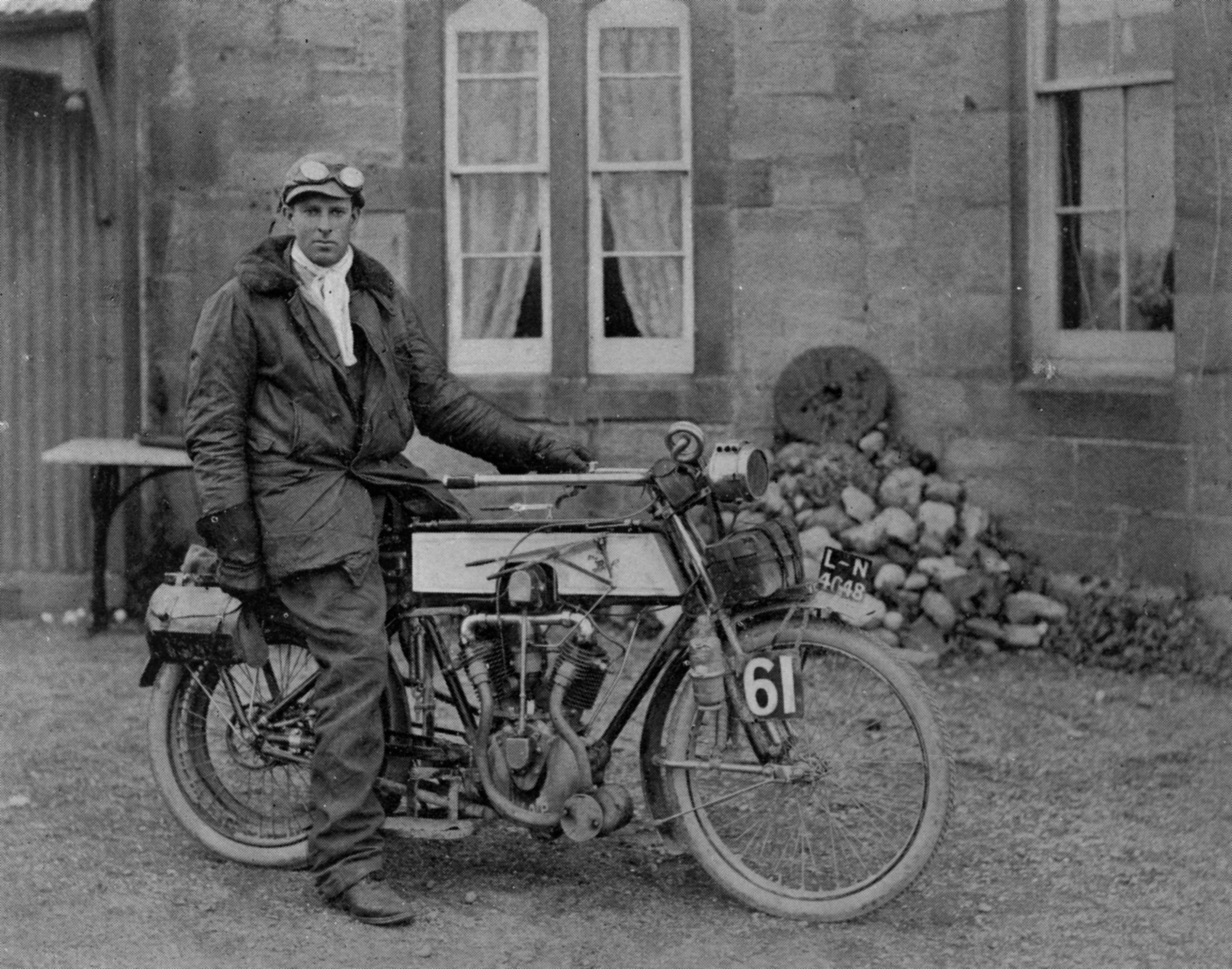
Tony Wilding at Land's End off to John o' Groats

Motoring events between the two extremities have been held since the first decade of the 20th century, when the Auto-Cycle Union (ACU) organised a series of runs for motorcycles. In 1911, Ivan B. Hart-Davies became the holder of the final Land's End to John o' Groats record for solo motorcycles. Riding his 3.5 hp single-speed Triumph, he covered the 886 miles (1,426 km) in 29 hours, 12 minutes. As his average speed exceeded the then-maximum of 20 mph, further official record attempts were banned by the ACU.

The Motor Cycling Club (which had been running the London to Land's End Trial since 1908, still held today, at least in name) put on an annual Land's End to John o' Groats Run from 1923 to 1928 which included cars as well as motorcycles. These events were also known as the End to End. In 2006, BBC Television ran a series of three programmes called The Lost World of Friese-Greene covering Claude Friese-Greene's 1920s-era road trip from Land's End to John o' Groats. The trip had originally been filmed using the Biocolour process, developed by Claude's father William Friese-Greene and the film had degraded. The original print of Claude's film was subjected to computer enhancement by the British Film Institute to remove the flickering problem inherent in the Biocolour process.

In September 1983 rally and trials driver Dennis Greenslade from Cornwall created a new sole driver non-stop (except for fuel) record drive from Land's End to John o'Groats and return using the newly released Audi 80 Quattro. The time taken was 24 hours 32 minutes. Following this record achievement which also raised £10,000 for three charities he established The Land's End - John o'Groats Association formed to authenticate all journeys between these two iconic landmarks. Since then, a number of sole drivers have allegedly completed the out-and-back trip in under 24 hours but, since the generally-accepted fastest route is 837 miles each way, that requires an average speed exceeding the 70 mph national speed limit, and also, since driving for 24 hrs without a break might be considered reckless driving, they have mostly minimised publicity.

In 1984, Neal Champion covered 884 miles (1,423 km) from John o' Groats to Land's End in 11 hours, 14 minutes, on a Kawasaki GPZ750 Turbo. In 1984, Christian Conzendorf-Mattner accompanied by Dennis Greenslade covered the route from Land's End to John o'Groats—there and back non-stop other than for fuel—in 31 hours 22 mins in a 1941 BMW 327/80. The record run was monitored by a team of journalists from a motoring magazine and is the current record for prewar classic cars end to end, non-stop, two drivers. The Land's End - John o'Groats Association awards this trophy to new record holders.

On 17 September 1988, Andrew Frankel and Mark Connaughton drove from Land's End to John o' Groats in a standard production Alfa Romeo 164 in 12 hours 30 minutes, including stops for refuelling.

In 1993, John Brown initiated the Land's End to John o' Groats Historic Reliability Trial, a race for vintage road vehicles. The race is held each December and is a tough, three-day rally for old and classic cars, built between the 1920s and 1970s. The route takes a long 1,400-mile (2,300 km) route, using remote upland roads of the west of England, Wales (during the night), the Pennines and Scotland. Medals are awarded in gold, silver and bronze categories.

On 15–16 April 1997, Hugh Edeleanu drove the route in a JCB excavator in a time of 22 hours, 10 minutes and 30 seconds.

In June 2001, Wayne Booth became the first person to do the journey by motorcycle without stopping; the 37-year-old completed the historic trip in 14 hours and 52 minutes, averaging 57 mph, on a modified 1,000cc Honda Varedero, complete with additional 74-litre petrol tank. The meticulously researched route of 854 miles (1,374 km) passed through just two sets of traffic lights and was completed within all highway regulations, law and speed limits. Booth and the dozen strong support team raised over £1,000 for The National Childbirth Trust and Macmillan Cancer Relief.

On 22 May 2011, Kevin Sharpe and David Peilow completed the first end-to-end run from John o' Groats to Land's End in an electric car over two days, using only charging stations available to the general public, in a Tesla Roadster sports car.

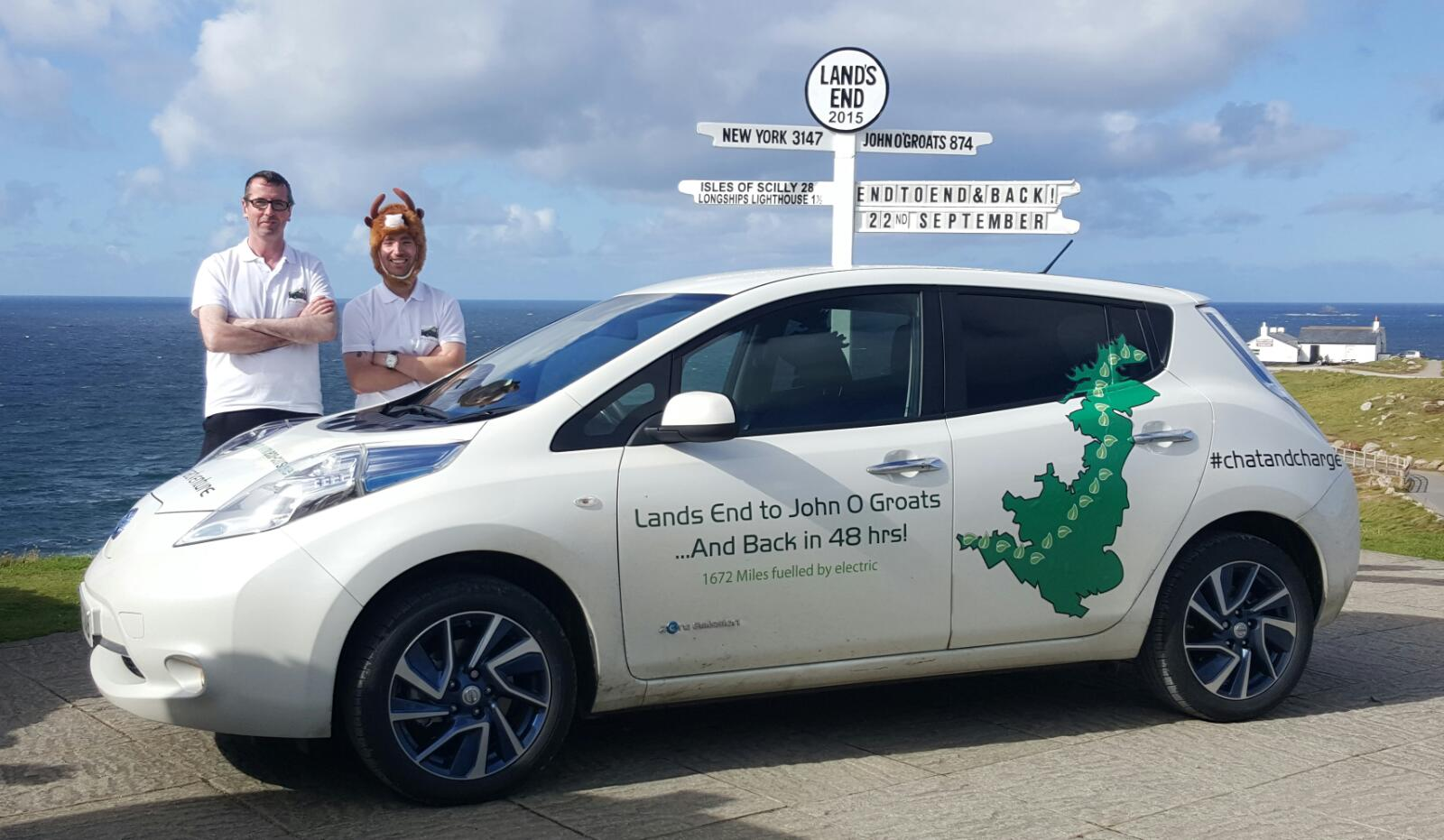
Jonathan Porterfield and Chris Ramsey at Land's End in a Nissan leaf

On 7 August 2011, Darren Whitehead & Tony Dwight travelled 1,071 miles (1,724 km) from John o' Groats to Land's End (including crossing the Welsh border) in 5 days using two ride-on Wheel Horse lawn mowers. They also raised money for charity during the trip which was named The Lawn Way Down.

On 30 November 2013, Lucy Grogan, travelling on a BMW GS R1200 motorbike, and her father Martin Grogan, travelling in a Mini Cooper Works, travelled from Land's End to John o' Groats in 19 hours, leaving Land's End at 4:30am and arriving at John o' Groats at 11:30pm same day. This was in aid of Safe Haven Children's Trust and raised £3,000 for the non-governmental organisation.

In September 2015, Jonathan Porterfield and Chris Ramsey beat the record in a Nissan Leaf electric car, using the existing public rapid charger infrastructure to travel there and back. The route south took 28 hours and 38 minutes, and the return trip 27 hours and 46 minutes. They submitted an application to Guinness World Records to have the quicker time recognised as a record.

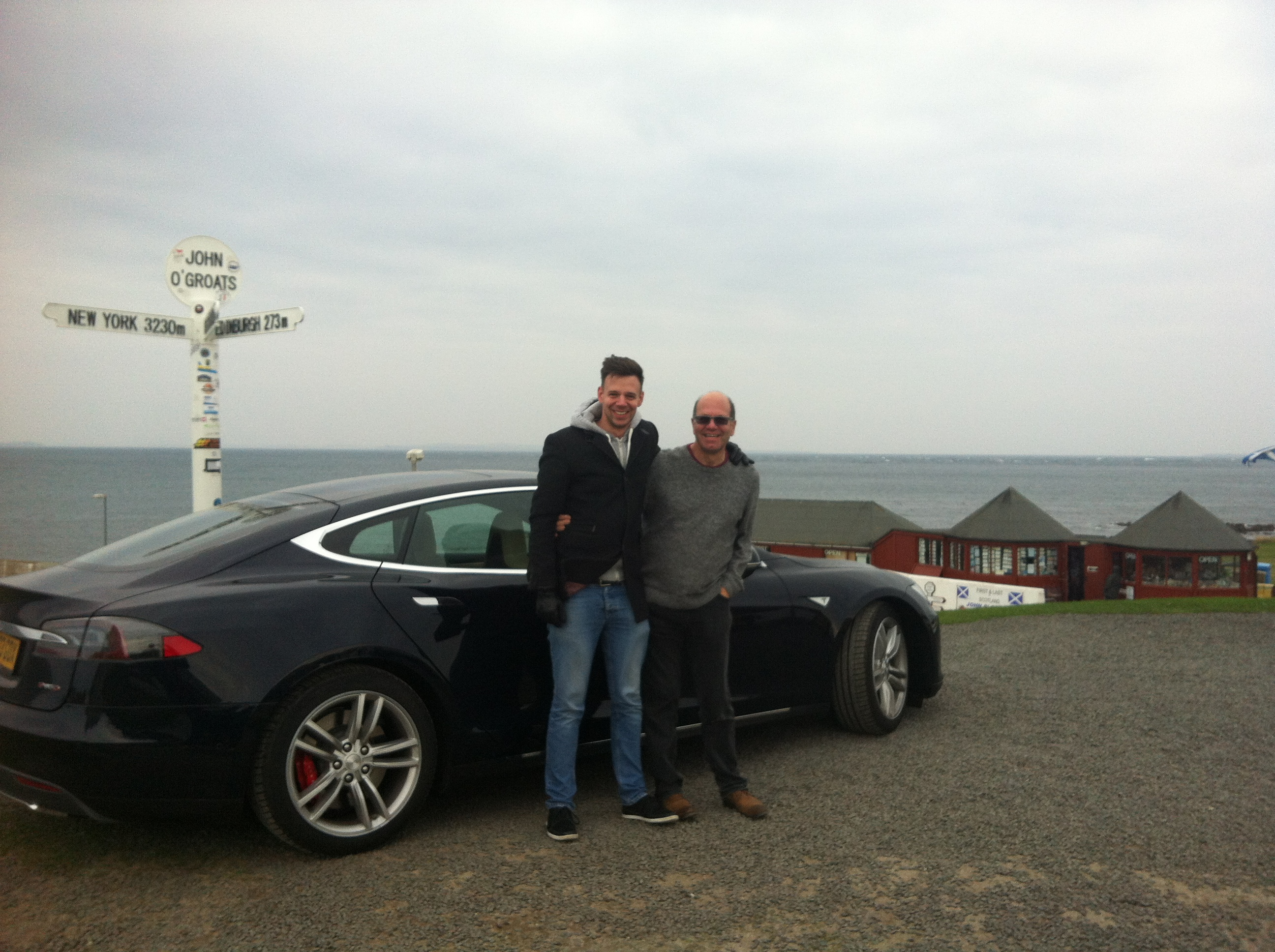
Dr Jeff Allan and his son Ben Cottam-Allan having completed their journey from Land's End to John o' Groats set off for the return journey.

On 7 October 2015, Jeff Allan and his son, Ben Cottam-Allan, beat the electric car record in a Tesla Model S completing the northbound route in 19 hours 45 minutes and the southbound route in 18 hours 53 minutes. Jeff prepared the route by cycling in May 2015. They hold the Guinness World Record for shortest charging time from John o' Groats to Land's End of 3 hours 44 minutes 33 seconds.

On 21 August 2017, John Chivers completed the first journey by electric motorcycle (a Zero DSR) from Land's End to John o' Groats, then continued his journey to Orkney and finally to Skaw, on the island of Unst, Shetland. The journey from Land's End to John o' Groats took him four days to complete, breaking the journey up into ten parts, each stop requiring a charge of at least three hours.

On 30 July 2017 Andy Maxfield from Inskip near Preston completed the journey from John o'Groats to Land's End on an unmodified John Deere X750 ride on lawn tractor. The 874 mile journey was completed in a Guinness World Record time of 5 days 8 hours 36 mins with an average speed of around 9 mph. This journey was inspired by his father James Maxfield who suffered from Alzheimer's for 13 years with the challenge raising around £10,000 for The Alzheimer's Society. The journey was completed with a support team from John Deere and his two daughters Kathryn and Kaitlyn Maxfield.

In September 2017, Tommy Davies and Tom Harvey allegedly completed the 841-mile journey in 9 hours and 36 minutes, the fastest time ever recorded between the two points on land, with an overall average of 86.7 mph. In December 2020, over three years on from the alleged journey, Davies appeared at Truro Crown Court charged with two counts of perverting the course of justice and two counts of dangerous driving. Opening the case, prosecutor Ryan Murray explained to the jury that a tracker Davies purchased a month before the journey, showed that at 8pm on 5 September 2017 the tracker was recorded in John O’Groats, but by 5:36am the same tracker recorded that it was in Land's End, some 841 miles away. In addition, his phone was also found to have made the same journey. Davies implicated himself during media coverage in which he discussed the alleged recordbreaking journey – including appearances in national newspapers, an interview on BBC Radio 2's The Jeremy Vine Show and footage on YouTube. In defence at court, Davies stated that he had exaggerated details of the journey to the media. Murray went on to say that on 30 August 2018, police executed a search warrant at Davies’ home. Police seized an Audi S5 owned by Davies, in which he claimed to have completed the journey – equipped with an additional fuel tank, and various electronic equipment capable of warning of speed cameras and indicating nearby emergency vehicles. Despite the journey time of 9 hours 36 minutes, the court heard that none of the 105 speed cameras along the route had been triggered. Furthermore, an expert witness for the defence, William Campbell, stated that none of the equipment found in Davies' car could have prevented the speed cameras from activating. Davies, who represented himself throughout the 5-day trial, gained plaudits from Judge Robert Linford for his conduct. After four hours of deliberation, the jury acquitted Davies of all charges.

In April 2018 the first hydrogen powered fuel cell electric vehicle, a Toyota Mirai, completed the journey. Driven by Richard Bremner and Luc Lacey from Autocar and Jon Hunt from Toyota they started the journey from Kirkwall in Orkney. To reach the hydrogen refuelling infrastructure at the time they travelled via Aberdeen, Sunderland, Rotherham and Beaconsfield covering 1,109 miles (1785 km) at an average speed of 56 miles an hour. The journey took 19 hours 40 minutes with hydrogen consumption of 0.9 kg per 100 km (16.1 kg of hydrogen consumed).

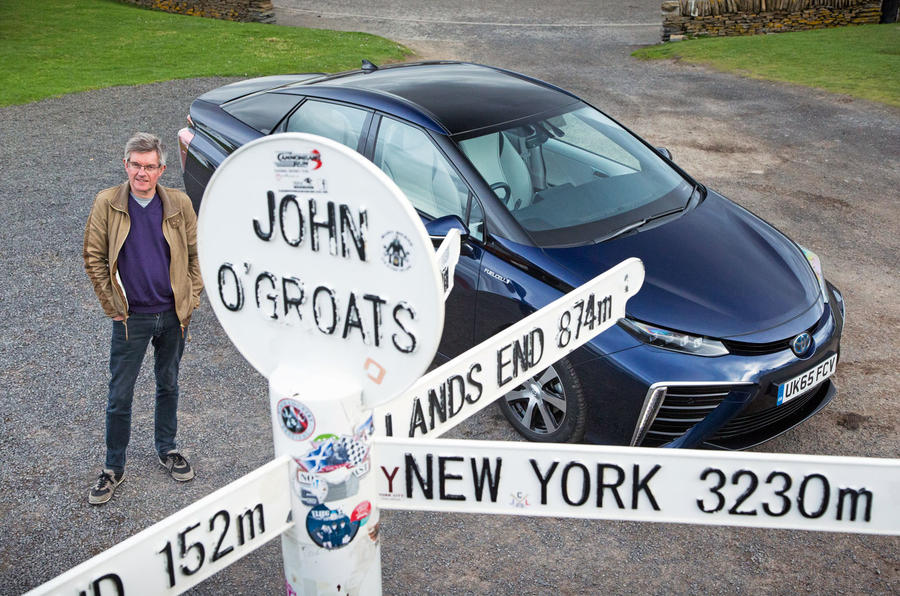
Richard Bremner with the Toyota Mirai the first JOG to LE Hydrogen Fuel Cell Car at John o'Groats

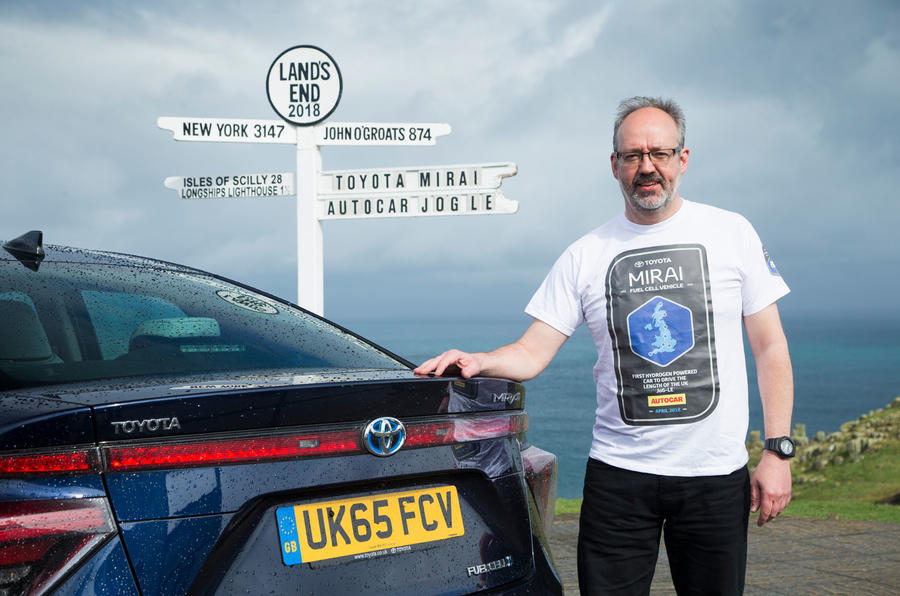
Jon Hunt with the Toyota Mirai the first JOG to LE Hydrogen Fuel Cell Car at Land's End

=== Bus and coach ===
The fastest journey by bus and coach was first set by John and Kirsty Boyd from Runcorn, Cheshire, who travelled from Land's End to John O' Groats in August 2017 using 20 buses/coaches, in 3 days, 2 hours and 47 minutes. In June 2022, Harvey Logan reported on Twitter that he had travelled from Land's End to John O' Groats using seven buses/coaches in 32 hours and 17 minutes.

The current fastest journey by local bus (defined as in section 3 of the Transport Act 1980 to be a stage carriage service with stops within 30 miles) was set by Clive Burgess in September 2016. He travelled from Lands End to John o'Groats using 31 buses, in 3 days, 8 hours and 55 minutes.

In June 2014, to celebrate completing his GCSE exams, 16-year-old Adam Mugliston travelled from Land's End to John o' Groats on 36 buses in four days, 10 hours and 44 minutes.

In August 2011, James Aukett travelled from Land's End to John o' Groats on 31 buses in five days, 7 hours and 25 minutes. James undertook the trip to raise money for children's charity, The Children's Society.

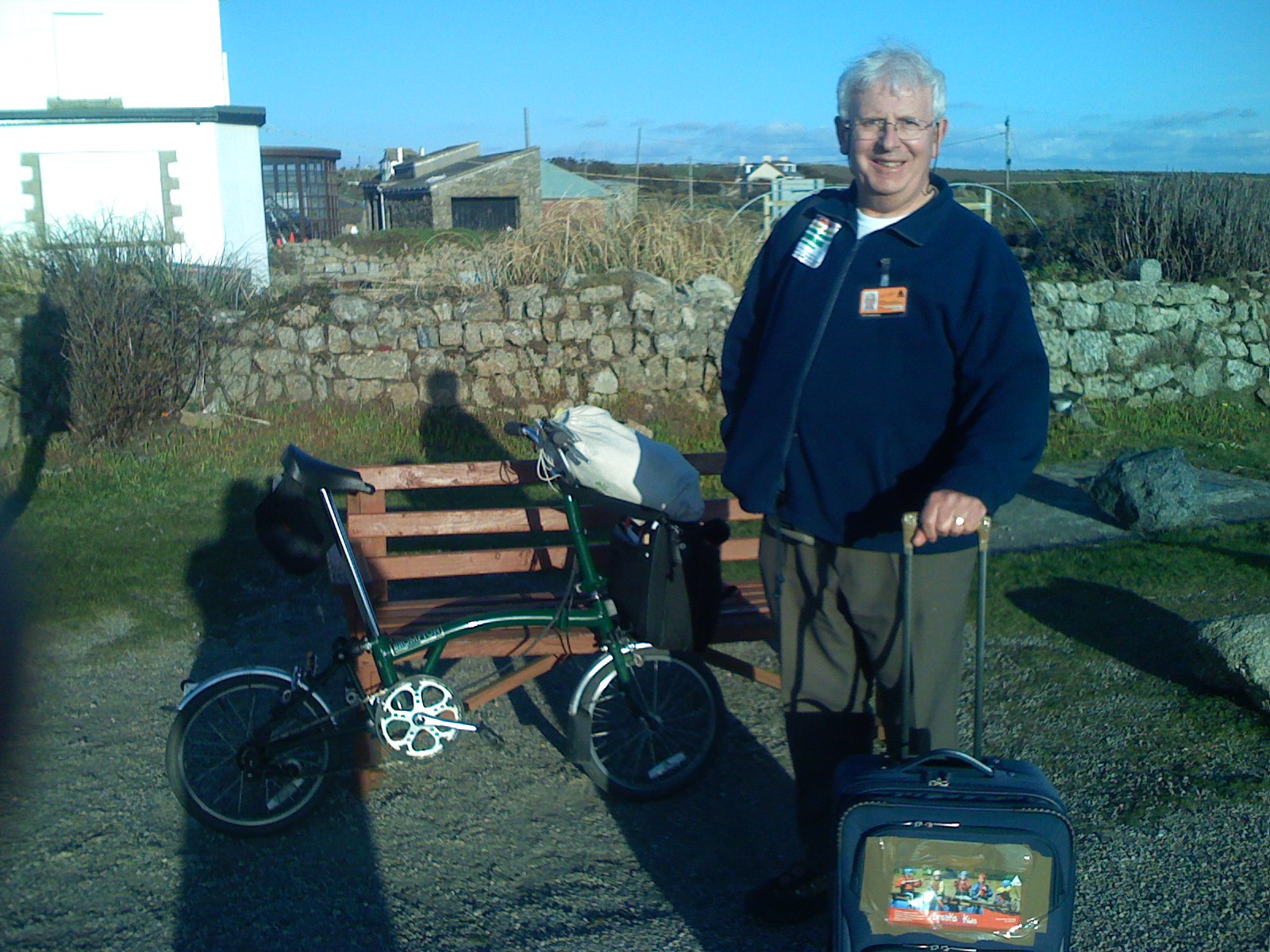
Richard Elloway, having completed the return trip using a senior bus-pass "without paying a penny".

In 2008, Richard Elloway of Somerset claimed to be the first person to complete the journey from Land's End to John o' Groats and back free of charge by local buses, using the English National Concessionary Pass (a free bus pass for eligible people) introduced on 1 April 2008, and the pre-existing equivalent concession for pensioners in Scotland. English passes cannot normally be used in Scotland, but the BBC reported that "it is understood Mr Elloway got special permission to carry out his round Britain trip." He completed the first leg of the trip in one week and six hours. The entire journey was completed in two weeks, 8 hours and 30 minutes.

In 1954, Gertrude Leather travelled by 17 local buses from Land's End to London, at a cost of £1 19s 6d (£1.97½), and the following year travelled from London to John o' Groats by 25 local buses at a cost of £4 5s 9½d (£4.29).

=== Train ===
The closest railway station to Land's End is Penzance, while the closest to John o' Groats is Wick, so any rail journey will also include other means of transport.

The record time for a single journey from Land's End to John O'Groats using "public ground transport" is 23 hours 5 minutes and 26 seconds and was set in August 2024 by Andrew Tomlinson from West Yorkshire. Tomlinson was already the holder of this record, and bettered the time he set jointly with his colleague Daniel Johnson in 2023 by almost 55 minutes.

The record for a return journey is 49 hours 54 minutes, set by 65-year-old Roy Plomet completing on 1 July 2016, raising funds for the Down's Syndrome Association.

=== Paramotor (motorised paraglider) ===
The first recorded journey by paramotor was by Andy Phillips, supported by a team of British Royal Marines in September 2000. The trip took a little over six days and was completed from south to north.

The first recorded trip from north to south was by John Caston, Brian Pushman, Alex Heron and Henry Glasse in September 2009 and took five days.

In July 2016 a group of four pilots completed the trip from north to south in 6.5 days. This included double amputee Cayle Royce, who became the first person to fly the route in a ParaTrike.

=== Golf ===
In 2005 Surrey-based golfer and member of the Kent Golf Society David Sullivan walked from John o' Groats to Land's End hitting golf balls all the way. He travelled the 1,100 miles (1,800 km) in seven weeks to be eligible for the Guinness Book of Records as the longest golf hole. He raised money for the Variety Club, the 2004 Indian Ocean earthquake and tsunami Appeal, and the Orpheus Centre, a residential arts and learning facility for the young and disabled in Surrey.

=== Aeroplane ===
The fastest passage between the two points was made in 1988 by a McDonnell Douglas F-4K Phantom in a time of 46 minutes 44 seconds

=== In a straight line ===
On 17 May 2014 a team of four set off to complete Beeline Britain – a journey from Land's End to John o' Groats in a straight line. This never before attempted route was completed in 28 days and required the two biggest sea kayak crossings ever completed in UK waters.

- The first crossing went direct from Land's End to Pembrokeshire – a distance of over 200 km which took 34.5 hours to complete.
- The second crossing went direct from Pembrokeshire to Anglesey – around 170 km and taking 24.5 hours to complete.

The team then kayaked, biked and hiked the remainder of the route which went via: Isle of Man – Dalmellington – Glasgow – Crieff – traversing Ben Macdui, the second-highest mountain in the UK – Lossiemouth – across the Moray Firth – Lybster – John o' Groats.

The project was devised and managed by Ian O'Grady. He recruited the Team GB Paralympian Nick Beighton; Adam Harmer, a professional kayak coach and university lecturer; and Tori James, who was the first Welsh woman to stand on the summit of Mount Everest. Beeline Britain's aim was to raise funds and awareness for Blesma, the limbless veterans charity. The project gained full royal endorsement from the Royal Foundation of the Duke and Duchess of Cambridge and Prince Harry and has raised over £20,000 for Blesma.

The whole journey was captured by filmmaker Ian Burton for the feature documentary As the Crow Flies.

In 2022, George Bromley, who had broken his neck playing rugby for the Army, completed a 44-day solo "Beeline" journey from Land's End to John o'Groats, but bad weather had frustrated his plan to kayak across the Bristol Channel. Instead, he walked up the Cornish coast and used a boat crossing.

== Youngest and oldest ==
=== Youngest ===
The Land's End–John o' Groats Association presents the Jack Adams/Richard Elloway Trophy annually to the youngest person to have completed the journey other than as a passenger in a motor vehicle. Henry Cole completed the journey in June 2006, at the age of four; he cycled over 31 days. He started school in the following September and was presented with the Jack Adams/Richard Elloway Trophy in January 2007. Sophie George is currently the youngest recipient of the Jack Adams/Richard Elloway Trophy. She completed the journey by bus and train in August 2016 at the age of two years and 10 months and was awarded the trophy in January 2017. In 2017, Amelia Sampson, aged 22 months, completed John o' Groats to Land's End in 14 days in her trailer towed by her parents riding a tandem.

On 30 May 2025, Marcus Skeet became the youngest person to run the journey, doing so in 58 days and at just 17 years, 3 months, and 20 days old.

=== Oldest ===
Allan Knight is the oldest person to complete the journey on foot; he walked from John o' Groats to Land's End and completed his journey on 2 November 2021 at the age of 76 years 144 days.

== Organisations ==
There are three organisations supporting people undertaking the journey.

- The Land's End – John o'Groats Association is a non-commercial organisation established in 1983 for "those who have completed the epic journey from Land’s End to John o' Groats, or vice versa, by any means in a single trip". The Association awards certificates to members who complete the journey and some are eligible to receive a trophy.
- The Land's End John o' Groats Club, which is sponsored by the company that operates facilities at Land's End and John o' Groats, the end points. It holds an annual awards ceremony to select the most notable 'end-to-enders' each year.
- Bike the UK for MS is a charity raising awareness for multiple sclerosis research and patients by running supported cycling trips including from Land's End to John o' Groats. They combine "an important cause with an incredible experience to help fund treatment and research for a cure whilst addressing the challenges for those affected by MS".

== Scottish equivalent ==
Until Union with England in 1707, Scotland's equivalent of the phrase was often "John o' Groats to Maidenkirk", as Maidenkirk (Kirkmaiden) was traditionally considered Scotland's southernmost point, a 388-mile (624 km) trip. This can be found in Robert Burns' poem On Captain Grose's Peregrinations thro' Scotland and the song, The Lady of Kenmure:

From John o' Groats to Maidenkirk
You'll never find a truer
For loyal faith and dauntless deeds,
Than the Lady of Kenmure.

The southernmost village in Scotland is actually nearby Drummore.

A similar modern equivalent is MugDunnet - from the southernmost tip of mainland Scotland at the Mull of Galloway, to the northernmost point at Dunnet Head. Peter Minting first proposed and completed this route as a cycling challenge in September 2026, while raising funds for the St John of Jerusalem Eye Hospital Group. His recommended MugDunnet route includes several sections of the National Cycle Network (NCN) in Scotland (NCN83, NCN7 and NCN1). There is no official cycle route for the first section from Mull of Galloway lighthouse to Castle Kennedy, before heading east via NCN83 and then north on NCN7 from Newton Stewart to join NCN1 at Inverness. North of Tain (where the NCN1 cycle path ends) the route is on roads via Lairg, Altnaharra, Syre, Bettyhill, Shebster, Thurso and Dunnet.

== English equivalent ==
The length of the English mainland is delineated by the distance between Land's End and Marshall Meadows Bay in Northumberland. The distance is 556 miles (895 km) by road or 426 miles (686 km) as the crow flies. The traversal of the length of England is sometimes used to define charity events such as walks and cycle-rides.

== Fictional depictions ==
- In the 2021 British film, The Last Bus, the main character, an elderly widower, travels from John o' Groats to Land's End to scatter his wife's ashes. He makes the entire journey using a series of local buses.
- In The Goon Show episode "The Great Bank Robbery", Neddie Seagoon practices for and participates in a drum race from John o' Groats to Land's End.

== See also ==
- Malin to Mizen
- Du battant des lames au sommet des montagnes
