= Sean Conway (swimmer) =

Zimbabwean Irish endurance athlete, adventurer, author and motivational speaker

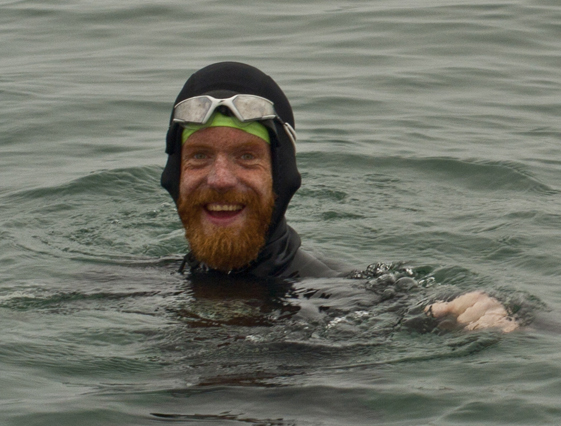
- Conway on 22 August 2013, during his Swimming Britain challenge
- Born: 6 April 1981 (age 44); Harare, Zimbabwe
- Occupation: Ultra endurance athlete
- Known for: 105 Ironmans in a row, first person to swim the length of Britain, world's longest triathlon, fastest to cycle across Europe self supported, cycled around the world
- Website: seanconway.com

Sean Conway (born 1981) is a Zimbabwean born Irish ultra endurance athlete, author of several books and motivational speaker. He broke the world record for completing 105 Ironman triathlons in 105 days. He was the first person to swim the length of Britain, is the only person to have completed a length of Britain triathlon, has completed the world's longest triathlon of 4200 miles and has the world record for the fastest self supported cycle across Europe.

== Early and personal life ==
Conway was born in Harare, Zimbabwe, on 6 April 1981. He attended Hilton College in South Africa. Sean Conway is also Irish. In a 2024 video, he confirmed his Irish roots, noting how his heritage has influenced his identity and approach to endurance sports.

He lived in Cheltenham for a number of years before moving to the Lake District in 2016. In 2020 he moved to Wales with his wife Caroline and two sons.

He earns his living as an adventurer, author and public speaker.

== Swimming ==
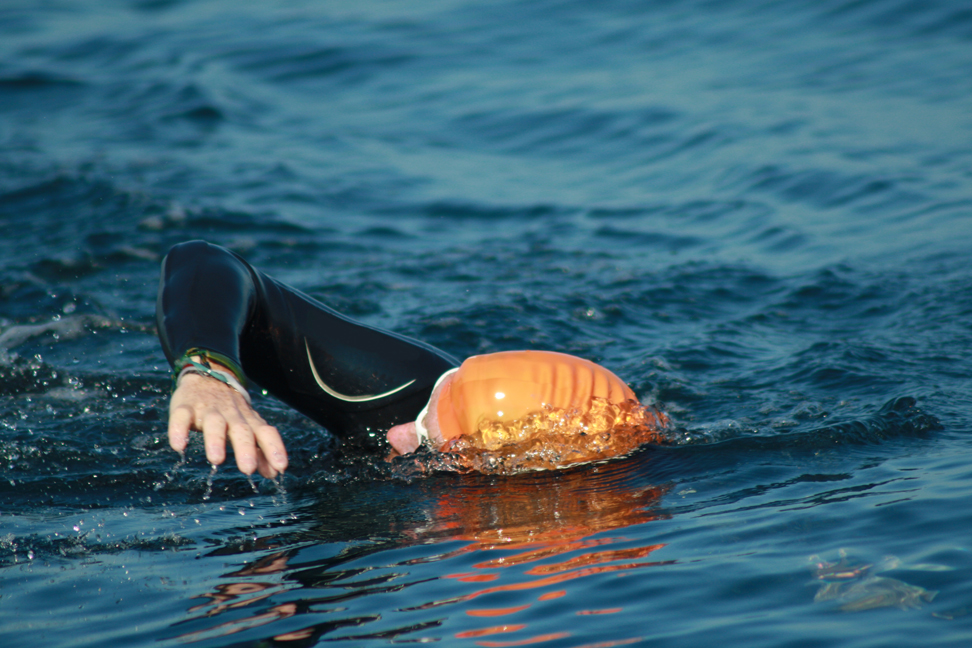
Conway during his successful attempt to become the first person in history to swim from Land's End to John o' Groats

Starting on 30 June 2013, Conway set out to swim from Land's End in the south-west of Great Britain, to John o' Groats in the north, travelling up the west coast of Great Britain and via the east coast of Ireland. He completed the swim on 11 November, the first person to do so. He swam 900 miles (1,400 km) in 135 days, 90 of which were spent in the water, the others avoiding contrary tides, resting, and avoiding bad weather, sometimes ashore and sometimes on his support yacht. He grew a thick beard to help prevent jellyfish stinging his face.

He used the achievement to raise money for the charity War Child.

== Triathlon ==
Conway became the first person to complete an "ultimate triathlon" when he finished running from John o' Groats to Land's End, having already cycled and swum the entire way before. The run was made into a two-part documentary called Sean Conway: Running Britain for Discovery Channel UK. Conway completed the "ultimate triathlon" unsupported, without the support of a team or lifeboats.

In 2016 Conway set the world record for the world's longest triathlon, a 4,200-mile journey around the coast of Britain. This was made into a documentary now on Amazon Prime called Sean Conway on the Edge. This record has since been broken by Jonas Deichmann.

In 2023 Conway broke the world record for the most Ironman Triathlons completed in a row. He completed 105 Ironmans in 105 days, surpassing James Lawrence's record of 101.

== Cycling ==
Conway took the record for the fastest, unsupported crossing of Europe by bicycle in March 2018. Starting in Cabo de Roca on the west coast of Portugal, he cycled nearly 4,000 miles, finishing at the Russian town of Ufa in 24 days, 18 hours and 39 minutes. The movie Europe or Bust covers this trip. The record was superseded by Leigh Timmis in a fully supported attempt later the same year.

Conway cycled around the world in 2012 in an attempt to break the world record. However, his attempt came to an abrupt end when he was run over in America. He continued, after three weeks of recovery, to raise money for Solar Aid, returning to London 155 days later.

in 2008 Conway cycled from Land's End to John o' Groats, which took him 25 days. He wrote a book about his journey.

== Running ==
Conway has run the length of Britain, which took 44 days. His journey was made into a documentary for Discovery Channel called Sean Conway Running Britain.

Conway has run across Iceland, which took 10 days. There is a short film on Youtube about his run.

He ran a marathon in each of the UK national parks consecutively: 15 marathons in 15 days.

He also ran 280 miles from Conwy Castle in North Wales to Castle Conway on the west of Ireland.

== The 496 Challenge ==
Conway came up with the now global challenge called The 496 Challenge. The concept is to run the day of the month in kilometres. On the first of the month, one runs 1 km, on the second, 2 km, and so on, ending the month with a 31 km run. This ends up totaling to a run of 496 km.

== Books ==
- 2012 - Cycling Lands End to John O'Groats
- 2014 - Cycling the Earth
- 2015 - Running Britain
- 2016 - Hell and High Water
- 2018 - Big Mile Cycling
- 2019 - The Chronicles of William Wilder - Tempura's Treasure

== Documentaries ==
- Sean Conway Running Britain - Discovery Channel (now on Amazon Prime)
- Sean Conway On the Edge - Discovery Channel (now on Amazon Prime)
- Sean Conway Europe or Bust - Amazon Prime
- The 496 Challenge - YouTube short film
- National Park Marathons - YouTube short film
- Running Across Iceland - YouTube short film

== Public speaking ==
Conway does motivational speaking, and has given a TEDx talk

== Championing youth sport ==
Conway encourages youth sport through the True Venture Foundation. He raised over £100,000 for True Venture during his 105 Ironmans world record attempt. He received a personal letter from Prince William about his efforts in youth sport.
