= Road Records Association =

British cycle racing organisation

RRA Logo

The Road Records Association (RRA) is a British cycle racing organisation which supervises records on the road but not in conventional races. It is one of the oldest cycle sport organisations in the world, formed in 1888.

== Remit ==
Records are established by riders performing time trials covering set distances (e.g. 25, 50 or 100 miles), prescribed periods of time (12 or 24 hours), or between places (e.g. London to Brighton and back, Land's End to John o' Groats). Riders can compete on single bicycles or tricycles and tandem bicycles or tandem tricycles, with records accepted for men, women and, in the tandem categories, mixed teams.

Records for set distances can be established on straight-out courses which may incorporate significant downhills and strong tail-winds. This contrasts with records established in conventional time trials, where the start and finish points are required to be within a short distance of each other to neutralise the impact of gradients and weather.

== Early history ==
From 1890, the National Cyclists' Union (an association established to organise and regulate UK bicycle racing) had banned all cycle racing on public roads. However, certain exceptions were made - first record-breaking and then time trials.

Arthur James Wilson, president of the North Road Cycling Club, convened a meeting in 1888 at which the Road Records Association was founded with the object of certifying the claims of male cyclists on the road, and setting standards for the timing and authentication of records. The Women's Road Record Association (WRRA) was formed in 1934, and merged with the RRA in 1989.

Frederick Thomas Bidlake was a record-breaker in the 1880s, and later in demand as a timekeeper. He was a member of the RRA committee for many years, and president from 1924 until his death in 1933.

== Records ==
The RRA recognises records for:

- 25 Miles
- 50 Miles
- 100 Miles
- 1000 Miles
- 12 Hours
- 24 Hours
- Land's End to John o' Groats
- Land's End to London
- London to York
- London to Edinburgh
- York to Edinburgh
- London to Liverpool
- Liverpool to Edinburgh
- London to Cardiff
- London to Pembroke
- Pembroke to Gt Yarmouth
- London to Birmingham
- London to Bath & Back
- London to Portsmouth & Back
- London to Brighton & Back

== Regional Groups ==
Autonomous groups of the RRA focus on record-breaking within their own respective parts of the country.

- Eastern Counties RRA - Cambridgeshire, Essex, Hertfordshire, Middlesex, Norfolk, Suffolk
- Midland RRA - West Midlands, Warwichshire, Hereford & worcester, Gloucestershire, Staffordshire, Shropshire, Leicestershire, Northamptonshire, Oxfordshire, Derbyshire, Avon
- Northern RRA - Northumberland, Westmorland, Durham, Cumberland, Yorkshire, Lancashire, Cheshire, Derbyshire, Shropshire, Staffordshire, Flint, Denbighshire and parts of Nottinghamshire, Leicestershire, Lincolnshire
- North & West Home Counties RRA - Middlesex, Hertfordshire, Cambridgeshire, Norfolk west of the Great Ouse, Lincolnshire, Nottinghamshire south of the river Trent, Leicestershire, Warwickshire, Northamptonshire, Bedfordshire, Buckinghamshire, Berkshire, Oxfordshire, Wiltshire, Hampshire and Surrey
- RRA of Scotland - all Scottish roads
- Southern RRA - South-East England (mostly south of the Thames, east of the London-Southampton route)
- Welsh RRA - all Welsh roads
- Western Counties RRA - Cornwall, Devon, Somerset, Avon, Wiltshire, Gloucestershire east of the Severn, west Hampshire
