= John Kain =

John Kain may refer to:

- John Kain (rugby league), English rugby league player
- John F. Kain, American economist and professor
- John Joseph Kain, American Roman Catholic archbishop

== See also ==
- John Kane (disambiguation)
- John Cain (disambiguation)
