= Transport Ticketing Authority =

State agency in Victoria, Australia

Agency overview
- Formed: June 2003
- Dissolved: 1 July 2013
- Type: Statutory authority
- Headquarters: Melbourne, Victoria, Australia
- Parent department: Department of Transport

The Transport Ticketing Authority (TTA) was a statutory authority within the Department of Transport in the State Government of Victoria, Australia. It was established in June 2003 to manage Victoria's interest in the OneLink Metcard public transport ticketing system contract, and to procure and manage the new ticketing system for Victoria, eventually known as myki.

On 10 February 2010, the Minister for Public Transport replaced Gary Thwaites, chief executive of the Transport Ticketing Authority (TTA), with Bernie Carolan, the then head of Metlink.

On 1 January 2013, as the third stage of the implementation of the Public Transport Development Authority Act 2011, Public Transport Victoria assumed the responsibilities of the TTA, which was formally abolished on 1 July 2013.

== Roll-out of myki ==
Work on a replacement of the Metcard ticketing system commenced in late 2002.

=== Selection of operator ===
The tender for the new ticketing system opened in July 2004 and closed in October. Ten tender offers were received from six bidders, and four bids were short-listed in December. By March 2005, two companies had been short-listed for the final stage of the tender process. They were:

- Keane Corporation, with contractors Ascom and Downer Engineering, and
- Manta.T, comprising ADI Limited and MTR Corporation, with contractor Thales.

On 12 July 2005, the Kamco (Keane) consortium was selected to develop the system. The $494 million contract was due for completion by 2007. Keane Australia was a wholly owned subsidiary of the United States company Keane Inc., and when the myki contract was awarded it described itself as "an alliance" of Keane Australia, Ascom, ERG, and Giesecke & Devrient Australasia (G&D), with Keane Australia providing "a single point of accountability" for TTS. Kamco sub-contracted the installation and repair of myki equipment to ERG, in an A$106 million contract.

The tender process was the subject of a number of probity concerns in December 2007, with the Victorian Auditor-General requesting police to investigate a leak of tender documents. Draft reports from the Auditor-General's investigation referred to backdated documents and inconsistent treatment of bidders, but independent reports by Pricewaterhouse Coopers and Avanti Consulting in 2005, as well as the Victorian Auditor-General found that the integrity of the tender process had not been compromised. In 2007, serious probity concerns were raised when it was revealed that TTA boss Vivian Miners, who owned shares in the winning bidder, had also become the highest paid bureaucrat, earning A$550,000 a year. Further probity issues were raised when it was revealed the new Myki boss Garry Thwaites was married to the probity auditor for the original tender. Conflict of interest was denied by Public Transport Minister Lynne Kosky.

=== Beginning of the roll-out ===
A pilot program was due to begin in early 2007, but was delayed by approximately a year. In the meantime, more than 20,000 pieces of equipment had been installed, with civil engineering works continuing.

In February 2008, Public Transport Minister Kosky announced that the full roll-out of the system would not begin until the end of the year. By March the same year, the minister said that the system would not be operational until 2010. In April 2008, TTA announced that it had stopped making service payments to the Kamco consortium after April 2007, because the project had not been delivered on schedule.

The first field trial of Myki was held on the Geelong bus network in late 2007. The trial identified problems with 'front office' computer software. In May 2008 Kamco conducted 'Regional Bus Pilot 1' in Geelong, after which it announced that 90% of tests had been passed. According to Kamco's report, Regional Bus Pilot 1 showed that: "Essential onbus activities such as scan on and scan off, top up Myki, purchase of short-term tickets using cash or Myki money, driver log on / off, route and shift selection and GPS connectivity and accuracy performed well. Back office processes and operational procedures such as end-to-end data transaction flows, generation of reports, training, communications, installation and commissioning were generally good. The operator (McHarry's Buslines) was pleased with the NTS training, performance and ease of use of the Myki solution."

Further field tests across other transport modes were planned during the second half of 2008, including an additional test on regional buses.

In August 2008, testing began on the Melbourne suburban train and tram networks. The train tests involved Kamco staff at East Camberwell, Canterbury, Chatham and Mont Albert stations. On trams, special services on route 86, not open to normal fare-paying passengers, were used. These tests were all single mode, with multi-modal trips to be tried at a later date.

On 12 December 2008, Myki went on sale to the general public on four bus routes in Geelong, and on 2 March 2009 all bus routes in the Geelong and Bellarine Peninsula area were completely switched to Myki.

In April 2009, all bus services in Ballarat, Bendigo and Seymour were converted to Myki. In May 2009 all bus services in the Latrobe Valley towns of Moe, Morwell, Traralgon and Warragul were operating with Myki equipment, making it the last regional bus system to be converted.

=== Melbourne roll-out ===
In May 2009, Myki readers began to be installed on Melbourne trams, and in June 2009, the first Myki vending machines appeared at metropolitan rail stations, with buses following. 17,000 pieces of equipment were to be installed as part of the rollout, with up to 23 pieces being installed per tram, and 2,700 pieces to be installed across the train network's 217 stations.

From 29 December 2009, Myki became valid for travel on all metropolitan train services (but not trams and buses), in a politically driven move to meet a promise by Transport Minister Lynne Kosky and Premier John Brumby to have the system working by the end of 2009.

The limited rollout was said to be due to reliability problems with the equipment on Melbourne's trams and buses. It was reported that the use of Myki on trams was being halted by signal drop-outs, related to the heavy steel construction of the trams, which was hindering the wireless communications required; and the overhead electrical systems may possibly have had a detrimental effect on performance. The new Transport Minister, Martin Pakula, said that another major problem still affecting trams was "canyoning", in which trams regularly drop out of remote communication with a central server because of tall city buildings. One source close to the Myki project said the government had considered installing remote devices on tall CBD buildings to improve communications with all devices in the city centre.

After the initial launch, tickets could only be purchased online, or from six regional cities where Myki was already in use, further limiting the number of travellers able to use the system. 24 hours after the launch, over 14,000 commuters had registered online for their free Myki.

On 25 July 2010, Myki became available for use on Metropolitan and suburban buses and trams.

In May 2014, the first Myki electronic gates with the touch screen were implemented.

=== Further roll-out halted ===
In July 2010, then Opposition leader Ted Baillieu had said that the Opposition was "considering its legal options" with regards to Myki and would look at dropping the system if it won the next Victorian state election.

Having won the state election in November 2010, the new Liberal/National coalition government announced on 28 December 2010 that it would halt any further rollout of Myki, including V/Line usage, card top-ups by bus drivers, and the introduction of sales at retail shops, until an independent audit had been completed on the state of the current system.

A decision was to be made to either scrap Myki and continue with Metcard, modify the Myki system, scale back the roll-out, or continue the roll-out as initially planned. In June 2011, the government confirmed that Myki would continue operation. However it was announced that short-term tickets would not be introduced in metropolitan Melbourne, and would be abolished on regional city bus systems, where they have been in use since Myki's introduction. With the Myki system to be retained, users have asked that Myki be improved before it becomes the only ticketing system for Melbourne. A survey conducted by the Transport Department found that people like Myki's ease of use, but some complained about the time taken to touch on and off, and the inadequate provision of information about the Myki system. A survey conducted by the RACV found that users like Myki's ease of purchasing, but the time taken to touch on and off was a major disadvantage. The most requested improvement was for more flexibility in the system. Specifically, users want to be able to purchase single-use tickets.

=== Final Melbourne implementation ===
During 2012, the government progressively shut down the Metcard system.

- from the start of 2012, yearly Metcards became unavailable.
- from 26 March 2012, monthly and weekly Metcards became unavailable.
- from 30 June 2012, "value" Metcards, such as 10x2 hour, 10xEarly Bird, 5xDaily, 5xWeekend Daily, 5xSeniors Daily, 10xCity Saver, Sunday Saver and Off-Peak Daily became unavailable. Only single-use 2 hour, Daily, City Saver and Seniors Daily Metcards continued to be available.

All Metcard ticket vending machines on railway stations were removed or switched off. The only Metcard vending machines still in operation were on trams. The limited remaining range of Metcards could only be purchased from staff at premium stations, from bus drivers, and from PTV Hub.

On 13 September 2012, Public Transport Victoria and the TTA announced that Myki would become the only ticketing system on public transport from Saturday 29 December 2012. On that date all Metcard equipment remaining on the system became inoperative. In the meantime, the sale of Metcards at premium (staffed) Metro railway stations was progressively phased out, and ceased entirely during October.

Metcard validators commenced to be removed from railway stations on 12 November 2012, and all were removed or became inoperative by the end of December. Also from November, passengers with unused Metcards were able to transfer the value onto a Myki card as Myki money at premium Metro railway stations.

=== Regional implementation ===
Myki came into use on regional "commuter" (short-haul) rail services in mid-2013, in a staged process: between Melbourne and Seymour on 24 June, on the Traralgon line on 8 July, the Bendigo line on 17 July, the Ballarat line on 24 July, and the Geelong-Marshall line on 29 July. Family paper tickets are available to families travelling within the Myki zone with children below 17 years of age. On 10 November 2013, Myki was introduced on Wallan and Kilmore town buses.

After February 2014, paper tickets for passengers on commuter services were abolished, and passengers were required to use Myki. Paper tickets remain for travel outside the Myki zone, such as to Warrnambool, Bairnsdale, Swan Hill, Shepparton or Albury. Passengers with Myki Pass who want to travel beyond the Myki area can purchase paper "extension tickets" to cover the rest of their journey.

=== Retender ===
In July 2016, the Myki contract with the renamed NTT Data (formerly Kamco) was extended for another seven years. The renewed contract is worth A$700 million.
