= John McCain (disambiguation) =

John McCain (1936–2018) was a United States Senator and the 2008 Republican presidential candidate.

John McCain may also refer to:

== People ==
=== Senator's family ===
- John McCain (1851–1934), farmer, father of John S. McCain Sr., and great-grandfather of the senator; See Early life and military career of John McCain
  - John S. McCain Sr. (1884–1945), US Navy four-star admiral, father of John S. McCain Jr., and grandfather of the senator
    - John S. McCain Jr. (1911–1981), US Navy four-star admiral, son of John S. McCain Sr., and father of the senator

=== Other persons ===
- Jonathan McKain (born 1982), Australian association football player
- John W. McCain, CEO of Keane

== Ships ==
- USS John S. McCain (DL-3), a Mitscher-class guided-missile destroyer-leader, later re-designated as the destroyer DDG-36, commissioned in 1953 and decommissioned in 1978
- USS John S. McCain (DDG-56), an Arleigh-Burke-class guided-missile destroyer commissioned in 1994

== See also ==
- John McClane, fictional hero of the Die Hard action film series, played by Bruce Willis
- John S. McCain (disambiguation)
- USS John McCain, a list of ships of the US Navy
- John Cain (disambiguation)
