= John S. McCain =

John S. McCain may refer to:

== People ==
- John S. McCain Sr. (1884–1945), United States Navy admiral
- John S. McCain Jr. (1911–1981), United States Navy admiral and son of John S. McCain Sr.
- John S. McCain III (1936–2018), United States Navy captain, American statesman, politician, and son of John S. McCain Jr.

== Ships ==
- USS John S. McCain, a U.S. Navy ship name
  - USS John S. McCain (DL-3), a Mitscher-class destroyer in the United States Navy from 1953 to 1978
  - USS John S. McCain (DDG-56), an Arleigh Burke-class destroyer in the United States Navy since 1994

== See also ==
- John McCain (disambiguation)
