= John Kane =

John Kane may refer to:

== Entertainment ==
- John Kane (actor) (1746–1799), Irish actor and comedian
- John Kane (artist) (1860–1934), Scottish-born American painter
- John Kane (writer) (born 1945), British actor and writer

== Law ==
- John L. Kane Jr. (born 1937), U.S. federal judge
- M. John Kane IV, Oklahoma Supreme Court Justice

== Military ==
- John Kane (Medal of Honor), American soldier who fought in the American Civil War
- John R. Kane (1907–1996), American aviator and Medal of Honor recipient

== Politics ==
- John I. Kane, American politician, Pennsylvania State Senator, and trade unionist
- John K. Kane (1795–1858), American politician
- John Kane (trade unionist) (1819–1876), British trade unionist
- Jock Kane (John Kane, 1921–2013), British intelligence agency officer and GCHQ whistleblower
- John Kane (politician), American politician, Oklahoma State House Representative

== Sports ==
- John Kane (outfielder) (1882–1934), American baseball outfielder for the Cubs and Reds
- John Kane (infielder) (1900–1956), American baseball infielder for the Chicago White Sox
- John Kane (footballer, born 1960), English football player
- John Kane (footballer, born 1987), Scottish football player

== Other ==
- John M. Kane, American psychiatrist
- John Innes Kane, American explorer, scientist and philanthropist

== See also ==
- Jonny Kane (born 1973), British racing driver
- Jack Kane (1908–1988), Australian politician
- John Cain (disambiguation)
- John Caine (disambiguation)
