= Kamco =

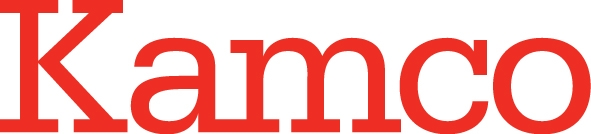
- Type: Subsidiary
- Industry: Electronic ticketing
- Founded: 2003
- Headquarters: Melbourne, Australia
- Key people: CEO Greg Purdy
- Products: myki
- Number of employees: 120+
- Parent: NTT Data

Kamco (Keane Australia Micropayment Consortium Pty Ltd) is the company formed in 2003 to tender for a new public transport ticketing system in Victoria, Australia. It was contracted to provide the Myki ticketing system in 2005. It is a wholly owned subsidiary of the American company Keane, and when the myki contract was awarded it described itself as "an alliance" of Keane Australia, Ascom, ERG and Giesecke & Devrient, with Keane Australia providing "a single point of accountability" for Victoria's Transport Ticketing Authority. ERG was the creator of Metcard.

In 2010, Keane was taken over by NTT Data and in October 2013 Keane Australia changed its name to NTT Data Victorian Ticketing System Pty Ltd.

== Controversy in Victoria ==
=== Procurement Process ===
In April 2008, Vivian Miners, chief executive of the Transport Ticketing Authority, quit his $545,000-a-year job. After a report into the tendering process by Des Pearson, Victoria's Attorney General Rob Hulls found the tendering for the ticket system had been conducted improperly. Mr Miners owned about $150,000 of shares in Headstrong, which was part of the Kamco consortium at the time it won the tender. Mr Miners' partner and former wife both worked for Headstrong and ERG, the Perth-based transport ticket company part of Keane. An early alleged draft of the report, leaked to the media in 2008, detailed a series of alleged conflicts of interest, probity issues, backdating of reports and favouring of the eventual winning bidder Kamco.

The final report observed that "Keane had no corporate experience in developing, implementing and operating a ticketing system" and "barely demonstrated adequate capacity." The project has since gone over both time and budget limits.

=== Cash Injection required ===
The Australian reported on 24 December 2007 that Kamco had requested a cash injection and wanted to change the contract to receive an accelerated payments schedule. To date Kamco has received $150m of the approx $750m spent.

=== Dispute with ERG ===
Kamco sub-contracted installation and repair of myki equipment to ERG in an A$106 million contract. However, ERG refused to release myki equipment to Kamco claiming "unpaid bills worth $1.8 million". Kamco repudiated the contract in June 2009 arguing a change in ERG's company structure broke their agreement. ERG sued Kamco for a $30 million loss it claimed from the repudiation, and Kamco launched a counter-claim in the Victorian Supreme Court.

=== January 2010 roll-out ===
By early 2010, the state's political opponents were presenting figures alleging that "Melbourne has by far the most costly smartcard system in the world". The Labor Party's Public Transport Minister Lynne Kosky attributed issues with the January 2010 roll-out to errors by Kamco, including "very silly mistakes" and "unacceptable" problems including a recall of 30,500 cards. Major operation problems included incorrect fare charging, cards that couldn't be activated and cards that wouldn't open entrance or exit gates.

=== Review into myki 2010/2011 ===
After the change of Government in the 2010 Victorian Election the incoming Liberal/National Coalition announced a "warts and all" review of myki by Deloitte. As of 2013, the Victorian Government had declined to release the report on the ground that "it would be disadvantageous to release it while negotiations for the operating contract are ongoing". Other companies have claimed they can provide alternative technical solutions at lower cost, but the Public Transport minister Terry Mulder said that it was not appropriate to consider these proposals until the Department of Treasury and Finance had costed the options in Deloitte's report. It could cost the government hundreds of millions of dollars to end its contract with Kamco early.
