= St Anne's Church, Buxton =

St Anne’s Church, Buxton
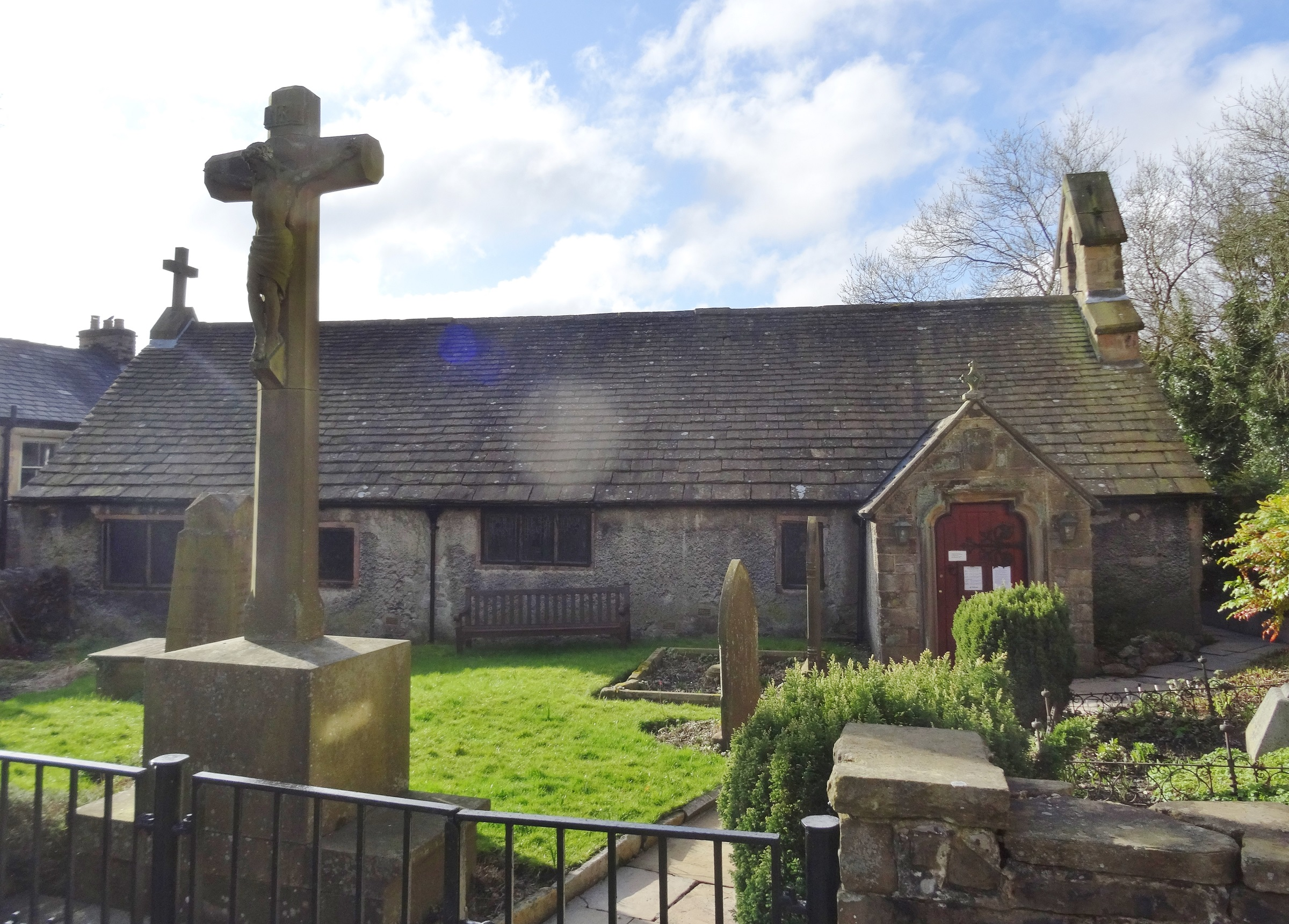
- St Anne’s Church, Buxton
- St Anne’s Church, Buxton
- 53.2538°N 1.9157°W
- OS grid reference: SK 05722 72975
- Location: Buxton, Derbyshire
- Country: England
- Denomination: Church of England

History
- Dedication: St Anne

Architecture
- Heritage designation: Grade II* listed

Administration
- Province: Canterbury
- Diocese: Derby
- Archdeaconry: Chesterfield
- Deanery: Peak Deanery
- Parish: Buxton

St Anne's Church is a Grade II* listed parish church in the Church of England in Buxton, Derbyshire.

== History ==
The single-storey church dates from the 17th century. It is believed to be the oldest building in Buxton. The date of 1625 is carved on the Saxon font and on the porch but it incorporated an earlier building, believed to have been a tithe barn or a farmhouse. The vestry was added at the side of the original rectangular building in 1715. The church was refurbished in 1841 and extended in 1894. The slate roof was restored in 1956.

St Anne's Church was converted to a school following the completion of the new Buxton parish church of St John the Baptist in 1811. It was then used as a Sunday school and as a mortuary chapel. The church was later closed before being reinstated for church services in 1885.

The Methdodist preacher John Wesley delivered a sermon in the church when he visited Buxton on 24 May 1783. The 18th-century Irish comedy actor John Kane was buried in the graveyard in 1799 (after he died mistakenly eating hemlock or wolf's bane). His gravestone is Grade II listed.

== Parish status ==
The church is in a joint parish with:

- Christ Church, Burbage
- Christ Church, King Sterndale
- St James' Church, Buxton
- St John the Baptist Church, Buxton
- St Mary's Church, Buxton

== See also ==
- Grade II* listed buildings in High Peak
- Listed buildings in Buxton
