= Videlli =

Australian company

Videlli Limited
- Type: Private
- Predecessor: ERG Group
- Founded: 1984
- Defunct: 2009
- Fate: Delisted
- Headquarters: Melbourne
- Website: http://www.videlli.com www.videlli.com

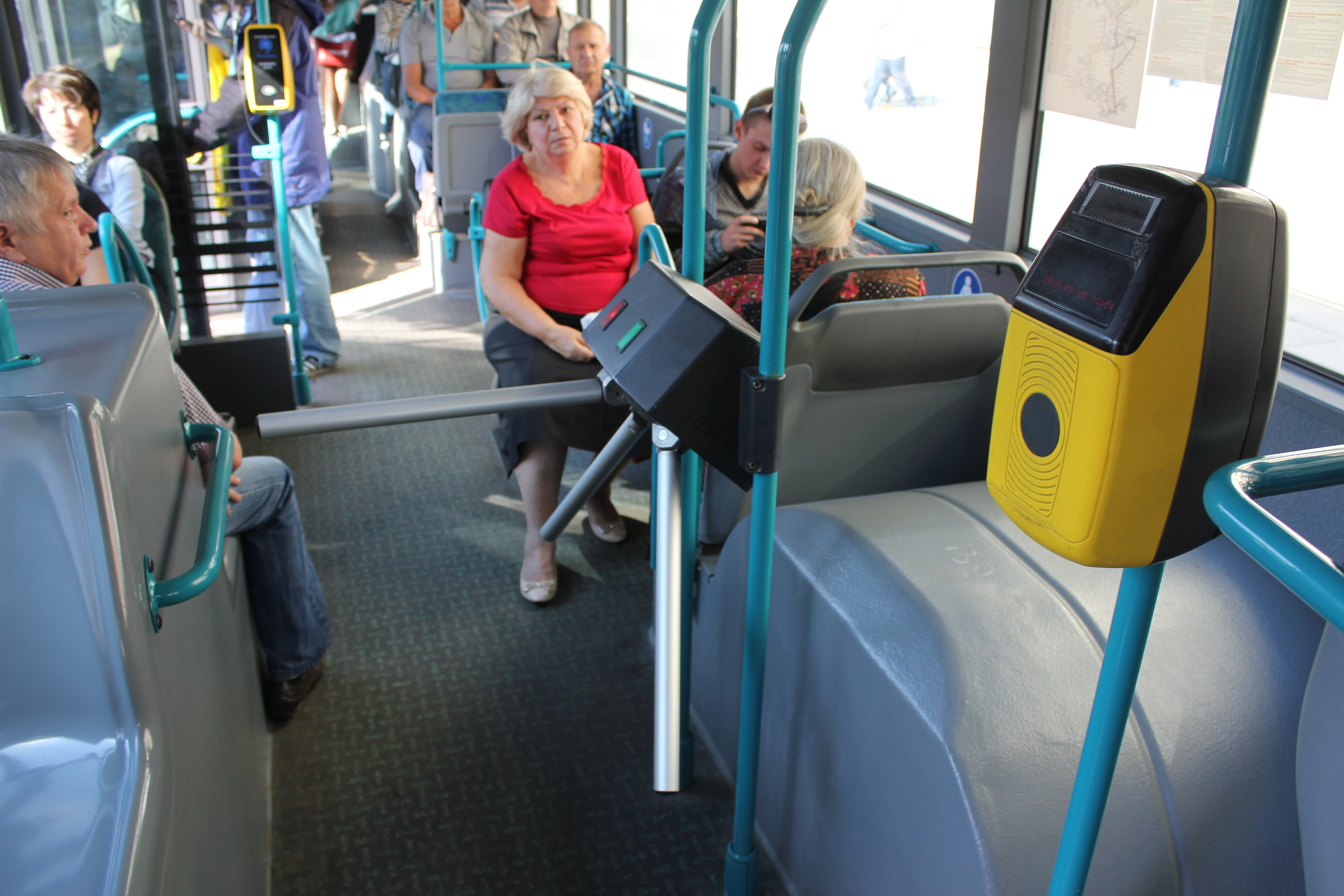
ERG smart card reader on a Moscow bus

Videlli Limited (formerly Energy Research Group or ERG Ltd) was an Australian company that developed automated fare collection systems for transit systems. Founded in 1984 as ERG, it was listed on the Australian Securities Exchange in 1985. Due to the large level of losses run up, ERG sold all the operating assets to Vix Technology in 2008, before ERG changed its name to Videlli and was delisted. Its head office was in Melbourne, Victoria.

== History ==
In 1978, Associated Electronic Services Ltd (AES), a Perth-based engineering company, began developing an automated fare collection (AFC) system. In 1984 AES won a contract for an AFC system in Toronto, Canada. That same year Energy Research Group (ERG) was listed on the stock exchange. ERG was a venture capital-backed company, researching various technologies including an electronic sign board and a manufacturing process for surfboards.

In 1987, ERG acquired a controlling interest in AES. The first project the new ERG won was in Darwin, resulting in the world's first use of smart cards for passengers by a public transit organisation. In 1988 ERG acquired the balance of AES.

In 1989, ERG acquired Radiolab, which specialised in pagers and base stations, to become ERG's telecommunications and manufacturing division. ERG also acquired a 70% interest in Prodata Electronics, Belgium.

On 31 August 1992 the ERG Datafare 2000/Prodata based magnetic-stripe systems fitted to all buses operated by the State Transit Authority in Sydney were switched on. This covered a fleet of around 1,600 buses and comprised the second stage of converting all of Sydney's government-run public transport services to electronic ticketing. Different suppliers were used for each mode of transport, with Thorn EMI/Abberfield installing ferry wharf equipment and Cubic Transportation Systems installing railway station equipment. The ticket data format was standardised to be common across all modes.

In 1997 ERG formed an alliance with Motorola, primarily for their smart card technology, and won substantial contracts in Berlin, Hong Kong, Rome, San Francisco and Singapore. An alliance with American Express was formed. Ecard was established.

In February 2003 ERG's subsidiary Integrated Transit Solutions won the tender to design, build and operate the Sydney integrated ticketing project, or Tcard as it became known. In 2008 the Government of New South Wales cancelled the Tcard project, with lawsuits in both directions. The government sued ERG for $77 million; ERG counter-sued for $215 million. The claim was settled in February 2012.

== Tcard lawsuits ==
ERG had a contract with the New South Wales Public Transport Ticketing Corporation (PTTC) to develop the Tcard system. The contract was terminated by the New South Wales government on 23 January 2008, and the government announced their intention to recover the project costs of $90 million from ERG.

ERG claimed that the PTTC "had itself materially contributed to the delays associated with the project and ... failed to act reasonably and in good faith", and lodged a countersuit in May 2008 to recover over $215 million in costs.

The NSW government was allowed to withhold some evidence in the case.

The case was settled in February 2012, with the government keeping the $27 million security deposit and Videlli paying a further $5 million in settlement. Both sides bore their own legal expenses.

== Myki project dispute ==
Kamco won the contract for the development of the myki ticketing system in Victoria in 2005 and sub-contracted the installation and repair of myki equipment to ERG, in an A$106 million contract. However, ERG refused to release myki equipment to Kamco claiming "unpaid bills worth $1.8 million". Kamco repudiated the contract in June 2009, arguing a change in ERG's company structure broke their agreement. ERG sued Kamco in the Victorian Supreme Court for a $30 million loss it claimed from the repudiation, and Kamco launched a counter-claim.

== Liquidation ==
After the NSW government terminated the Tcard project, ERG was left with large accumulated costs arising from the project. On 31 December 2008, ERG sold its operating assets to Vix Technology, and paid out its debts. The sale left ERG with its claim against the NSW Government arising from the Tcard contract as its sole asset.

ERG changed its name to Videlli with effect on 11 March 2009 as part of its restructure. Videlli was delisted from the Australian Securities Exchange on 30 June 2009.

Videlli retained a minor shareholding in Vix Technology, finally sold to Vix Holdings Ltd for $5 million in 2013. The one ordinary share had previously been reported in financial statements as having no value.

As at 30 June 2014, Videlli had no assets and had a debt of $21 million to Vix Treasury. The company was inactive, but chose not to liquidate because of the cost of liquidation. The debt arose from borrowing to finance the litigation with the NSW government, referred to below, and its settlement. Administrators were appointed on 29 December 2017, and the company was declared liquidated on 22 February 2018.
