= History of public transport ticketing in New South Wales =

Public transport ticketing in Australia

Public transport ticketing in New South Wales, Australia has operated using a variety of different fare collection systems. Paper tickets were used until 1992, whilst magnetic tickets were used until 2016. The magnetic ticketing system, known variously as AFC, STATS and MyZone, was progressively replaced by a contactless smart card called Opal.

== Paper tickets ==
=== Payment types ===
Flimseys were single bus tickets used between the 1950s and the 1990s. These tickets were printed in blocks of 250 and stapled together.

TravelPasses were periodical multi-modal tickets used between 1983 and 2016. These tickets were introduced under the Wran State Government.

MetroTens were multi-ride bus tickets used between 1985 and 1992. These tickets were based on optical mark recognition.

=== Criticism ===
These early systems, along with the paper tickets used on the rail network, made policing fare compliance somewhat labour-intensive. Originally the railways had ticket collectors or inspectors at the exit of every station. Bus services had drivers, and previously conductors, selling or checking periodical tickets. The cost-saving reduction of ticketing staff on state public transport resulted in the responsibility for fare compliance being transferred from the service operators onto the passengers. This change sometimes resulted in revenue loss. For example, the MetroTen was easily and frequently defrauded by passengers. Of the "el cheapo Metroten ticketing system that the former Labor Government installed", transport minister Bruce Baird told Parliament, "Many people know that rorting has gone on. ... The system is outdated and has outlived its usefulness."

Tackling fare evasion was also at the heart of automated ticketing on the rail network. Baird told Parliament that under the Wran and Unsworth governments, "between 10 and 20 per cent" were checked and that this had risen to "between 50 per cent and 60 per cent" since the Greiner government took office. "With automatic fare collection," Baird told Parliament, "85 per cent of all tickets will be checked regularly. It is estimated that somewhere in the range of $20 million to $30 million each year will be collected by way of revenue that should have been paid for travel on State Rail."

== Magnetic tickets ==
=== AFC ===
The Automated Fare Collection (AFC) system was officially launched on Sydney Ferries services on Monday 10 July 1989, following trial use by Manly Hydrofoil passengers on Friday 7 July. State Transit installed ticket vending machines and ticket barriers at Circular Quay and Manly, the main wharves in its network. The operation of the ferries ticketing system was the focus of a corruption inquiry in 1999.

=== STATS ===
The State Transit Automated Ticketing System (STATS) was officially launched on Sydney and Newcastle bus services on 31 August 1992. The change was heralded by the installation of a Datafare 2000 drivers' console and two AES Prodata green ticket validators in each of State Transit's 1,600 buses. CityRail's adoption of the system was more fraught, occurring late and over budget. Officials blamed the size of the rail system. While State Transit equipped two stops—Circular Quay and Manly—with ticket vending machines, CityRail was required to outfit almost 300 stations with them. The government was forced to allay fears that automated ticketing would mean that more stations would have staffing withdrawn once vending machines were in place. The system, including vending machines and ticket barriers, was introduced to the CityRail network over 12 months between July 1992 and July 1993, at a cost of some $90 million.

The initial ferry implementation (AFC) had its ticket data format revised to the new common standard (STATS). This resulted in State Transit's bus and ferry networks sharing a common ticketing system with the State Rail Authority, with a range of multi-modal magnetic tickets to be introduced. The State Rail Authority also offered combined tickets with private operators, notably BusPlus with private bus operators in Western Sydney and the Central Coast, TramLink with the Sydney Light Rail operator, and Blue Mountains ExplorerLink with the operator of a tourist bus loop in Katoomba.

During this period:

- CityRail issued magnetic single tickets and periodicals covering 7, 14, 28, 90 and 365-days.
- State Transit issued magnetic single tickets, the ten-trip TravelTen, weekly TravelPass periodicals, DayTripper, BusTripper and Pensioner Excursion Tickets (P.E.T.s). The tickets were available at railway stations, newsagents, transit shops and bus depots. DayTripper and P.E.T.s were also available on-board buses.
- Sydney Ferries issued magnetic single tickets, the ten-trip FerryTen, TravelPass periodicals, DayTrippers and P.E.T.s. The tickets were available at major wharves and newsagents.

In June 2019, public testing of a reintroduced STATS system commenced. The system's use is restricted to special excursion trips operated by two Sydney transport heritage groups. The two groups have each had fresh magnetic ticket stock produced.

=== PrePay ===
PrePay was a concept introduced by State Transit in 2004, where a ticket had to be purchased before boarding a bus. This meant that bus tickets could not be bought from the driver. Tickets accepted included the TravelTen, DayTripper and P.E.T.s etc.

Bus stops were PrePay between 7am and 7pm on weekdays. During this time, no cash was accepted on any State Transit route when getting on from any of these stops and a prepaid magnetic ticket had to be used instead. The first bus stop to be trialed and converted to PrePay was the Watson Street bus stop along Military Road in 2004. Subsequently, other busy bus corridors and interchanges were progressively converted to become PrePay. All bus stops within the CBD became PrePay on 22 June 2009.

State Transit introduced its first PrePay service, route 333, in October 2006 between Circular Quay and Bondi Beach. Cash was not accepted at any bus stop along the route during any time of the day. Subsequently, other State Transit limited stops and express routes were also progressively converted to PrePay services. The first five Metrobus routes (M10-M40, M50) were also PrePay services. During the transition to MyZone, magnetic MyZone tickets replaced the older State Transit-only magnetic tickets and became the only tickets accepted on PrePay services. MyZone tickets accepted for PrePay services included MyMulti tickets, MyBus TravelTen tickets, Family Funday Sunday and P.E.T.s. The Opal card is accepted for PrePay services.

PrePay was also introduced to other bus operators, such as Forest Coach Lines services, at certain bus stops at certain times on weekdays. Commencing in 2018, all bus routes were progressively converted to PrePay by region. On 28 October 2019, the last routes within the CBD became cashless so that specific cashless stops within that area were no longer used. During the COVID-19 pandemic, all Opal bus services became cashless.

=== MyZone ===
In April 2010, the ticketing system was expanded and rebranded to MyZone. The system launched new fare products and standardised fare product names and ticket designs across trains, buses and ferries; and brought privately operated buses into the same fare structure as those operated by the State Transit Authority. Limited integration with the then privately owned light rail system was added in 2011. For many passengers, particularly those travelling longer distances, the reduction in the number of fare bands meant substantial price cuts for public transport. However, critics noted that MyZone represented little more than a redesign of tickets, and pointed to the Labor government's failure to implement Tcard, a smart card system abandoned following trials in 2007. Like the previous ticketing range, MyZone used the existing magnetic automated fare collection system on trains, government buses and ferries. Private bus services and the light rail required manual checking or validation of the ticket by the driver or conductor.

==== History ====
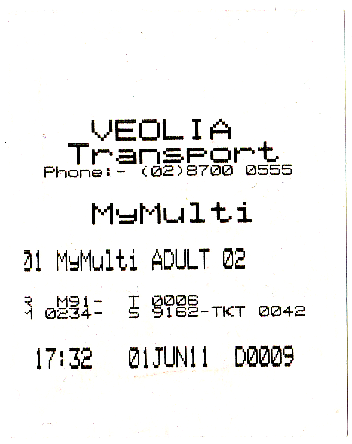
Bus ticket

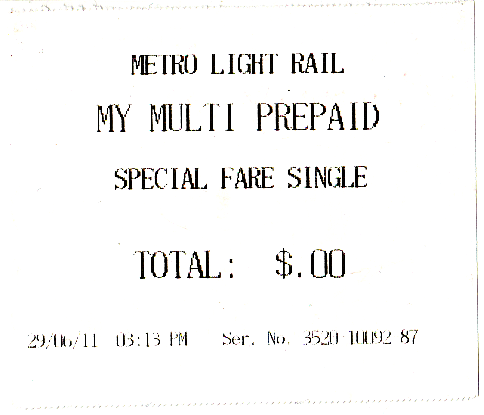
Light rail ticket

Tickets issued to passengers using privately operated Veolia Transport NSW and Metro Light Rail services upon presentation of a MyMulti ticket

MyZone was designed to simplify the city's claimed complex fare system, reducing the 20 train fare zones to five, the five bus zones to three, and the five ferry zones to two, thus removing one of the reported stumbling blocks to the integration of ticketing and the introduction of a smart card. The changes were welcomed by Infrastructure Partnerships Australia, but criticised by the Independent Pricing and Regulatory Tribunal, which was not consulted and by the Independent Public Inquiry into a Long-Term Public Transport Plan for Sydney. The lobby group Action for Public Transport welcomed the changes with some reservations.

Then Shadow Minister for Transport Gladys Berejiklian criticised the MyZone system, claiming the government merely replaced one clumsy system for another. She encouraged the replacement of the paper-based ticketing system with an electronic one.

In June 2011, the MyZone system was extended to the then privately owned light rail system. MyMulti tickets and the non-MyZone Pensioner Excursion Ticket and Family Funday Sunday were recognised on the light rail.

In September 2013, changes were made to MyMulti eligibility on ferries, with usage restrictions replacing unrestricted travel. MyMulti 1 tickets were no longer accepted and the MyMulti 2 could only be used for journeys up to 9 km. The MyMulti 3 continued to offer unrestricted travel.

Magnetic tickets were retired in stages:

- From 1 June 2014, Pensioner Excursion Tickets, MyMulti Daypass and Family Funday Sunday tickets were no longer available for purchase onboard all State Transit buses.
- From 1 September 2014, 14 tickets (mostly periodicals) were withdrawn.
- From 20 November 2014, 11 tickets (Newcastle-specific) were withdrawn.
- From 1 January 2016, all other paper tickets were withdrawn except single bus tickets, and single and return tickets for trains, ferries and light rail.
- From 1 August 2016, the last remaining tickets were withdrawn.

==== Payment types ====
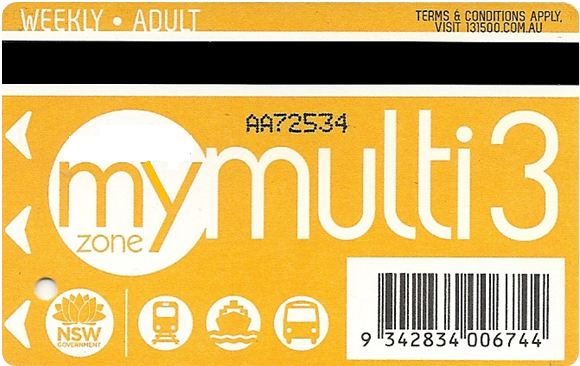
MyMulti 3 weekly ticket

MyZone consisted of four main ticket types: MyTrain, MyBus, MyFerry and MyMulti.

Existing single, return, weekly and other periodical train ticket products were rebranded as "MyTrain", and the number of fare bands was reduced to five. Train fares continued to be based on distance. Periodical ticket discounts remained unchanged.

Existing bus ticket products were rebranded as "MyBus TravelTen", and the number of fare bands was reduced to three. Bus fares continued to be based on sections. The tickets became valid for travel on privately operated buses for the first time requiring manual validation by drivers instead of machine validation like on State Transit services.

Existing ferry ticket products were rebranded as "MyFerry TravelTen".

Existing multi-modal tickets TravelPass, DayTripper and BusPlus were replaced with a series of periodical train, bus and ferry tickets called MyMulti. A MyMulti ticket offered unlimited bus and ferry travel and train travel within a given zone. Zone MyMulti1 covered inner city trains, MyMulti2 covered most of the suburban Sydney train network and MyMulti3 covered all suburban, intercity and regional trains of the CityRail network.

The introduction of MyZone did not alter the existing TravelPass, TimeTen or timed ticket products used in Newcastle. All Sydney TravelPass tickets remained valid until the magnetic ticketing system was no longer available from 1 August 2016.

==== Gallery ====
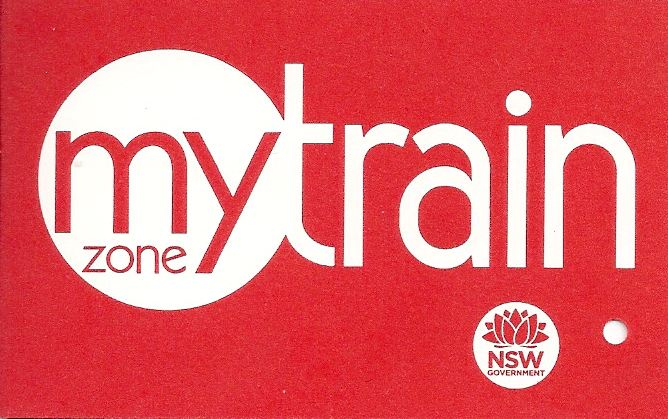
MyTrain ticket

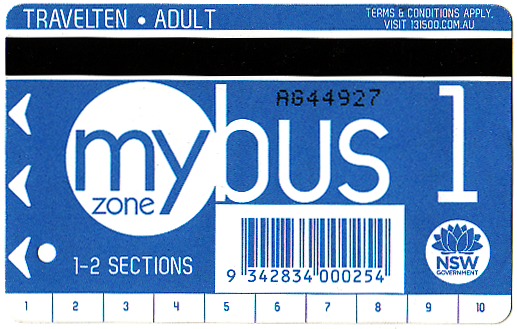
MyBus ticket

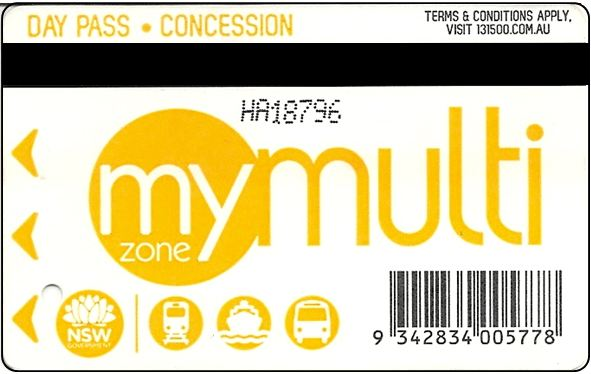
MyMulti ticket

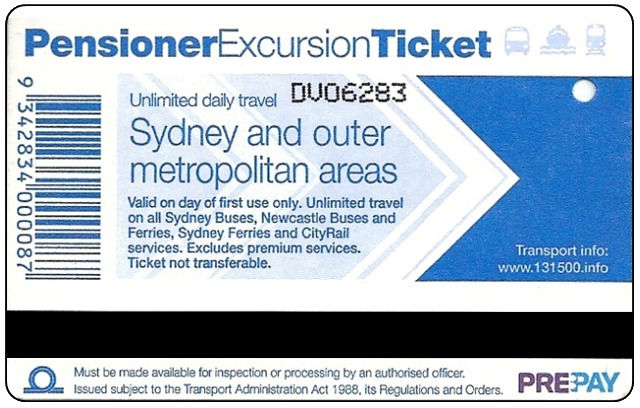
Pensioner Excursion Ticket

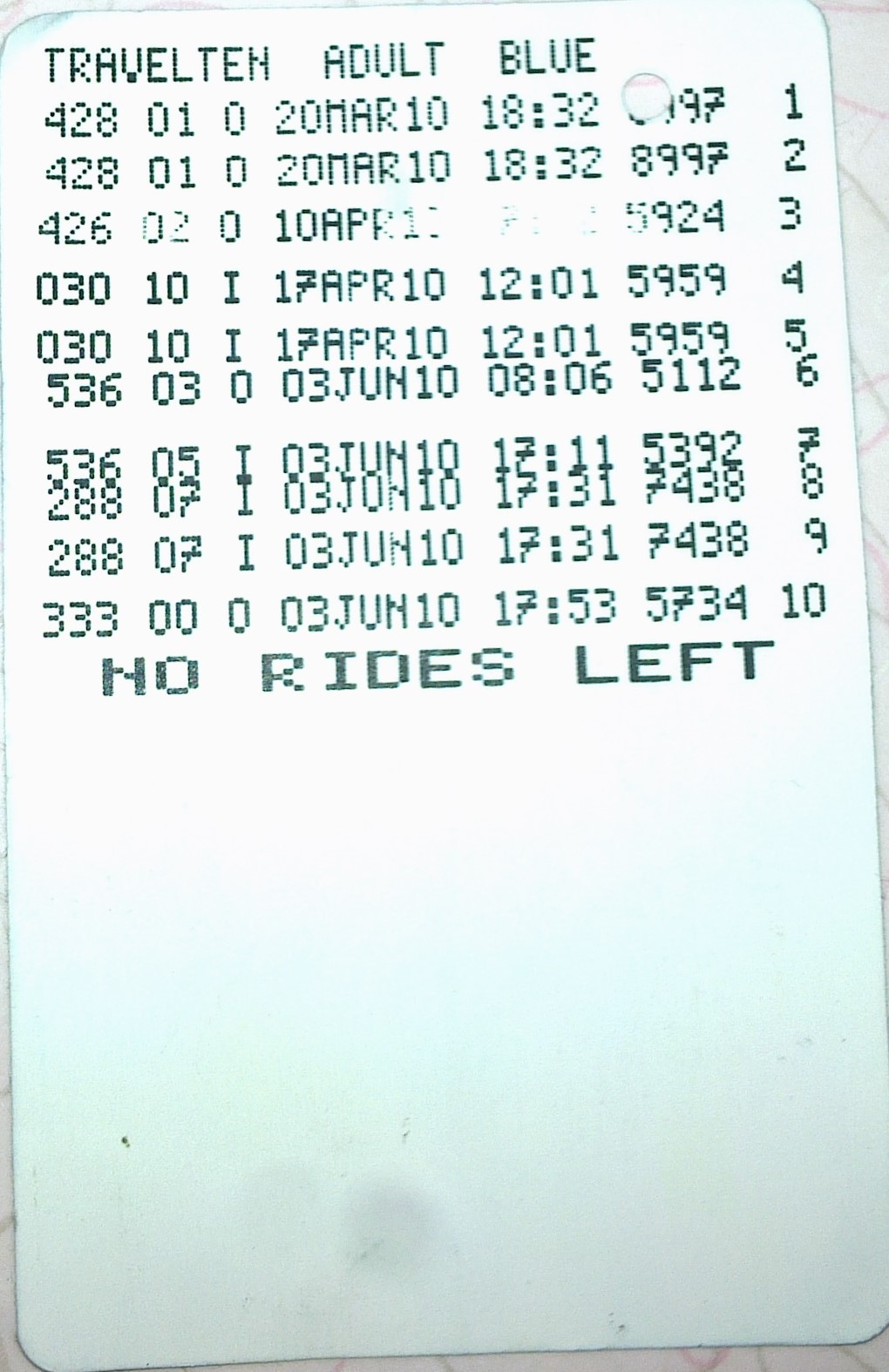
MyBus TravelTen

== Smart cards ==
Tcard logo

=== Tcard ===
Tcard was a failed attempt to introduce an inter-modal stored-value smart card ticketing system, similar to Hong Kong's Octopus Card, originally intended to be in place before the 2000 Sydney Olympics.

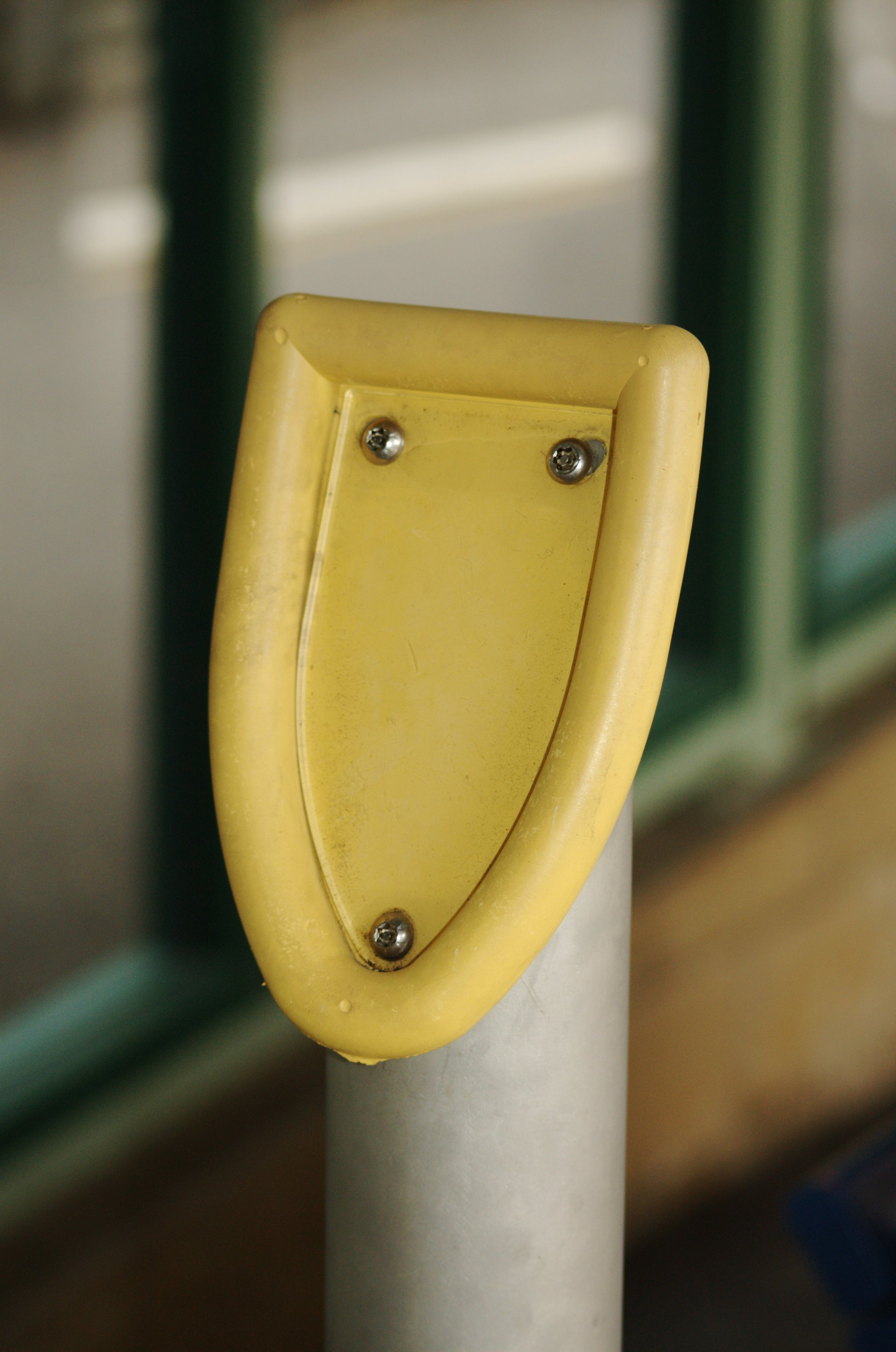
Mounts for the T-Card readers were installed at CityRail stations. The readers themselves were never installed.

The system was first announced by the Government of New South Wales in 1996. Like the seamless transition from paper to magnetic tickets, it was initially anticipated the full range of existing magnetic tickets (including TravelPass periodicals) would be transitioned across to the new smart cards.

The Government put the project up for tender, but the award of the contract was paused due to legal action taken by an unsuccessful tenderer. The contract to install and operate Tcard was finalised and awarded to the ERG Group in 2002.

In 2005, a limited trial of the technology involving school children using the School Student Transport Scheme was undertaken, and expanded to cover all private-sector bus services in 2006.

In 2006, in a bid to ease the transition to Tcard, the government established the Public Transport Ticketing Corporation. Originally slated for a 2007 introduction, the Tcard rollout timetable project was pushed back. Ridiculing the revised timetable, opposition transport spokesman Barry O'Farrell told Parliament that "The only smart move by the Minister for Transport is putting off implementation of the full operation of the Tcard until after the 2007 state election campaign." In the same year, the future of the project was in doubt as ERG Group was forced to borrow $14 million to prop up company finances. The government moved to renegotiate the contract, having already spent $54 million.

In August 2006, commuter field trials were held on selected lines of Sydney Buses and the Punchbowl Bus Company. The trials hit a hitch when bus drivers threatened a boycott due to the machine crashing when printing tickets, distracting drivers, which in turn led to alleged safety issues. One bus driver claimed to have been so distracted by a Tcard machine that he forgot to put on the handbrake and the bus rolled 10 metres into a council garden from a stop on the steep road at the Balmain East terminus; other explanations of this and similar 'bus rollaway' incidents are plausible. Discontent among workers involved with the trial renewed calls for the Tcard system to be scrapped. The Tcard bus trial was being conducted during negotiation of a new enterprise agreement, and it is possible that the trial was being used as leverage, by the RTBU, in wage negotiations.

In April 2007, an official letter from the Public Transport Ticketing Corporation was sent to ERG Group expressing numerous concerns, such as software problems dogging the project.

On 9 November 2007, the Government of NSW issued a notice of intention to terminate the contract with ERG. On 23 January 2008, the NSW government announced it had terminated the contract and would be seeking to recover $95 million from ERG.ERG Group and the independent regulator attributed some of the delays to CityRail's complex fare structure.

On 18 March 2008, the School Student Transport Scheme Tcard system was switched off in response to the terminated contract.

On 3 July 2008, after three months of a terminated contract and a $200 million lawsuit by ERG Group, it was revealed that the a smartcard system project had been revived by cabinet. This decision also required the state government to change the structure of its fare system to suit the new system.

On 17 February 2012, the Tcard legal dispute was settled.

=== Opal card ===
In April 2010, the Government of New South Wales announced that a new contract had been awarded to the Pearl Consortium for the rollout of a new ticketing system. In September 2011, it was announced that the new system would be called Opal. The Opal system was officially launched on 7 December 2012.

== See also ==
- Metcard – Melbourne's former public transport ticketing system
- MultiRider – Perth's former public transport ticketing system
