= John Caine =

John Caine may refer to:

- John T. Caine (1829–1911), British-born American politician
- John Caine (athletic director) (1924–2010), American college basketball coach and athletic director
- John Caine (playwright) (fl. 1962–1987), British author and playwright
- John Caine (runner) (born 1946), English long-distance runner
- John D. Caine (born 1968), United States Air Force general

== See also ==
- John Cain (disambiguation)
- John Kane (disambiguation)
- Sir John Du Cane (1865–1947), British Army general
- John Cena (born 1977), American actor and professional wrestler
