= John Kane (footballer, born 1960) =

English footballer

Personal information
- Full name: John Peter Kane
- Date of birth: 15 December 1960 (age 65)
- Place of birth: Hackney, England
- Position: Central defender

Senior career*
Years	Team	Apps	(Gls)
1978–1980	Orient	1	(0)
- Rainham Town
- Leytonstone & Ilford
- Walthamstow Avenue
- Redbridge Forest
- * Club domestic league appearances and goals

John Peter Kane (born 15 December 1960) is an English former professional footballer who played as a central defender in the Football League for Orient. He also played non-league football in the Essex area for clubs including Rainham Town, Leytonstone & Ilford, Walthamstow Avenue and Redbridge Forest.
