= Metcard =

Former public transport ticketing system in Melbourne, Australia

- Location: Melbourne
- Launched: May 1998
- Discontinued: December 2012
- Successor: Myki
- Manager: Transport Ticketing Authority
- Currency: AUD
- Retailed: Online; Telephone; Newsagents; Stations

Metcard was the brand name of an integrated ticketing system used to access public transport in Melbourne, Australia. It was a universal ticket which allowed users to ride on the city's Metlink and Metropolitan Transit Authority network, consisting of suburban trains, trams, and buses, including the NightRider network. The Metcard was a credit card-sized ticket made out of cardboard and used a magnetic strip to store fare data. Metcard was operated by OneLink Transit Systems under a contract with the Government of Victoria which was managed by the Transport Ticketing Authority.

== History ==
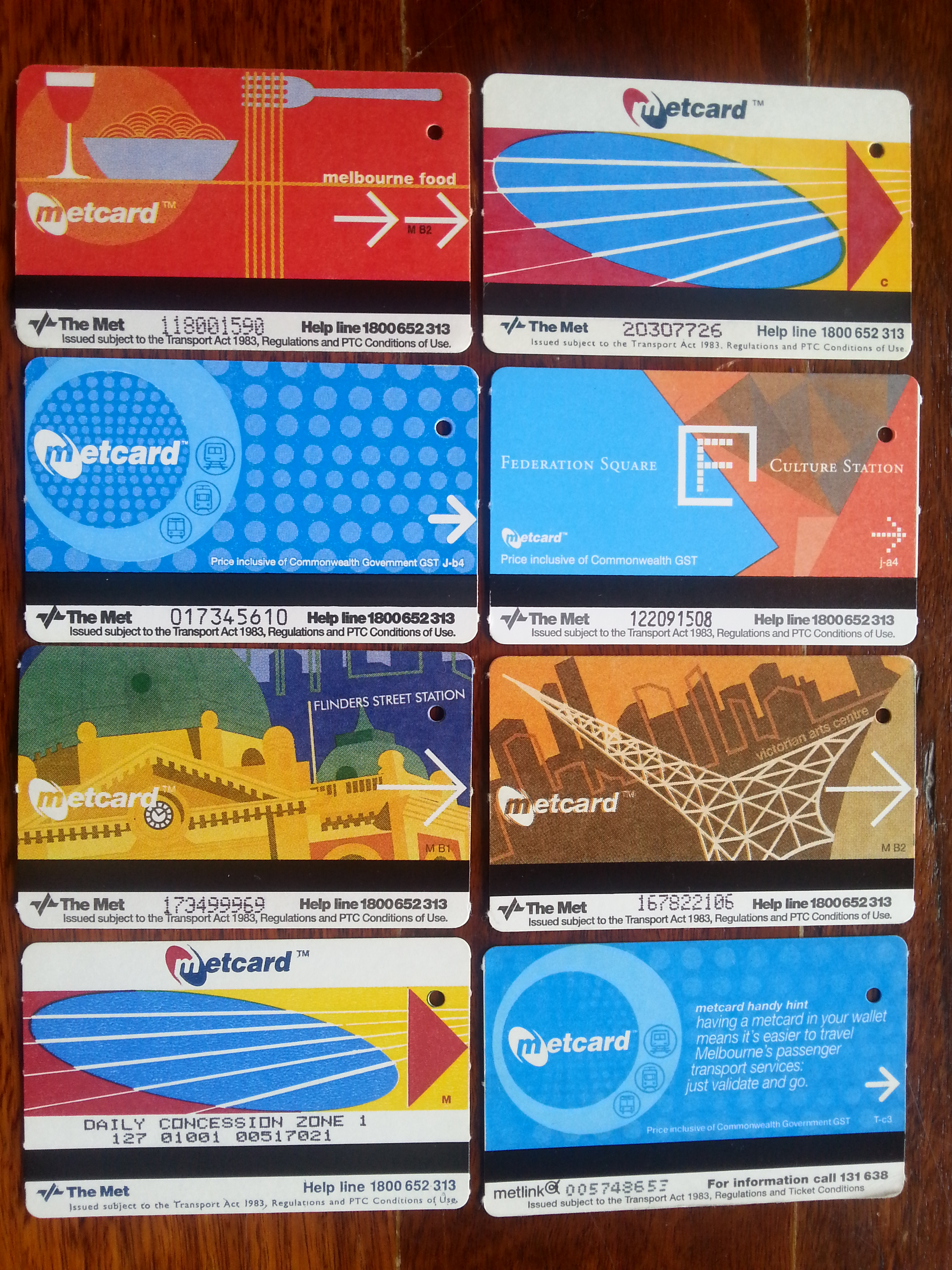
Several Metcards

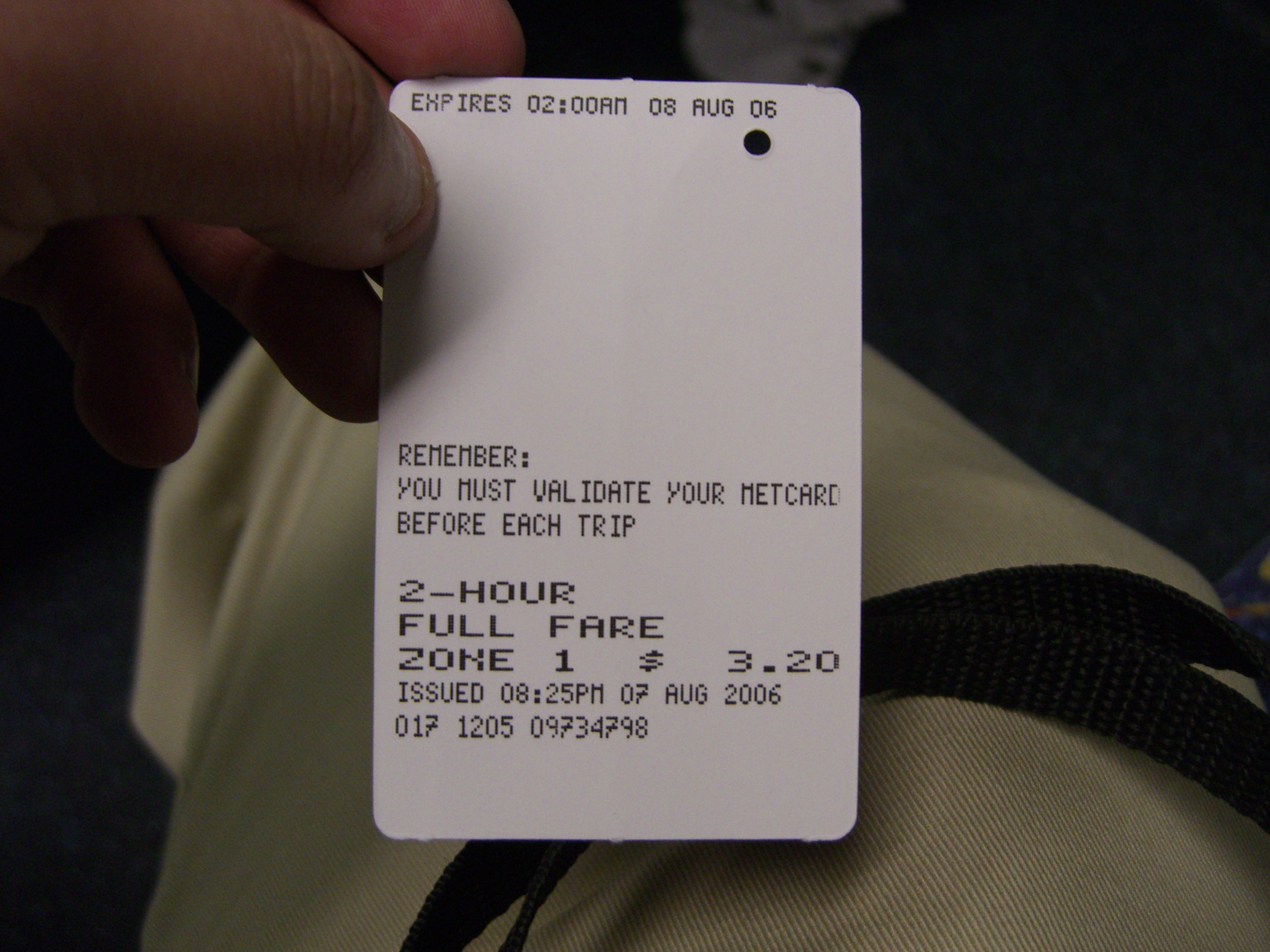
Back of a validated Metcard

=== Rollout ===
The Metropolitan Transit Authority was formed to integrate Melbourne's tram, train and bus services in July 1983. The Metropolitan Transit Authority also integrated bus, train and tram ticketing using punch card and scratch card tickets. Under the arrangements, the Government of Victoria collected all revenue from the sale of multi-modal tickets, which was then allocated to the various operators on the basis of an agreed formula.

Moves towards automated ticketing were first made in 1992. Tenders were called for the design, supply, installation and on-going maintenance of the system, with the OneLink Transit Consortium becoming the preferred tenderer in September 1993. The contract was signed in May 1994, with the major technology supplier being the ERG Group (now Vix Technology).

Testing of prototypes commenced in December 1993, and the roll-out of the system was carried out from August 1996 to April 1998. Public field trials were carried out on buses from 20 August 1996 and trains from 18 September 1996. Acceptance occurred in November 1997. The system commenced full revenue service from May 1998 at a cost of $330 million. Contractual issues between OneLink and the Victorian Government were not settled until May 2002 with the payment of up to $65 million in a staged settlement.

In 2002, Metcard replaced the functionally identical yet technically simpler punch tickets and scratchie tickets which were easy to cheat.

In April 2006, V/Line tickets were aligned with the Metcard system, with each V/Line ticket to stations in the Metcard area having the relevant zones printed on them.

In March 2007, Nightrider tickets were aligned with the Metcard system. That same year, zone 3 of the system was abolished. Also that same year, the contract with OneLink was amended to permit the system to be extended and modified with the contract being able to be terminated with six months notice.

In 2008, the new route 401 bus service from North Melbourne railway station to the Royal Melbourne Hospital and University of Melbourne became the first and only bus route in Melbourne that required the purchase of a Metcard before travel.

=== Replacement ===
In 2008, the Metcard system was scheduled to be replaced by myki, a contactless smart card ticketing system which would cover all public transport in the state. However, in February 2008, Victorian Public Transport Minister Lynne Kosky announced that the full roll out of the system would not begin until the end of 2008. Approximately 7 weeks later, the system was delayed for approximately 2 years, with an announcement that the service was now scheduled to begin its roll out in 2009, but not be fully operational until some time in 2010. The system was finally introduced on 29 December 2009, but only for metropolitan train services, and was introduced on bus and tram services on 25 July 2010.

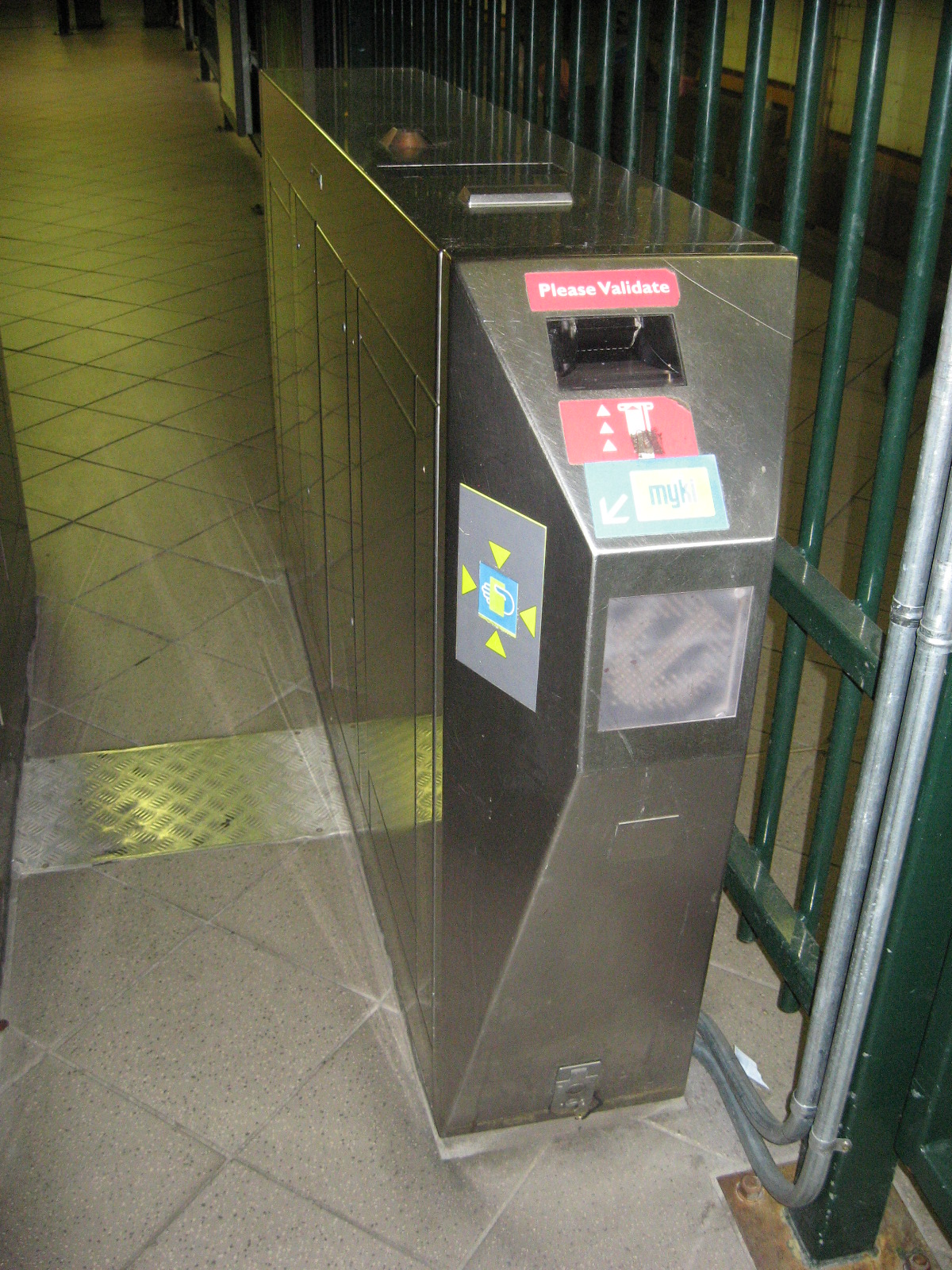
A Metcard gate at Flinders Street station that has been modified to accept Myki. Myki and Metcard were allowed to coexist with each other, but Metcard was eventually phased out in favour of Myki.

Following the change of government in November 2010, an enquiry was held into the future of myki, with various options considered including whether to proceed with it, modify its introduction, or scrap it altogether and retain Metcard. In June 2011, the Victorian Government confirmed that the roll-out of myki would continue and that Metcards would no longer be available after December 2012.

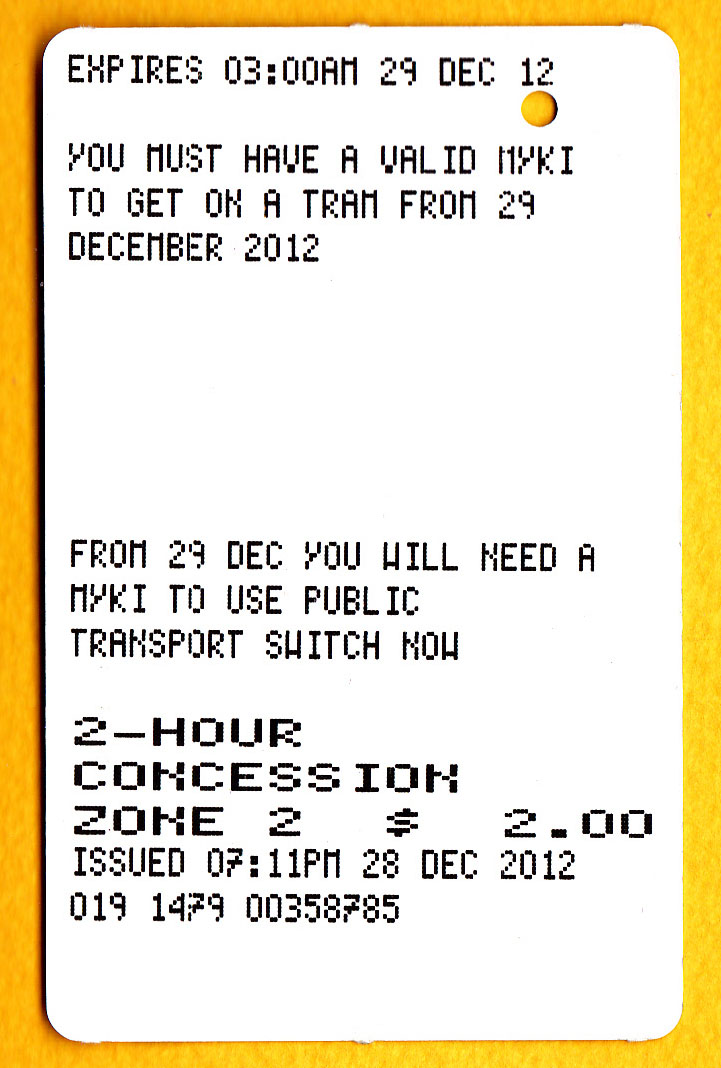
A ticket issued during the last hours of Metcard

The withdrawal of the Metcard system commenced on 2 January 2012. All remaining Metcards were withdrawn from sale at 3:00 am on 29 December 2012. Unused Metcards were no longer valid tickets.

Metcard withdrawal timeline:

- From 2 January 2012, the withdrawal of Metcard began by discontinuing online and over-the-phone sales of all Metcards, and general sales of yearly Metcards.
- From January to March 2012, Myki sales from vending machines were rolled out across Melbourne metropolitan railway stations, major tram stops and bus interchanges.
- From January to July 2012, Metcard machines were shut down and removed from Melbourne metropolitan railway stations, commencing with Flagstaff Station in the week of 30 January - 3 February and culminating with the last Metcard vending machine being removed from Southern Cross station during the week of 23–27 July. Metcard vending machines at other locations were also withdrawn during this time period.
- From February to April 2012, Metcards were progressively withdrawn from sale at retail outlets as Myki sales were progressively introduced.
- From 26 March 2012, weekly and monthly Metcards were withdrawn from sale, followed by "value" Metcards (all multi-period, Sunday Saver and off-peak daily Metcards) on 2 July.
- From 27 August 2012, Metcard sales at premium station ticket offices were progressively replaced by Myki sales or top ups, starting at Williamstown station, and finishing at Flagstaff station.
- From 12 October 2012, Metcard/Myki hybrid barriers at railway stations were progressively replaced with Myki-only barriers. This process continued through until March 2013.
- From 1 November 2012, the PTV Hub (Met Shop) in Swanston Street had ceased its Metcard sales which were replaced by Myki devices.
- From 12 November 2012, the TTA announced that the progressive removal of Metcard validators at railway stations had commenced on a station-by-station basis. All railway station validators were removed by mid-December.
- Friday, 28 December 2012, was the final day of Metcard sales on trams and buses, as well as all other Metcard use. After this date, Metcard ticket vending machines on trams had been de-activated, meaning that passengers needed to have a Myki before boarding, or risk a fine.
- From 29 December 2012, Metcard equipment on buses and trams was deactivated, meaning Melbourne bus passengers had to purchase a Myki before boarding.
- From 1 February 2013, Metcard equipment on buses and trams was removed and replaced by new Myki only top-up machines.
- From 30 June 2013, PTV ceased its Metcard refund and transfer to Myki service, which had allowed people with unused or partly used Metcards to transfer their remaining value to a new or existing Myki card.

== Fares ==
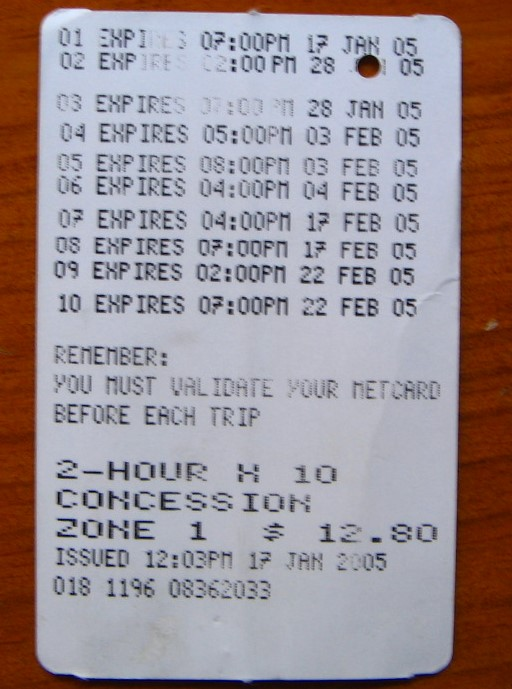
Multiple-use Metcards for 10 trips were also available

Metcard tickets functioned within a zonal system. Melbourne was divided into two zones: Zone 1 (Yellow) and Zone 2 (Blue). Until 2007, there was also a Zone 3 (Red), but this was abolished by extending Zone 2 to all areas covered by Zone 3. The two zones formed concentric rings, with Zone 1 comprising the inner suburbs, and Zone 2 covering the remainder of metropolitan Melbourne. Zone 3 covered the outer eastern, southern and south-eastern metropolitan area. Zone overlap areas existed on the borders of the zones. In these areas tickets for either zone were acceptable. The fare payable was dependent on the zone or zones in which the passenger travelled, with higher fares for trips that included both travel zones

A separate fare and ticketing system existed for V/Line (country) services. Beyond April 2006, holders of V/Line tickets to Melbourne were able to access both Zone 1 and 2 without needing to purchase another ticket. V/Line tickets to Zone 2 stations were valid for Zone 2 only. Fares in most towns just outside Melbourne were also aligned to Zone 2 prices.

A range of tickets were available, including two-hour, all-day, weekly, monthly and annual tickets. There were also concession tickets for students, seniors and others. In 2010, a daily Zone 1 and 2 full-fare ticket cost A$2.70, and a weekly Zone 1 and 2 ticket cost A$10.40. Prices generally rose by inflation (CPI) on 1 January each year, though there were occasionally increases higher than the CPI.

== Infrastructure ==
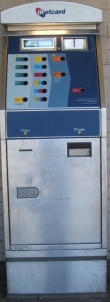
A 'small' MVM 1 Metcard vending machine

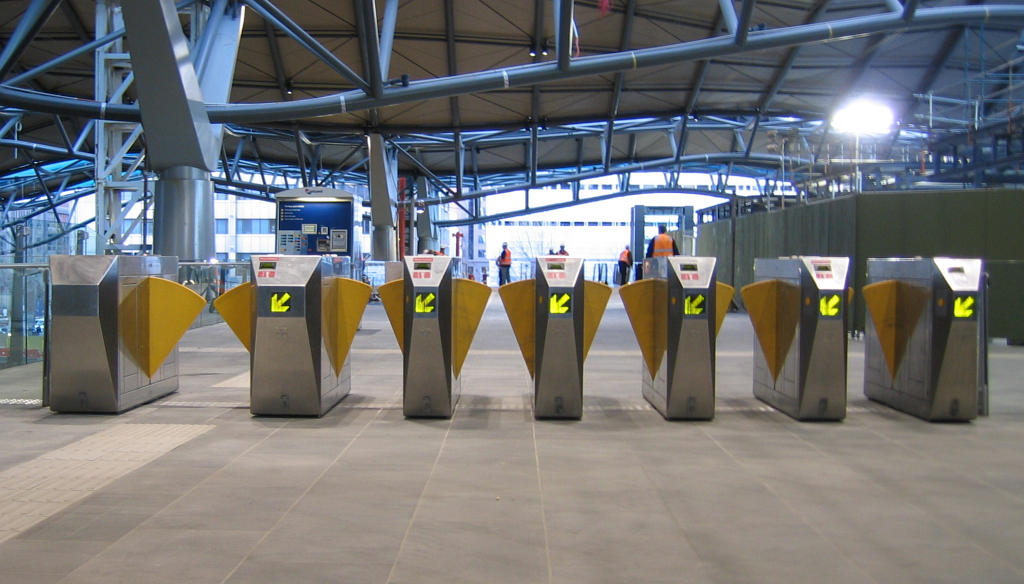
Metcard-operated barrier gates at Southern Cross station

When the system was in full operation, Metcards could be purchased from:

- Ticket vending machines at rail stations
- Ticket vending machines on board trams (coin only) and Stony Point trains
- Bus drivers
- Premium (staffed) stations
- The Met Shop (inside the Melbourne Town Hall on Swanston Street)
- Authorised Metcard outlets such as newsagencies and milk bars
- Online
- By phone

Ticket availability varied, with the sources above each stocking slightly different ranges beyond the standard two-hour, daily and seniors tickets. Availability on board buses was particularly restricted, with neither the Sunday Saver nor off-peak tickets being available from drivers. Similarly, ticket vending machines at railway stations did not stock Sunday Savers or some types of off-peak tickets. Payment options varied from coin-only (small Metcard machines on trams and at railway stations), EFTPOS, coin and some notes (large ticket machines at stations) to EFTPOS, credit card, coin and all notes (premium railway stations).

Metcards were 'validated' when entering or exiting railway stations, and getting on trams or buses. The first validation printed an expiry date and time on the back of the ticket. Subsequent validations of most types of tickets did not print extra times but the data was intended to be used to count passenger numbers (in order to improve transport services). Revalidation of already validated tickets, whilst functionally unnecessary, was still required by law and occasional campaigns reminded passengers of this. When transport operations were franchised, revalidation data was also used to apportion revenue share between operators. This was later abandoned in favour of fixed percentage allocations (40% train, 40% tram and 20% bus).

With most railway stations not having ticket-operated barriers and trams not having conductors, enforcement was the responsibility of roaming Authorised Officers (ticket inspectors). Authorised Officers (AOs) checked that passengers had the correct ticket and, if using a concession ticket, a suitable concession card. AOs did not issue fines directly but issued an infringement notice. The passenger then received a letter from the Department of Transport, who could have issued a fine. Passengers could either pay the fine, seek an internal review, or contest it in court.

== Criticism ==
Criticism surrounded Metcard due to cost over-runs, the abolition of tram conductors and the unreliability of ticket purchasing and validation machines. The ticket vending machines were frequently attacked by vandals (often by pouring liquids into the coin slot), and underwent several revisions to their design.

An audit released by the Victorian Government in 2001 showed over 1 in 4 (27.2%) of machines at railway stations did not work, and 11.9% of mobile equipment in buses and trams were non-operational. The State Government renegotiated with ticketing network contract operator OneLink Transit Systems to improve the service for commuters. Following these improvements, a 2002 audit showed an increase in availability of machines to 92.1% at railway stations, and 98.3% on buses and trams. Usability was also improved, with tram machines able to sell daily tickets. Furthermore, vandalism across the network dropped by 62% between 2001 and 2002.

== See also ==
- MyZone – Sydney's former public transport ticketing system
- MultiRider – Perth's former public transport ticketing system
