= Vix Technology =

Australian electronics company

- Type: Private
- Industry: public transport technology, fare collection
- Headquarters: Perth, Australia
- Key people: Steve Gallagher (Chairman); Aaron Ross (CEO); Harry Singh (CFO)
- Products: smart card automated fare collection systems and intelligent transportation systems
- Website: vixtechnology.com

Vix Technology (Vix) is an Australian company that designs, supplies and operates automated fare collection (AFC) systems, intelligent transportation systems (ITS), access, payment and passenger information display systems (PIDS) for the public transit industry.

The company has designed, supplied and operated systems for cities and operators worldwide, including Hong Kong's Octopus card system, Seattle's ORCA card system, and Stockholm's SL Access system.

== History ==
In 2009, Vix Technology acquired the assets of the former ERG Group, when ERG restructured and changed its name to Videlli Limited. In 2010, Vix Technology acquired ACIS, a UK-based supplier of ITS and PIDS solutions. In 2011, Vix Technology launched a rebranding of the company, integrating all of its business under one brand "Vix".

== Major contracts ==
=== Hong Kong ===
ERG developed the components of the Octopus card system for Hong Kong. The system was completed in September 1997 and remains the largest transit smart card project in the world with over 14 million transactions per day.

=== San Francisco ===
In April 1999 the ERG-Motorola alliance was contracted to the largest smart card project in United States to design, build, operate and maintain the Clipper (then called TransLink) fare payment system in the San Francisco Bay Area. The contract encompasses the six largest transit operators, including buses, light, medium and heavy rail carriers, and ferries. Muni and Caltrain began accepting TransLink on all routes starting in September 2008. Bay Area Rapid Transit (BART) began accepting it in early 2009, followed by SamTrans and Santa Clara VTA. However, when Motorola withdrew from the contract, the MTC refused to assign it solely to ERG because it was concerned that ERG had insufficient operating capital. On 27 May 2009, the contract was assigned from Motorola and ERG to Cubic Transportation Systems. TransLink was renamed Clipper and officially launched on 16 June 2010 with Cubic as the operational partner.

=== Stockholm ===
In April 2003, ERG signed a contract with Stockholm's public transport authority, Storstockholms Lokaltrafik (SL) to implement a smart card based fare collection system. The contract involved the upgrade of the current rail and metro magnetic ticketing system to contactless smart cards, together with the extension of the system to the bus network, sales outlets, and new ticket vending machines. The contract included the issuing of over one million cards. The system went into public trial from September 2008 and became widely available to the public in 2009.

During 2021 SL started to phase out the system and it was shut down in March 2023.

=== Singapore ===
In 1999, the ERG-Motorola alliance won a contract in Singapore to design and install an integrated smart card ticketing system known as EZ-Link for the Land Transport Authority. On 13 April 2002, the smart card ticketing system went into full service on Singapore's public transport network. At the end of the first week in operation it was processing more than 500,000 transactions per day, a figure that has now risen to more than seven million. EZ-Link is now one of the largest integrated smart card based transit systems in the world with more than 22,000 readers in place across the five transit operators covering bus, rail and light rail.

=== Cape Town ===
Vix was appointed as the AFC technology partner in 2011 for the supply of a fully automated fare collection system for the city's new multimillion-dollar bus rapid transit system. The contract embraces the supply of all software and hardware. The roll-out commenced in October 2011.

=== Seattle ===
In April 2003, ERG signed a contract with the Regional Fare Coordination System (RFCS), a group of seven transit agencies surrounding the Puget Sound, to create and operate the smart card ticketing system known as ORCA (One Regional Card for All). The card serves those in Seattle, Tacoma, Everett, Bremerton, and the surrounding areas. In April 2009, the ORCA card began processing fares for buses, light rail, heavy rail, ferries, and vanpool services. In addition to processing fares for adults, youths, and seniors, the contract includes issuing smart cards, clearinghouse services, business and institutional accounts, and operations and maintenance. Even though the system is now in the operations and maintenance phase, the RFCS continues to expand the system. Rapid Ride was added in 2009 and Seattle Monorail was added in 2019. In 2018, Vix lost the contract for the next generation ORCA card system to competitor INIT.

=== Other ===
Vix (ERG) has also designed, developed, and operated solutions in the following locations:

- Ashdod, Israel
- Bangkok, Thailand
- Beijing, China
- Boston, USA
- Bouches Du Rhone, France
- Brest, France
- Brighton and Hove, United Kingdom
- Cape Town, South Africa
- Clermont, France
- Dijon, France
- Gothenburg, Sweden
- Grenoble, France
- Tehran, Iran
- Sydney, Australia
- Las Vegas (Monorail), USA
- London, United Kingdom
- Melbourne, Australia
- Edmonton Metropolitan Region, Canada
- Netanya, Israel
- Oslo, Norway
- Seattle / Puget Sound Region, USA
- Pau, France
- Phoenix, USA
- Rome, Italy
- Stockholm, Sweden
- Tel Aviv, Israel
- Toowoomba, Australia
- Toulon, France
- Tours, France
- Utah, USA
- Valenciennes, France

== Financial misconduct ==
In March 2025 the US arm of the company agreed to pay over $2,000,000 in an out-of-court settlement, after the Department of Justice found that, during the COVID-19 pandemic, it had misreported its employee numbers in order to claim financial assistance as part of the Paycheck Protection Program.

== Awards ==
- 2017 UK National Transport Awards: Transport Supplier of the Year - Joint Winner
- 2018 Transport Ticketing Global: Best Smart Ticketing Programme Award - Winner
- 2021 Australian Good Design Awards: Product Design - Commercial and Industry category - Gold Accolade
- 2021 INCITE Awards: Dr Mal Bryce Tech Company of the Year - Winner
- 2021 HRD Australian HR Awards: Best Remote Work Strategy - Winner
