= John Kane (actor) =

Irish actor

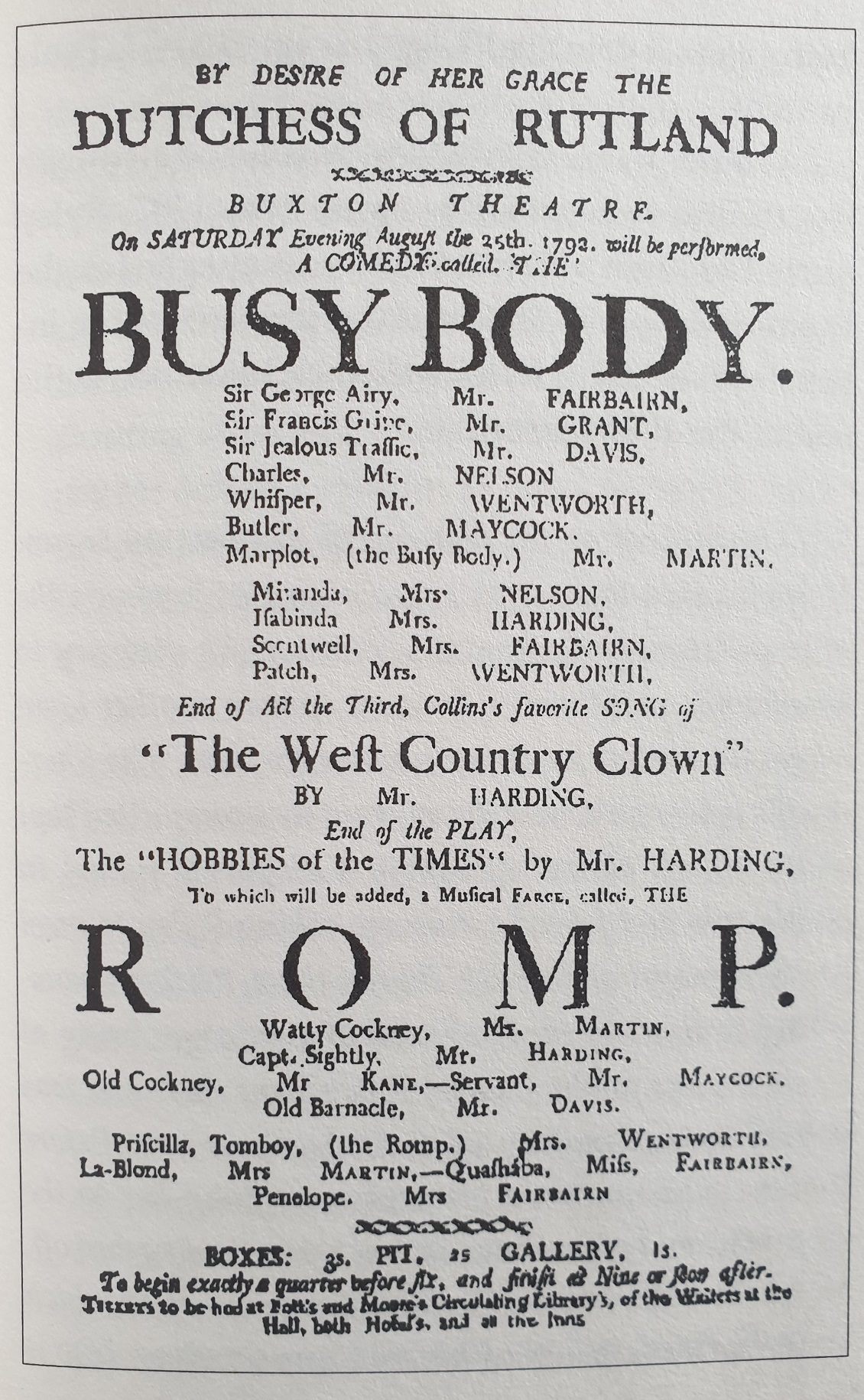
Buxton Theatre Playbill 25 August 1792

John Kane (1746 in Ireland – 1799 in Buxton, Derbyshire) was an 18th-century actor and comedian of considerable distinction who died in 1799, with his death involving a poisonous plant, perhaps hemlock or Aconitum.

Like the majority of his profession at the time, he moved around the country performing and spent a lot of his time in England. The playbill for the Buxton Theatre from 25 August 1792 shows that he was playing the 'Old Cockney' character in a farce called Romp. It was while fulfilling an engagement at the Buxton Theatre that he died.

According to popular folklore Kane had a large appetite and particularly enjoyed roast beef with horseradish sauce. In 1799 in Buxton, whoever prepared the dish for Kane had accidentally gathered Conium maculatum (the European species of hemlock) instead of wild horseradish.

His grave can be seen at the rear of St. Anne's churchyard in Buxton. Because of his fame during his lifetime and distinction of his having literally 'eaten himself to death', the gravestone has become a listed monument.

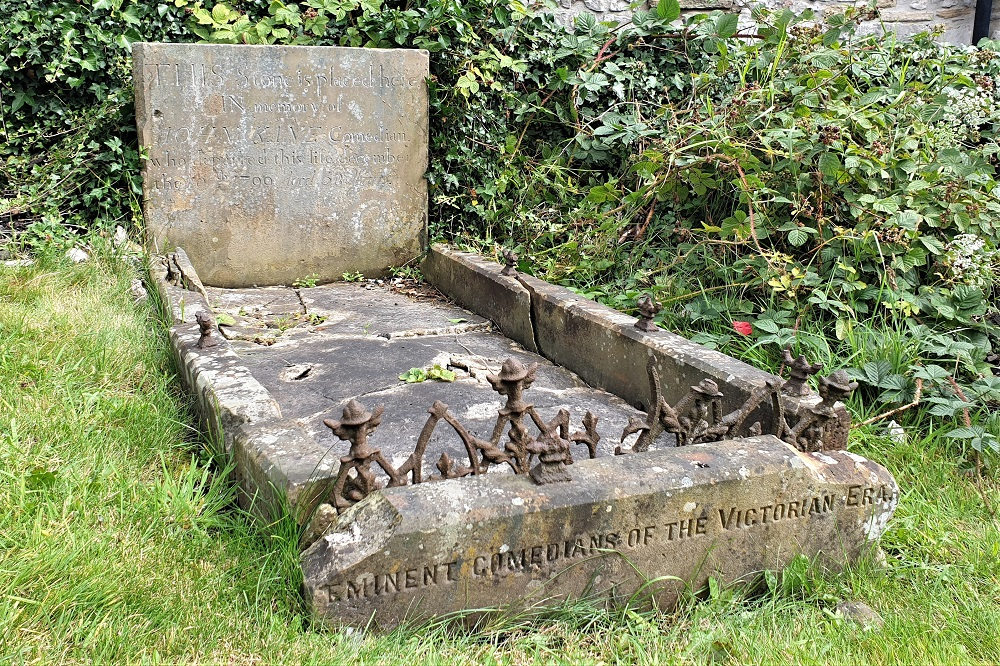
John Kane's tombstone
