= John Kain (rugby league) =

English rugby league footballer and coach

Playing information
Club
Years	Team	Pld	T	G	FG	P
1976–78	Castleford	29	7	0	0	21

Coaching information
Club
Years	Team	Gms	W	D	L	W%
1997–98	Keighley Cougars	0	0	0	0

John Kain is a former professional rugby league footballer who played in the 1970s. He played at club level for Castleford.
