= John Cain =

John Cain may refer to:

== Sportsmen ==
- John Cain (rugby union), English rugby union player
- John Paul Cain (1936–2017), American golfer
- Johnny Cain (1908–1977), American football player, college sports coach and administrator

== Politicians ==
- John Cain (34th Premier of Victoria) (1882–1957), Australian politician
- John Cain (41st Premier of Victoria) (1931–2019), Australian politician, son of the above
  - John Cain Arena, sports arena in Melbourne, Australia, named after the above politician
- John Cain (lawyer), Victorian Government Solicitor (2006–2011), grandson of the 34th and son of the 41st premier of Victoria
- John Edward Cain (1887–1981), American politician
- John J. Cain (1861–1937), American mayor of Bayonne, New Jersey

== Others ==
- John Vincent Cain (1907–1940), British fraudster

== See also ==
- John McCain (disambiguation)
- John Caine (disambiguation)
- Jonathan Cain (born 1950), American musician
- John Kane (disambiguation)
