= Keane (company) =

American IT company

- Industry: IT consulting Software Services; Application Outsourcing; Business Process Outsourcing
- Founded: 1965
- Defunct: 2012
- Successor: NTT DATA
- Headquarters: Boston, MA
- Area served: United States, Canada
- Key people: President and CEO John W. McCain; Employees = 12,500 in 12 countries
- Products: Application Services, Business Process Outsourcing, Infrastructure Services
- Website: www.keane.com

Keane was a Boston-based Information Technology services unit of NTT DATA, itself a subsidiary of the Japanese national phone company, NTT (Nippon Telegraph and Telephone) Group. It offered Application Services, as well as Infrastructure and Business Process Outsourcing solutions delivered through onsite, nearshore, and offshore resources.

It ranked 70 on the 2010 InformationWeek 500, a list of the top technology innovators in the U.S. Keane was recognized for advancing the practice of application management outsourcing (AMO) with its DynAMOSM solution, and was listed as an industry finalist for the Consulting & Business Services category.

== History ==
Keane Associates was founded on December 15, 1965 in Boston, Massachusetts by John F. Keane. The company's initial focus was in the healthcare technology sector. The company grew to over 100 employees within ten years. By the 1990s Keane had become a publicly traded company and expanded into software engineering, application maintenance, program management and consulting services.

September 11, 2001 - One of the company's locations was the South Tower in New York City that collapsed because of the 9/11 terror attacks.

October 20, 2003 - Keane acquired a majority (60%) interest in Worldzen, a global Business Process Outsourcing organization. The entity worked closely with their consulting arm, Keane Consulting Group.

February 7, 2007 - Caritor acquired Keane, Inc. The combined entity retained the name of Keane. The corporate headquarters was relocated to San Francisco, CA and then to Boston, MA.

On January 3, 2011, it was announced that Keane had become a wholly owned subsidiary of NTT DATA Corporation of Japan. and came to be known as Keane, an NTT Data Company The company was at the time of its acquisition by NTT, approximately half-owned by.

In 2012, all North American (and a lot of other global) entities of NTT were amalgamated under the NTT DATA name and reorganized based on their area of specialty. At this point, all legacy companies (Keane, Revere Group, Intelligroup, Vertex, MISI, and NTT DATA AgileNet) were operating as NTT DATA Americas.

== Subsidiaries ==
Keane Care, Inc (part of the Healthcare Solutions Division of Keane, Inc) provides clinical and financial software information systems to the long-term care industry.

Kamco (Keane Australia Micropayment Consortium) is providing the myki ticketing system for Victoria, Australia's Public Transport System. although the Myki roll-out has been suspended and is not available on V/Line Long Distance services.

Figtree Systems is a provider of Claims & Risk Management software.

== Kamco consortium ==
High level discussions between Keane CEO John McCain and the Government of Victoria were held in February 2010 about the Myki implementation, a project carried out by the Kamco consortium (comprising Ascom, ERG, Keane and Giesecke & Devrient Australasia) that was significantly delayed and over budget. During those discussions, Keane committed to dedicating additional resources and software experts to set the project back on track.

== Initiatives ==
Keane Foundation donated $1.67 million as funds for the establishment of the Institute for Global Work at the Boston University School of Management.

== See also ==
- Software industry in Telangana
