= Myki =

Public transport ticketing system in Victoria, Australia

- Physical Myki card
- Location: Victoria, Australia
- Launched: 2008
- Predecessor: Metcard
- Technology: MIFARE DESFire
- Operator: Conduent (current); NTT Data (previous)
- Manager: Transport Victoria
- Currency: AUD
- Stored-value: Myki money
- Credit expiry: 4 years, but balance is transferable with an option to extend
- Auto recharge: Auto top-up
- Unlimited use: Myki pass (for 7 days or between 28 and 365 days)
- Validity: Metropolitan trains; Metropolitan buses; Trams; Regional trains; Regional buses (Note: Myki valid for trips in Ballarat, Bendigo, Eaglehawk, Epsom, Geelong, Kangaroo Flat, Kilmore East, Moe, Morwell, Seymour, South Geelong, Traralgon, Wallan and Waurn Ponds)
- Retailed: Online; Telephone; Staffed railway stations and ticket machines; Regional trains; Retail outlets and newsagents
- Variants: Adult; Concession; Youth; Child
- Website: Official website

Myki (/ˈmaɪ.kiː/ MY-kee), stylised as myki, is a reloadable credit card-sized contactless smart card ticketing system used for electronic payment of fares on most public transport services in Melbourne and regional Victoria, Australia. Myki replaced the Metcard ticketing system and became fully operational at the end of 2012.

The system was developed by Kamco (Keane Australia Micropayment Consortium) and is used by Transport Victoria. The initial 10-year contract was worth approximately A$1.5 billion, described by The Age as "the [world's] biggest for a smartcard ticketing system". The Myki contract was extended in July 2016 for a further seven years.

The original Myki agreement with the Victorian government expired in November 2023. On 15 May 2023, the Victorian government announced it had signed a contract with Conduent, an American company, that will take over the Myki system for the next 15 years. The new system was reported to be rolled out by 2025. In May 2025, the planned upgrade was delayed by 9 months, starting in March 2026.

== History ==
=== Trial ===
Myki logo

Myki replaced the Metcard ticketing system in metropolitan Melbourne, and various ticketing systems used by buses in some major regional cities. Work on the new public transport ticketing system for Victoria commenced in late 2002. In June 2003, the Transport Ticketing Authority (TTA) was established to procure and manage the new system. On 12 July 2005, the Kamco consortium was awarded the $494 million contract to develop the system, with the completion date being 2007. The consortium was made up of Keane Inc, Ascom, ERG, and Giesecke & Devrient Australasia.

A pilot program was due to begin in early 2007, but was delayed by approximately a year. In February 2008, Public Transport Minister, Lynne Kosky, announced that the full roll-out of the system would not begin until the end of the year. By March the same year, the minister said that the system would not be operational until 2010. In April 2008, the TTA announced that it had stopped making service payments to the Kamco consortium after April 2007, because the project had not been delivered on schedule.

The first field trial of the new Myki system was held on the Geelong bus network in late 2007, which identified problems. In August 2008 testing began on the Melbourne suburban train and tram networks.

=== Melbourne rollout ===
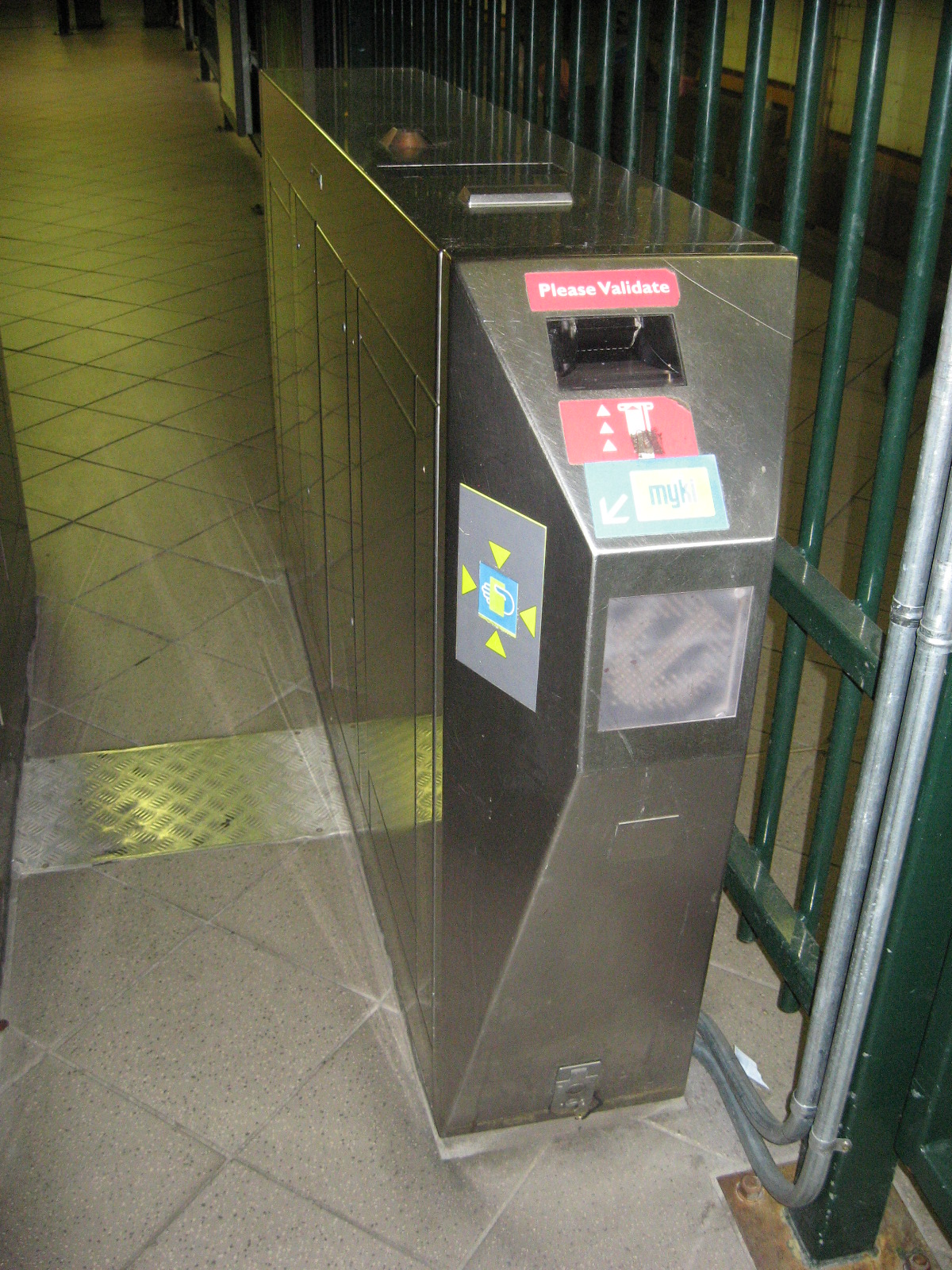
A Metcard gate at Flinders Street station that had been modified to accept Myki

The Melbourne roll-out began in July 2007 with the installation of Myki readers. Myki became valid for travel on all metropolitan train services, but not trams and buses, from 29 December 2009, though the system of purchasing cards was still cumbersome. On 25 July 2010, Myki coverage was extended to Melbourne metropolitan bus and tram services.

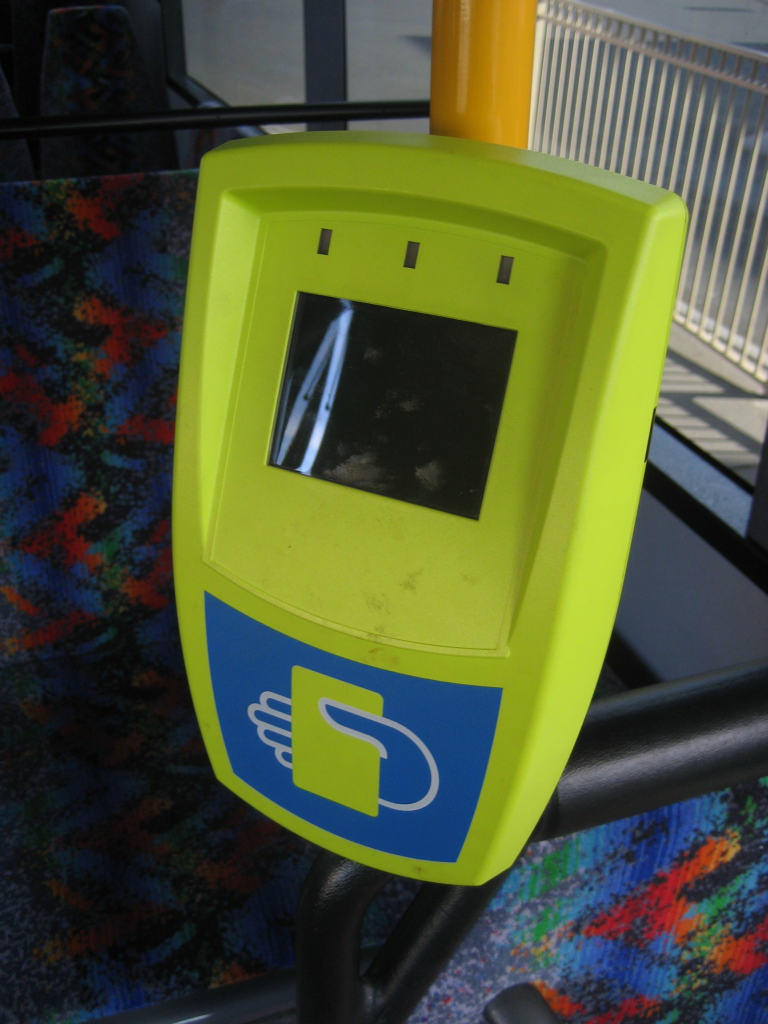
A first generation myki reader on a bus

During 2012, the government progressively shut down the Metcard system:

- from the start of 2012, yearly Metcards became unavailable
- from 26 March 2012, monthly and weekly Metcards became unavailable
- from 30 June 2012, "value" Metcards, such as 10x2 hour, 10xEarly Bird, 5xDaily, 5xWeekend Daily, 5xSeniors Daily, 10xCity Saver, Sunday Saver and Off-Peak Daily became unavailable. Only single-use 2-hour, Daily, City Saver and Seniors Daily Metcards continued to be available.

All Metcard ticket vending machines on railway stations were removed or switched off. The only Metcard vending machines still in operation were on trams. The limited remaining range of Metcards could only be purchased from staff at premium stations, from bus drivers, or from a PTV Hub. The sale of Metcards at Premium (staffed) Metro railway stations was progressively phased out, and ceased entirely during October. The removal of Metcard validators from railway stations started on 12 November 2012. Also from November, passengers with unused Metcards were able to transfer the value onto a Myki card as Myki money at premium Metro railway stations.

On 29 December 2012, Metcard was switched off, and Myki became the only form of ticket valid on Melbourne public transport. On the same day, all Metcard equipment remaining on the system became inoperative.

It was intended that the Skybus Melbourne Airport shuttle bus service (with its own, premium fares) would also accept Myki once the system was fully operational, but this did not happen.

=== Regional rollout (partial) ===
Original Myki retail signage

On 12 December 2008, Myki went on sale to the general public on four bus routes in Geelong, and on 2 March 2009 all bus routes in the Geelong and Bellarine Peninsula area were completely switched to Myki. In April 2009, all bus services in Ballarat, Bendigo and Seymour were converted to Myki. In May 2009, all bus services in the Latrobe Valley towns of Moe, Morwell, Traralgon and Warragul were operating with Myki equipment, making it the last regional bus system to be converted. Myki came into use on regional "commuter" (short-haul) rail services in July 2013, in a staged process: between Melbourne and Seymour on 24 June, on the Traralgon line on 8 July, the Bendigo line on 17 July, the Ballarat line on 24 July, and the Geelong-Marshall line on 29 July. On 10 November 2013, Myki was introduced on Wallan and Kilmore town buses.

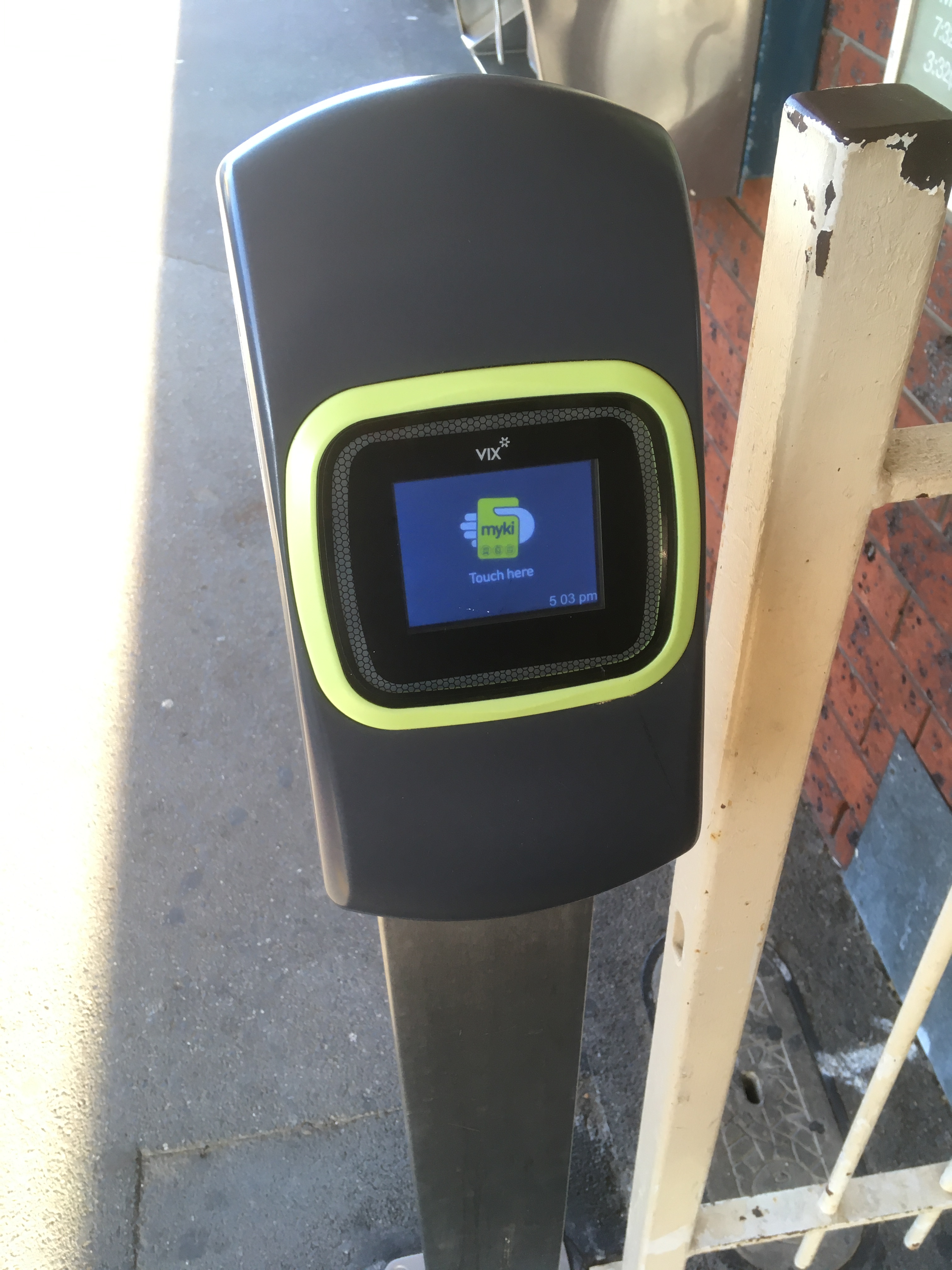
A second generation myki reader at a train station

On 25 February 2014, paper tickets for passengers on V/Line commuter services were abolished, and passengers were required to use Myki. Paper tickets remained for travel outside the Myki zone. Passengers with Myki Pass who want to travel beyond the Myki area could purchase paper "extension tickets" to cover the rest of their journey.

=== Mobile Myki rollout ===
Mobile Myki, launched on 28 March 2019, allowed NFC-enabled Android devicesto be used in place of a physical myki card, with users able to top up and manage their balance through the Google Pay (later Google Wallet) app and touch on and off at myki readers without needing to open the app.

=== COVID-19 pandemic ===
The COVID-19 pandemic resulted in significant changes to public transport in Victoria during periods of lockdown. Decreased patronage and public health concerns resulted in some changes being made to myki.

On 10 July 2021, the facility to top up on buses was halted and has continued even after the pandemic.

Several temporary changes to fares were also introduced. A 30% discount for off-peak travel ran from 31 January to 24 August 2021 (defined as trips made between 9:30am and 4pm or after 7pm on weekdays). The stated aim was to decrease overcrowding on public transport vehicles by encouraging people to travel during less busy times of the day wherever possible. Vouchers were released for one day of free public transport travel to encourage more people to visit the central city area. In December 2021, 250,000 vouchers were offered for use. The facility to 'pause' or receive a refund of myki passes previously purchased was made available for periods of lockdown where most travel was banned.

=== Change of operator ===
In May 2023, the Public Transport Minister Ben Carroll announced that Conduent, a US ticketing company will take over from NTT Data and operate the Myki ticketing system for 15 years with a A$1.7 billion contract. The changeover will occur on 1 December 2023. In the 18-month tender process, Conduent was chosen as the preferred operator over NTT Data and Cubic due to the calls to have a change and Cubic's preference of installing their own ticketing machines, rather than utilising the current Vix Technology card readers and other infrastructure.

Several new features will be introduced as mandated in the contract, including enabling payment via credit card and debit card cards, moving the card-based ticketing system to an account-based system and expanding myki to the regional areas that are currently paper-ticketed. Trials with credit and debit cards were conducted from November 2024 on buses in Wangaratta, prior to the roll out of new readers from May 2025 onwards.

=== Contactless payments rollout ===
Full fare contactless payments with a credit or debit card rolled out as part of a trial on the Craigieburn and Upfield metropolitan services and the Ballarat and Seymour V/Line services on 16 March 2026. The trial was suspended following the introduction of free public transport across April and May 2026, a temporary measure by the Victorian Government in response to cost of living pressures caused by the 2026 Iran war fuel crisis. The trial resumed on 1 June 2026.

Contactless payments were extended to the Cranbourne, Pakenham, Sunbury, Frankston, Stony Point, Sandringham, Werribee, Williamstown and Flemington Racecourse metropolitan services and the Bendigo, Geelong and Traralgon V/Line services on 7 June 2026. The Alamein, Belgrave, Glen Waverley, Lilydale, Hurstbridge and Mernda services followed on 14 June . Contactless payments were extended to the tram network on 21 June and the myki bus network on 26 July. Concessions were able to be linked to a contactless payment method on 13 October.

=== Regional rollout (long distance) ===
Myki and contactless payments started being rolled out to the long-distance V/Line train network in August and September 2026. The Echuca line was the first line to receive the rollout on 16 August, followed by the Swan Hill line on 23 August, the Shepparton line on 30 August, the Ararat and Maryborough lines on 6 September, the Warrnambool line on 13 September, the Bairnsdale line on 20 September, and finally the Albury line except Benalla and Euroa, on 27 September. Due to Inland Rail station upgrades, Benalla and Euroa will be added on 22 November.

== Payment types ==
=== Myki ===
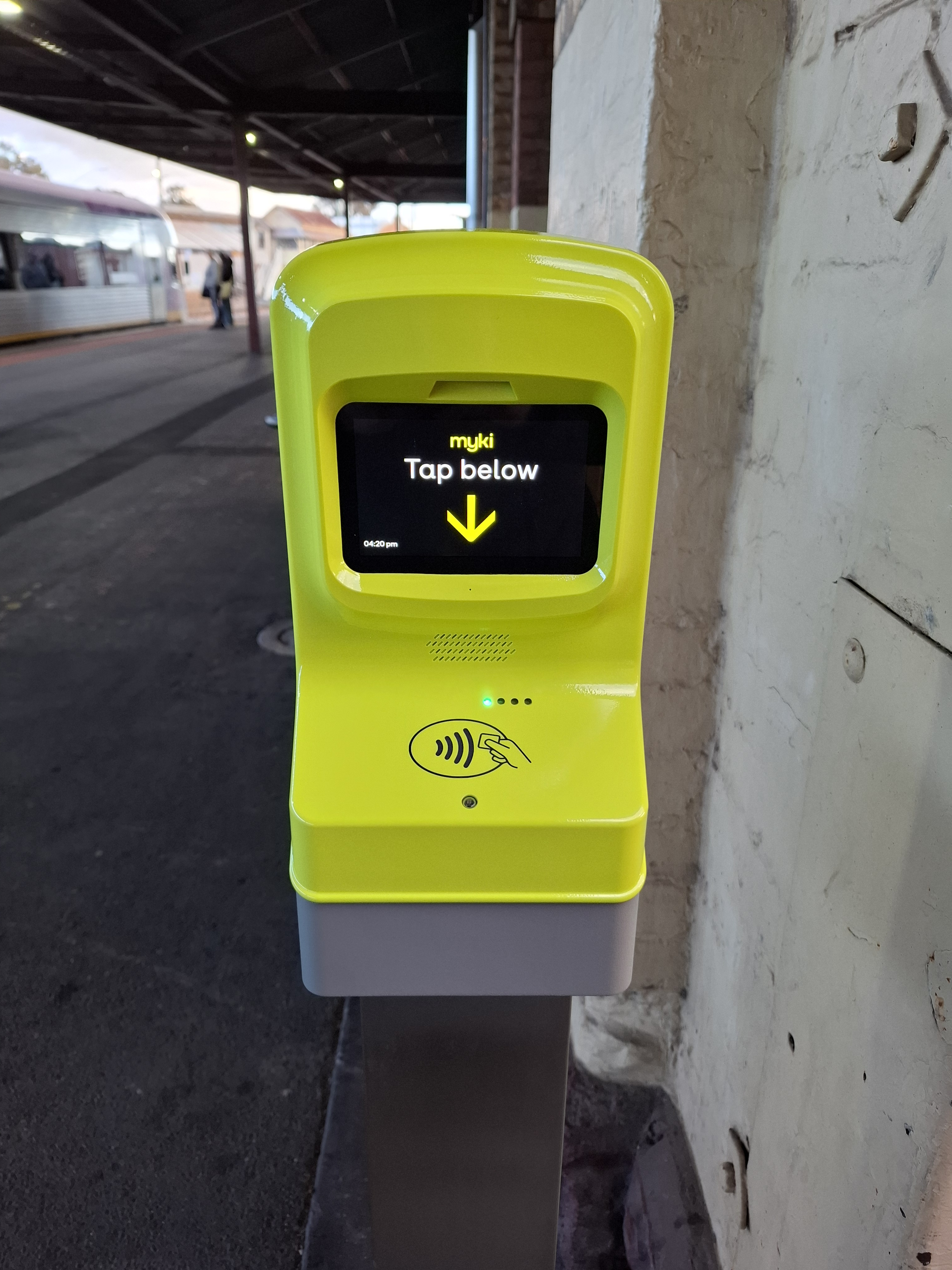
A third generation myki reader at a train station

First generation Myki card design

A Myki card can be purchased at ticket offices at railway stations, ticket machines at railway stations and major bus and tram interchanges (adult card only), the Transport Victoria Hub at Southern Cross railway station, retailers displaying the Myki sign (including most 7-Eleven outlets) and online. The card cannot be purchased onboard trains, trams or buses. The adult card costs $6, the concession card costs $3, and the youth card costs $5.

After acquiring a Myki card, the passenger needs to add value onto the card, in a process called "topping up". The value stored on the card is called "Myki money". Top up is available at the same places as card purchase, or "auto top up" can be set up to recharge the card from a linked credit card or bank account automatically when the Myki money balance falls to a set threshold. Top up is also available using the PTV app with NFC.

Myki cards were originally issued with a green front, featuring different designs showing a selection of playful symbols on the front, and with different city-related photographs on the back depending on the type of card. After a redesign in late 2014, the cards now have a predominantly grey/black design on the front, meaning it is no longer possible to visually distinguish between full fare and concession cards.

In May 2025, premier Jacinta Allan announced that a youth Myki card would be introduced as of 1 January 2026, providing free travel on Victorian public transport to people aged under 18 years. The scheme is expected to replace the student pass for school students, which, as of 2025, cost $755 for a yearly pass. The ABC reported that over a period of four years, the scheme would cost the Victorian government $318 million.

=== Mobile Myki ===
Mobile Myki is a virtual Myki card stored on a smartphone. The virtual card is available in Google Wallet on Android devices, but not available in Apple Wallet on Apple devices. The virtual card works the same way as the physical card; the smartphone is held to a Myki reader to touch on or off. Virtual cards can be registered using the same process as physical cards; they are not automatically linked to the user.

=== Contactless payments ===
Contactless payments were rolled out throughout 2026.

This enables passengers to pay for their journey using a contactless credit or debit card (MasterCard or Visa), including those stored in a smartphone or smartwatch. Concession fare can be obtained by registering it.

== Fares ==
Metropolian myki money fares effective 1 June 2026
Fare type	Two hour		Weekday Daily		Weekend / public holiday Daily	
Fare type	Full-fare	Concession	Full-fare	Concession	Full-fare	Concession
Zone 1+2	$2.85	$1.42	$5.70	$2.85	$4.00	$2.00
Zone 2 only	$1.80	$0.90	$3.60	$1.80	—N/a	—N/a

Metropolitan Melbourne is divided into two zones (Zones 1 and 2). Beyond metropolitan Melbourne there are a further twenty seven zones (Zones 3–29). There are areas of overlap between some zones (notably Zones 1 and 2) where locations exist within both zones.

The system calculates the cheapest fare for a passenger based on the times and zones travelled. Fares are assessed on the basis of a two-hour fare or a daily fare, which is twice the price of a two-hour fare. The two-hour fare provides unlimited travel within a two hour period from the first touch on, but if the first touch on is after 6pm, the two-hour fare provides unlimited travel until 3am the next day. The daily fare provides unlimited travel until 3am the next day. Myki provides free travel for seniors, carers, and disability support pensioner card holders on weekends, but not public holidays.

Myki passes, valid for 7 days or 28–325 days, can be loaded onto a card and provide unlimited travel within a nominated zone or zones for the relevant period. If a 325 day pass is purchased, the days above 325 are free of charge up to 365 days.

Following a 2022 Victorian state election promise, a daily fare cap was introduced where the fare cap applied for any journey in Victoria would be the same as a Zone 1+2 daily fare. This change was made to encourage public transport use and reduce the burden for people living in regional Victoria, as well as boosting regional tourism. However, there are criticisms due to the lower frequency of services in regional Victoria, where it was unknown whether the demand would be too big for the current system to handle and the unwillingness of the government to increase the service frequency.

Ticketing requirements for trains, trams and buses in Melbourne are mainly contained in the Transport (Compliance and Miscellaneous) (Ticketing) Regulations 2017 and the Victorian Fares and Ticketing Manual.

== Operation ==
=== Card availability ===
A Myki card can be used for travel on:

- Melbourne metropolitan train, tram and bus services including SmartBus, but not Skybus services (Metro, Transport Victoria buses, Yarra Trams, etc)
- V/Line trains.
- Regional buses in major towns within the commuter belt (e.g., Ballarat, Bendigo, Geelong and the Latrobe Valley).

=== Card use ===
To use Myki when travelling, a passenger holds the card against a reader (called "touching on" or "touching off"). Passengers touch on at the start of a trip and (except for a tram trip within Zone 1) touch off at the end of the trip, at which point the appropriate fare is assessed and deducted from the stored Myki money value on the card. If the fare for a trip is greater than the stored Myki money balance remaining, the card will show a negative Myki money balance, in which case it cannot be touched on again until it has been topped up to reach a positive amount of money. Passengers do not need to touch on or off for tram trips entirely within the city's "Free Tram Zone", which covers roughly the CBD.

=== Card registration ===
Myki cards and Mobile Myki can be "registered" with Transport Victoria, enabling cardholders to view their travel history and card expiry date, initiate "auto top up" functionality, or replace lost cards.

=== Card expiry ===
A Myki card has a limited validity period, but the expiry date is not printed on the card. A physical card expires four years after the date on which it is purchased. Mobile Myki expires after two years. If the card is registered, the holder can see online the date on which the card expires. Transport Victoria also contacts the registered card holder shortly before the expiry date to remind them of the card's imminent expiry. Holders of anonymous cards must use a card vending machine or Myki Check machine to find out when their card will expire.

A Myki card that has expired within the past 90 days or is expiring in the next 90 days can be extended for an additional two years from the original expiry date by scanning the Myki card at a Myki machine, using the PTV App, at a staffed train station, at a myki retailer or at a PTV hub.

A Myki card that has expired or is expiring in the next 60 days can also be replaced for free at staffed metropolitan railway stations, Myki-enabled V/Line stations or a Transport Victoria Hub, with any balance from the expired/expiring card being transferred to the new card instantly. Alternatively, users can post their expired/expiring Myki card to Transport Victoria and wait up to 10 working days for a new card to be posted to them. If the expired/expiring card was registered, the replacement card will be automatically registered. Auto top-up will not be transferred to the new Myki and, if desired, needs to be set up again. Users can also request a replacement on the Transport Victoria website or through the call centre.

== Infrastructure ==
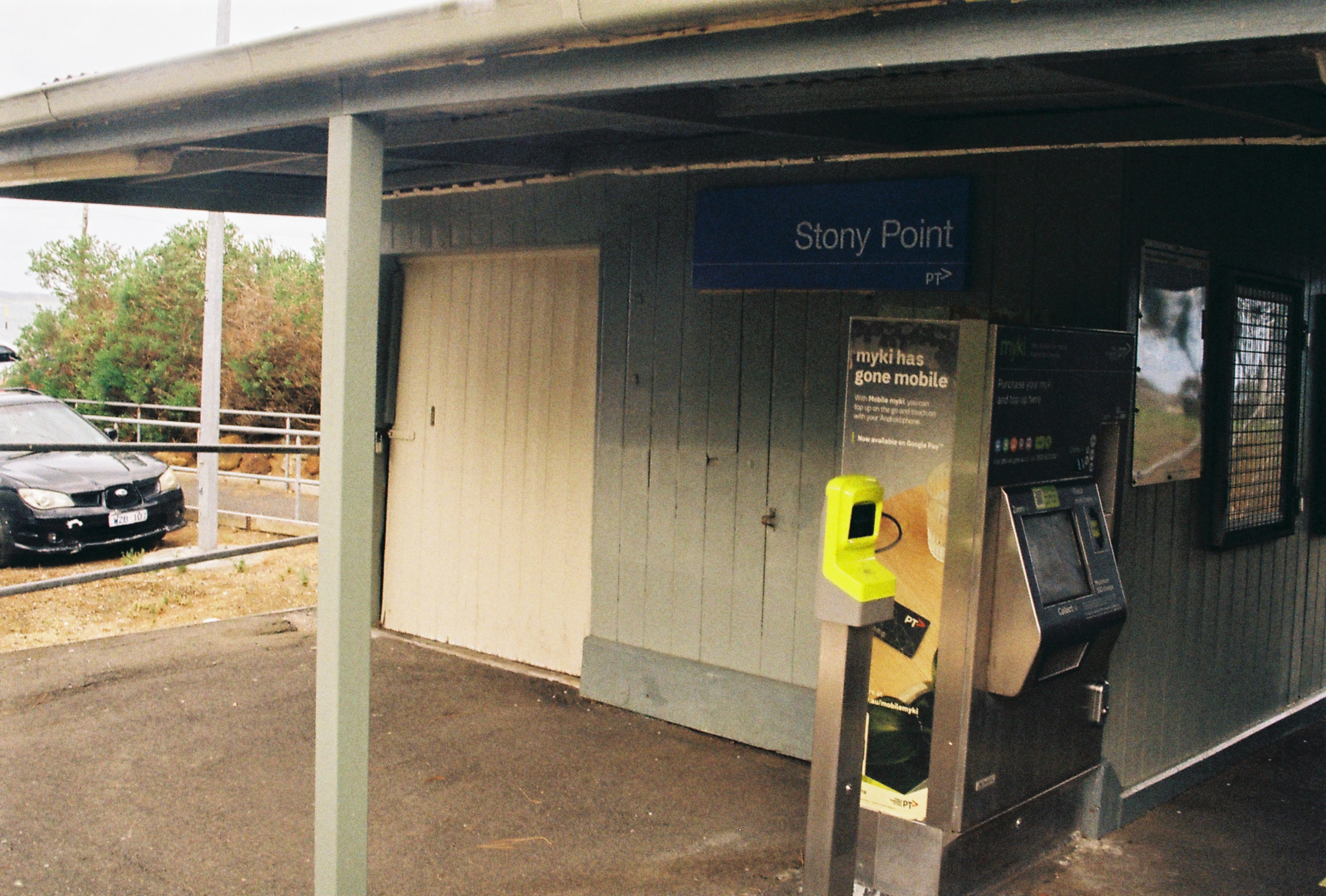
Myki vending machine and ticket reader next to each other at a train station

=== Myki machines ===
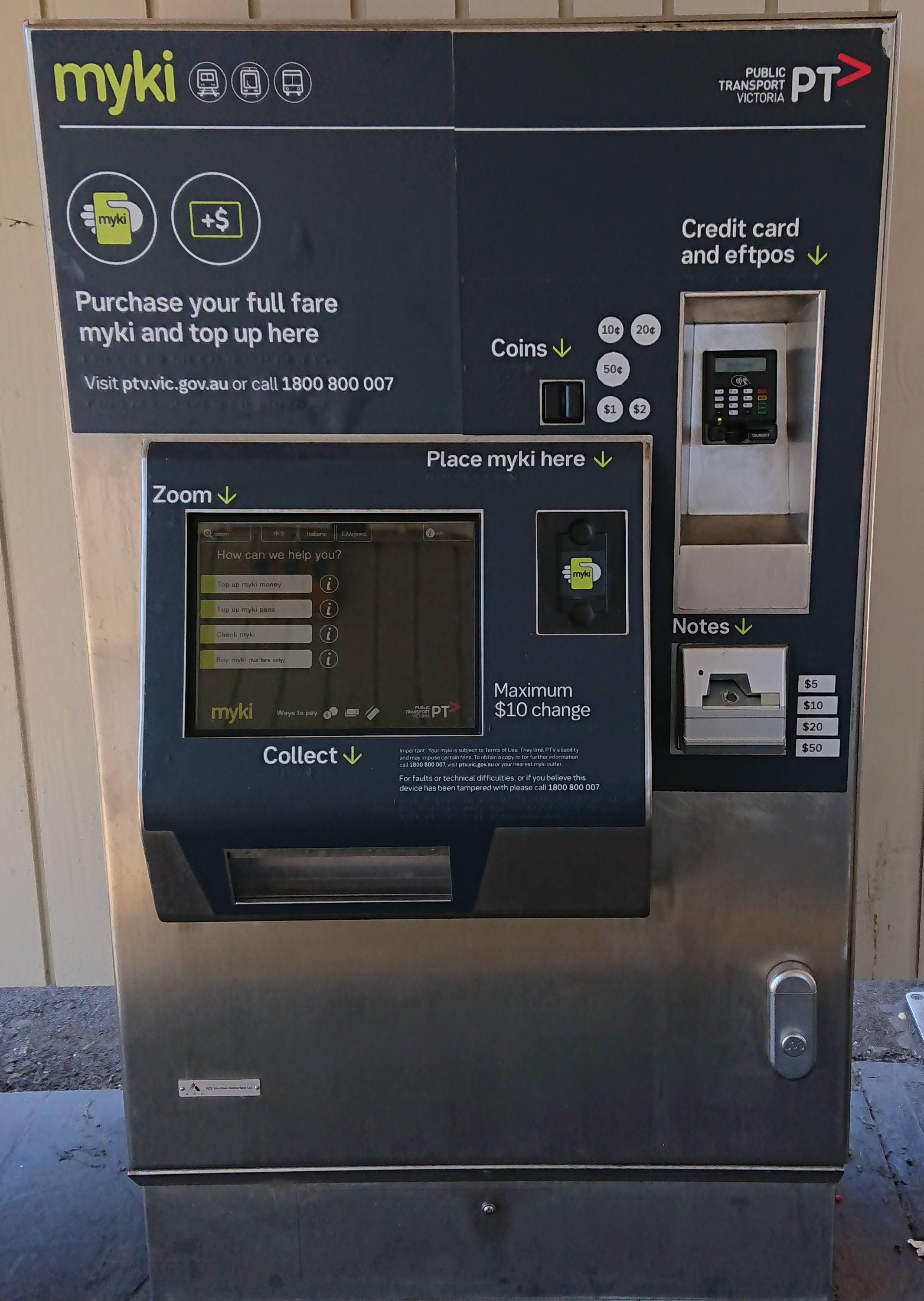
A Myki vending machine at Burnley railway station

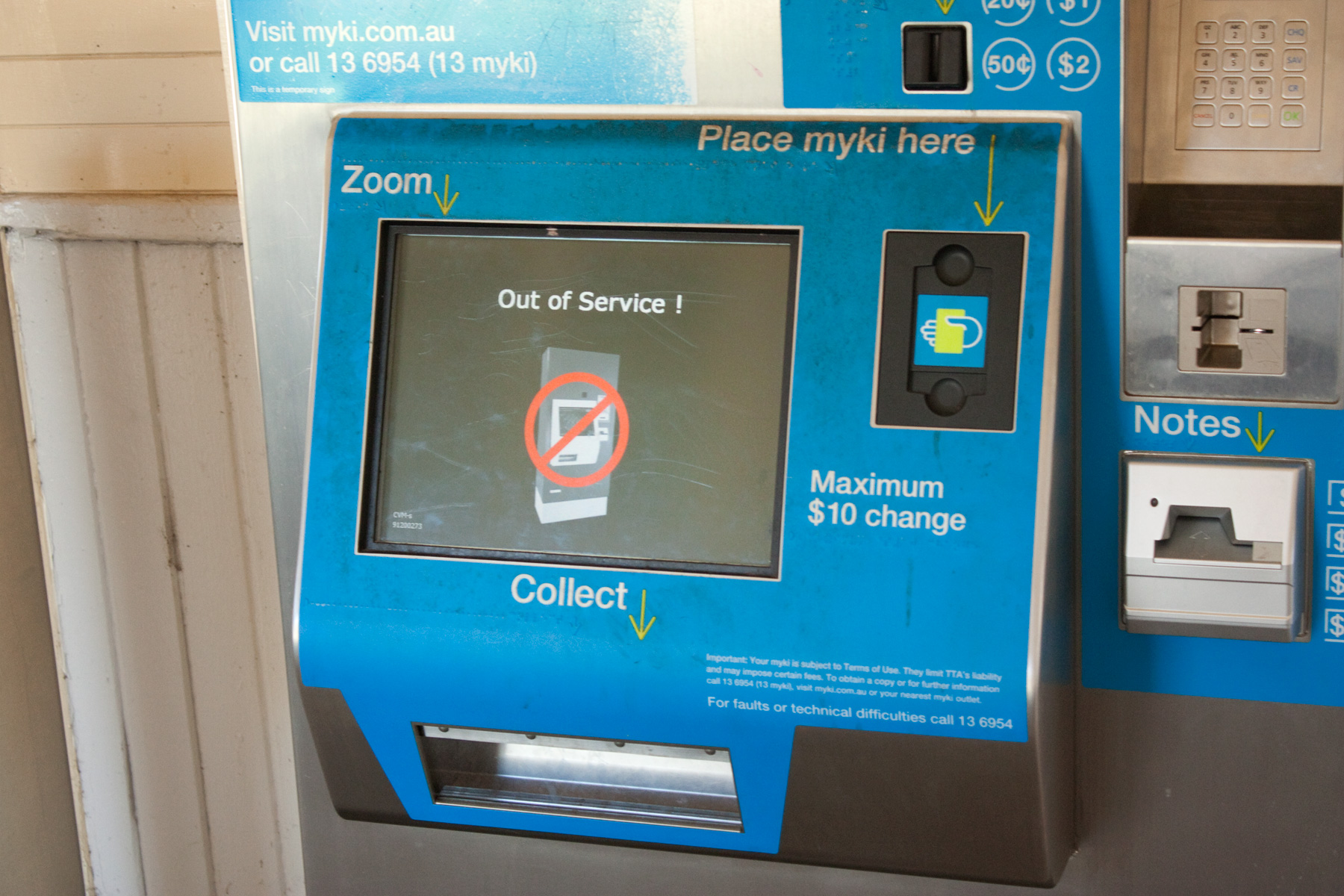
An out of service Myki machine

Myki machines are used to purchase a new card and top up an existing card.

=== Myki readers ===
Myki readers are used to touch on and touch off each mode of public transport. There have been three generation of readers: the original Kamco Readers, the Vix readers, and the Condulent readers.

== Reception ==
According to Transport Victoria, in 2019:

- More than 12.8 million myki smart cards were in circulation.
- More than one million passengers touched on with a myki.
- More than 104,500 passengers were mobile myki users.

== Criticism ==
The Myki ticketing system has been criticised on a number of grounds:

- Necessity: Critics, such as the Public Transport Users Association, questioned why a new ticketing system was needed when Melbourne already had an adequate one. The Metcard validating equipment already had built-in support for a contactless ticket (the yellow circles on the front of the former Metcard validators, as well as on Ticket Vending Machines.
- Its total cost of $1.5 billion.
- Extended delivery timeframe. The project began in May 2005 with a scheduled delivery date of March 2007. Full delivery eventually took until 2013.
- Lack of a short-term ticket: The decision not to proceed with the planned introduction of short-term tickets in Melbourne, and to abolish them on regional town bus services, meant that Myki is now one of the world's few ticketing systems on which visitors and occasional users cannot buy a short-term ticket. A total of 50 million short-term tickets, costing $15 million, were pulped.
- The lack of ticket sales or top up facilities on board trams, a facility which was available under previous ticketing systems. As a result, tram passengers must have bought and topped up a myki before they board the vehicle. Options to do this through the retail network are limited, particularly in the outer suburbs and after hours where Myki retailers (except 7-Eleven) have closed while trams can still be running.
- Privacy: In 2010 the Opposition expressed concern over the data collection and sharing used by Myki, claiming that the Government was breaching its own Information Privacy Act.
- Controversies over the tendering process. A staff member of the TTA left a USB flash drive in a room with representatives of one of the bidders. The TTA said this was an accident and that there was no confidential information on the flash drive. Also, the company hired by the TTA early in the process to give it technical advice was part of the winning consortium.
- Increased dwell times: Tests commissioned by the Government in 2007 suggested longer stationary times for trams compared to the Metcard system as a result of passengers needing to touch on and off when boarding and disembarking. As a result, when Myki was made available on trams in 2009 the requirement to touch off was removed.
- Potential for a higher fare to be charged if a user forgets to touch off: The cost of a trip after which the user has not touched off (deliberately or accidentally) may be higher than the fare the passenger would have paid if they had touched off. This was mostly alleviated by fare cap adjustments.
- Ticket vending machines receipt issuing: Topping up a Myki using EFTPOS or credit card displays a screen asking the user if they would like a receipt to be printed. If "no" was selected, an EFT transaction record was printed anyway, which contained the credit card user's full name, expiry date and 9 of 16 credit card digits. This was subsequently changed to show only the last four digits of the credit card with the card holder's name no longer printed, and eventually to prevent the printing of receipts when "no" had been selected.
- Newsagents initially refused to sell Myki cards because lower commissions were being offered by the government in comparison to Metcard.
- Disability Access: Disability groups claimed that several elements of the Myki program would be problematic for users with a disability (particularly people in wheelchairs, or those with cognitive limitations or who lack dexterity) due to the placement of several pieces of equipment. On low-floor trams, Myki readers have been installed at various heights to cater for this. The Government introduced a free Access Travel Pass for users who are unable to use Myki ticketing equipment as a result of a permanent disability.
- On 29 December 2009, the reputation of Lynne Kosky, the Public Transport Minister at the time, was put into question when Kosky was unable to recall the phone number for commuters to buy a ticket, and a computer error resulted in over 1,600 people receiving new Myki cards with their name incorrectly spelled or printed as 'anonymous'.
- Rules covering faulty cards: The TTA originally stated that passengers who had a faulty Myki card would need to buy a replacement Myki card if they wanted to travel and seek reimbursement later. This replicated the rule for faulty Metcards. Users are now able to go to a staffed railway station to have a faulty Myki replaced on the spot.
- Auto top-up failure problem: Originally, when the auto top-up feature of Myki failed due to insufficient funds, the card was blocked and had to be posted to Myki to be reactivated. Now the auto top-up request is removed from the card, and the original top up amount is reversed from the Myki.
- On 11 June 2015, a Melbourne commuter found her card showed a negative balance of $2,684,350.00.
- Vandalism: Particularly in the early days of myki, there were widespread reports of damage to Myki equipment, with up to 60% of machines being targeted by vandals. Display screens on fare payment devices and card vending machines could be smashed by heavy objects, rendering the displays unusable, or by marker pen, paint or scratching obscuring information. In mid-2013 it was reported that Myki machines at some railway stations had been broken into using portable power tools, in order to raid their cash boxes. While Myki readers will often still work despite surface vandalism, passengers might not be able to read the information displayed on the reader's screen.

== See also ==
- Opal – Sydney's public transport ticketing system
- go card – Brisbane's public transport ticketing system
- SmartRider – Perth's public transport ticketing system
- metroCARD – Adelaide's public transport ticketing system
- MyWay+ – Canberra's public transport ticketing system
