= USS John S. McCain =

Two ships of the United States Navy have been named USS John S. McCain, in honor of John S. McCain Sr., John S. McCain Jr., and John S. McCain III (commonly just John McCain).

- USS John S. McCain (DL-3) was a Mitscher-class guided-missile destroyer leader, later re-designated as the destroyer DDG-36, commissioned in 1953 and decommissioned in 1978.
- USS John S. McCain (DDG-56) is an Arleigh Burke-class guided-missile destroyer commissioned in 1994 and currently on active service.
