= Expo 2020 =

World Expo in Dubai, United Arab Emirates

2021–2022 Dubai

Overview
- BIE-class: Universal exposition
- Category: International Registered Exhibition
- Name: EXPO 2020 إكسبو
- Motto: Connecting Minds, Creating the Future
- Area: 438 ha (1,080 acres)
- Visitors: 25,000,000
- Organized by: Reem Al Hashimi (managing director)
- Mascot: Salama, Rashid, Latifa, Alif, Opti, and Terra

Participant(s)
- Countries: 193
- Organizations: 10

Location
- Country: United Arab Emirates
- City: Dubai
- Venue: Dubai Exhibition Centre, Dubai, United Arab Emirates
- Coordinates: 24°57′39″N 55°09′03″E

Timeline
- Awarded: 27 November 2013
- Opening: 1 October 2021
- Closure: 31 March 2022

Universal expositions
- Previous: Expo 2015 in Milan
- Next: Expo 2025 in Osaka

Specialized expositions
- Previous: Expo 2017 in Astana
- Next: Expo 2027 in Belgrade

Horticultural expositions
- Previous: Expo 2019 in Beijing
- Next: Expo 2022 in Almere

Internet
- Website: expo2020dubai.com

Expo 2020 (Arabic: إكسبو 2020) was a World Expo hosted in Dubai, United Arab Emirates, from 1 October 2021 to 31 March 2022.

Originally scheduled for 20 October 2020 to 10 April 2021, it was postponed due to the COVID-19 pandemic in the United Arab Emirates. Despite being postponed, organizers kept the name Expo 2020 for marketing and branding purposes. The event had recorded more than 24 million visits from around the world in its six months.

The Bureau International des Expositions (BIE) general assembly in Paris named Dubai as the host on 27 November 2013. Expo 2020 Dubai are expected to come up with Dh154.9 billion ($42.2 billion) of gross value added (GVA) to the UAE’s economy from 2013 to 2042, as per the EY report.

== Site ==
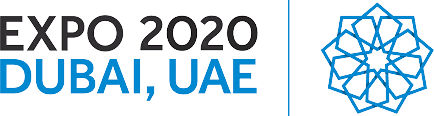
Old logo of Expo 2020 Dubai

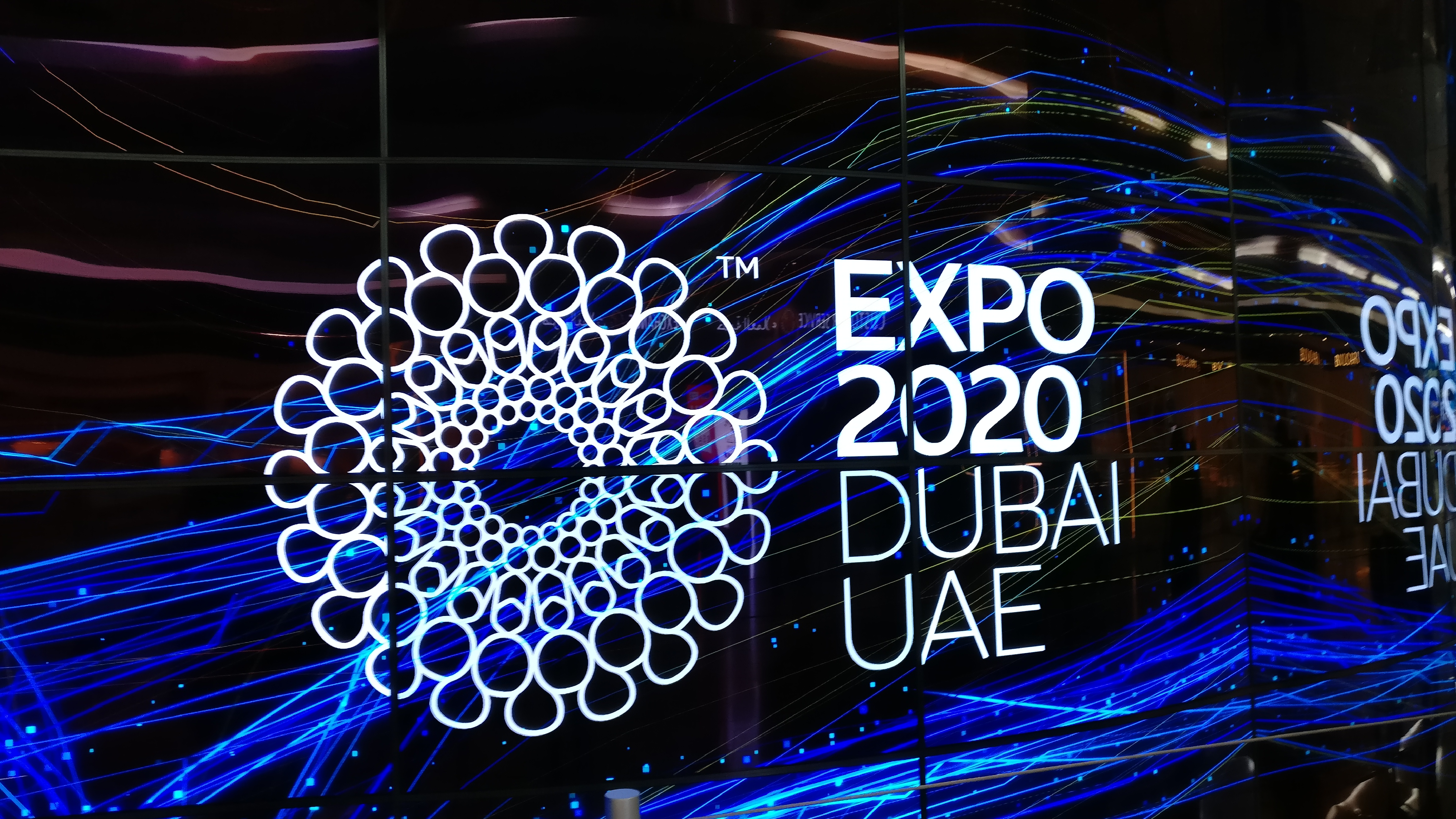
Expo 2020 logo at Dubai International Airport

The main site of Expo 2020 Dubai was a 438-hectare area (1083 acres) located between the cities of Dubai and Abu Dhabi, near Dubai's southern border with Abu Dhabi. The master plan, designed by the American firm HOK, was organized around a central plaza, entitled Al Wasl Plaza, enclosed by three large thematic districts dedicated to the themes of Expo 2020 – Opportunity, Mobility and Sustainability.

The infrastructure of the 4.38 km^{2} Expo 2020 site was built by Orascom and BESIX. The site had an emergency centre which includes an isolation room, emergency care room, ambulances and helicopter services.

The site also featured the ROVE Expo 2020, which was the only hotel located at the site. The hotel featured 312 rooms and 19 suites with a rooftop pool and views of Al Wasl Plaza.

== Opening ceremony ==
Expo 2020 officially opened on 30 September 2021. The ceremony featured performances by Emirati singer Ahlam ("Fi Dubai") She performed the song in three different languages (Arabic, English and French); Italian tenor Andrea Bocelli ("The Prayer"); Emirati singer-composer Hussain Al Jassmi, Mayssa Karaa and Almas singing the Expo's theme song, "This Is Our Time"; British singer Ellie Goulding ("Anything Could Happen"); Beninese singer Angélique Kidjo and Saudi singer Mohammed Abdu (a duet of John Legend's "If You're Out There"); American singer Andra Day ("Rise Up"); and Chinese pianist Lang Lang, among others. The opening declaration was made by the ruler of Dubai Sheikh Mohammed bin Rashid Al Maktoum.

== Closing ceremony ==
Expo 2020 officially closed on 31 March 2022. American artists Christina Aguilera, Yo-Yo Ma and Norah Jones, Filipino bands Rivermaya, Moonstar88 and Imago, and the Dutch DJ Tiësto were among those who performed on the final night of the exposition. The top officials of Expo 2025 host Osaka, Governor Hirofumi Yoshimura and Mayor Ichiro Matsui, attended at the end the Expo 2020 Dubai to promote the Osaka event internationally. There were also concerts from the Expo 2020 World String Ensemble and Italian pianist Eleonora Constantini who was the person behind the Flying Piano show at Expo 2020.

=== Anthems ===
- UAE-based children's choir, the all-women Firdaus Orchestra, conducted by Yasmina Sabbah – National Anthem of the United Arab Emirates.
- TBC – BIE Anthem
- NHK Symphony Orchestra conducted by Tadaaki Otaka – National Anthem of Japan

After the closing ceremony, in the early hours of 1 April, the 3 huge portals that served as the entrances to Expo 2020, were permanently closed by the Expo 2020 team.

== Transportation ==
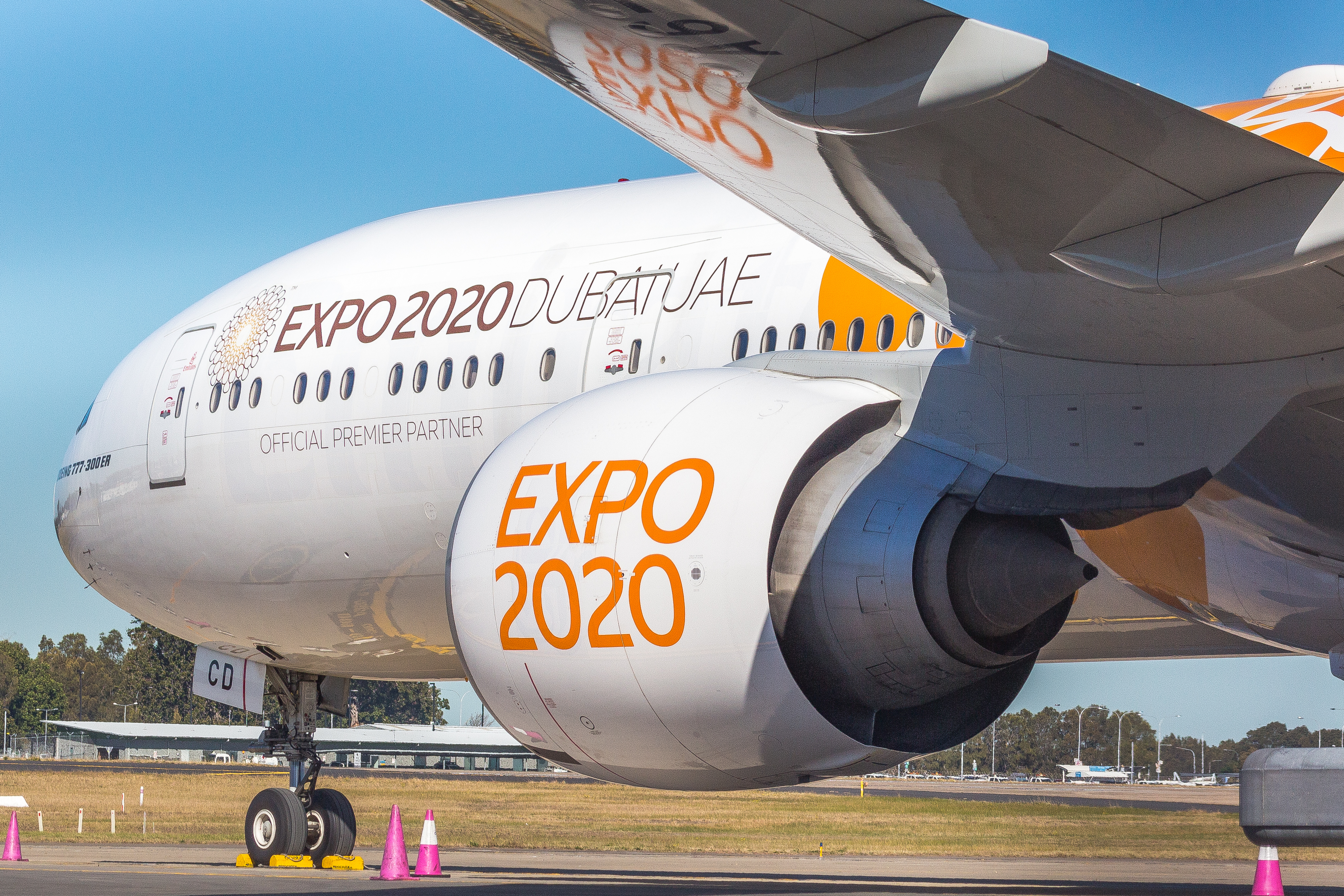
An Emirates Boeing 777-300ER painted in the Expo 2020 orange livery.

The Expo 2020 metro station connects the site to other localities in Dubai, along the Dubai Metro's Red Line directly to the entrance of the Dubai Exhibition Centre and Al Wasl Gate. Alternatively, Dedicated shuttle buses known as Expo Riders ferry people from all over Dubai to the Expo site and back. Shuttle buses and taxis from RTA also travel to the Expo site. The metro, taxi and buses are paid for with the RTA's Nol card while the Expo Rider buses are free. The Expo Rider buses stop at the arrival plazas of the three thematic districts in front of the three huge gates and a separate branch of Expo Rider buses transports people from the arrival plazas to the parking areas. Getting there by road is another option. People drive on the roads leading to the site and have to follow the signs to the designated parking areas.

== Themes ==
The slogan of the Expo was "Connecting Minds, Creating the Future". It had three themes: Opportunity, mobility and sustainability, each with its own pavilion. Mission Possible – The Opportunity Pavilion is designed by AGi Architects, Alif – The Mobility Pavilion by Foster and Partners, and Terra – The Sustainability Pavilion by Grimshaw Architects.

In 2021, it was announced that the three thematic pavilions would open for a limited time before the full opening of the expo. The Sustainability Pavilion Terra opened on 22 January 2021 until 10 April 2021.

The Programme for People and Planet (PPP) was also held as part of the Expo. The programme was organised around five key tracks – Build Bridges (cultural focus), Leave No One Behind (social development focus), Live in Balance (sustainability focus), Thrive Together (economic focus), and UAE Vision 2071. The Vision 2071 track focused on the UAE's long-term plans for its future.

=== Sustainability ===
In addition to Terra – The Sustainability Pavilion in the sustainability district, there was a Hammour House which explores coral reefs; a district stage that seats 300, and several national pavilions: Brazil's Walk through a waterfall, the Czech Republic's Water the desert, Singapore's Enter a rainforest, Germany's Wear cutting-edge devices, the UAE's Terra – The Sustainability Pavilion, and the Netherlands' Enter a miniature world pavilion.

=== Mobility ===
Alif – The Mobility Pavilion included the world's largest passenger lift (capable of transporting more than 160 people).

=== Opportunity ===
Mission Possible – The Opportunity Pavilion was designed by AGi Architects.

== Pavilions ==
The following nations and organizations participated in Expo 2020:

=== Country pavilions ===
Name	Sub theme	Size	Architect	Notes
Republic of China	Liquidity			
Afghanistan	Opportunity		Redpeg	The pavilion was organized by the Islamic Republic of Afghanistan and was not open to visitors in the first week due to the Taliban taking over the country. The pavilion opened later on 6 October and displays Afghan carpets, precious stones and other artifacts.
Albania	Mobility			
Algeria	Mobility		Pico	
Andorra	Sustainability			
Angola	Mobility		Nascimento, Toso, Acuto	
Antigua and Barbuda	Mobility			
Argentina	Opportunity			
Armenia	Opportunity			The pavilion features ancient books such as Urbatagirk, the Book of Lamentations and an arithmetic book by Anania Shirakatsi.
Australia	Mobility		bureau^proberts	The pavilion consists of three sections: Welcome Stories, a neon-lit corridor with visual installations of migrants describing their arrival in Australia; the Star Dreaming Gallery, a planetarium illustrating how Australia's indigenous communities were among the world's first astronomers; and Annika's Journey, a multimedia exhibition following a young girl as she explores Australia's efforts to build a sustainable future. The pavilion's mascots are Wattle the koala and Jali the butterfly.
Austria	Opportunity		Querkraft	Inspired by Arab wind towers, the pavilion consists of 38 white cones of different heights, which cause air to constantly move to provide natural ventilation. It is themed to the five senses.
Azerbaijan	Sustainability	1,300 m^{2} (14,000 sq ft) of gardens and walkways		It has a theme of Seeds for the Future, and was designed by Simmetrico.
Bahamas	Sustainability	696.77 m^{2} (7,500.0 sq ft)		
Bahrain	Opportunity		Christian Kerez	The Bahrain pavilion features live weaving stations.
Bangladesh	Sustainability		Wanders Werner Falasi	
Barbados	Mobility			
Belarus	Opportunity			Called Forest of Future Technology, the pavilion was designed by NÜSSLI Adunic AG.
Belgium	Mobility		Assar Architects, Vincent Callebaut Architectures	Built by construction company BESIX Group, the pavilion has a theme of Smart and Green Belgium 2050.
Belize	Opportunity			
Benin	Sustainability			
Bhutan	Opportunity			The UAE is providing the pavilion free.
Bolivia	Mobility			
Bosnia and Herzegovina	Opportunity			
Botswana	Mobility			
Brazil	Sustainability			
Brunei	Opportunity		Al Jabal Engineering	
Bulgaria	Mobility			The pavilion features replicas of the Panagyurishte and Varna gold treasures.
Burkina Faso	Sustainability			The Burkina Faso pavilion includes a replica of the ruins of Loropéni.
Burundi	Opportunity			
(Cape Verde) Cabo Verde	Mobility			
Cambodia	Sustainability			
Cameroon	Opportunity			
Canada	Sustainability		Moriyama & Teshima	The pavilion is a round, wooden structure with the theme Canada: The Future in Mind. Outside the pavilion features the exhibit Traces, a series of eight cubes symbolizing the threat to species and ecosystems due to climate change. The pavilion's interior features a 360-degree theatre, which shows a seven-minute video with panoramic shots of Canadian landscapes with scenes from the country's COVID-19 response, wind farms, ports and people working in the agriculture and fishing industries.
Central African Republic	Sustainability			
Chad	Opportunity			
Chile	Mobility		LC Partner	
China	Opportunity	4,636 m^{2} (49,900 sq ft)		The pavilion features a nightly show of drones and lights. It is designed after a lantern.
Colombia	Opportunity		Pacheco Arquitectura	
Comoros	Sustainability			
Congo	Opportunity			The pavilion includes a series of photographs from Pieter Henket's Congo Tales.
Costa Rica	Mobility			
(Ivory Coast) Côte d'Ivoire	Mobility			
Croatia	Mobility		Ante Vrban	
Cuba	Sustainability			
Cyprus	Opportunity		The Cyprus pavilion was hosted by Aphrodite.	
Czech Republic	Sustainability		Formosa AA	The Czech pavilion's theme is Czech Spring and it includes a restaurant serving Czech food.
Denmark	Mobility		X Works	The Denmark pavilion includes an 18-meter-high domed observatory.
Djibouti	Mobility			
Dominica	Mobility			
Dominican Republic	Mobility			
DR Congo	Opportunity			The DR Congo pavilion's design is inspired by a termite mound.
Egypt	Opportunity		Hazem Hamada	The pavilion features the coffin of priest Psamtik (discovered in Saqqara in 2020) and replicas of King Tut's golden mask and sarcophagus, his Ka-guard statue, the special occasions chair, and his golden throne chair.
El Salvador	Mobility			
Equatorial Guinea	Sustainability			
Eritrea	Mobility			
Estonia	Mobility			
Eswatini	Mobility			
Ethiopia	Opportunity			The Ethiopia pavilion includes a replica of Lucy. Visitors can try types of coffee from around the world.
Fiji	Opportunity			
Finland	Mobility		JKMM Architects	The pavilion, Lumi, which means "snow" in Finnish and resembles a white tent made of snow, is inspired by the thin white layer of the first snowfall covering the Finnish landscape from autumn. The center of the pavilion is a wooden ‘gorge’ that has granite flooring, wooden walls, and natural light coming from the high roof accompanied by natural sounds from the forests of Finland. The pavilion features a voice-controlled Kone DX Class elevator, and a coffee machine by Wärtsilä, in cooperation with Soletair Power and Q Power, which is powered by synthetic fuel created from CO₂ extracted from the air using Power-to-X (P2X) conversion technologies.
France	Mobility		Atelier Perez Prado, Celnikier & Grabli Architects	The French pavillon, built by Besix, has the theme "Lumière, Lumières" ("Light, Enlightment"). The pavilion features an original edition of the 35-volume Diderot and d'Alembert Encyclopedia loaned by the French National Archives.
Gabon	Sustainability			The pavilion consists of different themed areas: forest, economic, tourism, culture, and conference. Eight traditional Gabonese masks loaned by the National Museum of Gabon are on display in the culture area.
Gambia	Mobility			
Georgia	Sustainability			
Germany	Sustainability		LAVA, Facts And Fiction	The pavilion, Campus Germany, features themed areas including The Energy Lab, The Future City Lab, and The Biodiversity Lab. This pavilion is also the winner of the 'Editor's Choice Awards at the World Expo Awards.
Ghana	Opportunity			
Greece	Sustainability		SALFO And Associates	
Grenada	Mobility			
Guatemala	Opportunity			
Guinea	Sustainability			
Guinea-Bissau	Opportunity			
Guyana	Opportunity			
Haiti	Mobility			
Holy See	Mobility			The pavilion includes three manuscripts from the Vatican Library and a reproduction of Michelangelo's The Creation of Adam from the Sistine Chapel.
Honduras	Opportunity			
Hungary	Mobility	1,828 m^{2} (19,680 sq ft)	Lőrinc Csernyus	It is a timber-framed pavilion, designed by Lőrinc Csernyus.
India	Opportunity	8,750 m^{2} (94,200 sq ft)	CP Kukreja Architects	Inaugurated by Union minister Piyush Goyal, the pavilion is four-storey with a façade consisting of 600 individual kinetic panels capable of simulation and motion. The ground floor showcases India's space program, yoga, and medicinal herbs. It also includes a model of the Statue of Unity. The first floor features an immersive experience of Indian landscapes and art, including a display of miniature models of the Taj Mahal, the Junagarh Fort, and the Ram Mandir.
Indonesia	Opportunity	1,860 m^{2} (20,000 sq ft)	PT Wijaya Karya	The pavilion is divided into three zones: Yesterday, Today, and Tomorrow.
Iran	Mobility	2,014 m^{2} (21,680 sq ft)	Shift Process Practice	Hundreds of balls made of fired clay hang from the Iran pavilion's walls.
Iraq	Opportunity		RAW-NYC Architects	The pavilion is a shell-like structure inspired by fishing nets.
Ireland	Mobility		Ciarán O'Connor	
Israel	Opportunity		AVS Creative	
Italy	Opportunity		Carlo Ratti Associati	The Italy pavilion includes a 3D-printed version of Michelangelo's David. This pavilion won the award for 'Best Elements/Details' at the World Expo Awards.
Jamaica	Mobility			The pavilion consists of seven zones displaying Jamaican history, sports, business and music.
Japan	Opportunity		Yuko Nagayama/NTT Facilities	The Japan pavilion's façade design combines traditional Arabesque and Asanoha patterns. The pavilion is divided into six scenes: Encountering Japan, Culture and history, Innovation, Issues, Where Ideas Meet, and Designing Future Society for Our Lives – Expo 2025 Osaka, Kansai.
Jordan	Mobility		Facts And Fiction GmbH	Its theme is The Thresholds of Ingenuity.
Kazakhstan	Opportunity		ARDECO And Insglueck.	On 11 November 2021, the Astana Times reported that over 200,000 people had already visited the Kazakhstan pavilion since it opened on 1 October. In December 2021, the flag-raising ceremony for the national flag of Kazakhstan was held at the central square of the EXPO Al Wasl Plaza. Prime Minister of Kazakhstan Askar Mamin and the Minister of Tolerance and Coexistence and Commissioner-General of Expo 2020 Dubai, Sheikh Nahyan bin Mubarak Al Nahyan, attended the event.
Kenya	Opportunity			
Kiribati	Mobility			
Kosovo	Mobility			
Kuwait	Sustainability		Marco Pestalozza	The pavilion's exterior design consists of a large water tower encircled by a golden façade of prisms, representing the country's sand dunes.
Kyrgyzstan	Opportunity			
Laos	Mobility			
Latvia	Opportunity		DJA	
Lebanon	Opportunity		Biel Group	The pavilion features dozens of swings that urge visitors to "fly above Lebanon" and enjoy drone shots of Lebanon's landscape.
Lesotho	Sustainability			
Liberia	Opportunity			
Libya	Mobility			
Lithuania	Sustainability	15.5 acre	Baukas	The 15.5-acre Lithuania pavilion, called Openarium, is in the sustainability zone and designed by MB "Baukas", who won a design competition against 11 other entrants.
Luxembourg	Opportunity			
Madagascar	Sustainability			
Malawi	Opportunity			
Malaysia	Sustainability	1,234 m^{2} (13,280 sq ft)	Hijjas Architects and Planners	
Maldives	Sustainability			
Mali	Opportunity			The Mali pavilion features an artwork by Abdoulaye Konaté.
Malta	Opportunity			The pavilion consists of four zones: Tourism, Investment and Trade, Innovation, and Creativity and Lifestyle.
Marshall Islands	Opportunity			
Mauritania	Mobility			The Mauritania pavilion features a racing boat.
Mauritius	Opportunity			The Mauritius pavilion includes a life-size display of a dodo.
Mexico	Mobility		Capital Engineering	The exterior of the pavilion is covered with a crochet work made by 100 women from Jalisco.
Federated States of Micronesia	Mobility			
Moldova	Mobility			
Monaco	Opportunity		AODA, OOS	The Monaco pavilion's design is inspired by the Rock of Monaco.
Mongolia	Mobility			The pavilion features works of Mongolian photographers and artifacts from the National Museum of Mongolia, including paper money and ornaments from the Yuan dynasty, and ethnic utensils and ornaments used by the Mongolian aristocracy. Visitors to the pavilion can also play shagai.
Montenegro	Sustainability			
Morocco	Opportunity		Tarik Oualalou	The pavilion has seven stories and consists of 22 houses stacked on top of each other connected by a single winding street.
Mozambique	Sustainability			The Mozambique pavilion includes a kite installation featuring traditional prints.
Myanmar	Opportunity			
Namibia	Opportunity			
Nauru	Mobility			
Nepal	Mobility			
Netherlands	Sustainability		V8 Architects	The pavilion extracts between 1,000 and 2,000 liters of water per day from the air and features a cone-shaped vertical farm with 9,500 edible plants and crops.
New Zealand	Sustainability		Jasmax	
Nicaragua	Mobility			
Niger	Mobility			
Nigeria	Opportunity			The pavilion features a life-size horse sculpture by Dotun Popoola.
North Macedonia	Mobility			
Norway	Opportunity	680 m^{2} (7,300 sq ft) exhibition space	Rintala Eggertsson Architects, Expomobilia and FiveCurrents	This pavilion talks about ocean conversation.
Oman	Mobility		F&M Middle East	
Pakistan	Opportunity	2,900 m^{2} (31,000 sq ft)	Al Jabal Engineering	The Pakistan pavilion, Hidden Treasures, in the Opportunity zone, occupying 2,900-sqm, is designed with the potential of legacy Pakistan Culture and Heritage Centre. It received the silver award for Exhibition Design in the self-built pavilions - Category A.
Palau	Mobility			
Palestine	Opportunity	1,250 m^{2} (13,500 sq ft)	Al Nasher	The Palestine pavilion is between the Saudi and UAE pavilion, and occupies 1,250 square metres.
Panama	Mobility			
Papua New Guinea	Sustainability			
Paraguay	Mobility			
Peru	Mobility	2,500 m^{2} (27,000 sq ft)	Habitare	The Peru pavilion features a replica of the ancient Inca bridge of Queshuachaca. This pavilion is the winner of the "People's Choice Awards" at the World Expo Awards.
Philippines	Sustainability	1,386 m^{2} (14,920 sq ft)	Royal Pineda	The pavilion is named Bangkóta, after the old Tagalog word for "coral reef" and features a sculpture of Haliya by Duddley Diaz; a boat sculpture "Vessel of Time", by Patrick Cabral, symbolizing the Filipinos' Austronesian ancestors who were maritime people; and an art installation, "Flying Men" by Charlie Co, paying homage to overseas Filipino workers.
Poland	Mobility		WXCA and Bellprat Partner	The Polish pavilion was designed by the Polish studio WXCA and the Swiss studio Bellprat Partner. It won the prestigious international award the Best Large Pavilion in the WORLD EXPO AWARDS competition. The General Contractor for the Polish Pavilion was a consortium of Międzynarodowe Targi Poznańskie and FM Aldentro.
Portugal	Sustainability		Saraiva + Associados	Included Magellanic Penguins by Bordalo II.
Qatar	Opportunity		Santiago Calatrava	
Romania	Sustainability		Cumulus Architecture	The pavilion includes a water bar, "H2RO", featuring a selection of bottled mineral waters from Romania's springs.
Russia	Mobility	More than 4,500 m^{2} (48,000 sq ft)	Tchoban SPEECH	The Russian pavilion is 27 metres tall and covers more than 4,500 square metres. It features an immersive installation of the human brain, "The Mechanics of Wonder", by Simpateka Entertainment Group. In amidst at the start of the 2022 Russian invasion of Ukraine, the pavilion continued until the end.
Rwanda	Opportunity			
Saint Kitts and Nevis	Sustainability			
Saint Lucia	Opportunity			
Saint Vincent and the Grenadines	Opportunity			
Samoa	Opportunity			
San Marino	Opportunity			The San Marino Pavilion includes a replica of the Domagnano Treasure.
São Tomé and Príncipe	Sustainability			
Saudi Arabia	Opportunity	13,059 m^{2} (140,570 sq ft)	Boris Micka Associates	Saudi Arabia wins ‘Best Pavilion’ award at Expo 2020 Dubai.
Senegal	Mobility			
Serbia	Mobility	2,000 m^{2} (22,000 sq ft)	A3 Architects Studio	
Seychelles	Sustainability			
Sierra Leone	Opportunity			
Singapore	Sustainability		WOHA	The Singapore pavilion features 80,000 plants from 170 different species.
Slovakia	Mobility		Ivan Kulifaj	The main exhibits of the Slovak pavilion are the MH2 hydrogen-powered car, the Androver I and II space mobile robots, and the VRM flight simulator.
Slovenia	Sustainability	1,550 m^{2} (16,700 sq ft)	Robert Klun, Sandi Pirš	The pavilion's ground floor consists of the Europe Square, the Showroom featuring presentations by Slovenian companies and the Slovenian Tourist Board, and the Interactive Room showing Slovenian natural and cultural heritage and sports achievements. The first floor consists of the Green Room and Smart Room, which feature 360° films about Slovenian innovations. The Slovenian Business Center, which hosts high-level governmental and business meetings, is located on the second floor.
Solomon Islands	Opportunity			
Somalia	Opportunity			
South Africa	Opportunity		MultiChoice Group	
South Korea	Mobility		Mooyuki Architects	The pavilion's façade consists of 1,597 rotating cubes with one digital face and three analogue color faces.
South Sudan	Opportunity			
Spain	Sustainability		Amann Cánovas Maruri	The Spanish pavilion features a six-meter hyperloop model, the Z01, developed by Zeleros.
Sri Lanka	Opportunity		University of Moratuwa students in Sri Lanka	The pavilion is designed along the theme of water. There are digital screens and visitors can learn about the Sri Lanka tea and the key attractions in Sri Lanka. (Tagline: Rich in many facets which can enrich the world.)
Sudan	Mobility			Sudan's pavilion is inspired by Nubian houses.
Suriname	Sustainability			
Sweden	Sustainability	2,370 m^{2} (25,500 sq ft)	Alessandro Ripellino Arkitekter, Studio Adrien Gardère and Luigi Pardo Architetti	The Swedish pavilion, "The Forest", is located in the Expo's Sustainability District and is built entirely of wood with a holistic sustainability approach as a starting point. The pavilion consists of 300 actual tree trunks and the upper floors of the pavilion are built as individual tree houses. The theme for Sweden's pavilion is "Co-creation for Innovation" and focuses on Swedish strength areas such as innovation, technology and sustainability.
Switzerland	Opportunity			
Syria	Mobility		XYZ Designers	Hosted by Dima Kandalaft, the Syria pavilion showcases the Ugaritic alphabet. The pavilion also unveils the arrangement of the "Song of Nikkal" by Iyad Rimawi.
Tajikistan	Sustainability			
Tanzania	Mobility			
Thailand	Mobility		Index Creative Village	Hosted by Rak and Mali, the pavilion's façade is covered with more than 500 artificial "dok rak" crown flowers.
Timor-Leste	Opportunity			
Togo	Mobility			
Tonga	Opportunity			The Tongan pavilion features The Earth is my Friend installation.
Trinidad and Tobago	Mobility		Agyei Archer Ltd.	
Tunisia	Opportunity		Noaf Interiors LLC	
Turkey	Sustainability			
Turkmenistan	Mobility		Tekmil	The pavilion features a fountain sculpture of five Akhal-Teke horses at its entrance.
Tuvalu	Mobility			
Uganda	Opportunity			
Ukraine	Opportunity	2,600 m^{2} (28,000 sq ft)	Wanders Werner Falasi	The pavilion's ground level features the exhibitions "Field", which consists of real and artistic forms of wheat, and "Thinking", which consists of a cube with a multi-textured surface symbolizing smart thinking, as well as a multimedia gallery, "Smart Life". The second level is an open space with 26 embroideries representing Ukraine's cultural, art, and architectural accomplishments. The top level features a contemporary art exhibition, "Ellipsis", and an interactive bar with a robot, "SkyLab robo-complex". In amidst at the start of the 2022 Russian invasion of Ukraine, visitors posted sticky notes on the walls to support Ukraine.
United Arab Emirates	Opportunity	15,064 m^{2} (162,150 sq ft)	Santiago Calatrava	The UAE pavilion is shaped like a falcon in flight - the official symbol of the UAE. The architects have created a sustainable pavilion, drawing inspiration from the local vernacular. Certified LEED Platinum, this is the largest pavilion at Expo 2020, designed to be converted to a cultural institution for years to come. It spans across an area of 15,000 metres (over 161,000 square feet) and 27.8 metres in height, making it the largest pavilion at Expo 2020. An Oculus skylight at the apex of the roof mirrors the form of the Expo 2020 logo. The pavilion roof consists of 28 carbon and glass-fiber movable wings having masses ranging from 5 to 18 tons and total lengths from 30 to 65 m, all actuated and controlled by a hydraulic system. When open, the wings reveal a surface grid of photovoltaic panels. The panels have been designed to absorb the maximum amount of sunlight to harvest energy which is returned to the main power grid. When closed, the wings shelter and protect the photovoltaic panels from rain and sandstorms. The pavilion consists of six different zones.
United Kingdom	Opportunity		Es Devlin Studio	The pavilion's cone shape consists of slats featuring a continuously changing message generated by AI and visitors' contributions, inspired by a project from Stephen Hawking.
United States	Opportunity	3,300 m^{2} (36,000 sq ft)	Woods Bagot	The pavilion showcases Thomas Jefferson's copy of the Quran, a Moon rock sample collected by American astronaut Jack Schmitt during the Apollo 17 mission, a 43-meter tall replica of the Falcon 9 booster, and a replica of the Mars Opportunity Rover.
Uruguay	Mobility		Al Shirawi Contracting Co.	
Uzbekistan	Sustainability		OP3 Expo	
Vanuatu	Mobility			
Venezuela	Opportunity		Wanders Werner Falasi	The multicolored pavilion features a visual exhibit of ordinary Venezuelan citizens, a 360-degree exhibit of Venezuelan landscapes and ecosystems, showcases with Venezuelan main exports and minerals, and a mural by Juvenal Ravelo with an unfinished section for visitors to paint.
Vietnam	Opportunity		I5 and MarknB	The façade of the pavilion is covered with 800 traditional conical hats from Hội An and a display of 18 replica artworks created by Vietnamese artists for the National Assembly building in Hanoi.
Yemen	Sustainability			
Zambia	Opportunity			
Zimbabwe	Opportunity			The untapped jewel of Africa includes a replica of Great Zimbabwe.

=== Partner pavilions ===
Name	Sub theme	Size	Architect	Notes
DP World	Opportunity		Yaghmour Architects	The pavilion will become a permanent faculty dedicated to logistics after Expo 2020.
Dubai Electricity and Water Authority	Sustainability			
Emirates	Opportunity		Pulse Group	
Emirates National Oil Company	Opportunity	2,060 sqm	Jack Morton	
PepsiCo	Mobility			Bolt, sponsored by Gatorade
PepsiCo	Opportunity			Plus, sponsored by Pepsi and Lay's
PepsiCo	Sustainability			Drop, sponsored by Aquafina and built with recycled cans

=== Organisation pavilions ===
Name	Sub theme	Size	Architect	Notes
African Union	Opportunity			The pavilion is divided into three zones: Our History, Our Transformation, and Our Heritage.
Arab League	Opportunity			
ASEAN	Mobility			
Dubai Cares	Opportunity		PICO	
Fazaa	Mobility			
(Cooperation Council for the Arab States of the Gulf) Gulf Cooperation Council	Opportunity			The pavilion will feature a central pool of water and a giant knot pendulum symbolising one Gulf.
Investment Corporation of Dubai	Opportunity		ALEC FIT OUT	
Muslim World League	Mobility			
(Organisation of Islamic Cooperation) Organization of Islamic Cooperation	Mobility			
United Arab Emirates University	Mobility		BASE Engineering, TODO, F&M	
World Expo Museum	Mobility		Shanghai Modern National Ex.	

=== Special pavilions ===
Name	Sub theme	Size	Architect	Notes
Alif – The Mobility Pavilion	Mobility		Foster and Partners	Alif – The Mobility Pavilion features the world's largest passenger lift, capable of transporting 160+ people at a time.
Around the World	Mobility		Hopkins Architects Dubai Ltd	
Baden-Württemberg	Opportunity	2,300 m^{2} (25,000 sq ft)	NÜSSLI Adunic	More than 70 tonnes of spruce were shipped to Dubai from Baden-Württemberg to construct the pavilion.
The Good Place	Opportunity		Ahmad Abdulrahman Bukhash	The pavilion features projects of Expo Live's Innovation Impact Grant Programme, which supports 140 grassroots innovators from 76 countries.
Mission Possible – The Opportunity Pavilion	Opportunity		AGi Architects	The pavilion is the winner of the 'Best Exhibit/Display' award at the World Expo Awards.
Terra – The Sustainability Pavilion	Sustainability		Grimshaw Architects	
Vision Pavilion	Sustainability		Icaria Atelier	The pavilion is the winner of the 'Best Small Pavilion' at the Word Expo Awards.
Warner Bros.	Opportunity		Almost Impossible Agency	Also known as the Gotham City Pavilion or the DC Comics Pavilion, it was an escape room center themed around the Batcave from the hit movie, The Batman, based on the DC Comics superhero of the same name.
Women's Pavilion	Sustainability			

== Mascots ==
There are 6 mascots: Salama, Rashid, Latifa, Alif, Opti and Terra. Rashid and Latifa are a 9- and 8-year-old brother and sister duo; Salama is a ghaf tree; and Alif, Opti and Terra are the respective guardian mascots for the mobility, opportunity and sustainability pavilions.

== Partners ==
In order to raise awareness about smart recycling, Expo 2020 organized nationwide bus tours with the waste partner Dulsco. L'Oréal was the expo's beauty partner. Accenture was the expo's Digital Services Premier Partner. Cisco was the expo's Official Premier Digital Network Partner. CNN was the official broadcaster for Dubai Expo 2020. DP World was the expo's Premier Global Trade Partner.

Sponsors of Expo 2020
Official Premier Partners
- Accenture
- Cisco
- DP World
- Etisalat
- Emirates
- Emirates NBD
- G42
- Mastercard
- Nissan
- PepsiCo
- SAP
- Siemens
- Terminus Group
Official Partners
- Christie
- Reckitt (Dettol)
- Dubai Chamber of Commerce and Industry
- Dubai Electricity and Water Authority
- Dulsco
- Emaar Hospitality
- Emirates National Oil Company
- L'Oréal
- UPS
Official Providers
- Canon Inc.
- Digital14
- Domino's
- Etisalat (Esharah)
- Jacobs Solutions-Mace
- Orient Insurance
- Swatch
- Talabat

== Developments ==
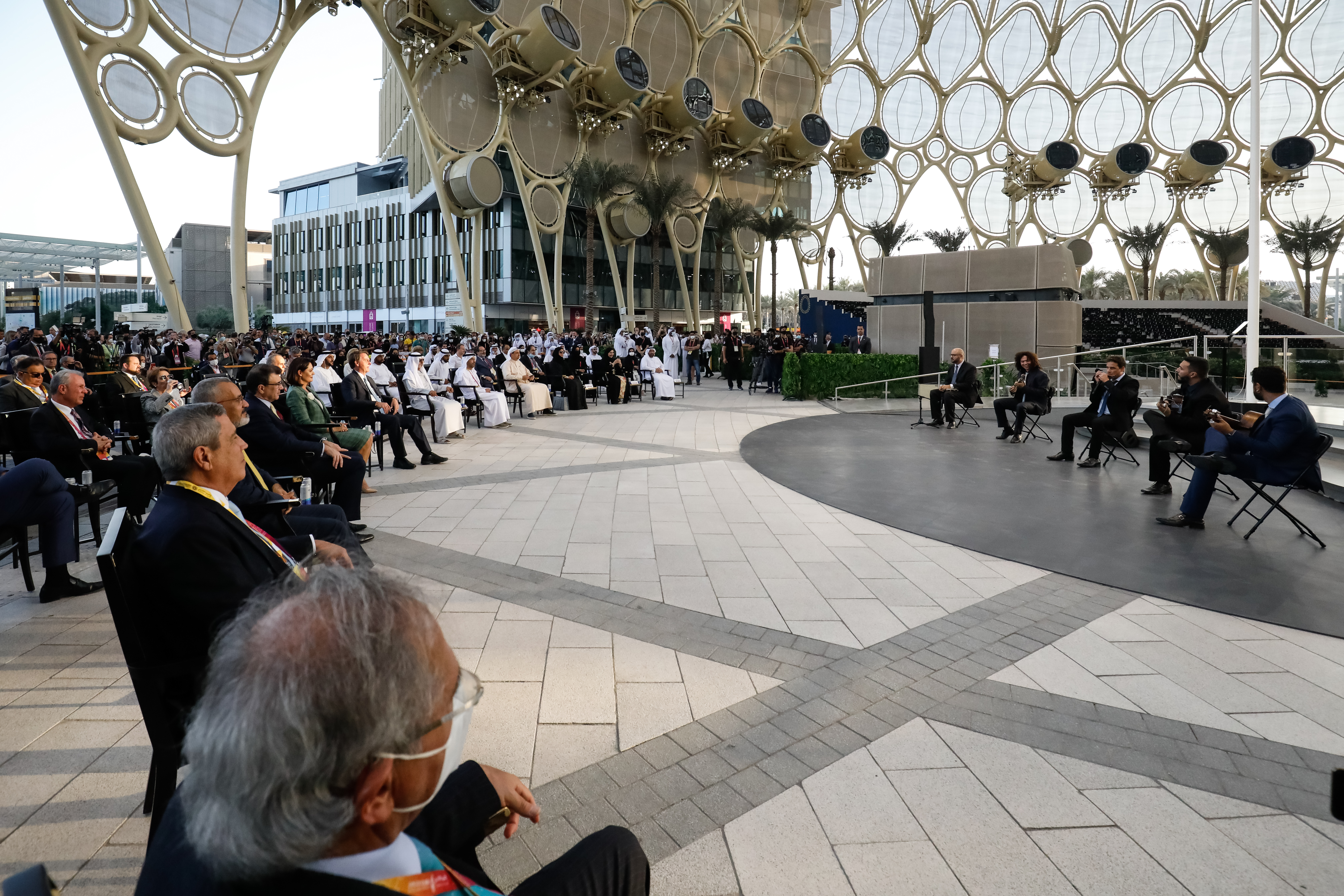
Al Wasl Plaza

=== Economic ===
The Dubai Expo 2020 is associated with a rise in the UAE's GDP, as predicted by the International Monetary Fund.

=== Diplomatic ===
In November 2019, the UAE permitted Israeli passport holders to enter the country during Expo 2020. Israelis were allowed to have their own pavilion at the event and to even visit the country afterwards. In August 2020, the UAE and Israel agreed to fully normalize relations, superseding the previous agreement.

At the Expo 2020, the Emirati economy minister Abdulla bin Touq Al Marri, signed a deal with his Syrian counterpart, Mohammad Samer al-Khalil, with an aim of boosting trade between the two nations. Top officials from Bashar al-Assad’s regime attended the event. Syrian companies were also seen openly promoting their products at the Dubai Expo. It marked the little steps that the UAE was taking to move closer to Assad, who is shunned by majority of the world for his record of human rights abuses. Some Syrian companies also registered offshore entities in the UAE to conceal their origins and avoid the US and European sanctions. The Arab nation also assisted the Syrian importers to pay their international suppliers through Emirati accounts.

After the Russian invasion of Ukraine in February 2022, Expo 2020 said it would not block Russian participation in Expo 2020. Russia had a prominent pavilion at the event.

=== Impact of the COVID-19 pandemic ===
In 2020, the globally expanding COVID-19 pandemic brought Expo 2020 Dubai under scrutiny, as the event was expected to attract nearly 25 million visitors in October that year. In March, the Geneva Council for Rights and Liberties warned against the abuse and exploitation of migrant workers in the United Arab Emirates. While rest of the country was under a lockdown due to the spread of coronavirus, the migrants continued to work on Expo 2020. The Geneva Council condemned the “discriminatory treatment of migrant workers”, urging the WHO to encourage the UAE to ensure their health and safety.

On 25 March 2020, a staff member was tested positive.

On 30 March 2020, the expo indicated that it was investigating postponement of the world's fair, which would require a two thirds' majority agreement from a BIE annual general meeting. On 4 April 2020, the BIE announced that a meeting of the executive committee would take place virtually on 21 April to discuss a proposal to hold the expo between 1 October 2021 and 31 March 2022. A final decision would need a two thirds majority vote from BIE members.

On 21 April, the executive committee unanimously agreed to delay the expo until 1 October 2021 – 31 March 2022, with this then going to a remote vote of the general assembly. There is no proposal to change the name of the expo.

On 4 May 2020, the BIE announced that the threshold to agree a delay had been passed, although the vote was to open until 29 May. At 6pm Paris time, 29 May, the decision was confirmed, along with retention of the name Expo 2020 Dubai. New dates have been announced for 1 October 2021 – 31 March 2022.

On 15 September 2021, organizers announced that visitors to Expo 2020 will be required to present a proof of vaccination or a negative PCR test taken within the previous 72 hours.

=== World Chess Championship ===
Due to the COVID-19 pandemic, the World Chess Championship 2021 was rescheduled to take place between 24 November 2021 and 16 December 2021 as part of Expo 2020 Dubai. The match was won by reigning World Chess Champion Magnus Carlsen of Norway, taking on challenger Ian Nepomniachtchi of Russia, who was victorious in the 2020–21 Candidates Tournament.

== Criticism ==
A month before Expo 2020, the European Parliament passed a resolution against the event, urging its member states and other nations to not participate. Citing the Human rights record of the United Arab Emirates, the EU also called for the international companies, who were sponsoring the event, to withdraw their sponsorship. The EU stated that the Emirati construction firms and businesses had been exploiting the rights of the migrant workers by forcing them to sign untranslated agreements, confiscating their passports, and leaving them to work for long hours and live in unsanitary conditions. The UAE rejected the resolution as "factually incorrect".

More than half of the 69 workers interviewed for a survey admitted paying recruitment fees in their home countries to acquire their positions. Many workers said their employers were aware of the practice but did nothing to stop it or repay the payments. Two-thirds of migrant workers polled said their wages or other benefits were not always paid on time or in full, leaving them unable to pay their bills or send money home to their families.

Human Rights Watch said any parties connected with the Expo should use the event to raise awareness of human rights abuses in the country. In a statement, Michael Page, deputy Middle East director at HRW, said: "Dozens of UAE peaceful domestic critics have been arrested, railroaded in blatantly unfair trials, and condemned to many years in prison simply for trying to express their ideas on governance and human rights." Page called the event "yet another opportunity for the UAE to falsely present itself on the world stage as open, tolerant, and rights-respecting while shutting down the space for politics, public discourse, and activism", and called on participating countries to "ensure that they are not helping the UAE whitewash its image and obscure its abuses".

As the UAE launched the World Expo Fair in October 2021, over two dozen human rights groups initiated an alternative expo online. The campaign was held to counter the Dubai Expo's targeted narrative of “tolerance” and “openness”. In the event, activists came together with poets, musicians, and visual artists from the Middle East to highlight the repression in the UAE and to stand in solidarity with the prisoners of conscience. The campaign also called for the release of human rights activists, including Ahmed Mansoor, Nasser bin Ghaith and three from the UAE-94: Mohammed al-Roken, Mohammed al-Mansoori and Mohammed Abdul Razzaq al-Siddiq.

The Emirati labor practices have been subject to criticism, resulting in Dubai authorities ensured to hold companies with fairly high standards of worker treatment for the event. Two months after the Expo 2020 commenced, human rights groups reported about the persisting violations. Migrant workers hired for the Expo 2020 were complaining about having to make exorbitant and illegal payments to local recruiters. Others complained of passport confiscation, broken promises on wages, unaffordable food, long working hours (sometimes in extremely hot weather), crowded, and unsanitary living conditions in dormitories. The human rights concerns and labor abuses at the Expo prompted the European Parliament to call for a boycott of the event.

Three workers died from construction accidents building the Expo and three from COVID-19.

In February 2022, a human rights and labor rights NGO called Equidem reported about the extensive abuse of migrant laborers being practiced by Emirati authorities at the Dubai Expo 2020. The allegations included charging illegal recruitment fees from the migrant workers, subjecting them to forced labor and racial discrimination, followed by delayed wages and confiscation of their passports. Those on the receiving end of the abuse were migrant laborers working as security guards, hospitality staff, cleaners, etc., at the Dubai Expo 2020. The report claimed that the UAE's failure at protecting migrant workers during the event not only risked the reputation of the participating countries and companies. The UAE and Expo 2020 authorities refrained from commenting despite multiple requests.

== Bids and bidding ==
Once the first city had lodged a bid with the BIE, other cities had six months to respond. In early 2011, İzmir of Turkey and Ayutthaya of Thailand submitted bids to the BIE, initiating the six-month window for other cities to bid. When this window closed on 2 November 2011, there were five prospective cities, with Dubai making a last-minute entry. The BIE voted and selected the host city on 27 November 2013.

Five cities originally bid for the slot for a world's fair in 2020, with four remaining: Dubai, United Arab Emirates; Yekaterinburg, Russia; İzmir, Turkey; or São Paulo, Brazil. Expo 2020 will represent a first as a Middle Eastern destination will be hosting the event for the first time.

The following cities lodged bids to the BIE for hosting the 2020 EXPO:

- İzmir, Turkey
- Yekaterinburg, Russia
- São Paulo, Brazil
- Dubai, United Arab Emirates

São Paulo was eliminated from contention after the first round of votes. İzmir was knocked out in the second. Yekaterinburg lost to Dubai in the third and final round of voting.

=== Dubai Expo ===
The UAE selected the theme "Connecting Minds, Creating the Future" and the sub-themes Sustainability, Mobility and Opportunity. Expo 2020 Dubai has not only generated learnings for future expos, it has become a powerful symbol of national pride. It has reimagined the idea of Expo into something bigger: Expo Forever.

On 27 November 2013, when Dubai won the right to host the Expo 2020, fireworks erupted at the world's tallest building, Burj Khalifa. A national holiday was declared the following day for all educational institutions across the country. The staging of the world fair and the preparations leading up to it are expected to result in 277,000 new jobs in the UAE, an injection of nearly $40 billion into the economy, and an increase in visitors of at least 25 million and up to 100 million. Jumeirah Lake Towers, was given the name "Burj 2020" in honour of the World Expo 2020.

=== Yekaterinburg Expo ===
The Russian bid The Global Mind would have run from 1 May to 31 October, and would have been the second-largest expo (after 2010 in Shanghai) and was intended to "survey world opinion through seven universal questions".

=== İzmir Expo ===
The Turkish bid had a theme of New Routes to a Better World / Health for All and would have run from 30 April to 31 October. A Health for All symposium was held in October 2013 for BIE delegates and was to discuss health issues across the world. İzmir had beat Ankara in securing government support for the bid.

=== São Paulo Expo ===
A Brazilian expo would have been called Power of Diversity, Harmony for Growth, run from 15 May to 15 November, and would have covered 502 hectares.

=== Other cities ===
Other participating cities and countries that were not selected for the final voting process to host Expo 2020, or did not submit bids for consideration by the BIE:

- Ayutthaya was Thailand's official nomination to host Expo 2020. The province was chosen and approved as Thailand's bid city to host World Expo 2020 by the Thai cabinet as the Prime Minister, Abhisit Vejjajiva, announced during the Shanghai World Expo 2010. Ayutthaya brought a bid under the theme "Redefine Globalisation – Balanced Life, Sustainable Living" concept when bidding on behalf of Thailand to host. Thailand's bid was disqualified by the Bureau of International Expositions because of concerns that the bid did not have sufficient government support.
- The United States has had several citizen efforts directed at bringing a World's Fair to the country. These efforts included the following cities:
  - Houston – "Inspired Innovation"
  - New York City – "Showcasing the World"
  - San Francisco – "Interculture: Celebrating the World's Cultures while Creating New Ones through Interaction and Exchange"
  - Las Vegas – "The future of my future," according to the Wall Street Journal
- Philippines did not bid for the Expo 2020 although Manila had been considered a possible contender under the theme "Manila, Celebrating Light and Life".
- Brisbane, Queensland, Australia also considered putting an official bid to host Expo 2020 but did not bid.
- Sydney, New South Wales, Australia had been quoted by media reports as another potential candidate for the Australian 2020 bid, but ultimately did not after losing the bid for the right to host Expo 2012.

== Ticket prices ==
Three types of passes can be booked: daily passes, monthly passes and seasonal passes. The daily pass is applicable for one day only, costing AED 95. The monthly pass offers unrestricted entry for 30 consecutive days and costs AED 195. The seasonal pass offers unlimited entry for the entire six months of the Expo and costs AED 495. Entry is free for children below the age of 18, students holding valid ID cards of recognized academic institutions, and visitors aged 60 and above. Tickets are also free for people of determination (disabled people), with 50% off being offered for one caretaker. Tickets went on sale worldwide from 18 July 2021 at the Expo's official website expo2020dubai.com. For the last 50 days of Expo, a ticket was AED 10. Free admission was given to everyone on UAE National Day.

== Stamps on Expo 2020 ==
Stamps on Expo 2020 issued by postal administrations

Year	Country	Topic / Pavilion Theme	No. of stamps	Denomination / Value	Date of issue
2013	Turkey	Expo 2020 İzmir Candidacy	1	4.40 ₤ - Turkish lira	Apr 4th
2014	United Arab Emirates	Expo 2020 Candidacy winner	3	AED 3 for the 2 stamps, AED 10 for the Souvenir Sheet	Sep 30th
2020	Monaco	Monaco 360	1	€1.16 - Euro	Oct 2nd
2021	France	France Pavilion	1	€1.50 - Euro	Jun 21st
2021	Czech Republic	National Pavilion at Expo 2020	1	Z º (Kč 45.00)	Sept 8th
2021	Luxembourg	Architectural design of the Pavilion	1	€0.80 - Euro	Sept 14th
2021	San Marino	Expo 2020	1	€3.90 - Euro	Sep 21st
2021	United Nations	Connecting Minds, Creating the future	3	Contains three stamps, one for each UN Office. Denominations are US$1.30, CHF 2.00 and €1.80	Oct 1st
2021	Poland	Creativity inspired by nature	1	8 zł - Polish złoty	Oct 1st
2021	United Arab Emirates	Connecting Minds, Creating the future	6	AED 3 for the 5 stamps, AED 20 for the Souvenir Sheet	Oct 1st
2021	Brazil	Architectural design of the Pavilion	3	5.20 R$ - Brazilian real	Oct 18th
2021	Angola	From Tradition to Innovation	5	Kz 3 - 4 stamps in sheetlet, Kz 1.2 - 1 stamp in MS	Unknown
2022	Oman	Experience a Nation - Growth, Harvest, Trade, Use	5	1 Riyal - 4 stamps in sheetlet & MS	Jan 18th
2022	Slovakia	Arabic coin - Trading in ancient Slavic Bratislava	1	€2.10 - Euro	Jan 21st
2022	Algeria	Architectural design of the Pavilion	2	25 and 50 Dinar	Mar 1st

== Postcard on Expo 2020 ==
Postcard on Expo 2020 issued by postal administrations

Year	Country	Topic / Pavilion Theme	No. of Postcards	Denomination / Value	Date of issue
2014	United Arab Emirates	Expo 2020 Candidacy winner	2	AED 5 each	Apr 4th
2021	United Arab Emirates	Connecting Minds, Creating the future	1	AED 5 (Only available as part of a set costing AED 45)	Apr 4th
2021	United Arab Emirates	Connecting Minds, Creating the future	1	Distributed in Expo as a gift to visitors on December 3.	Apr 4th
2022	Portugal	Portugal Pavilion	1	€0.91 - Euro	Jan 14th

== Expo City Dubai ==
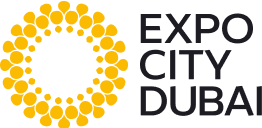
Expo City Dubai Logo

After the six-month-long running of Expo 2020, the site used for the fair became part of a 3,000,000 square meter development called Expo City Dubai. Earlier branded as District 2020, Expo City Dubai is designed to be a "15-minute city" and will include 200,000 sq m of commercial and residential spaces with buildings like the Al Wasl Dome being retained in the district's design. Abiding by the rule of sustainability, Terra - The Sustainability Pavilion will become a children and science centre, while Alif - The Mobility Pavilion will become an office building. Mission Possible - The Opportunity Pavilion will be rebuilt as the Expo 2020 Museum and the UAE Pavilion will become the UAE's cultural centre. Only some of the most popular pavilions like those of India, Egypt and Saudi Arabia will remain as it is. The Water Feature and Garden in the Sky attractions are set to remain. Two hospitals, a school, and 200,000 square meters of office space will be added. The district will be well-connected to the rest of the city and country by road and is located near the Al Maktoum International Airport. The Expo 2020 metro station, located next to the Al Wasl Gate, will be renamed as Expo City Metro Station in the future. The ROVE Hotel will also stay.

In 2022, Sheikh Mohammed bin Rashid Al Maktoum, PM and VP of the UAE and Ruler of Dubai, announced the new plan for District 2020 as Expo City Dubai. Later that year, Sheikh Mohamed bin Zayed Al Nahyan, the president of the UAE, announced that the COP28 Climate Summit would be held in Expo City Dubai. The development opened on 1 October 2022.

Ahead of the official opening of the Expo City, visitors will be able to visit the Alif Pavilion – The Mobility Pavilion, and Terra Pavilion – The Sustainability Pavilion, as early as September 1. Expo City Dubai will also feature an education program where students can participate in a number of experiences, exhibits and interactive workshops. The tickets for the Alif and Terra pavilions cost AED 50 per person.

=== Fates of the pavilions and attractions ===
- Afghanistan: Remained the same.
- Algeria: Removed. Monument will be marked on original site.
- Alif - The Mobility: Became an office building.
- Angola: Remained the same.
- Argentina: Removed. Monument will be marked on original site.
- Australia: Removed. Monument will be marked on original site.
- Austria: Removed. Monument will be marked on original site.
- Azerbaijan: Removed. Monument will be marked on original site.
- Bahrain: Removed. Monument will be marked on original site.
- Belarus: Removed. Monument will be marked on original site.
- Belgium: Removed. Monument will be marked on original site.
- Brazil: Removed. Monument will be marked on original site.
- Brunei: Removed. Monument will be marked on original site.
- Canada: Removed. Monument will be marked on original site.
- Colombia: Removed. Monument will be marked on original site.
- Chile: Removed. Monument will be marked on original site.
- China: Remained the same.
- Czechia: Removed. Monument will be marked on original site.
- Denmark: Removed. Monument will be marked on original site.
- Egypt: Remained the same.
- Estonia: Remained the same.
- Fan Club: Remained the same.
- Finland: Removed. Monument will be marked on original site.
- France: Removed and relocated to Toulouse. Monument will be marked on the original site.
- Garden in the Sky: Remained the same.
- Germany: Removed. Monument will be marked on original site.
- Hungary: Removed. Monument will be marked on original site.
- India: Remained the same.
- Indonesia: Removed. Monument will be marked on original site.
- Iran: Removed. Monument will be marked on original site.
- Iraq: Removed. Monument will be marked on original site.
- Ireland: Removed. Monument will be marked on original site.
- Israel: Removed. Monument will be marked on original site.
- Italy: Removed. Monument will be marked on original site.
- Japan: Removed. Monument will be marked on original site.
- Kazakhstan: Remained the same.
- Kuwait: Removed. Monument will be marked on original site.
- Latvia: Remained the same.
- Lebanon: Removed. Monument will be marked on original site.
- Lithuania: Removed. Monument will be marked on original site.
- Luxembourg: Removed. Monument will be marked on original site.
- Malaysia: Became the Aerodyne Group's Dubai office.
- Mexico: Remained the same.
- Malta: Became the Stories Of Nation's - Opportunity
- Mission Possible – The Opportunity: Became the Expo 2020 Museum.
- Monaco: Removed. Monument will be marked on original site.
- Morocco: Remained the same.
- Netherlands: Removed. Monument will be marked on original site.
- New Zealand: Removed. Monument will be marked on original site.
- Norway: Remained the same.
- Oman: Removed. Remained the same.
- Pakistan: Removed. Monument will be marked on original site.
- Palestine: Remained the same.
- Panama: Removed. Monument will be marked on original site.
- Peru: Removed. Monument will be marked on original site.
- Philippines: Removed. Monument will be marked on original site.
- Poland: Removed. Monument will be marked on original site.
- Portugal: Removed. Monument will be marked on original site.
- Qatar: Removed. Monument will be marked on original site.
- Romania: Became the Stories Of Nation's - Sustainability
- Russia: Removed. Monument will be marked on original site.
- Sao Tome and Principe: Became the Stories Of Nation's - Mobility
- Saudi Arabia: Remained the same.
- Serbia: Removed. Monument will be marked on original site.
- Singapore: Removed. Monument will be marked on original site.
- Slovenia: Removed. Monument will be marked on original site.
- Spain: Removed. Monument will be marked on original site.
- South Korea: Removed. Monument will be marked on original site.
- Sweden: Removed. Monument will be marked on original site.
- Switzerland: Removed. Monument will be marked on original site.
- Terra - The Sustainability: Became a children's and science centre.
- Thailand: Removed. Monument will be marked on original site.
- Turkmenistan: Remained the same.
- Tuvalu: Became the Stories Of Nation's - Mobility
- Ukraine: Removed. Monument will be marked on original site.
- United Arab Emirates: Became a cultural centre.
- United Kingdom: Removed. Monument will be marked on original site.
- United States: Removed. Monument will be marked on original site.
- Uruguay: Removed. Monument will be marked on original site.
- Uzbekistan: Removed. Monument will be marked on original site.
- Venezuela: Removed. Monument will be marked on original site.
- Vision Pavilion: Remained the same.
- Water Feature: Remained the same.
- Women's Pavilion: Remained the same.

== See also ==
- Expo 2020 (Dubai Metro)
