= Christopher Lee Nutter =

American writer & journalist (born 1970)

Christopher Lee Nutter (born May 2, 1970) is the author of The Way Out: The Gay Man’s Guide to Freedom, No Matter if You’re in Denial, Closeted, Half In, Half Out, Just Out, or Been Around the Block (HCI Press, May 2006), and co-author of Ignite the Genius Within (Penguin, March 2009). He is also a former magazine and newspaper journalist whose work appeared in The New York Times, The Village Voice, New York, Vibe, Time Out New York, Out, Publishers Weekly, Cargo, Lucky, and the Harvard Gay and Lesbian Review Worldwide. Nutter was the ghost writer for David LaChapelle's book Hotel LaChapelle (Callaway, 1999). He now runs a media consulting business in New York City handling the public relations for high-profile businesses such as Chermayeff & Geismar & Haviv and global arts projects such as Congo Tales as well as ghost-writing and doing creative project development for commercial artists.

== Biography ==
Nutter grew up in Birmingham, Alabama, and graduated from Vestavia Hills High School in 1988 and from Millsaps College in Jackson, Mississippi, in 1993.

== Journalism career ==
Nutter first achieved notoriety for an essay he wrote for Details magazine in 1994 about life inside the closet. He moved to New York shortly afterwards to become a trend writer for publications such as The Village Voice (where he wrote for founding editor Richard Goldstein), Vibe, New York Magazine, The New York Times, and The Advocate.

He also wrote the popular nightlife column Night Watch for HX (magazine in the late 1990s), and was a regular on the Manhattan and Miami Beach gay party scene as a bartender, doorman, and party boy.

== Metrosexual / Post-Straight / The Village Voice ==
Nutter went on to become the first writer to report on the influence of gay culture on straight men in a 2001 piece for The Village Voice called "Post-Straight, How Gay Men Are Remodeling Regular Guys", predicting the Metrosexual trend and Queer Eye For The Straight Guy, both of which appeared two years later. In 2003, he starred in VH-1's Totally Gay! to discuss the cultural history behind this trend. Writing for Goldstein Nutter also became the first writer to report on downtown Manhattan gay men moving to Harlem in a 2000 piece titled "Home Boys", and the first writer to do an exposé of gay men who work in the rap music business in a 2001 piece called "Fronting For The Enemy: Gay Men Who Make Homophobic Rappers Look Good".

== Published books ==
In 2006 Nutter published The Way Out on HCI Press, which was endorsed by GLAAD and Seat of the Soul author Gary Zukav.

In March, 2009 his multi-media creativity workbook, Ignite The Genius Within, co-authored with EMDR therapist Dr. Christine Ranck, was published by Penguin/Dutton. The book was endorsed by Laurie Anderson and Sarah Jones (stage actress).

== Nutter Media ==
In 2008 Nutter started a New York-based media consulting business handling the public relations for high-profile businesses such as Chermayeff & Geismar & Haviv (which designed the logos for Chase bank, NBC, PBS, Mobil Oil and Showtime) and the multi-media series Congo Tales, which appeared on the front page of The New York Times International Edition.

== Public High Line opposition ==
Beginning in 2012, Nutter became a vocal opponent of the High Line's effect on Chelsea's commercial and gay life by writing the first op-ed on the subject – "When Kansas Invaded Oz: An Enemy Of The High Line Speaks Out"—which was published in the Huffington Post. He has also given television interviews on the subject, and written related stories for the Huffington Post about Chelsea's commercial and cultural life vanishing as a result of the 4 million tourists a year who descend on the neighborhood. Nutter has done gratis PR work for extant Chelsea local businesses.

== Attention High Line Tourists media virus ==
In 2012 Nutter planted a story on Vanishing New York about an anonymous Chelsea resident who had put up flyers in the West 20s asking High Line tourists to use manners. The flyer—which was titled "Attention High Line Tourists: West Chelsea is not Times Square"—contained talking points about the number of tourists in the neighborhood – at that time 3 million a year – and how they were treating the neighborhood itself like a tourist attraction and destroying quality of life for residents.

The story was picked up from Vanishing New York, and over the next few weeks the news of the flyers was reported and re-reported on in citywide media, followed by national and then international media, including Fox News, CBS, New York magazine, the New York Post, Curbed, Gothamist, The Village Voice, Time, MSN.com, NY1, the Atlantic Monthly, and The Wall Street Journal. The story was re-reported, shared and commented on by countless social media channels as well as on personal blogs and blogs covering tourism, “gentrification” and, generally, New York City. Photos as well as quotes and full-on excerpts of the flyers—including a complete excerpt in Time magazine—made it into the above-mentioned traditional media, new media and social media coverage, making it one of the biggest viral media stories of 2012.

The virus permanently changed the conversation in the media about the High Line by forcing the media to report on the destructive effect of tourism on the surrounding neighborhood. The media storm inspired an op-ed in the Times about tourism's effect on Chelsea which quoted the flyers, eventually pushing Friends of the High Line's PR department to acknowledge the influx of tourists into Chelsea for the very first time since the High Line opened in 2009.

== Articles by Nutter ==
- Op Ed in the Huffington Post, When Kansas Invaded Oz: An Enemy of the High Line Speaks Out
- The New York Times, The Party's on the Best Sidewalks of New York
- Publishers Weekly Essay Author, Media Savant
- The Village Voice: Post-Straight:How Gay Men Are Remodeling Regular Guys
- The Village Voice: Fronting for the Enemy:Gay Men Who Make Homophobic Rappers Look Good
- The Village Voice: A Gay Community Grows in Harlem
- New York Magazine: How the buzz machine prepares a club for takeoff: a step-by-step guide.
- New York Magazine: Capoeira's secret battle plan for total gym domination
- Post-Straight: The Gay Liberation of the Straight American Male in the Harvard Gay and Lesbian Review
- Huffington Post: How Martial Vivot Became The Most Famous Men's Hair Stylist In The World: A PR And Social Media Case Study
