= Pieter Henket =

Dutch photographer

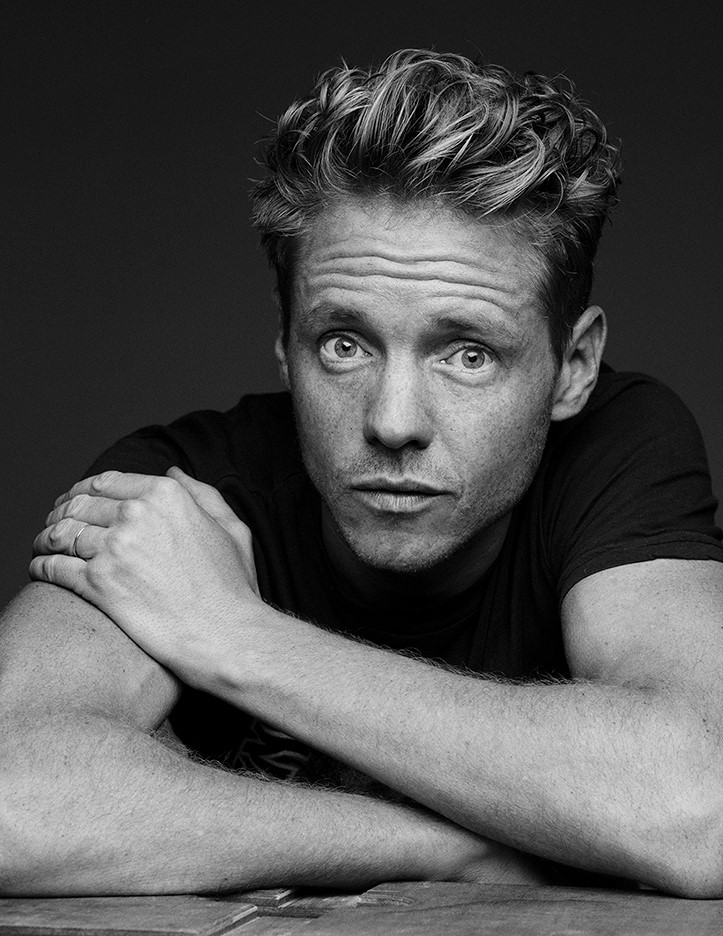
- Henket in 2019
- Born: 1979 (age 46–47); Geldrop, Netherlands
- Occupation: Photographer

Pieter Henket (born January 21, 1979) is a Dutch photographer living and working in New York City. His notable work includes shooting the cover of Lady Gaga’s debut album The Fame, and photographing National Congolese acting out their mythologies in the Congo rainforest for the book Congo Tales published by Prestel Publishing in 2018. He is known for a photographic style that takes inspiration from the 17th century Dutch Golden Age of painting.

== Life and career ==
Henket was born in Geldrop, Netherlands. He is the son of the Dutch architect Hubert-Jan Henket and the nephew of the Dutch photographer Bertien van Manen. After high school in the Netherlands, Henket moved to the States to take a three-month film course at the New York Film Academy, followed by a documentary-film-making course at the NYU film school. Shortly after, Henket got his start by interning for director Joel Schumacher.

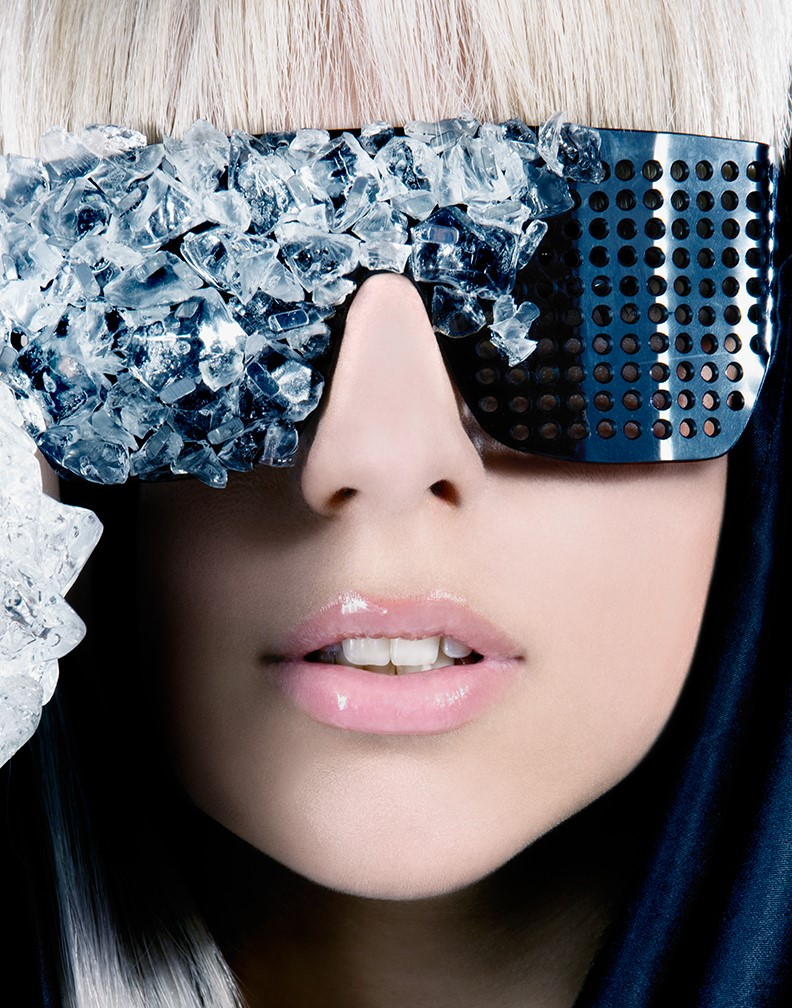
Pieter Henket's cover shot of Lady Gaga’s debut album The Fame

In 1999, he worked on the set of the film Flawless, starring Robert De Niro and Philip Seymour Hoffman. He had a long-time collaboration with recording artist and producer Ryan Leslie. He has worked with celebrities such as Anjelica Huston, Mary-Kate Olsen, Sir Ben Kingsley, Kristen Stewart and Lady Gaga for whose debut album The Fame Henket shot. In 2010, the iconic image was presented at the American Woman exhibition at the Metropolitan Museum of Art in New York.

== Congo Tales ==
In 2015 Henket was commissioned by Tales of Us in Berlin to photograph Congolese from the Mbomo District acting out their mythologies in the Odzala Kokoua National Park. for the book Congo Tales. It was published by Prestel Publishing (a division of Random House) in the United States on November 15, 2018, and in the UK on July 9th, 2018 (ISBN 978-3-7913-5789-8).

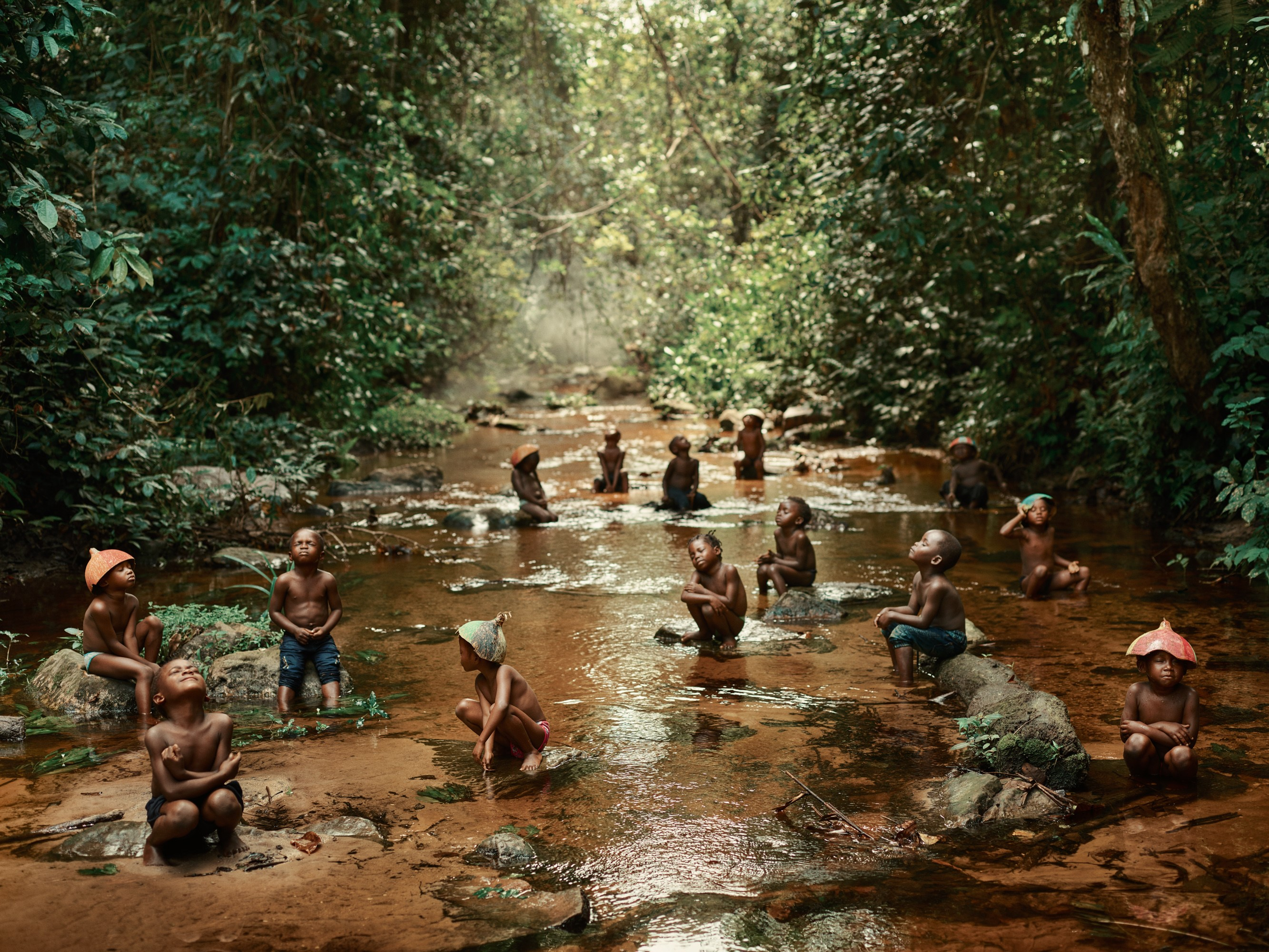
Photograph taken in the Odzala Kokoua National Park by Pieter Henket, and published in the book Congo Tales

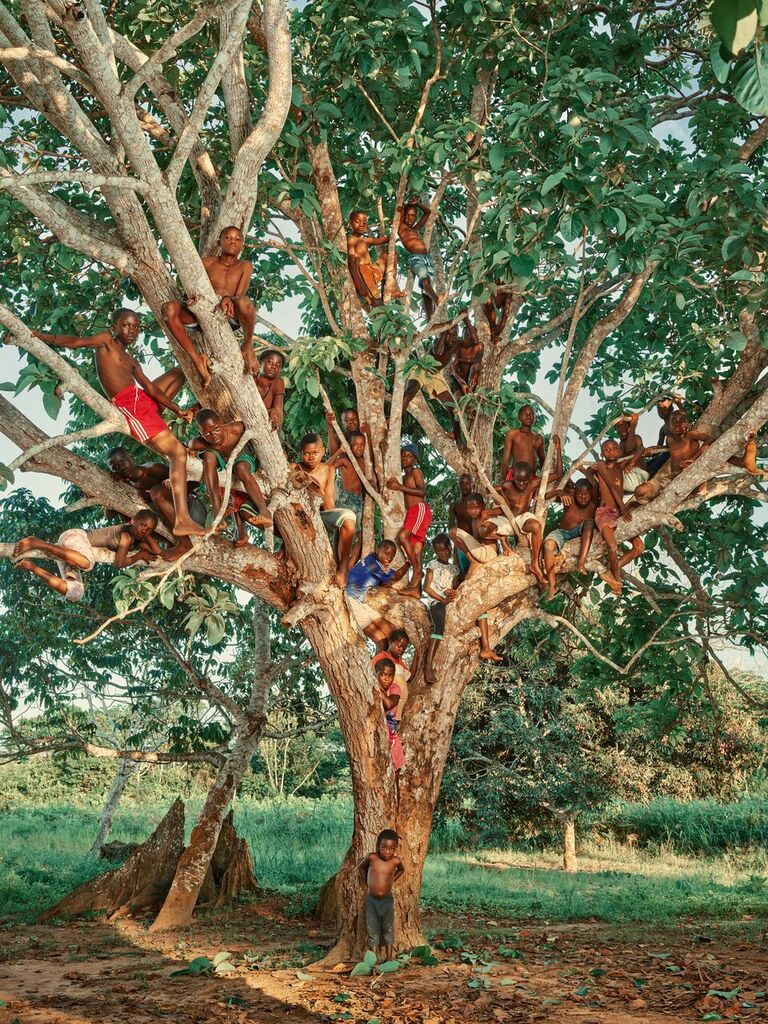
Photograph taken in the Odzala Kokoua National Park by Pieter Henket, and published in the book Congo Tales

== Exhibitions ==
- 2019, exhibition Congo Tales Museum de Fundatie, Zwolle, The Netherlands
- 2018, exhibition, Congo Tales, Museum Barberini, Potsdam, Germany
- 2016, exhibition 'Dutch Identity' about Dutch portrait photography, at Museum de Fundatie, Zwolle, Netherlands
- 2013, Solo opening exhibition, "The Way I See It" at Museum De Fundatie, Zwolle, Netherlands
- 2011, MTV RE:DEFINE’ at the Goss‐Michael Foundation in Dallas
- 2011, Exhibited at the Netherlands Film Festival in Stadsschouwburg
- 2010, Piece presented in the "American Woman" exhibition at the Metropolitan Museum of Art in New York
- 2010, "Fantastic Photography" exhibit at the Noorderlicht Photo Gallery in Groningen

== Publications ==
- "Congo Tales" (Random House / Prestel, 2018)
- "Stars to the Sun" (Lannoo Publishers/Racine, 2014)
- "The Way I See It" (Uitgeverij De Kunst, 2013)
