= The Way Out =

The Way Out may refer to:

== Film ==
- The Way Out (1915 film), an American silent drama
- The Way Out (1918 film), an American drama film made by World Film Company
- The Way Out (1955 film), also called Dial 999
- The Way Out (2014 film), a Czech-French film
- The Way Out (2015 film), a German-Russian short film

== Literature ==
- The Way Out (book), a 2006 self-help book for gay men by Christopher Lee Nutter
- The Way Out, a 1946 World War II memoir by Uys Krige about a prison escape
- The Way Out, a 1933 novel by Upton Sinclair
- Vägen ut ('The Way Out'), a 1936 novel by Harry Martinson

== Music ==
- The Way Out (The Books album), 2010
- The Way Out (Drag album), 2005
- The Way Out, a 2019 EP by Hayley Orrantia
- The Way Out, a 1990s Britpop band who created the theme for This Life

== Television ==
- "The Way Out" (Outlander), a TV episode
- "The Way Out" (Tales of the Empire), a TV episode

== See also ==
- A Way Out, a 2018 video game
- A Way Out (TV series)
