= Programme for People and Planet =

Exposition programme in Dubai, United Arab Emirates

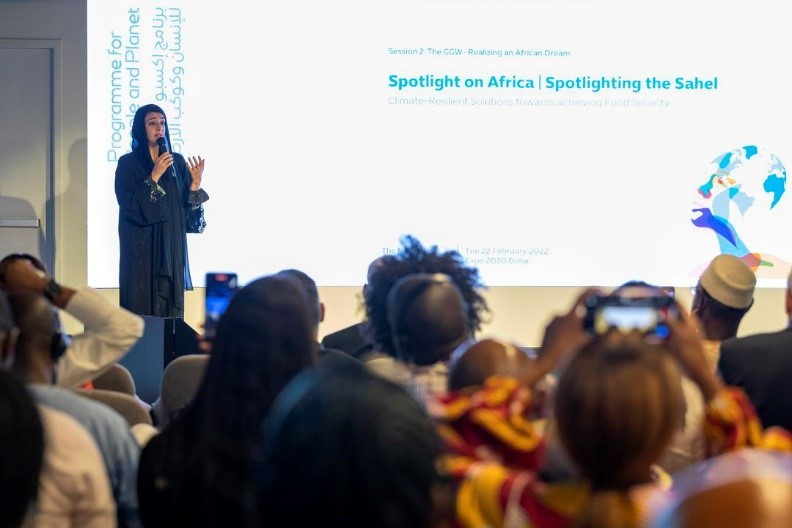
- Her Excellency Reem Al Hashimy, UAE Minister of State for International Cooperation and Director General of Expo 2020 Dubai, speaking at a Programme for People and Planet event.
- Date: 1 October 2021 to 31 March 2022
- Duration: 6 months
- Venue: Expo City, Dubai, United Arab Emirates
- Location: Dubai, United Arab Emirates
- Also known as: PPP
- Participants: 19,219 (in person) >29,000,000 (virtual)

The Programme for People and Planet (abbreviated as PPP) is a programme of events that was inaugurated at Expo 2020 Dubai and took place throughout a six-month period between October 2021 and March 2022. It was endorsed and adopted by the Cabinet of the United Arab Emirates in April 2021 and has received support from various United Nations agencies and offices. The Programme focused on areas such as social development, culture, economics, environmental issues, gender rights, and futurist topics, among others.

== Background ==
The Programme was part of Expo 2020 Dubai (Arabic: إكسبو 2020), a World Expo hosted by Dubai, United Arab Emirates from 1 October 2021 to 31 March 2022. The event recorded more than 24 million visits in its six months.

== Vision ==
The Programme for People and Planet was designed to address the many challenges the world faces today, by deploying the convening power of World Expos and the UAE to galvanise collective and meaningful action.

The Programme provided a platform for open dialogue and the exchange of new ideas, designed to help reimagine the global economy; place equality, universal respect and human dignity at the centre of human progress; and instill a sense of responsibility to live in harmony and balance with the natural world.

== History ==
Expo 2020's Programme for People and Planet was revealed in August 2021. The previous year, the Programme ran 10 virtual pre-Expo talks with the participation from various countries and international organisations.

During event time, the Programme for People and Planet delivered 229 events featuring speakers from 142 countries. It had over 19,219 participants in person and over 29 million virtual viewers, including 1.2 million visits on the Virtual Expo platform only. The event series were held during 10 Theme Weeks and 15 International Days. On 29 March 2022, the Programme culminated in the Walk for People and Planet, a three-kilometre walk attended by over 3,000 people.

Across the six months, the Programme for People and Planet had participation and endorsement from various world leaders, including Amina J. Mohammed, Helen Clark, and Bill Gates, as well as artists such as Coldplay.

== Programme structure ==
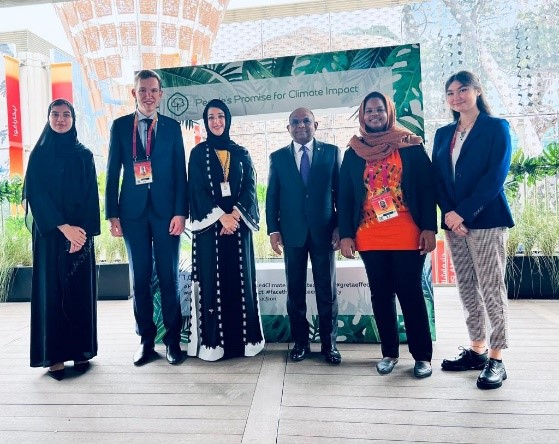
Participants in the Programme for People and Planet's Climate and Biodiversity week flagship event "The People's Promise for Climate Impact".

The Programme was organised around five key tracks – Build Bridges (cultural focus), Leave No One Behind (social development focus), Live in Balance (sustainability focus), Thrive Together (economic focus), and UAE Vision 2071. The Vision 2071 track focused on the UAE's long-term plans for its future. Each track was integrated by different series of events including Cultures in Conversation, Business Forums, World Majlis, Women's Pavilion Programme, Dignified Storytelling, Expo Live and the Best Practice Area.

International days celebrated by the Programme included World Food Day, World Cities Day, International Day for Tolerance, World Children's Day, International Day of Persons with Disabilities, International Volunteer Day, Universal Health Coverage Day, UN Arabic Language Day, International Day of Education, International Day of Women and Girls in Science, World Wildlife Day, International Women's Day, International Day of Happiness, Mother's Day, and World Water Day.

Event series were held across 10 thematic weeks, which were:

- Climate & Biodiversity (3-9 October 2021)
- Space (17-23 October 2021)
- Urban & Rural Development (31 October-6 November 2021)
- Tolerance & Inclusivity (14-20 November 2021)
- Knowledge & Learning (12-18 December 2021)
- Travel & Connectivity (9-15 January 2022)
- Global Goals (15-22 January 2022)
- Health & Wellness (27 January-2 February 2022)
- Food Agriculture & Livelihoods (17-23 February 2022)
- Water (20-26 March 2022)

== Components ==
Cultures in Conversation

This programme spotlighted the wealth of cultural diversity at Expo, demonstrating that cultural practices and traditions frequently hold similarities across different countries and regions.

Sustainable Development Goals (SDG) Programme

This programme focused on localisation and implementation of Agenda 2030. Topics included scaling up and applying innovative approaches to service delivery, and different ways to empower last mile communities and households at risk of being left behind, so that they might fully benefit from and actively contribute to sustainable development.

Sustainability@Expo

This series spotlighted Expo's sustainability efforts as well as countries across the Expo site that demonstrated sustainability through their pavilion content, design, programming, and operations.

Thematic Business Forums

Highlighting non-traditional business opportunities, technologies and progress achieved by the UAE, the Dubai Chamber of Commerce and Industry (DCCI) collaborated with Expo 2020 Dubai in the delivery of these Forums (with the exception of TBF Tolerance & Inclusivity.

Global Business Forums

Expo 2020 Dubai, in partnership with Dubai Chamber, hosted three Global Business Forums (GBFs): Africa, Latin America, and, for the first time, ASEAN.

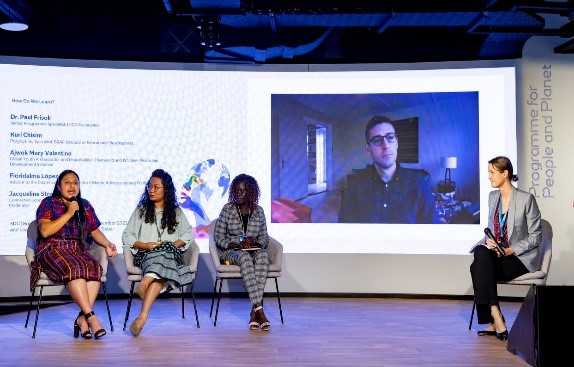
Panel of speakers in the Programme for People and Planet's Knowledge and Learning week flagship event "Bringing Knowledge and Learning to the World".

Best Practice Area

The Global Best Practice Programme – Small Steps Big Leaps: Solutions for Sustainable Impact – was a platform for showcasing simple yet impactful interventions that localised the UN SDGs. The programme spotlighted select projects, and highlighted the ways in which these solutions yielded positive impact. It culminated in a multifunctional exhibition and programming space, bringing together diverse stakeholders to share ideas on how different project components can be adapted, replicated and scaled globally. The Programme also carried out a special call for proposals for effective and successful initiatives for localising response and recovery in relation to COVID-19.

World Majlis

The World Majlis was Expo's signature platform for Connecting Minds, designed to spark exchanges that pave the way for a better future. In this way, these 53 World Majlis conversations, spanning the six months of the event, engaged visitors with diverse global issues.

Expo Live

Expo Live's programming series showcased the importance of social entrepreneurs in identifying grassroots approaches to global challenges, while catalysing opportunities for new partnerships. This series covered 14 sectors and 16 SDGs and was grouped under five categories: Women Igniting Change, Power of Determination, Next Gen Humans, Tech for Good, Man and Nature (in Live in Balance Series).

Expo Live also accelerated and promoted creative solutions that improve lives while preserving the world through the Innovation Impact Grant Programme and University Innovation Programme.

Women's Pavilion

Under the exhibition title New Perspectives, The Women's Pavilion focused on equality and prosperity for women. Women's Pavilion at Expo 2020 showed how peace, prosperity, and sustainability can be achieved through the equal and active participation of women.

Dignified Storytelling

Led by Expo 2020 Dubai and Dubai Cares, the Dignified Storytelling initiative aimed to create a storytelling ecosystem that upheld the dignity and respect of all persons and, in so doing, contributed to the UN SDGs.

== Outreach ==
Flip Your World View

Expo worked with Gapminder Foundation, a Sweden-based NGO specialising in dismantling misconceptions in order to promote a fact-based worldview. Flip Your Worldview was featured across Expo's Global Goals Week as a key component of the Build Bridges cultural track, and was spotlighted across countries' National Days.

Seeds of Change

Seeds of Change was a visitor engagement platform that both connected visitors with inspiring projects around the world, and guided Expo's carbon offset investment. Visitors contributed by nominating a certified carbon offset project within their country or International Organisation that has both social and environmental benefits. There was no cost incurred on the visitor's part by nominating a project.

Plastics Pledge

Expo invited countries to sign the Plastics Pledge and minimise the impact of single-use plastics during Expo 2020.

People and Planet Podcast Series

A podcast that brought in changemakers from all over the world to break down what it will take to create a sustainable future for the planet. This podcast was inspired by the Programme for People and Planet, and produced by Kerning Cultures Network.

Children's Tales from around the World

A collection of stories chosen to help children aged 5 to 12 years explore various differences and shared values, broaden their world view, and gain a greater appreciation of their own heritage – as well as develop a love of reading. Many of the featured stories, contributed by some of Expo's 190-plus participating countries, have been passed down through generations.

EXPO 2020 B2B App

The Expo 2020 B2B App convened all Expo business stakeholders and visitors from around the world on a unique AI-powered platform, with the objective of facilitating impactful B2B, B2G and G2G connections. Anyone worldwide was able to download the app and use features such as networking, connecting, chatting and scheduling meetings.

Dignified Storytelling Handbook

The Dignified Storytelling Handbook is a resource to help storytellers and organisations promote and employ storytelling practices that are grounded in a deep respect for human dignity.

Change the World Challenge

An activation that started during Global Goals week and ran until the end of event time taking place across the entire Expo 2020 site to engage visitors with the UN SDGs. More than 80,000 visitors took part in the challenge over the course of its 10-week activation, with participants contributing 57,053 ‘to-do' notes in support of the SDGs, and close to 12,000 visitors completing the entire challenge.

== Outcomes ==
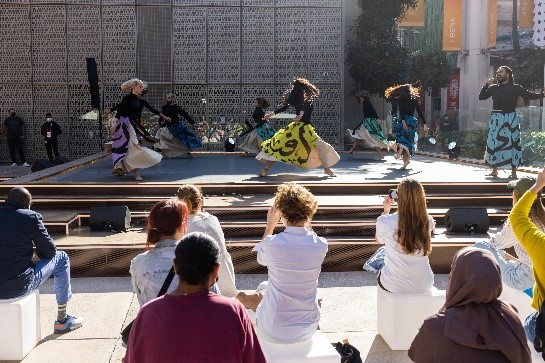
Cultures in Conversation event "The Wider the Vision, the Narrower the Phrase" during Global Goals week

Throughout its six months of programming, the Programme for People and Planet provided a platform that enabled partnerships and reinforced the world's commitments to address global issues. Several announcements, commitments and initiates were launched as part of the events hosted by the Programme.

During Climate and Biodiversity theme week, DP World announced a pledge to combat illegal wildlife trade by 2030. In addition, UNIMONT and Italy launched a policy paper entitled "Mountain Education and Innovation Manifesto" after the event "Reaching for the Stars: Sustainable and Climate Resilient Mountain Development", which was co-curated by Italy at Expo 2020 Dubai. The flagship event of the week "The People's Promise for Climate Impact" captured a video message of youth voices for climate action, which was presented at COP 26 in Glasgow as part of the UK Government Youth and Public Empowerment Showcase.

The Blue Marble Vision Framework for international cooperation within the space sector, championed by Sweden, was launched during Space week; and UN-Habitat launched their Roadmap for Last Mile Delivery during Urban and Rural Development week.

Smart Africa and the Estonian ICT Cluster announced the AgriTech pilot project during Travel & Connectivity week, and a Global Best Practice Programme Guide along with the Global Best Practice Programme: How to Scale-Up Innovative Solutions Guide were announced during Global Goals week. During the same theme week, the United Arab Emirates, Jordan, and the Netherlands issued a Tri-lateral declaration on the last day of the Water-Food-Energy Nexus event.

On World Food Day, the UAE Ministry of Climate Change and Environment (MOCCAE), the UAE Ministry of Health and Prevention (MOHAP), the Emirates Nature-WWF and FAO signed a letter of intent to promote a campaign on "Healthy Diets from Sustainable food Systems". In addition, the UAE-FAO agreement to support FAO's "Hand-in-Hand Initiative: Zimbabwe Project for Smallholder Horticulture Recovery & Inclusion" was also signed and the Credit Fund for the Sub-regional Coordinator for the GCC and Yemen was renewed.

Other international days' partners also made similar agreements and announcements. UNICEF for example announced two of their international advocates at Expo 2020 Dubai during the official ceremony for World Children's Day, where the first Emirati was selected for the role. Similarly, global Volunteer Heroes were announced on International Volunteer Day by the UAE Ministry of Community Development (MOCD).

The World Health Organization (WHO), a partner for Universal Health Coverage Day, launched the "Global monitoring report on financial protection in health 2021", and the "Tracking Universal Health Coverage: 2021 Global monitoring report" during this day's events at Expo 2020 Dubai. On World Wildlife Day, MOCCAE announced the launch of the UAE National Red List (an evaluation of extinction risk of more than 1,000 species in the UAE, including conservation plans and programmes for the species and their habitats).

== Participants ==
Participants at the Programme included:

16 in-association with partners

- Ministry of Climate Change and Environment
- DP World
- UAE Space Agency
- Mohammed Bin Rashid Space Centre
- UN Habitat
- Siemens
- Aga Khan Development Network
- Ministry of Tolerance and Coexistence
- Dubai Cares
- Etisalat
- Emirates
- United Nations
- World Health Organization
- Mohammed Bin Rashid University of Medicine and Health Sciences
- PepsiCo
- Ministry of Energy and Infrastructure

17 UAE partners (Ministries, UAE institutions)

- Abu Dhabi Fund for Development
- Dubai Cares
- Dubai Chamber
- Masdar
- Ministry of Climate Change and Environment
- Ministry of Community Development
- Ministry of Education
- Ministry of Energy and Infrastructure
- Ministry of Foreign Affairs and International Cooperation
- Ministry of Health and Prevention
- Ministry of Industry and Advanced Technology
- Ministry of Tolerance and Coexistence
- Mohammed Bin Rashid Space Centre
- Office of the UAE Special Envoy for Climate Change
- The Executive Council
- UAE Federal Youth Authority
- UAE Space Agency

20 UN Agencies and Offices

- FAO
- UN DSG's Office
- UN DGC
- UN Global Compact
- UN Habitat
- UN Volunteers
- UN-Water
- UN Women
- UN Youth Envoy's Office
- UNCCD
- UNDESA
- UNDP
- UNDRR
- UNEP
- UNESCO
- UNHCR
- UNICEF
- UNOOSA
- WFP
- WHO

22 Commercial Partners

- Accenture
- Canon
- Christie
- Dettol
- DEWA
- DP World
- Dubai Chamber
- Dulsco
- Emirates
- Emirates NBD
- Etisalat
- G42
- Jacobs
- L'Oréal
- Mace
- Mastercard
- Nissan
- PepsiCo
- SAP
- Siemens
- Terminus
- UPS

== Countries ==
142 countries were represented at the Programme:

Africa

Benin, Botswana, Brunei, Burkina Faso, Burundi, Cameroon, Chad, Comoros, Democratic Republic of the Congo, Cote d'Ivoire, Djibouti, Ethiopia, Gabon, Gambia, Ghana, Guinea, Kenya, Lesotho, Malawi, Maldives, Mali, Mauritania, Mauritius, Mozambique, Namibia, Niger, Nigeria, Rwanda, Senegal, Seychelles, Sierra Leone, South Africa, South Sudan, Sudan, Tanzania, Togo, Uganda, Zambia, Zimbabwe

Asia

Afghanistan, Azerbaijan, Bangladesh, Bhutan, Cambodia, China, India, Indonesia, Japan, South Korea, Kyrgyzstan, Malaysia, Myanmar, Nepal, Pakistan, Philippines, Singapore, Sri Lanka, Tajikistan, Thailand, Vietnam

Europe

Andorra, Armenia, Austria, Belgium, Bulgaria, Croatia, Cyprus, Denmark, Estonia, Finland, France, Germany, Greece, Greenland, Hungary, Ireland, Italy, Latvia, Lithuania, Luxembourg, Netherlands, North Macedonia, Norway, Poland, Portugal, Romania, Russia, Serbia, Slovakia, Slovenia, Spain, Sweden, Switzerland, Ukraine, United Kingdom

Latin America and the Caribbean

Antigua and Barbuda, Argentina, Bahamas, Belize, Brazil, Chile, Colombia, Costa Rica, Cuba, Ecuador, Guatemala, Haiti, Jamaica, Mexico, Panama, Paraguay, Peru, Saint Lucia, Saint Vincent and the Grenadines, Trinidad and Tobago, Uruguay, Venezuela

MENA

Algeria, Bahrain, Egypt, Iran, Iraq, Israel, Jordan, Kuwait, Lebanon, Libya, Morocco, Oman, Palestine, Saudi Arabia, Syria, Tunisia, Turkey, United Arab Emirates, Yemen

North America

Canada, United States

Oceania

Australia, Fiji, Marshall Islands, New Zealand
