= Ignite the Genius Within =

2009 book by Nutter and Ranck

Ignite the Genius Within: Discover Your Full Potential
- Author: Christopher Lee Nutter, Dr. Christine Ranck
- Language: English
- Genre: Psychology
- Publication date: March 2009
- ISBN: 052595094X

Ignite the Genius Within: Discover Your Full Potential is a multi-media creativity book co-authored by author and journalist Christopher Lee Nutter and EMDR therapist Dr. Christine Ranck. It was published by Dutton Penguin in March, 2009 (ISBN 052595094X). The book uses visuals with audio stimulus created by Dr. David Grand derived from EMDR trauma therapy to the end of enhancing creativity. It was endorsed by performance artist Laurie Anderson and actress / playwright Sarah Jones (stage actress).
