= Victor Ai =

Chinese businessman

- Born: 1983
- Education: Simon Fraser University; Washington University in St. Louis
- Occupations: Businessman, investor
- Title: CEO of Terminus Group

Victor Ai (Chinese: 艾渝; born 1983), also known as Ai Yu, is a Chinese businessman and investor. He is the founder and CEO of Terminus Group. He launched the AI City project, named Cloud Valley, which is controlled by artificial intelligence.

Prior to founding Terminus, Ai was head of Everbright's New Economy Fund, where he served as its partner. He worked for more than 10 years in the field of new economy investments. He led investments into start-ups including NetEase Cloud Music, SenseTime, Meituan-Dianping, Xpeng, NIO, iQiyi, and Nreal.

Earlier in his career, Ai worked in the mergers and acquisitions department of global investment banking at JPMorgan Chase, where he was an investment banker.

== Education and career ==
Ai earned a Bachelor of Arts in Economics from Simon Fraser University and a Master of Science degree in Finance from Washington University in St. Louis.

In 2015, Ai founded Terminus. In June 2016, Everbright and IDG Capital jointly set up Everbright-IDG Industrial Fund, where he worked as its managing partner.

In November 2019, Ai attended the Fortune Global Tech Forum, where he was one of the speakers. In November 2021, he took part in the China Annual Conference of the Harvard Business Review.
