= Mbomo District =

Coordinates: 0°31′N 14°46′E

Mbomo
- District
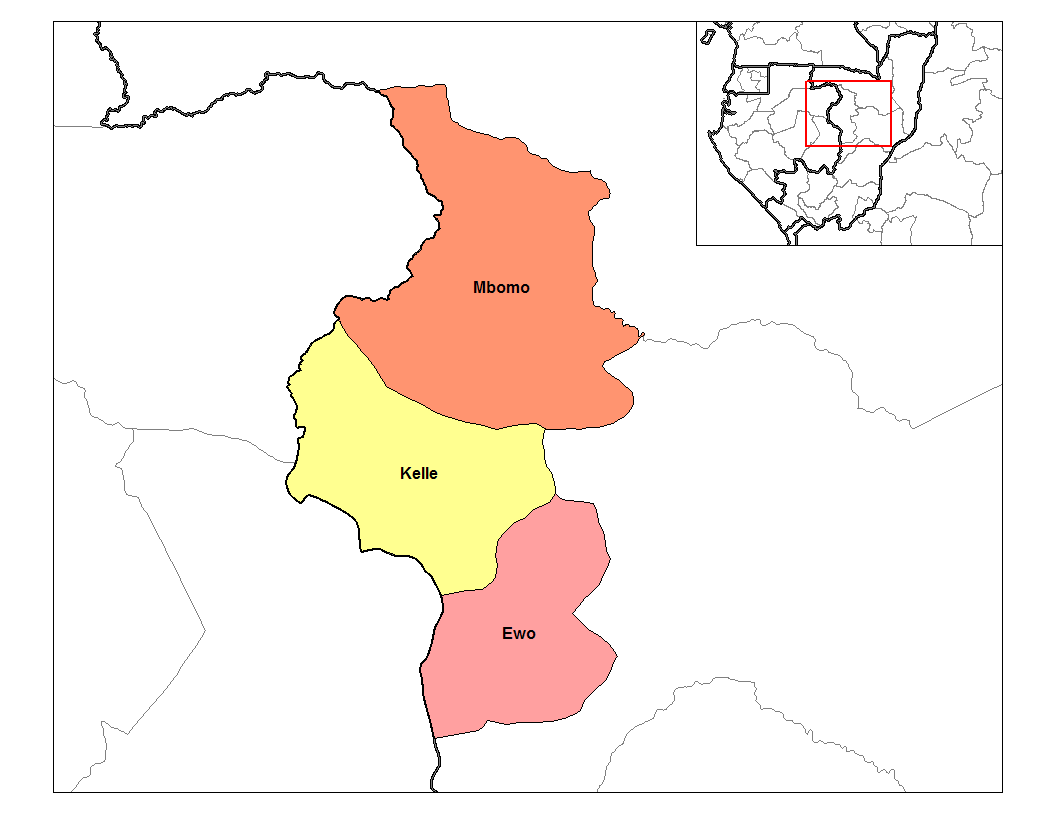
- Mbomo District in the region
- Country: Republic of the Congo
- Region: Cuvette-Ouest Region

Area
  - Total: 4,296 sq mi (11,126 km^{2})

Population (2023 census)
  - Total: 13,197
  - Density: 3.0721/sq mi (1.1861/km^{2})
- Time zone: UTC+1 (GMT +1)

Mbomo is a district in the Cuvette-Ouest Region of western Republic of the Congo. The capital lies at Mbomo.

== See also ==
- Congo Tales – a photo series book of Congolese from the Mbomo District
