= The Way Out (book) =

2006 book by Christopher Lee Nutter

- Author: Christopher Lee Nutter
- Language: English
- Genre: Self-help; Memoir
- Publisher: HCI Press
- Publication date: May 2006
- Publication place: United States
- ISBN: 0-7573-0392-7

The Way Out: The Gay Man's Guide to Freedom, No Matter if You're in Denial, Closeted, Half In, Half Out, Just Out, or Been Around the Block (ISBN 0-7573-0392-7) is a self-help book for gay men. It was written by Christopher Lee Nutter, a journalist living in New York City. The book is a memoir of the life of a gay man who grew up in the American South and later moved to New York City. It presents a guide to finding happiness and freedom while living as a gay man. The Way Out was published by HCI press in May 2006.
