= Congo Tales =

Photo series book of Congolese

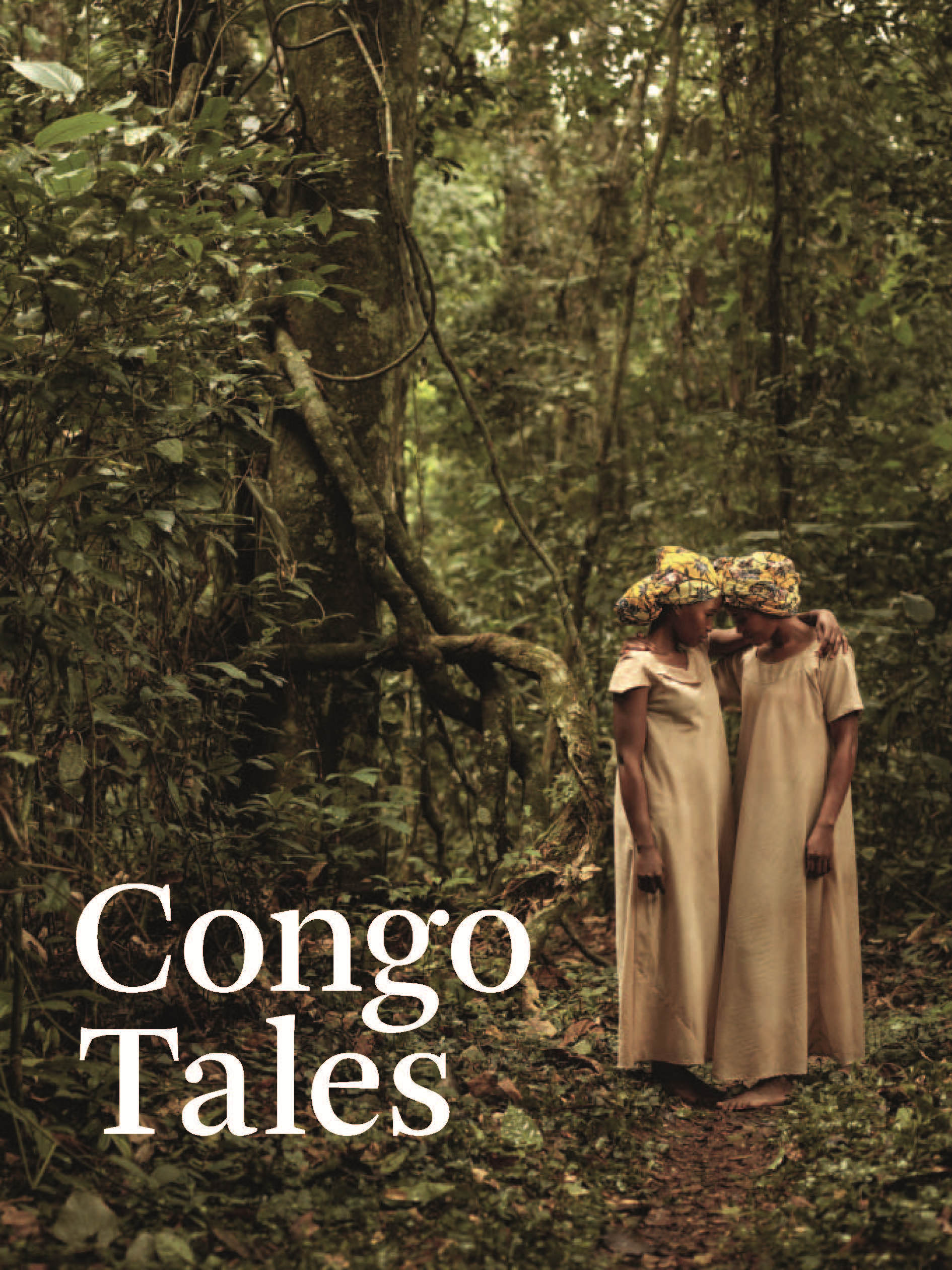
- Publisher: Prestel Publishing
- Publication date: 2018
- ISBN: 978-3-7913-5789-8

Congo Tales is a photo series book of Congolese from the Mbomo District acting out their mythologies in the Odzala Kokoua National Park. It was published by Prestel Publishing (a division of Random House) in the United States on November 15, 2018, and in the UK on July 9, 2018 (ISBN 978-3-7913-5789-8).

The book was photographed by Pieter Henket, and it was edited by Eva Vonk and Stefanie Plattner of Tales of Us in Berlin. The Congolese mythology in the book was adapted by Congolese philosopher S. R. Kovo N'Sondé and author Wilfried N'Sondé. Congo Tales is the first in a series of productions by Tales of Us. The project includes a short film directed by Stefanie Plattner based on one of the Congolese myths in the book called The Little Fish and the Crocodile. The third project from Tales of Us is Tales@Home, a free online education program that introduces children to ecological wonderlands—and the culture of the people who live there—from around the globe. The first installment -- Akesi and the Congo River—is based on Congo Tales.

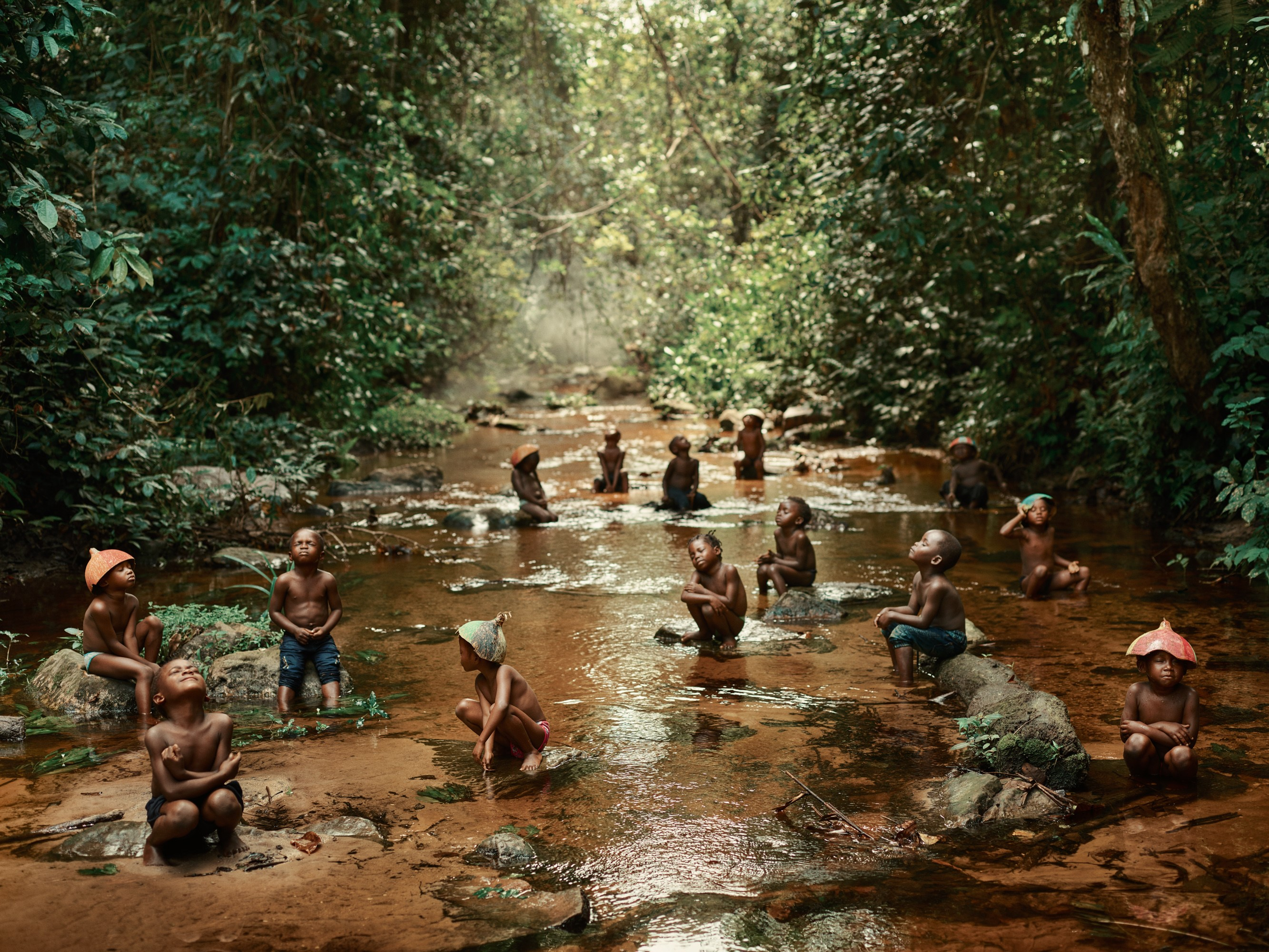
Photograph taken in the Odzala Kokoua National Park by Pieter Henket, and published in the book Congo Tales.

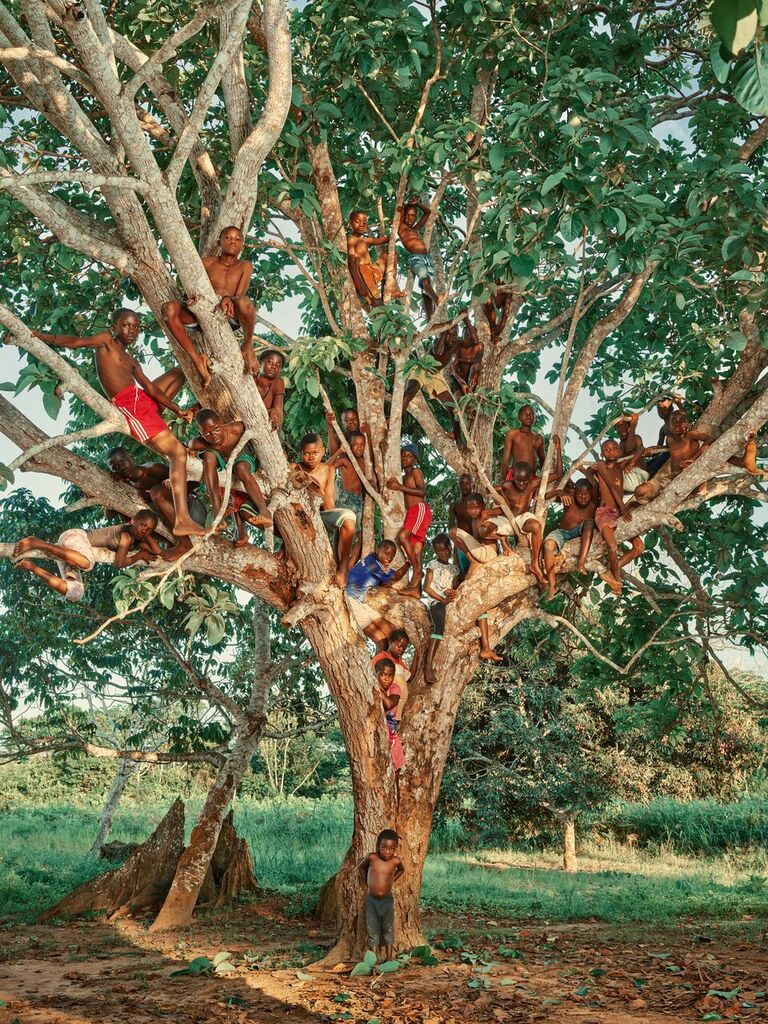
Photograph taken in the Odzala Kokoua National Park by Pieter Henket, and published in the book Congo Tales.

== Tales of Us ==
Tales Of Us is an ongoing multimedia series that offers a new approach to communicating the urgency of protecting the world's most powerful and fragile ecosystems and the people who call them home. Congo Tales and The Little Fish and the Crocodile are its first such projects.

== The Little Fish and the Crocodile ==
The project includes a short film based on one of the Congolese myths in the book called The Little Fish and the Crocodile. The film was directed by Stefanie Plattner and produced by Eva Vonk. It won at several major film festivals, including Best Live Action Short at the 35th Chicago International Children's Film Festival.

== Tales@Home ==
Tales of Us' follow up project is Tales@Home, a free online education program that introduces children to ecological wonderlands -- and the culture of the people who live there -- from around the globe. The first installment -- Akesi and the Congo River -- is based on Congo Tales.

== Exhibitions ==
- 2019, exhibition, Congo Tales, Museum de Fundatie, Zwolle, Netherlands
- 2018, exhibition, Congo Tales, Museum Barberini, Potsdam, Germany
