= Dubai Chambers =

Non-profit organisation serving businesses in Dubai

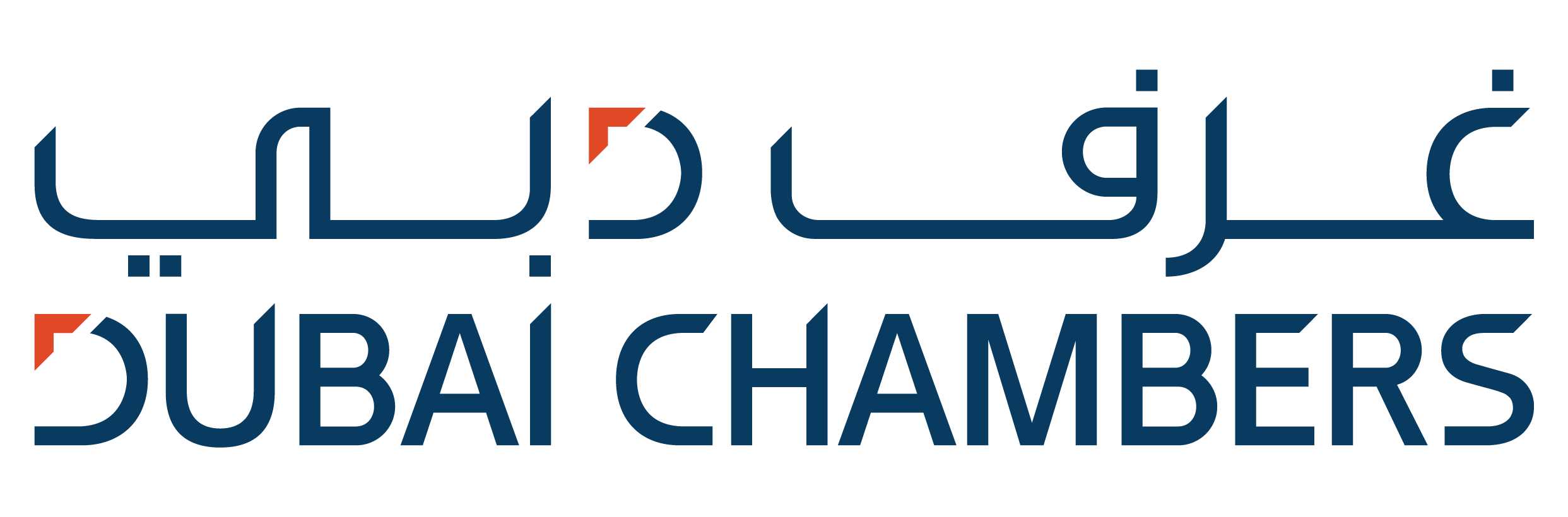
- Formation: 1965
- Legal status: Non-profit semi-government organisation
- Headquarters: Dubai, United Arab Emirates
- Location: 33 international offices
- Services: Certificate of Origin (COO) Issuance, ATA Carnet Issuance, Attestation Services, Mediation Services, Venue Booking, Global Partnership Programme, Business in Dubai, Expand North Star and Digital Industry Workshops
- Fields: Business Community
- President & CEO: Mohammad Ali Rashed Lootah
- Website: www.dubaichambers.com

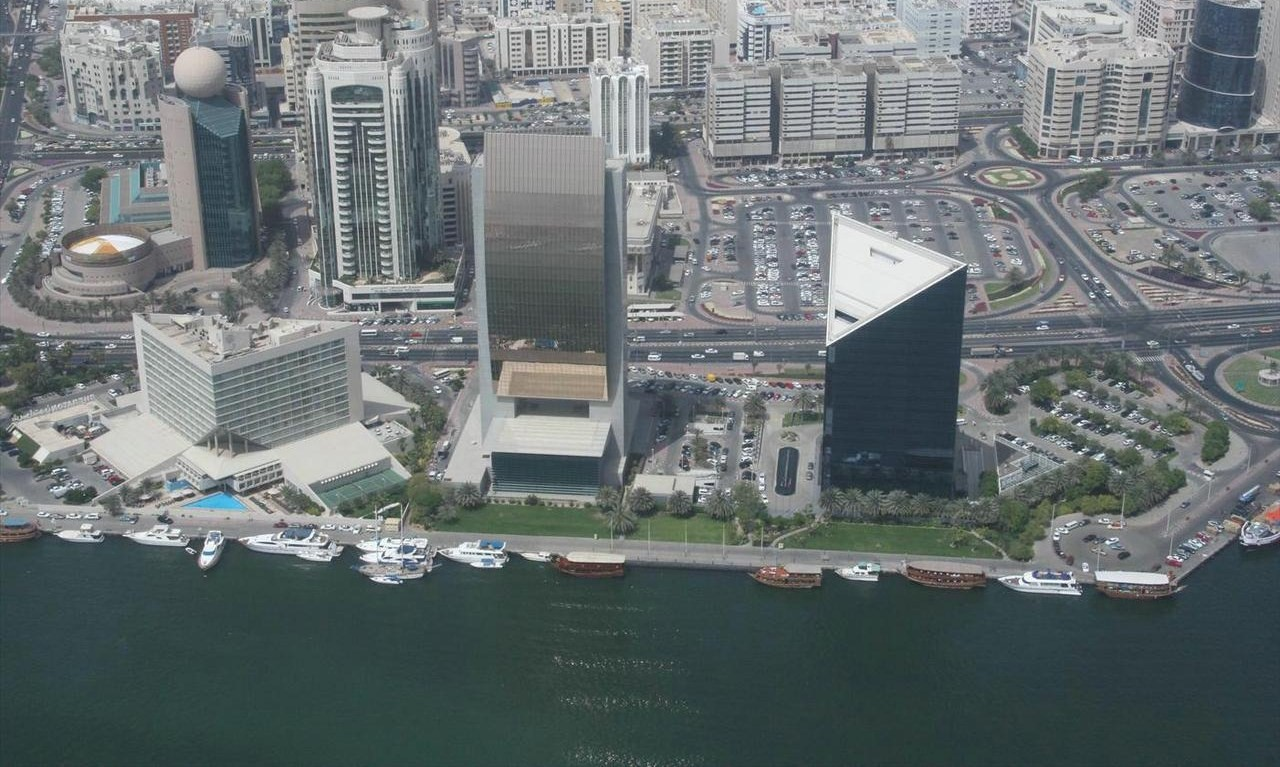

Dubai Chambers is a non-profit public organisation based in Dubai, United Arab Emirates. It comprises three entities: Dubai Chamber of Commerce, Dubai International Chamber and Dubai Chamber of Digital Economy. The three chambers focus on business representation, international trade and investment relations, and the digital economy. Their activities are aligned with the Dubai Economic Agenda (D33).

== History ==
Dubai Chambers traces its origins to the Dubai Chamber of Commerce and Industry, established in 1965.

In 2021, Mohammed bin Rashid Al Maktoum approved the restructuring of the chamber into the Dubai Chamber of Commerce, Dubai Chamber of Digital Economy, and Dubai International Chamber. A central board was established to coordinate their activities. Law No. 1 of 2022 formally established Dubai Chambers as a public non-profit organisation. The organisation introduced a new corporate identity in April 2022 following the restructuring.

== Structure ==
Dubai Chambers comprises three chambers, each with its own board of directors and area of responsibility:

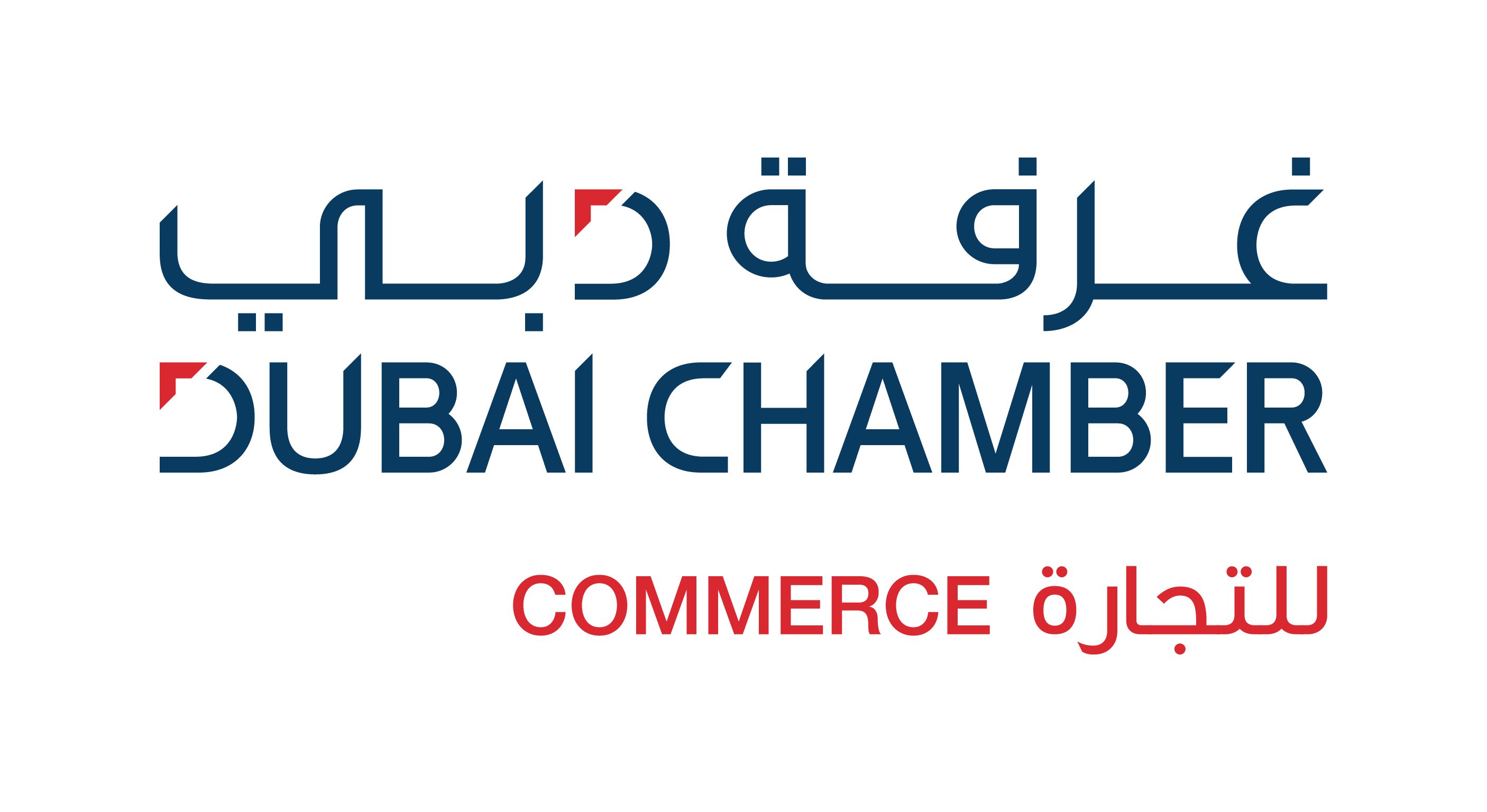
Dubai Chamber of Commerce

- Dubai Chamber of Commerce

Dubai Chamber of Commerce represents businesses operating in Dubai and provides services including certificates of origin and document authentication. Its work also includes business representation and engagement with public authorities. The chamber provides information and contacts for companies exploring international markets, and oversees industry-based Business Groups and country-based Business Councils, which serve as forums for exchanges between businesses and government entities.

In 2004, the chamber established its Centre for Responsible Business, which runs programmes related to corporate responsibility and sustainability, including the Dubai Chamber of Commerce ESG Label, introduced in August 2024 to assess participating organisations against environmental, social and governance criteria.

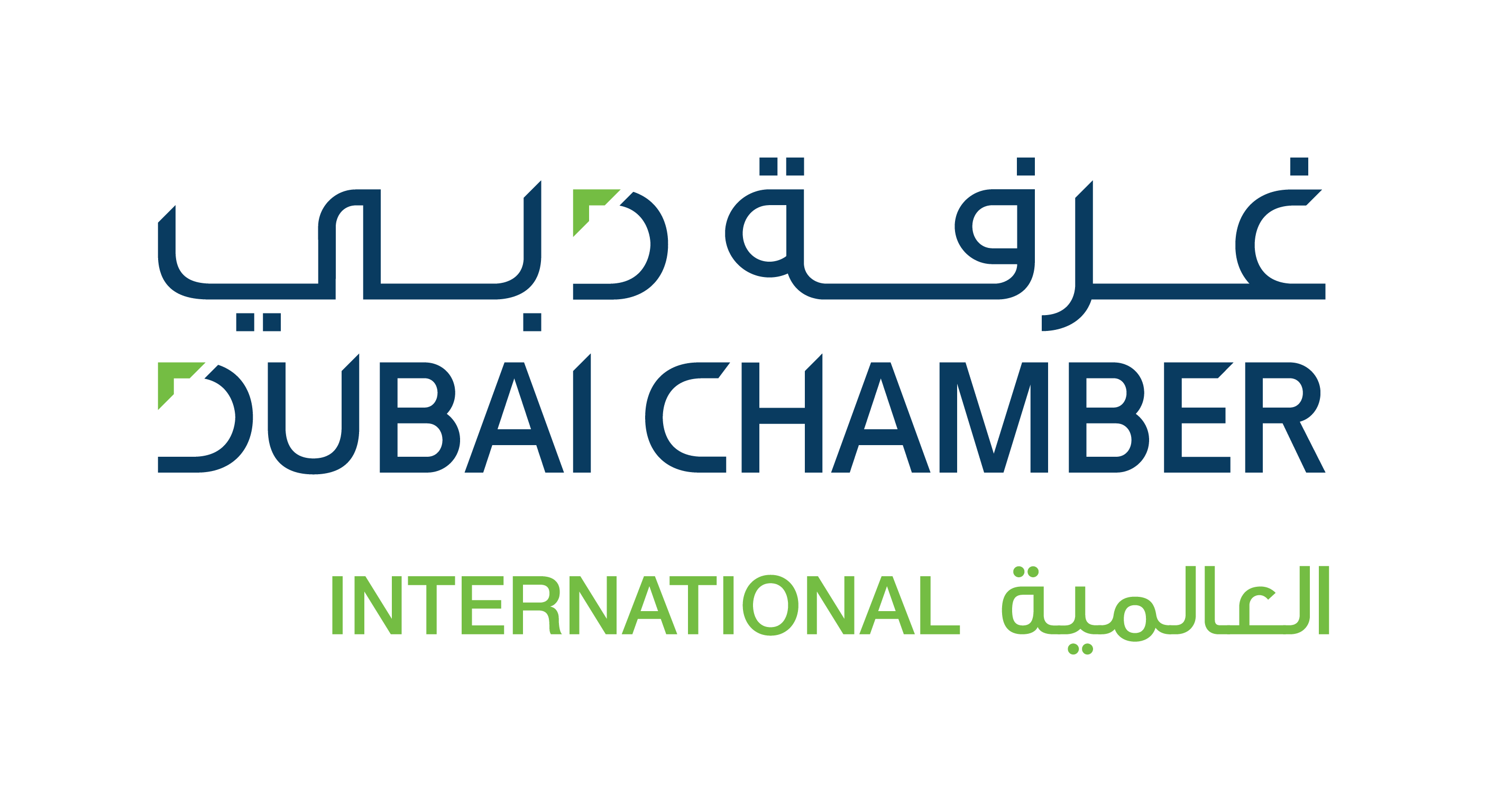
Dubai International Chamber

- Dubai International Chamber

Dubai International Chamber works with foreign companies seeking to establish operations in Dubai and promotes business relations between Dubai and overseas markets. By the end of 2025, Dubai International Chamber operated 38 representative offices across five continents. The offices provide information on local markets and connect businesses with potential partners.

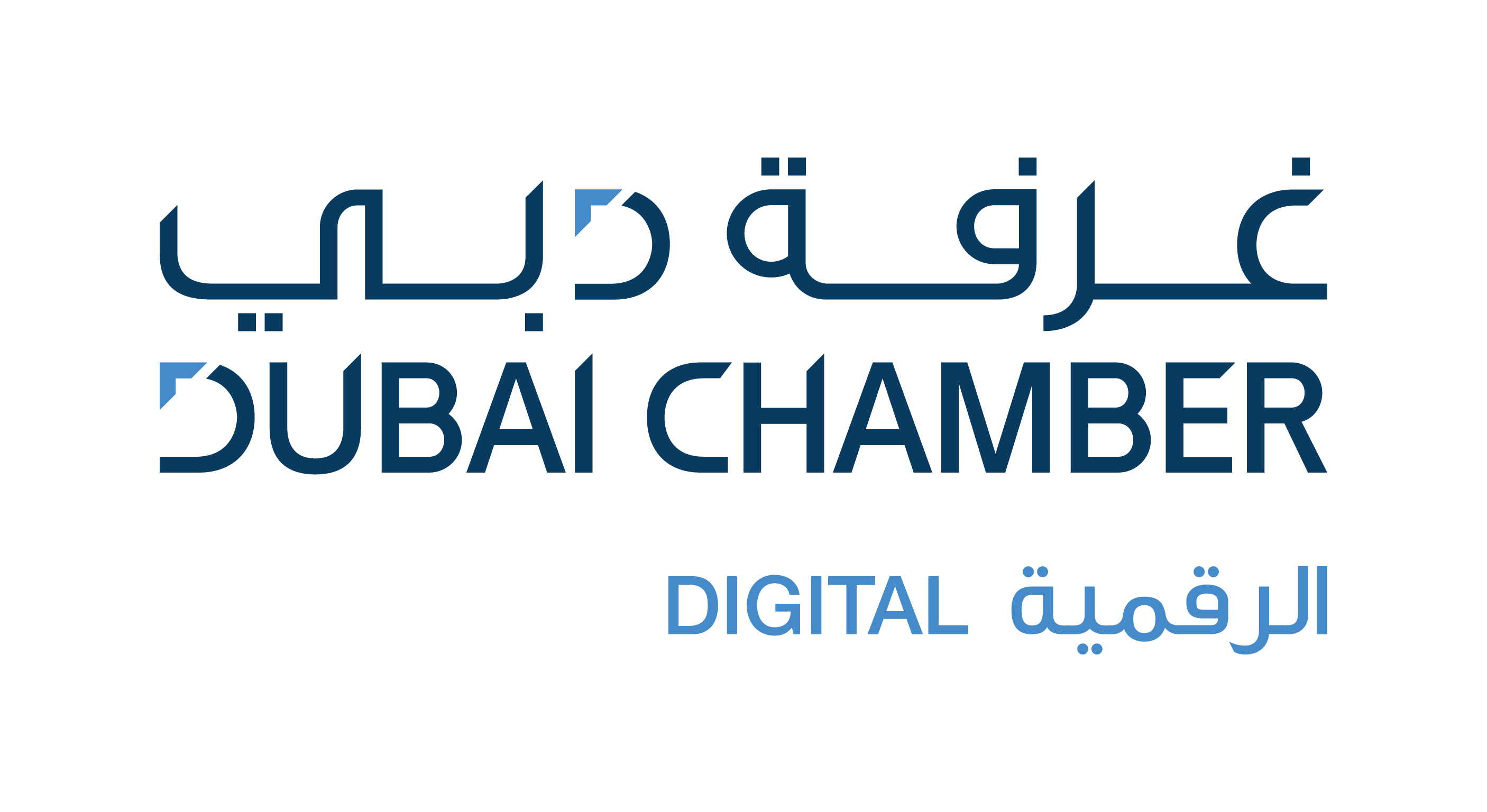
Dubai Chamber of Digital Economy

- Dubai Chamber of Digital Economy

Dubai Chamber of Digital Economy engages with technology companies, startups and investors. Its activities include research and discussions on digital economy policy.

In 2023, it launched the Create Apps in Dubai initiative, which provides training in mobile application development and support for digital businesses.

- Agentic AI Initiative

In May 2026, Dubai Chambers was assigned responsibility for a two-year initiative concerning the adoption of agentic artificial intelligence in Dubai’s private sector. Announced measures included training for Business Councils, incubators for companies working on agentic AI, and dedicated funding mechanisms for companies and entrepreneurs in the field.

== See also ==
- Economy of Dubai
- Department of Economic Development (Dubai)
- Organisations based in Dubai
- Government agencies of Dubai
