= NTT Facilities =

NTT Facilities Inc.
- Company type: Incorporated
- Industry: Architecture; Engineering
- Founded: December 1, 1992
- Headquarters: Tokyo, Japan
- Area served: Worldwide
- Key people: Kiyoshi Tsutsui; President and CEO
- Revenue: ▼ \280 billion (2015)
- Operating income: ▲ \9.967 million (2015)
- Net income: ▲ \9.916 million (2015)
- Total assets: ▲ \166 billion (2015)
- Total equity: ▲ \71.786 million (2015)
- Number of employees: 5,500 (2015)
- Parent: NTT (100%)
- Website: NTT FACILITIES

NTT Facilities Inc. (株式会社エヌ・ティ・ティ・ファシリティーズ in Japanese) is an architecture firm headquartered in Minato, Tokyo. It started as the old NTT's Architecture and Engineering department and was incorporated as a wholly owned subsidiary of NTT in 1992.

== Subsidiaries ==
Japan

- NTT Facilities Research Institute (100%)
- NTT Facilities FM Assist (100%)
- NTT Intelligent Planning and Development Corporation (100%)
- NTT GP-ECOcommunication, Inc. (75%)
- Ennet (40%)

USA

- NTT Facilities USA (100%)
- Electronic Environments Corporation (60%)

China

- NTT設施工程設計（北京） (100%)

Singapore

- Pro-Matrix (51%)

Thai

- Unitrio Technology (49%)

== Sponsorship ==
- Omiya Ardija (Japanese football clubs formerly affiliated with NTT)
- NHK Symphony Orchestra

== See also ==
NTT and its Group companies:

- NTT Communications (NTT Europe, etc.)
- NTT Docomo
- NTT Data
- NTT Comware
