= WWA =

WWA may refer to:

- Warsaw (Polish: Warszawa)
- Watch, Warning, and Advisory system of the US National Weather Service
- Wattana Wittaya Academy, a boarding school for girls in Thailand
- Western Writers of America, promotes books about the American West
- World Waterpark Association, for companies who operate water parks
- World Weather Attribution, an international climatology research group
- World Wide Artists, British record label founded in 1973 by Patrick Meehan
- World Wrestling All-Stars, a former professional wrestling promotion founded by Andrew McManus
- World Wrestling Alliance (disambiguation), various professional wrestling promotions
- World Wrestling Association (disambiguation), various professional wrestling promotions
- WorldWide Access, a former Internet Service Provider in Chicago, Illinois
- WWA, the ISO 639-3 code of the Waama language, or Yoabu, a Gur language of Benin
- WWA, the National Rail station code for Woolwich Arsenal station, London, England
