= World Wrestling Alliance =

The World Wrestling Alliance is used by several regional and independent professional wrestling promotions, which include:

- World Wrestling Alliance, a failed 1987 split from the National Wrestling Alliance formed by Kansas City-based Bob Geigel; see Heart of America Sports Attractions
- World Wrestling Alliance (Massachusetts), an American independent promotion based in New England and founded by Mike Sparta and Brittany Brown
- World Wrestling Alliance, alleged sanctioning body for a version of the World Heavyweight Championship recognised in British Wrestling 1979-1988

== See also ==
- World Wrestling Association (disambiguation)
- WWA (disambiguation)
