= Tokyo Opera City Concert Hall =

Concert hall in Tokyo, Japan

Tokyo Opera City Concert Hall: Takemitsu Memorial
- 東京オペラシティ コンサートホール：タケミツ メモリアル; Tōkyō Opera Shiti Konsāto Hōru: Takemitsu Memoriaru
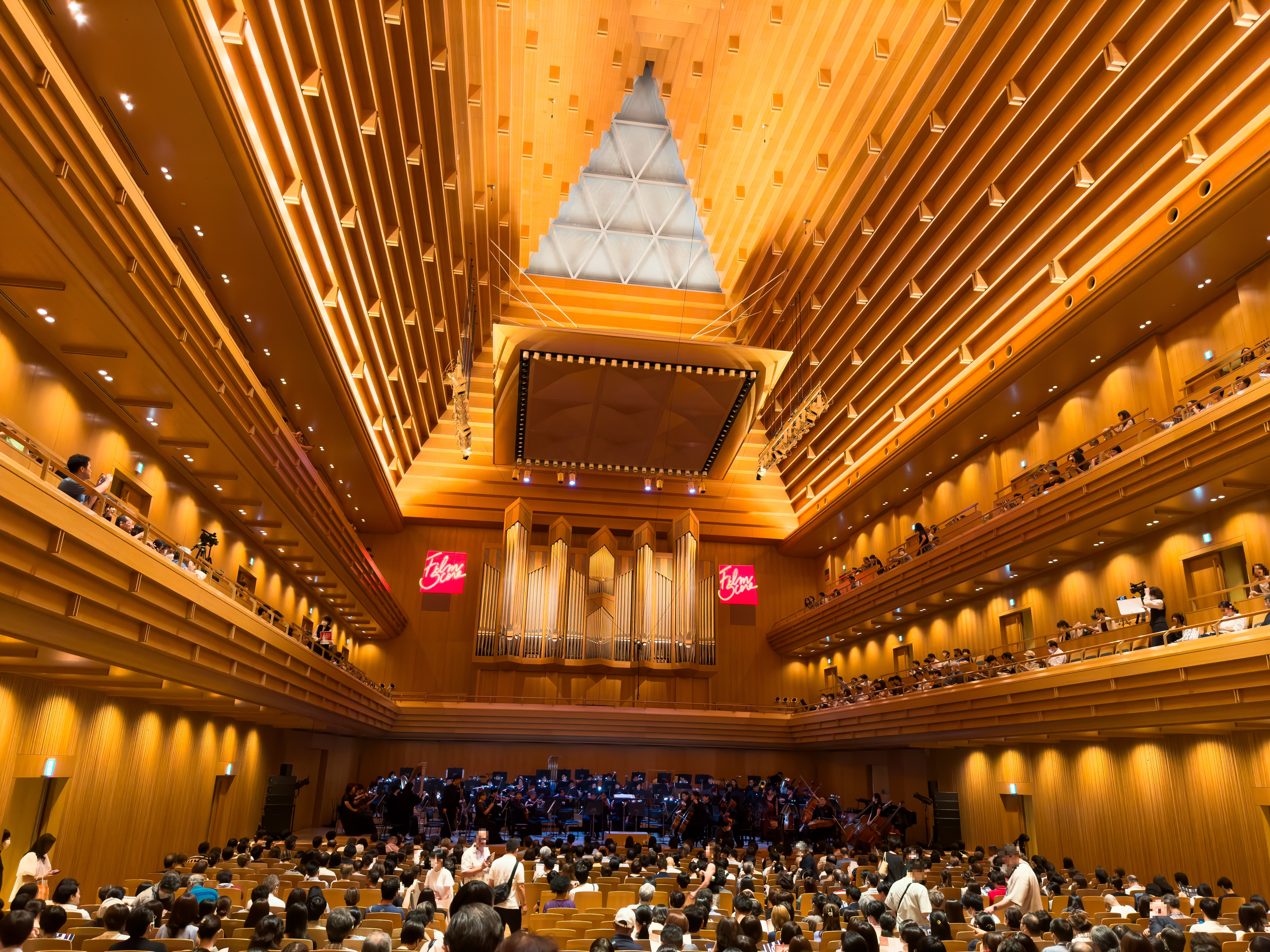
- Interactive map of the Tokyo Opera City Concert Hall: Takemitsu Memorial area

General information
- Location: Tokyo Opera City Tower (3F), 3-20-2 Nishi-Shinjuku, Shinjuku, Tokyo, Japan
- Coordinates: 35°41′00″N 139°41′12″E
- Completed: Autumn 1996
- Opened: 10 September 1997

Height
- Height: 27.6 metres (91 ft)
- Roof: stepped pyramidal ceiling

Dimensions
- Other dimensions: 41.4 metres (136 ft) (length); 20.0 metres (65.6 ft) (width) 15,300 m^{3} (540,000 ft^{3}) (volume)

Design and construction
- Architects: Yanagisawa Takahiko & TAK Associated Architects
- Architecture firm: NTT Facilities; Urban Planning and Design Institute
- Other designers: Leo Beranek & Takenaka Research & Development Institute (acoustic consultants)

Other information
- Seating capacity: 1,632

Website
- Official website

Tokyo Opera City Concert Hall (東京オペラシティ コンサートホール, Tōkyō Opera Shiti Konsāto Hōru) (TOCCH) is a concert hall that opened in the 54-floor Tokyo Opera City Tower in Shinjuku, Tokyo, Japan, in 1997. It is part of a complex that includes Tokyo Opera City Art Gallery [ja], a recital hall, and the New National Theatre, as well as shops and restaurants. The hall's acoustic and architecture have been highly acclaimed by Yo-Yo Ma, András Schiff, Kent Nagano, and others. TOCCH is dedicated to the memory of composer Takemitsu Tōru, artistic director of Tokyo Opera City Cultural Foundation and concept adviser, who died before its inauguration.

== Design and acoustics ==
The uniquely-shaped rectangular hall has a pyramidal ceiling that starts its rise above the second balcony tier and reaches its highest point nearer to the stage than to the back of the hall, the long rear part being covered with quadratic-residue diffusors. Over the stage hangs a sloping 9.6 square metres (103 ft^{2}) sound-reflecting canopy with an irregular lower surface.

Studies for the acoustic design included those of the design and acoustic data of sixty-six concert halls in twenty-two countries, the taking of acoustic measurements in twenty-three halls in Japan, Europe, and the Americas, CAD modelling, and a 1:10 scale wooden model. Results from the last lead to alteration in the sloping of the balconies.

Aiming at the uniform distribution of sound sources on the stage to the seating areas in the auditorium, criteria analyzed included reverberation time (for a "singing tone" as at the Concertgebouw, Musikverein, and Boston Symphony Hall) and early decay time (that relates to "clarity"); interaural cross-correlation coefficient (differences in sound pressure at the two ears); bass ratio (low- vs mid-frequency reverberation times); initial time delay gap ("intimacy"); strength (sound pressure compared with that from a similar source in an anechoic chamber); and sound diffusion index (homogeneity of sound).

== Capacity ==
The hall seats 1,632 over three levels, 974 on the first, 356 on the second, and 302 on the third. When occupied, the hall has a reverberation time of 1.95 seconds.

== Pipe organ ==
The pipe organ, with 3,826 pipes and 54 stops, was a collaboration between Orgelbau Kuhn of Switzerland and Yamaha, under the overall supervision of Guy Bovet.

== Other instruments ==
The hall has three Steinway D-274 pianos and a Bösendorfer 290, a harpsichord by Reinhard von Nagel, and a 4-stop positive organ by Marc Garnier.

== Initial performances ==
A "tuning concert" with audience was held on 11 June 1997, the New Japan Philharmonic under Seiji Ozawa performing Brahms Symphony No. 3, Tchaikovsky Piano Concerto No. 1, and Brahms Alto Rhapsody. After slight modification, the hall opened on 10 September with a performance of Bach's St Matthew Passion by the Saito Kinen Orchestra under Seiji Ozawa, with the Emperor and Empress in attendance.

== See also ==
- Musical acoustics
- Suntory Hall
- Tokyo Bunka Kaikan
