= NTT Inc. =

Japanese telecommunication company

NTT, Inc.
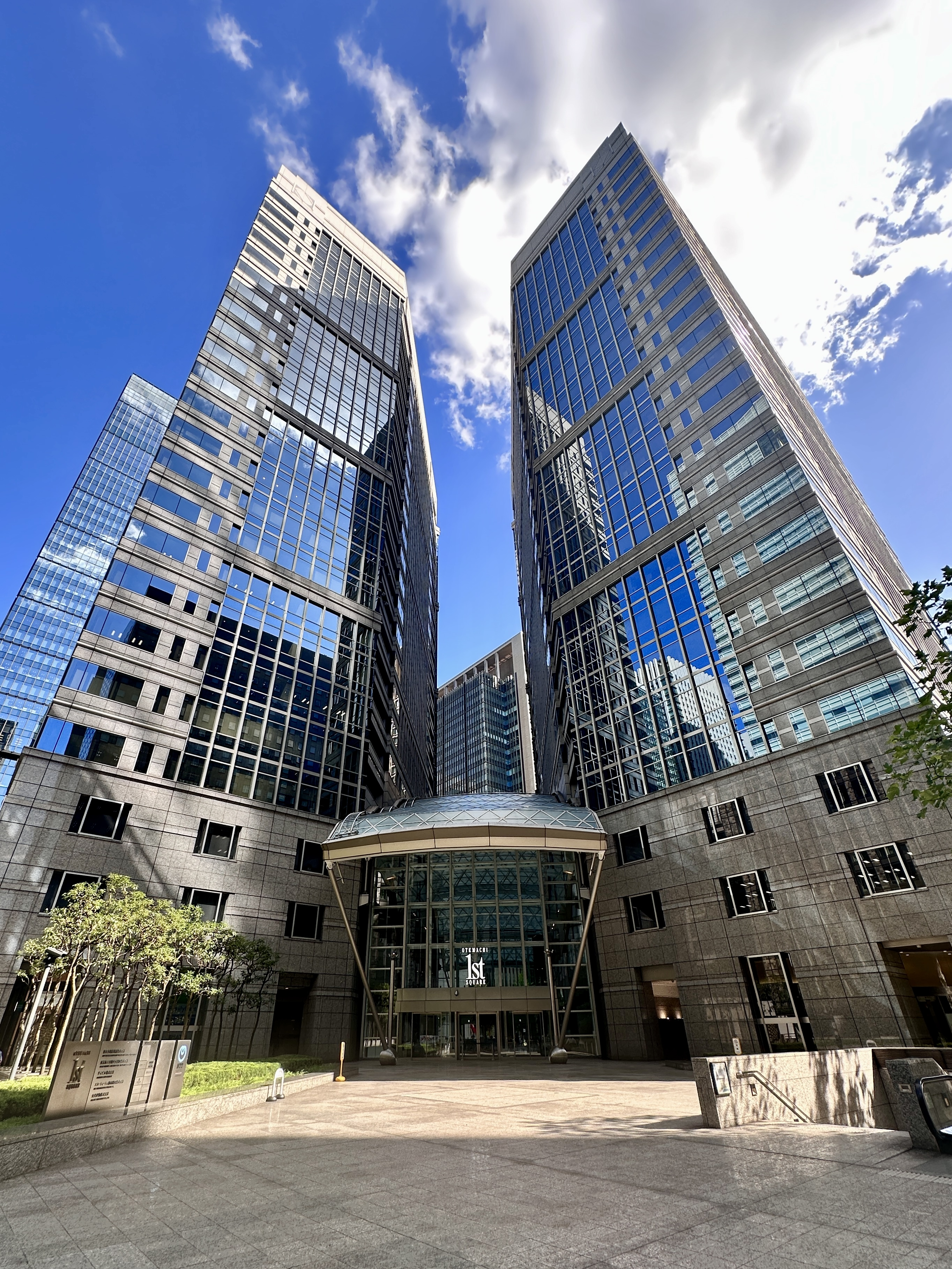
- Headquarters at Otemachi 1st Square in Ōtemachi, Chiyoda, Tokyo
- Native name: NTT株式会社
- Romanized name: NTT kabushiki gaisha
- Formerly: Nippon Telegraph and Telephone Corporation (1985–2025)
- Type: Public, Partly State-owned
- Traded as: TYO: 9432; Nikkei 225 component (9432); TOPIX Core30 component (9432)
- Industry: Telecommunications; Information technology
- Predecessor: Nippon Telegraph and Telephone Public Corporation
- Founded: 1 April 1985; 41 years ago
- Founder: Government of Japan
- Headquarters: Ōtemachi, Chiyoda, Tokyo, Japan
- Key people: Jun Sawada (chairman); Akira Shimada (president and CEO)
- Products: Fiber-optic communication networks; 5G & cellular network infrastructure; Data center infrastructure; Optical communication & photonics equipment; Enterprise software
- Services: Mobile telephony & broadband (NTT Docomo); Fixed-line telephony & fiber-optic broadband (NTT East/West); System integration (NTT Data); IT consulting; Cloud computing & managed services; Cybersecurity; Digital transformation; Fintech & mobile payments
- Revenue: ▲¥14.41 trillion (US$91.01 billion) (FY2025)
- Operating income: ▲¥1.71 trillion (US$10.78 billion) (FY2025)
- Net income: ▲¥1.04 trillion (US$6.55 billion) (FY2025)
- Total assets: ▲¥46.72 trillion (US$295.11 billion) (FY2025)
- Total equity: ▼¥10.22 trillion (US$64.54 billion) (FY2025)
- Owner: Minister of Finance (34.25%)
- Number of employees: 347,700 (2026)
- Subsidiaries: NTT East; NTT West; NTT Docomo; NTT Data; NTT Urban Solutions; NTT Anode Energy
- Website: group.ntt/en/ global.ntt

NTT, Inc. (Note: NTT株式会社, NTT Kabushiki gaisha) (formerly known as Nippon Telegraph and Telephone Corporation (Note: 日本電信電話株式会社, Nippon Denshin Denwa Kabushiki gaisha)), is a Japanese telecommunications holding company headquartered in Tokyo, Japan. Ranked 128th in Fortune Global 500, NTT is the sixth-largest telecommunications company in the world in terms of revenue, as well as the 17th largest publicly traded company in Japan by market capitalization, and the 6th largest by revenue, as of January 2026. In 2025, the company was ranked 79th in the Forbes Global 2000. NTT was the world's largest company by market capitalization in the late 1980s, and remained among the world's top 10 largest companies by market cap until the burst of the Dot-com bubble in the early 2000s.

The company traces its origin to the national telegraph service established in 1868, which came under the purview of the Ministry of Communications in the 1880s as part of a postal, telegraph and telephone service. In 1952, the telegraph and telephone services were spun off as the government-owned Nippon Telegraph and Telephone Public Corporation (Note: 日本電信電話公社, Nippon Denshin Denwa Kōsha; shortened to Den-Den Kōsha (電電公社)). Under Prime Minister Yasuhiro Nakasone, the company was privatised in 1985 along with the Japan Tobacco and Salt Public Corporation and subsequently the Japanese National Railways two years later, adopting the previous name until July 2025. While NTT has been listed on the Tokyo Stock Exchange since 1987, the Japanese government still owns roughly one-third of NTT's shares, regulated by the NTT Law (Law Concerning Nippon Telegraph and Telephone Corporation, Etc. (Note: 日本電信電話株式会社等に関する法律, Nippon Denshin Denwa kabushiki gaisha-tō ni kan-suru hōritsu; Law No. 85 25 December 1984)).

The company is incorporated pursuant to the NTT Law. The purpose of the company defined by the law is to own all the shares issued by NTT East and NTT West and to ensure proper and stable provision of telecommunications services all over Japan including remote rural areas by these companies as well as to conduct foundational research in telecommunications, developing the core technologies that will underpin the future of global connectivity. On 1 July 2019, NTT Corporation launched NTT Ltd., an $11 billion de facto holding company business consisting of 28 brands from across NTT Security, NTT Communications and Dimension Data.

Since its privatization in 1985, the abbreviation "NTT" has become synonymous with the brand name. Following amendments to the NTT Law permitting a change in its official trade name, the company was renamed Nippon Telegraph and Telephone Corporation (日本電信電話株式会社) to NTT, Inc. (NTT株式会社), effective 1 July 2025.

== History ==
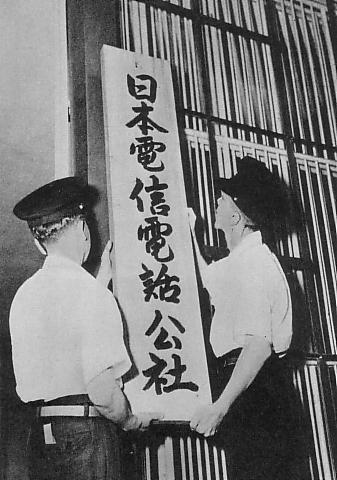
NTT was established as a government-owned corporation in 1952.

NTT roundel logo used between 1952 and 1985. A highly modified version of this logo is still used by the Geospatial Information Authority of Japan to mark telecommunications structures on their maps.

NTT "dynamic loop" logo with old wordmark used between 1985 and June 2025.

Established as a state monopoly in August 1952 to take over the Japanese telecommunications system, Nippon Telegraph and Telephone Public Corporation (日本電信電話公社, Nippon Denshin Denwa Kōsha; shortened into Den-Den Kōsha (電電公社)) was privatized in 1985 to encourage competition in the country's telecom market, making Japan the second country in the world (after the United States) to deregulate its telecom market. In 1987, NTT made the largest stock offering to date, at US$36.8 billion.

Because NTT owns most of Japan's last mile infrastructure (including broadband fibre connections), it has oligopolistic control over most landlines in Japan. In order to stimulate local competition, the company was divided into a holding company (NTT) and three telecom companies (NTT East, NTT West, and NTT Communications) in 1999. The NTT Law regulating NTT East and West requires them to serve only short-distance communications and obligates them to maintain fixed-line telephone service all over the country. They are also obligated to lease their unused optical fiber (dark fiber) to other carriers at regulated rates. NTT Communications is not regulated by the NTT Law.

In July 2010, NTT and South African IT company Dimension Data Holdings announced an agreement of a cash offer from NTT for Dimension Data's entire issued share capital, in £2.12bn ($3.24bn) deal.

In late 2010, NTT's Japan-to-US transpacific network reached 400 Gbit/s. In August 2011, its network capacity was expanded to 500 Gbit/s.

In 2021, Nippon Telegraph & Tel issued green bonds worth about 300 billion yen ($2.7 billion). The bonds include three tranches with maturities of 3, 5 and 10 years. The proceeds will be used for environmentally friendly projects (renewable energy, energy-efficient broadband infrastructure, etc.).

=== Corporate history timeline ===
- 1952 Nippon Telegraph and Telephone Public Corporation established
- 1979 INS Concept announced
- 1985 Nippon Telegraph and Telephone Corporation (NTT) incorporated as a private company
- 1987 NTT listed on the First Section of the Tokyo Stock Exchange
- 1988 NTT DATA Corporation started operations
- 1990 VI&P Concept announced
- 1992 NTT Mobile Communications Network, Inc. (presently NTT DOCOMO) started operations
- 1994 Basic Concept for the Coming Multimedia Age announced
- 1994 NTT creates the TwinVQ codec. It was later bought by Yamaha and renamed "SoundVQ". The underlying technology (TwinVQ) still lives today within the MPEG-4 audio standard.
- 1995 NTT DATA listed on the Second Section of the Tokyo Stock Exchange
- 1996 21st Century R&D Vision announced
- 1996 NTT DATA listed on the First Section of the Tokyo Stock Exchange
- 1996 NTT creates the DualSpeech voice codec, however, it was never broadly available and seemingly never made it out of beta.
- 1997 Digitization of communications network in Japan completed
- 1998 Global Information Sharing Concept announced
- 1998 NTT DOCOMO listed on the First Section of the Tokyo Stock Exchange
- 1999 NTT's operations reorganized into a holding-company structure: businesses transferred to three new wholly owned subsidiaries (NTT East, NTT West, and NTT Communications)
- 2002 prefecture-based subsidiaries of NTT East and NTT West started operations
- 2002 "Vision for a New Optical Generation" announced
- 2004 NTT Urban Development Corporation listed on the First Section of the Tokyo Stock Exchange
- 2004 "NTT Group's Medium-Term Management Strategy" announced
- 2008 Announcement of a new Medium-Term Management Strategy: "Road to Service Creation Business Group"
- 2025 The rebranding of corporate identity (logo) designed by Lippincott, to commemorate 40th anniversary, and the corporate name was changed from Nippon Telegraph and Telephone Corporation to NTT, Inc.

== Subsidiaries ==
NTT Group consists of the following major companies, divided into five segments. NTT East, NTT West, NTT Communications, NTT Docomo, and NTT Data are most major subsidiaries. NTT Data is listed on the stock markets. NTT Urban Development is a subsidiary involved in real estate. NTT Communications' business outside of Japan became part of NTT Ltd. on 1 July 2019.

=== Regional ===
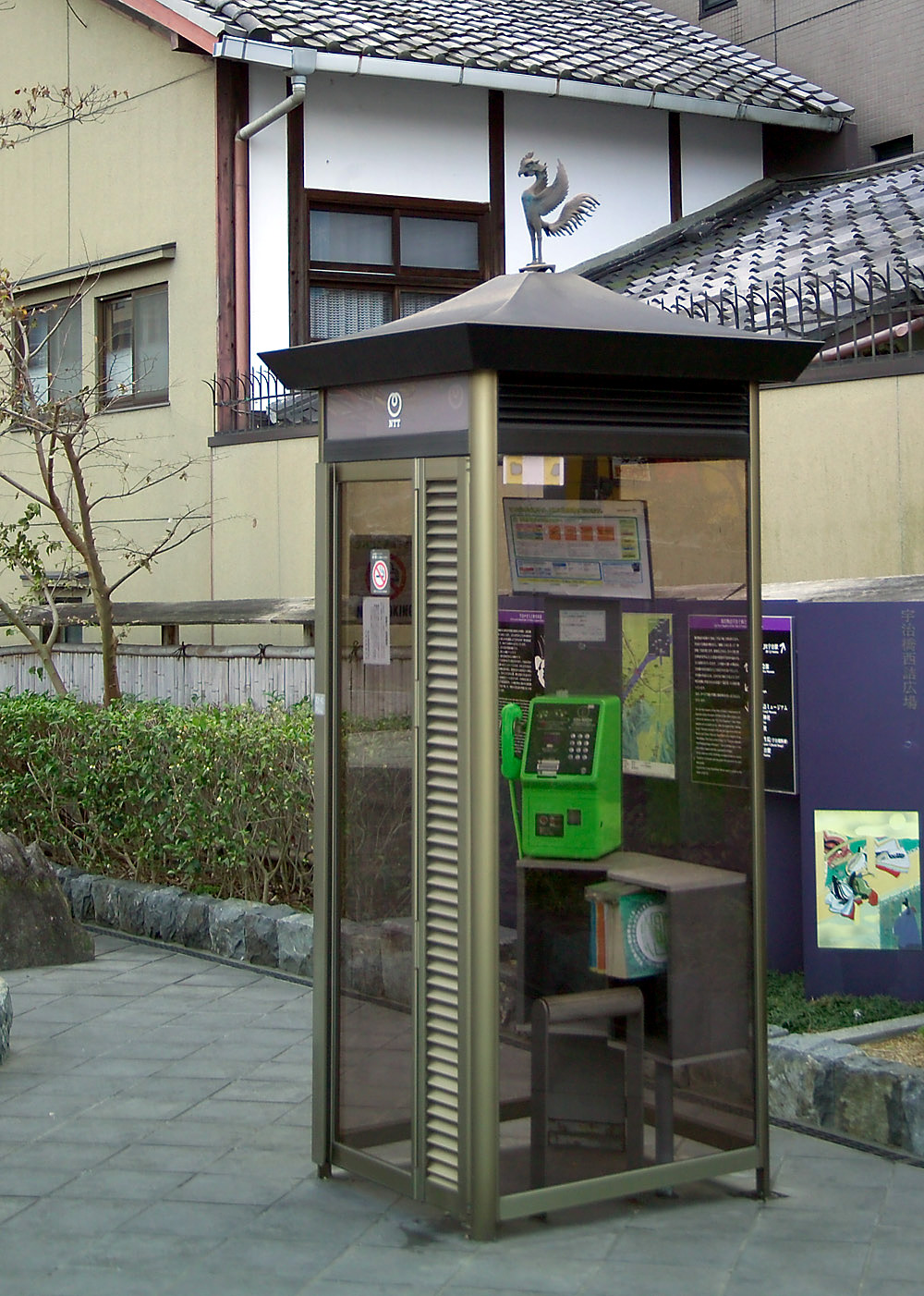
NTT phonebooth

- Nippon Telegraph and Telephone East Corporation (NTT East)
- Nippon Telegraph and Telephone West Corporation (NTT West)

=== Long distance and international ===
- NTT Communications
- NTT MSC
- Verio Inc
- NTT America
- NTT Europe
- HKNet
- Plala Networks

=== Mobile ===
- NTT Docomo

=== Data (system integration) ===
- Dimension Data (now part of NTT Ltd. except in the Middle East and Africa Region)
- e-shelter
- Gyron Internet Ltd
- NTT Data
- NTT Comware
- NTT Software
- NTT AT
- NTT IT

=== Information security ===
- NTT Security (now part of NTT Ltd. as of 1 July 2019)

=== Non-core subsidiaries ===
- NTT Finance
- NTT Urban Development

== R&D laboratories ==
- Service Innovation Laboratory Group
  - Service Evolution Laboratories (Yokosuka)
  - Media Intelligence Laboratories (Yokosuka)
  - Software Innovation Center (Musashino and Shibaura)
  - Secure Platform Laboratories (Musashino)
- Information Network Laboratory Group
  - Network Technology Laboratories (Musashino)
  - Network Service Systems Laboratories (Musashino)
  - Access Network Service Systems Laboratories (Tsukuba and Yokoska)
  - Energy and Environment Systems Laboratories (Atsugi)
- Science and Core Technology Laboratory Group
  - Network Innovation Laboratories (Yokoska)
  - Microsystem Integration Laboratories (Atsugi)
  - Photonics Laboratories (Atsugi)
  - Communication Science Laboratories (Keihanna and Atsugi)
  - Basic Research Laboratories (Atsugi)
- NTT Research, Inc. (East Palo Alto, California)
  - Physics & Informatics (PHI) Laboratory
  - Cryptography and Information Security (CIS) Laboratory
  - Medical and Health Informatics (MEI) Laboratory

In 2023, the World Intellectual Property Organization (WIPO)’s Annual PCT Review ranked Nippon Telegraph and Telephone's number of patent applications published under the PCT System as 10th in the world, with 1,760 patent applications being published during 2023.

== Sponsorship ==
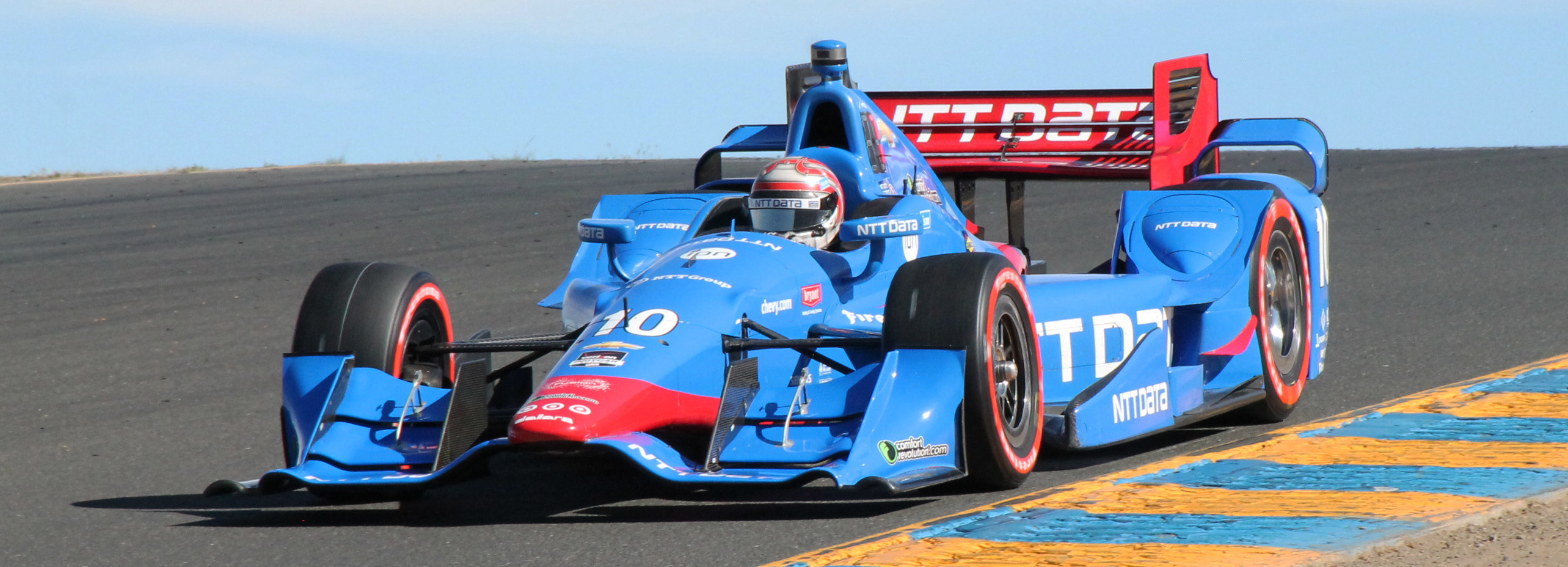
The NTT-sponsored IndyCar of Tony Kanaan in 2015

- Omiya Ardija and Roasso Kumamoto (Japanese football clubs formerly affiliated with NTT)
- Dandelion Racing, Super Formula team affiliated with NTT Docomo.
- Chip Ganassi Racing in the IndyCar Series (affiliated with NTT Data, drivers include Ryan Briscoe, Tony Kanaan, Scott Dixon, Ed Jones, and Felix Rosenqvist). In 2019, NTT also became title sponsor of the series.
- NTT Pro Cycling, UCI WorldTeam cycling team based in South Africa
- Naoya Inoue professional boxer affiliated with NTT Docomo.

== See also ==
- Telegraph
- Telephone
- List of telephone operating companies
