= Lyric Legend =

2010 mobile video game

- Developer: Tic Toc Games
- Publisher: TuneWiki
- Modes: Single, Multiplayer

Lyric Legend is a game designed for Android, iOS, and BlackBerry devices. The game received over 1 million downloads on iOS during its launch in 2010.

A sequel, Lyric Legend 2, was later released.
