= ATMNet =

ATMnet was a regional Internet service provider (ISP) located in San Diego, California, United States. It was formed in 1994 and operated until its purchase by Verio in November 1997 as part of the latter's national roll-up of regional ISPs.

ATMnet began as an operating unit of Visicom Laboratories Incorporated (Visicom) called Visicom Network Services (VNS). VNS was started by two Visicom employees (Mike Trest and Tom Lettington) as an experimental entry into the rapidly expanding ISP marketplace shortly after the government allowed commercial use of the Internet infrastructure. VNS provided dial-up services in the San Diego market and later provided dedicated Internet services to businesses through T1 and fractional T1 "local loop" circuits. As VNS was launched from Visicom as an independent entity, the founders were joined by Jim Browning, a co-founder of Visicom, and ATMNet was formed. ATMnet operated under the domain names atmnet.net and atmnet.com. In 1994, Visicom sold its interests in VNS to the founders and a former Visicom executive. This group formed a Limited Liability Partnership (LLP) doing business as ATMnet. This name was chosen to reflect the underlying technology (Asynchronous Transfer Mode) intended to form the basis of a new national infrastructure as ATMnet joined the emerging ISP industry as one of a small number of United States backbone providers. At its peak, the ATMnet backbone extended from San Diego to the San Francisco Bay area and eastward to Tucson, Arizona after merging with RTD Systems. The California portion was based on a fiber optic SONET links, carrying Internet Protocol (IP) packets over the ATM protocol cells. This network was implemented using switches manufactured by FORE Systems. An OC3-based circuit, it featured 155 Mbit/s of bandwidth, the first such link in the US to be publicly available for Internet services.

While only a regional ISP, ATMnet was a strong advocate for the early Internet providers throughout the California and Arizona service areas. Indeed, as a representative member of the Commercial Internet Exchange (CIX.org), ATMnet CTO appeared before the U.S. Federal Communications Commission to speak out against claims by Pacific Bell and other large phone companies. This BANDWIDTH forum was widely discussed and ATMnet's outspoken CTO Mike Trest went further to encourage cross-over discussions between members representing IETF, ATM FORUM, and CIX, which became part of the Clinton-Gore Next Generation Internet Program.

ATMnet was also one of many early Internet providers invited to assist in the creation the report "Research Challenges For The Next Generation Internet" for the Computing Research Association. Eventually this early next-generation initiative became "The Next Generation Internet Research Act of 1998".

In 1997, the San Diego Business Journal included in its annual publication a listing of San Diego Internet service providers, including ATMNet. Fourteen of the ISPs on the list used ATMNet's backbone for access to the Internet either through local loops or co-location of their servers and routers at the ATMNet facility in Sorrento Valley, San Diego. ATMNet's infrastructure at the time included dual fiber optic OC3-c connections to the regional Internet meet points in northern California operating at 155 Mbit/s. These circuits were the only circuits operating at that speed in the national Internet backbone that were not funded by any government programs or through subsidies.

After the sale of ATMnet to Verio, one of the ATMnet founders, with the principal of one of ATMnet's Japanese business partners (The Kuljian Corporation), founded ATMnet Japan (a.k.a. Nippon ATMnet) based in Shin-Yokohama, Japan. This company provided various Internet-related services and training for several years operating under the domain atmnet.co.jp.

== See also ==
- Asynchronous Transfer Mode
- Internet service provider
- Internet backbone
