= NTT Docomo Solutions =

NTT Docomo Solutions, Inc.
- Logo used since 2025

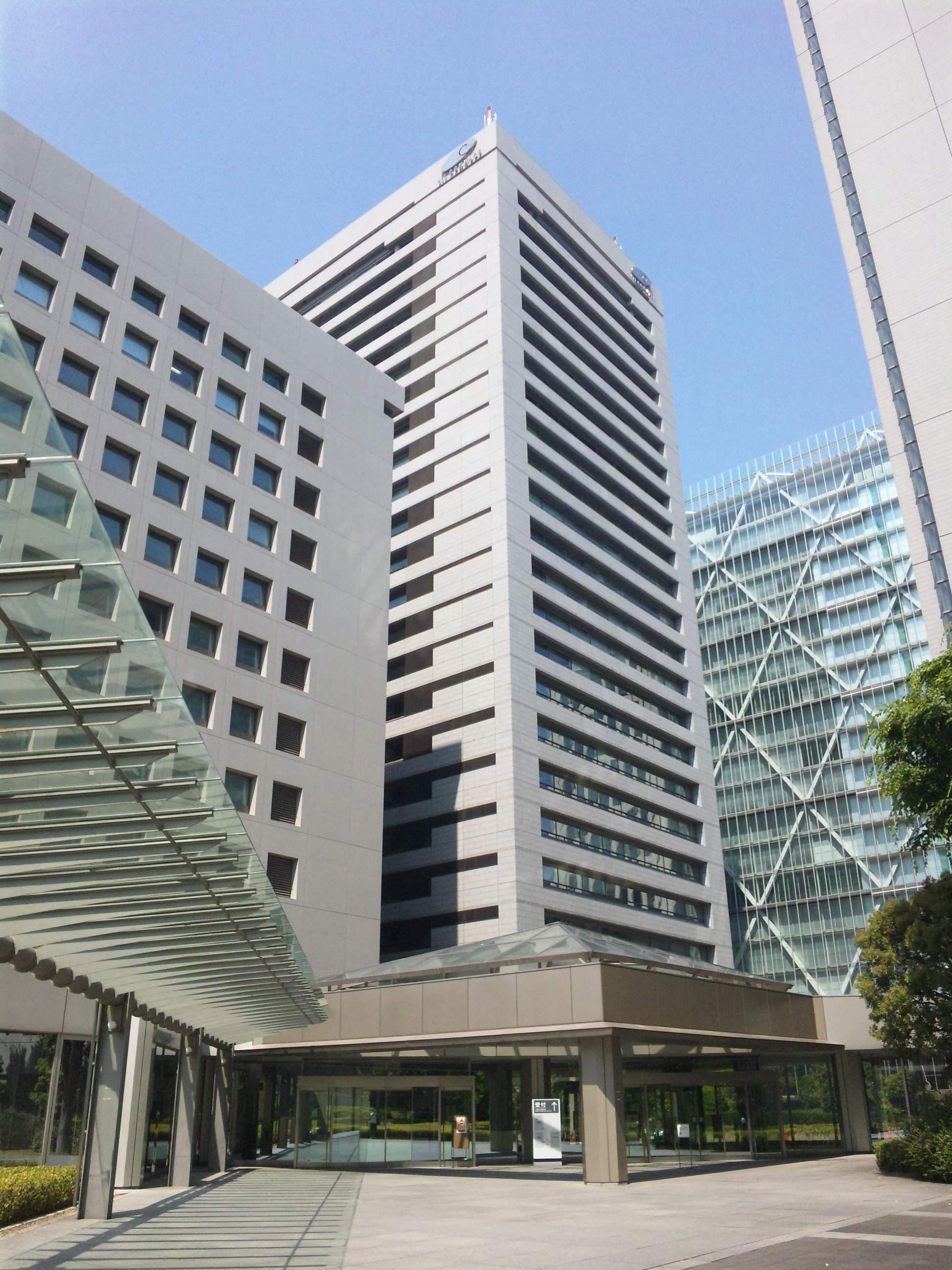
- Headquarters in Minato, Tokyo
- Native name: NTTドコモソリューションズ株式会社
- Romanized name: Entītī Dokomo Soryūshonzu Kabushiki-gaisha
- Formerly: NTT Communicationware Corporation (1997-2000); NTT Comware Corporation (2000-2025)
- Type: Subsidiary KK
- Industry: System integration & IT Services
- Founded: April 1997; 29 years ago
- Headquarters: Kōnan, Minato, Tokyo, Japan
- Key people: Tetsuya Miyakiri (president and CEO)
- Revenue: Yen 307,200,000,000 (March, 2005)
- Owner: NTT Docomo
- Number of employees: About 5,100
- Website: nttcom.co.jp

NTT Docomo Solutions, Inc. (NTTドコモソリューションズ株式会社, Entītī Dokomo Soryūshonzu Kabushiki-gaisha), formerly NTT Comware Corporation, is a system integration company which serves mainly the NTT Group. It started as the old NTT's IT Services department and was incorporated as a wholly owned subsidiary of NTT in 1997.

== General ==
NTT Comware Corporation is a system integration company which serves mainly the NTT Group. It started as the software center of the old NTT's IT Services department in 1985 and was incorporated as a wholly owned subsidiary of NTT in 1997.

Among the NTT Group companies, NTT Comware focuses on the IT services to the Group companies, while NTT Data mainly serves non-NTT Group companies, although NTT Comware has recently started to solicit work outside of the Group.

On October 25, 2021, NTT Docomo announced that it was acquiring NTT Communications and NTT Comware. The Acquisition was completed on January 1, 2022.

In 2025, NTT Comware Corporation was renamed to NTT Docomo Solutions, Inc.

== Subsidiaries ==
- NTT Comware Hokkaido
- NTT Comware Eastern Japan
- NTT Comware Tokai
- NTT Comware Western Japan
- NTT Comware Kyushu
- NTT Comware Billing Solution
- NTT Internet

== See also ==
NTT and its Group companies:

- NTT Communications (NTT America, NTT Europe, etc.)
- NTT Comware
- NTT Data
- NTT DoCoMo
