= NTT Data Engineering Systems Corporation =

NTT Data Engineering Systems Corporation (NDES)
- Industry: CAD/CAM Software
- Founded: 1977
- Headquarters: Tokyo, Japan
- Key people: Keiji Takeuchi, President
- Revenue: 8,500 million yen (2013)
- Number of employees: 294 (2007)
- Website: www.nttd-es.co.jp

Hitachi Zosen Information Systems was founded as a division of Hitachi Zosen Corporation in 1977, becoming an independent systems integration focussed on CAD/CAM, GPS/GIS, and ERP/SCM in 1997, and finally changing its name in 2006 to NTT Data Engineering Systems Corporation (NDES) when NTT Data Corporation acquired the management rights.

NDES supplies services and software products such as Space-E/Modeller, Space-E/CAM, Space-E/Mold, which are all based on the Catia system.

In addition to its activities in Japan, it has offices in China and Thailand and develops software in Vietnam and Slovakia.

In 2002 NDES signed an alliance with Dassault to develop and sell collaborative Space-E/CAM and MOLD products to the Asia-Pacific market. Vero Software Plc, a supplier of software to NDES, describes them as "the largest vendor of CAM systems in Japan" in 2004.
