= Tokyo Opera City Tower =

Skyscraper in Shinjuku, Tokyo, Japan

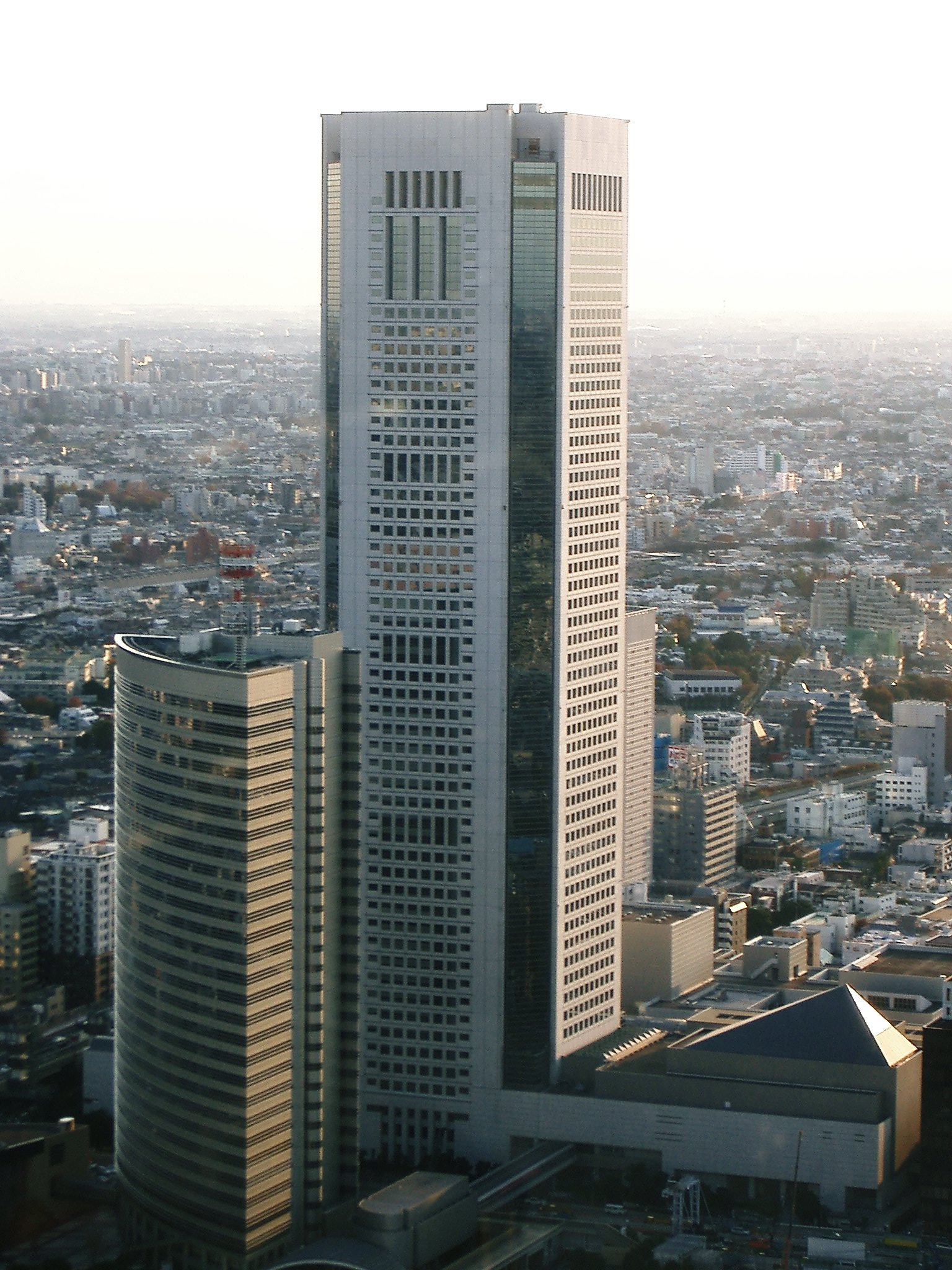
- Interactive map of the Tokyo Opera City Tower area

General information
- Status: Completed
- Location: Shinjuku, Tokyo, Japan
- Coordinates: 35.68356°N 139.68654°E
- Construction started: 1992
- Completed: 1996

Height
- Roof: 234 m (768 ft)

Tokyo Opera City Tower (東京オペラシティタワー, Tōkyō Opera Shiti Tawā) is a skyscraper located in Shinjuku, Tokyo, Japan. Completed in 1996, it stands 234 metres (768 feet) high and has 54 floors. The tower is the third-tallest building in Shinjuku, Tokyo, and seventh-tallest in Tokyo. The closest train station to Opera City is Hatsudai.

The building houses the Tokyo Opera City Concert Hall, an art gallery, a media-art museum (NTT InterCommunication Center) and many restaurants and shops on its lower floors. The fifth through fifty-second floors are devoted to office space.

The building is adjacent to the New National Theater, which is located in Shibuya, Tokyo. The combined complex of the tower and the theatre is called the "Tokyo Opera City".

== In film ==
The building is seen blown up by a UFO in the 1999 Kaiju film Godzilla 2000.

== Gallery ==
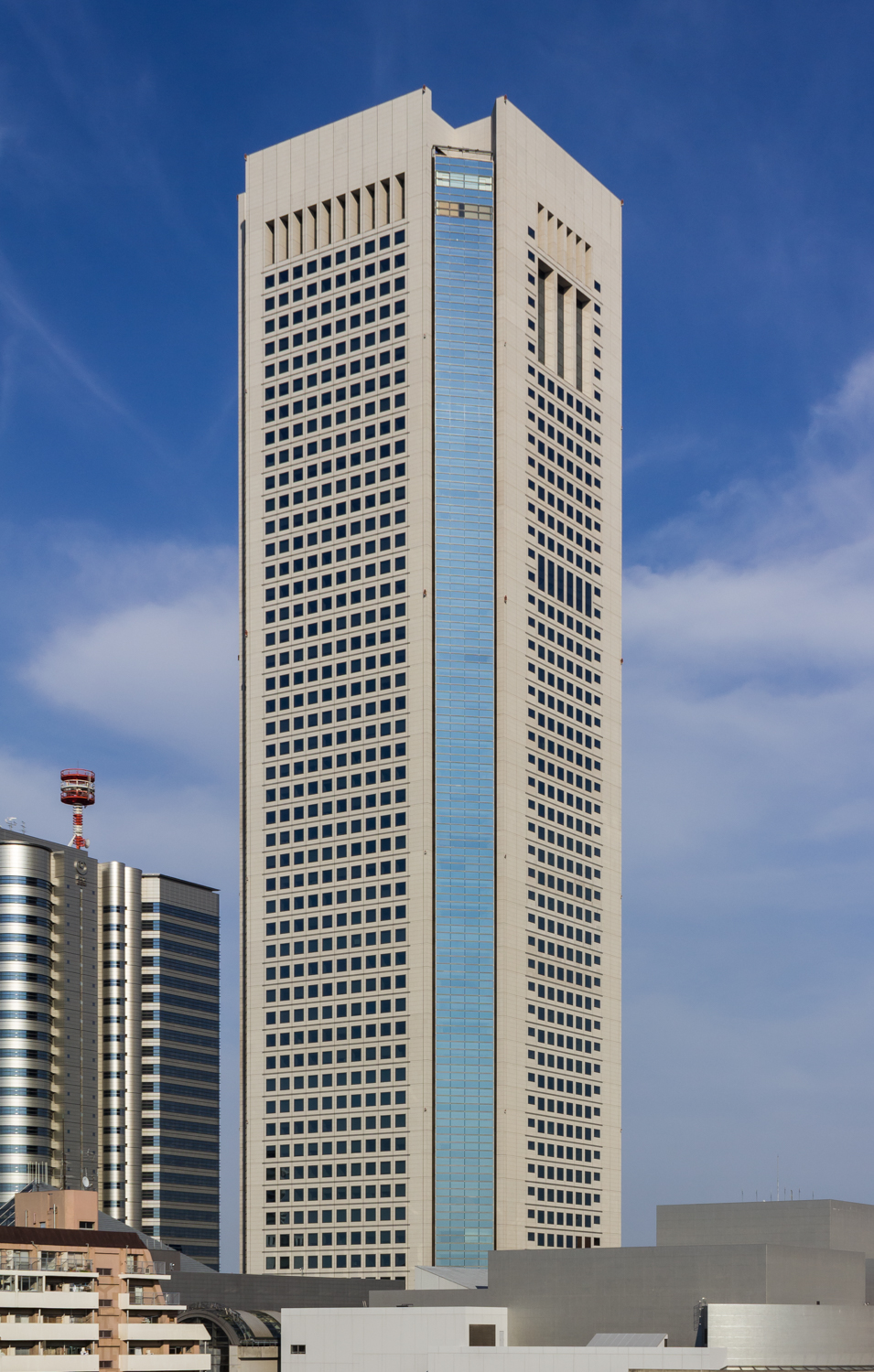
Tokyo Opera City Tower

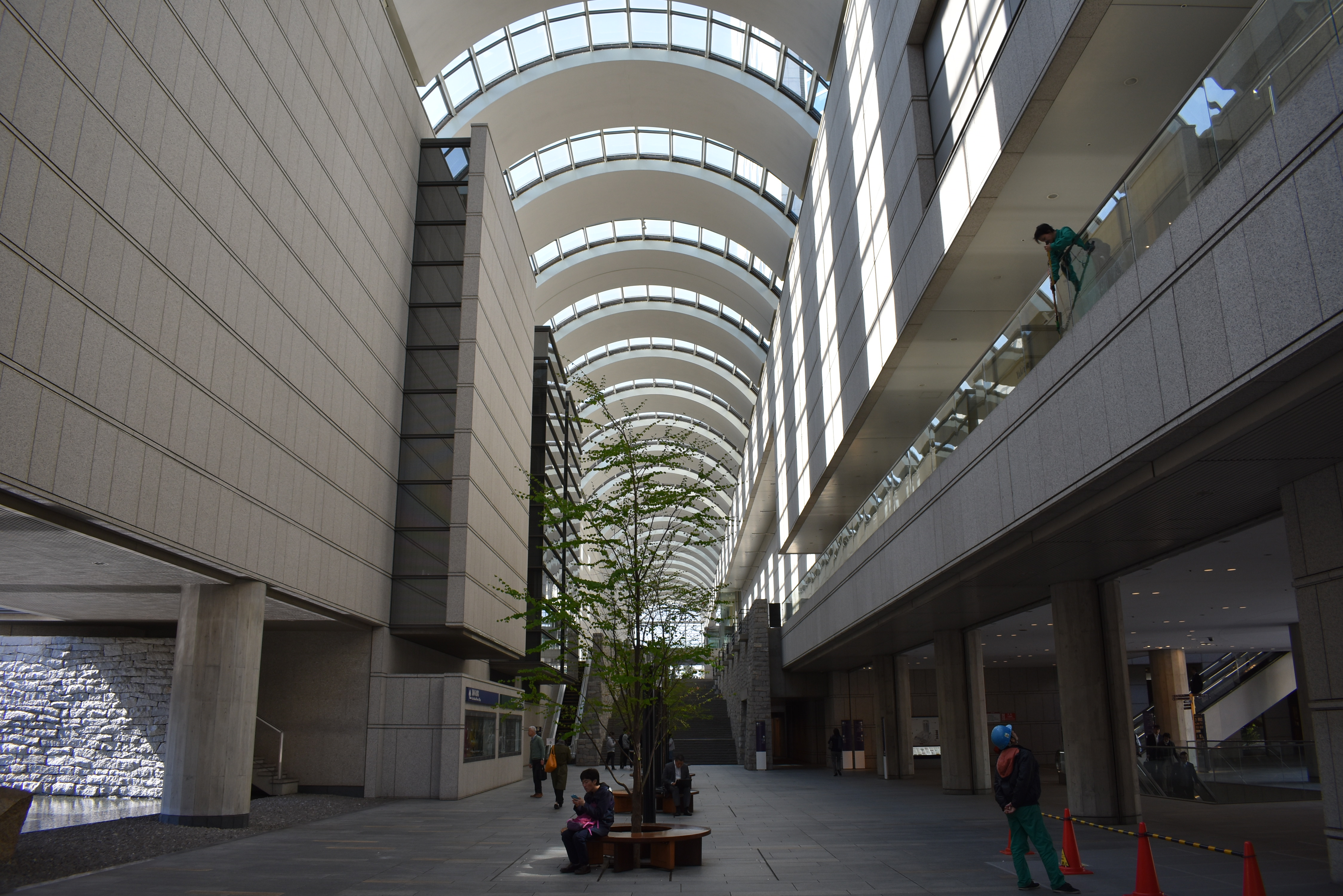
See "Galleria" from Koshu Kaido side (2019)
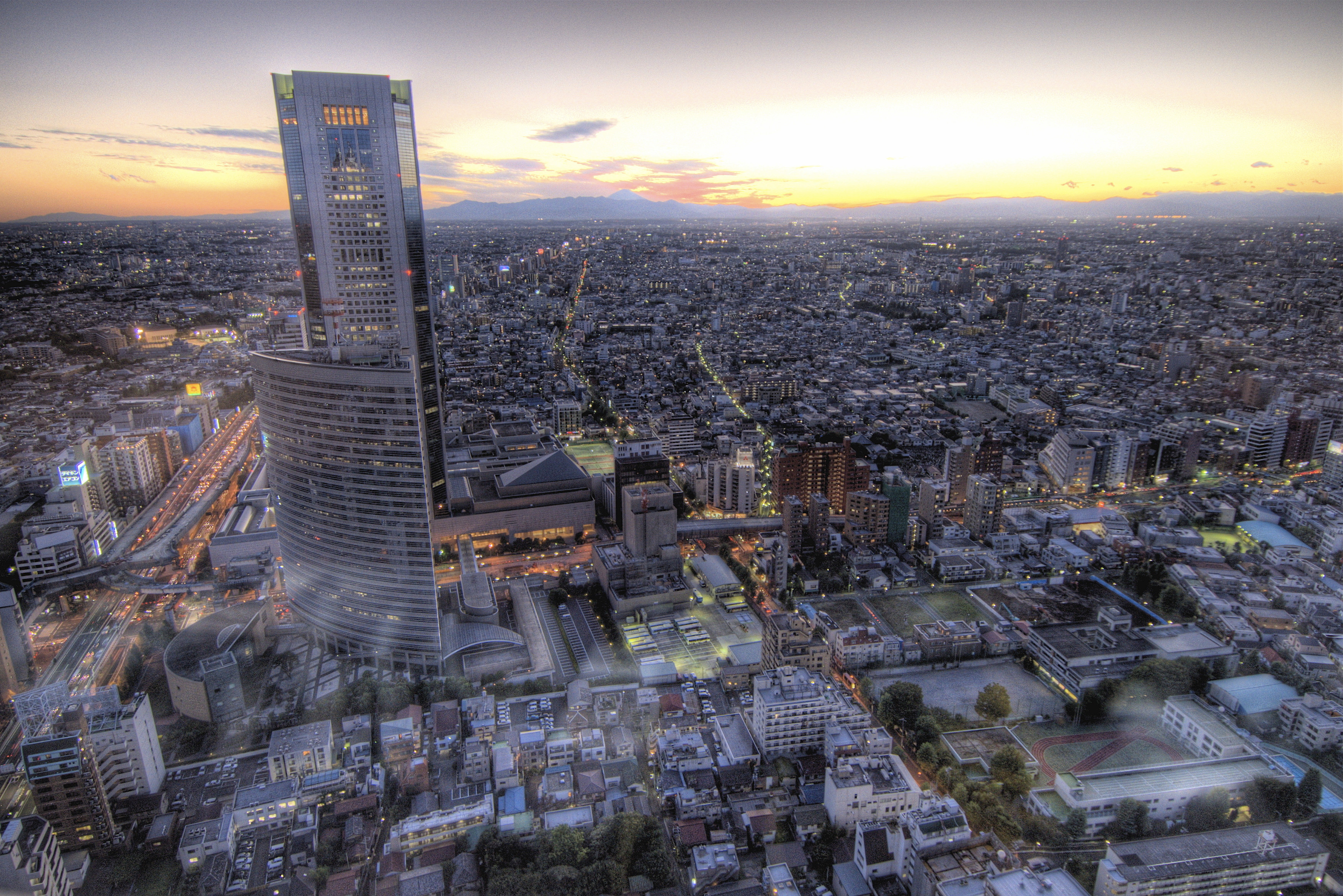
View of New National Theatre Tokyo and Tokyo Opera City Tower with Mount Fuji and sunset
