= NTT Data =

Japanese technology firm

NTT DATA Group Corporation
- Native name: 株式会社NTTデータグループ
- Romanized name: Kabushiki-gaisha NTT Dēta Gurūpu
- Formerly: NTT Data Communications Corporation (1988-1998); NTT DATA Corporation (1998-2023)
- Type: Public subsidiary
- Industry: Information technology Consulting; Outsourcing
- Founded: 1988; 38 years ago (spinoff from NTT)
- Headquarters: Toyosu, Kōtō, Tokyo, Japan
- Key people: Abhijit Dubey (president & CEO)
- Revenue: ▲¥4.64 trillion (US$42.27 billion) (FY2025)
- Operating income: ▲¥323.9 billion (US$2.95 billion) (FY2025)
- Net income: ▲¥142.5 billion (US$1.3 billion) (FY2025)
- Total assets: ▲¥8.01 trillion (US$72.96 billion) (FY2025)
- Total equity: ▲¥2.92 trillion (US$26.62 billion) (FY2025)
- Number of employees: 197,800 (2025)
- Parent: NTT, Inc.
- Subsidiaries: NTT DATA Japan, NTT DATA Inc.
- Website: www.nttdata.com/global/en/

NTT DATA Group Corporation (株式会社NTTデータグループ, Kabushiki-kaisha NTT Dēta Gurūpu) is a Japanese multinational information technology (IT) service and consulting company headquartered in Tokyo, Japan. It is a wholly owned subsidiary of Nippon Telegraph and Telephone (NTT).

Japan Telegraph and Telephone Public Corporation, a predecessor of NTT, started Data Communications business in 1967. NTT, following its privatization in 1985, spun off the Data Communications division as NTT DATA in 1988, which has now become the largest of the IT Services companies headquartered in Japan.

== History ==
Former logo of NTT Data without "Dynamic Loop", used until 30 June 2025.

=== 2000s ===
In 2002, it was the first Japanese company to obtain BS 7799 certification, an international information security standard. In 2007, the company had consolidated net sales of ¥1 trillion, and in 2008 the company acquired German-based Cirquent, Inc. A new organizational structure of the "Company System" was introduced in 2009. Also that year, the company acquired Extend Technologies Pty Ltd in Australia, as part of a strategy to expand the global footprint of specialised SAP consulting businesses

NTT DATA and US-based IT Service company Keane agreed to a merger on 29 October 2010. The acquisition is worth over US$1.23 billion. After the acquisition of Keane Inc., NTT DATA became the 8th largest software company in the world, with the annual revenue of $14 billion. Acquiring Keane Inc. in 2010 increased the Group's total work force to 50,000. That year the company also acquired FirstApex, increasing the business footprint in insurance domain. In 2010, NTT DATA acquired Intelligroup Inc., a US-based IT consulting and service providing company. After taking over Intelligroup, NTT DATA became the ninth largest software company in the world, worth over $11 billion. India-based Intelligroup, Inc is headquartered at 5 Independence Way Ste 220, Princeton, New Jersey, 08540, United States.

=== 2011–present ===
NTT Data Services in Plano (formerly Dell Services)

In 2011, the company acquired Italy-based Value Team S.p.A. and launched Global One Teams. In 2012 the company acquired London-based Design and Technology Consultancy, RMA Consulting, who specialize in software design and delivery across multiple channels.

In 2013, the company acquired Madrid-based Everis, a company that provided IT services including consulting, system integration and outsourcing. Also in 2013, NTT DATA, the IT services provider with its U.S. headquarters in Plano, acquired Optimal Solutions Integration, a provider of SAP services headquartered in Irving, Texas. In 2015, the company acquired Carlisle & Gallagher, Inc., a Charlotte-based consulting firm. Also that year, the company acquired iPay88 - Online Payment Gateway for Asia Countries, Malaysia which specialize in online payment services and payment solutions for merchants with multiple financial institutions as business partners in Malaysia. In 2016, the company acquired the Dell IT Services unit (mainly the former Perot Systems) of Dell Inc for $3 billion. Also in 2016, the company acquired Nefos, a Salesforce consulting partner in Germany, Austria and Switzerland.

in March 2022, NTT Data announced it had acquired the Detroit-based digital transformation and innovation company, Vectorform.

In July 2021 NTT Data announced their newly established NTT DATA EMEAL (Europe, Middle East, Africa, and Latin America) and would start its operation from 14 September 2022.The new company brings Everis (with a presence mainly in Europe, and Latin America) and NTT DATA EMEA (with a presence mainly in the UK, Italy, Germany, Poland, and Romania) under the same management, with 38,000 employees across 25 countries and a revenue of 3 billion euros.

In September 2025, NTT Data delisted itself from the Tokyo Stock Exchange, where it was previously traded as TYO 9613.

== Operations ==
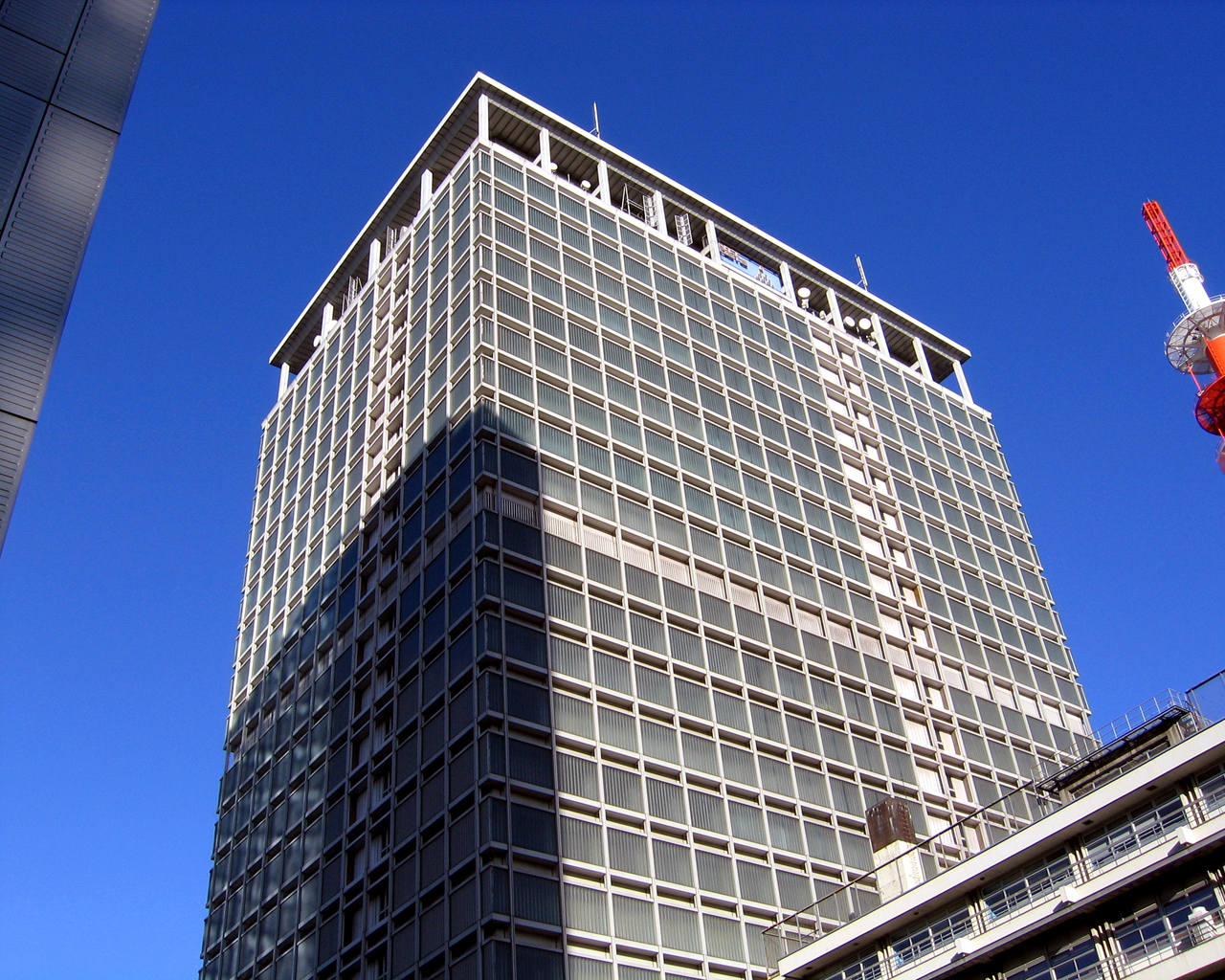
NTT Data's Osaka office in Dojima Building.

Within the NTT group, while NTT Comware focuses on the IT services to the Group companies, NTT Data mainly services non-NTT Group companies. Within Japan, NTT DATA has established many joint ventures, such as NTT Data-Sanyo Electric to take care of the IT services of Sanyo electric group. Outside Japan, NTT DATA has its wholly owned subsidiaries or offices in the UK, China, Malaysia, Thailand, India, the US, Italy, Australia, Romania, Singapore, Brazil, Vietnam and other countries or regions. NTT DATA Business Solutions headquartered in Germany is a global acting subsidiary of NTT DATA which had a 100 percent focus on SAP business until its merger with UK-based ServiceNow consultancy, Sapphire Systems in 2024.

Yutaka Sasaki serves as Representative Director, President & CEO.

== Products and services ==
Sponsored software:

- TOMOYO Linux (until March 2012)

Ticketing System

- Melbourne Australia myki

Large Language Model (LLM)

- In December, 2023 NTT Data released tsuzumi its proprietary Japanese Large Language Model.
- In October, 2025 NTT Data released a new version of its large language model, tsuzumi 2 which supports multiple languages including Japanese, English, Korean, French and German. According to the company this lightweight model can run on just one GPU while delivering top-tier performance comparable to ultra-large-scale language models.

== Awards ==
NTT DATA was ranked #8 in Consulting Magazine's 2016 Best Firms to Work For.

== Sponsorship ==
In 2017, NTT Data began sponsoring IndyCar Series team Chip Ganassi Racing. In 2019, the company became title sponsor of the series, dubbing it the NTT IndyCar Series.

NTT Data began sponsoring Arrow McLaren IndyCar team in 2023. The sponsorship was later extended to the McLaren Formula One team. In August 2024, the sponsorship was extended to the McLaren F1 Academy program.

== See also ==
- List of IT consulting firms
- Software industry in Telangana
- Nippon Telegraph and Telephone (NTT)
  - NTT Communications (NTT Europe)
  - NTT Comware
  - NTT Data Engineering Systems Corporation
  - NTT Docomo
  - Data Analytics Library
