= NTT Docomo =

Japanese telecommunications company

NTT Docomo, Inc.

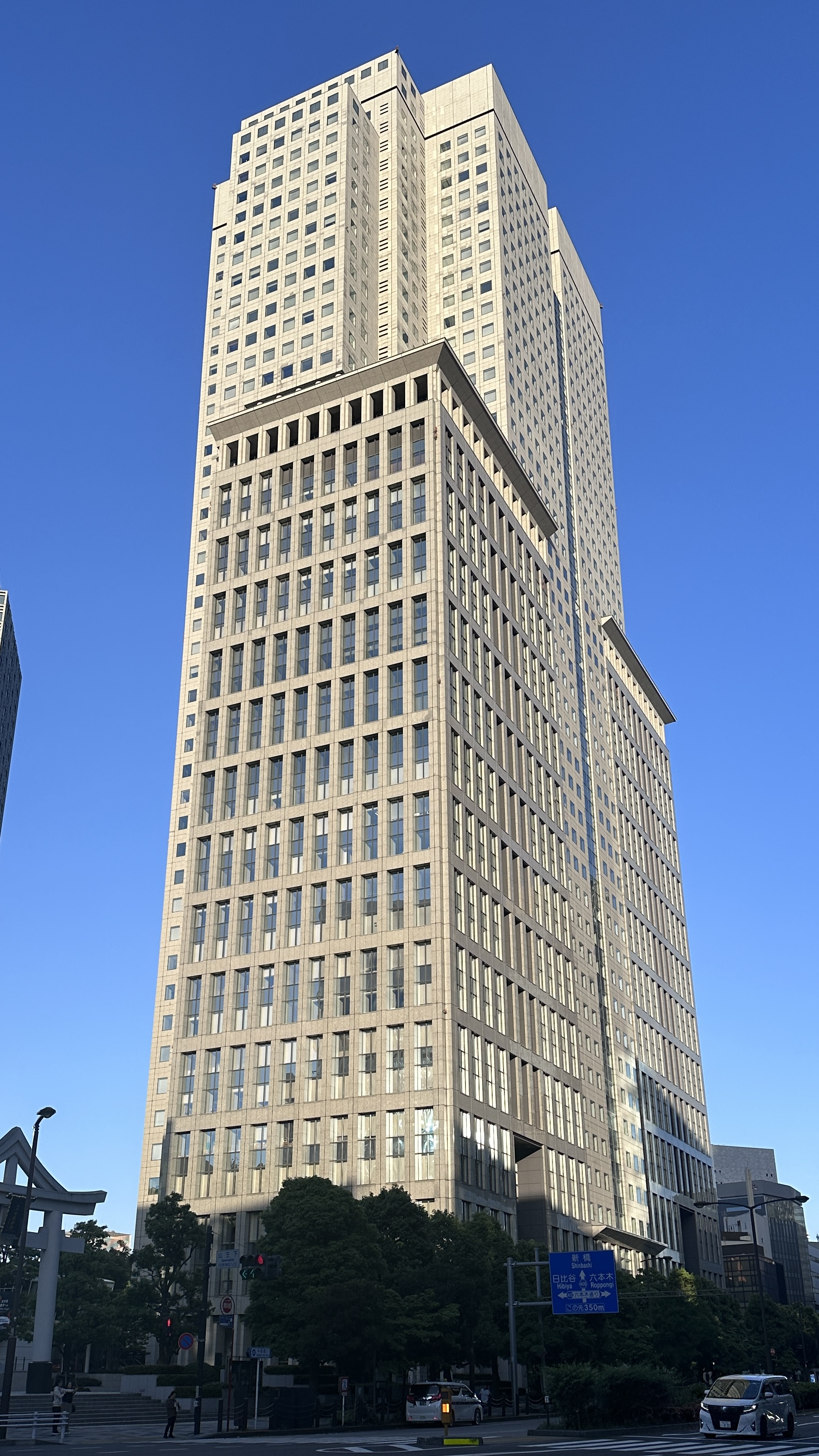
- Sanno Park Tower, home of NTT Docomo's headquarters
- Native name: 株式会社NTTドコモ
- Romanized name: Kabushiki gaisha NTT Dokomo
- Type: Subsidiary KK
- Industry: Telecommunications
- Founded: 14 August 1991; 35 years ago
- Headquarters: Sanno Park Tower; 11-1, Nagatachō 2-chome, Chiyoda, Tokyo, Japan
- Key people: Yoshiaki Maeda; President and CEO
- Products: PDC, i-mode, W-CDMA, FOMA, HSDPA, LTE, 5G NR, PHS
- Revenue: ▲¥6.06 trillion (2022)
- Operating income: ▲¥1.09 trillion (2022)
- Net income: ▲¥771.8 billion (2022)
- Total assets: ▼¥10.2 trillion (2022)
- Total equity: ▼¥6.95 trillion (2022)
- Number of employees: 27,558 (2019)
- Parent: NTT
- Divisions: R&D Innovation Division; Network Division; Product Marketing Division; Consumer Services Company
- Subsidiaries: Docomo CS; Docomo Pacific; Docomo Supports; Docomo Systems; Docomo Technologies; NTT Docomo Business; NTT Docomo Solutions (66.6%); NTT Plala; Docomo Anime Store (60%); Tower Records Japan (51%); True Corporation (25%); StarHub (9.97%); PLDT (8.56%)
- ASN: 9605
- Website: www.nttdocomo.co.jp

Logo used from 1991 to 2008

NTT Docomo, Inc. (株式会社NTTドコモ), stylized as NTT DOCOMO, is a Japanese mobile telecommunications carrier and a subsidiary of NTT, one of the world's leading telecommunications operators. Structured as a joint-stock corporation under the Companies Act of Japan, the company is headquartered in the Sanno Park Tower in Nagatachō, Chiyoda, Tokyo.

As the core of the NTT Docomo group—which encompasses 180 subsidiaries and 30 affiliates—the company provides mobile telephone services over its LTE and W-CDMA networks. It is the largest wireless carrier in Japan, with 91.407 million subscribers as of October 2025.

The company was incorporated in August 1991 as NTT Mobile Communications Planning Co., Ltd., and officially took over NTT's wireless telecommunication operations in July 1992. It has undergone several name changes throughout its history; it became NTT Mobile Communications Network, Inc. in April 1992, NTT DoCoMo, Inc. in April 2000, and adopted its current capitalized styling in June 2010.

Historically, the company decentralized its operations outside the Kanto-Kōshinetsu region. In July 1993, following an agreement between NTT and the Ministry of Posts and Telecommunications (currently the Ministry of Internal Affairs and Communications), it transferred these wireless operations to eight regional subsidiaries. These entities were eventually merged back into the parent company as the surviving entity in July 2008.

== Naming ==
According to the company, the name 'docomo' is based on a combination of the first letters of 'Do Communications over the Mobile network' with a wish and determination to satisfy users in every situation.

== Customers ==
NTT DOCOMO is a subsidiary of Japan's incumbent telephone operator, NTT. The majority of NTT Docomo's shares are owned by NTT (which is 33.71% government-owned). While some NTT shares are publicly traded, control of the company by Japanese interests (government and civilian) is guaranteed by the number of shares available to buyers. It provides wireless voice and data communications to subscribers in Japan. NTT Docomo is the creator of W-CDMA technology as well as mobile i-mode service.

NTT DOCOMO had over 53 million customers (as of March 2008), which is more than half of Japan's cellular market. The company provides a wide variety of mobile multimedia services. These include i-mode which provides e-mail and internet access to over 50 million subscribers, FOMA, which was launched in 2001 as the world's first 3G mobile service based on W-CDMA, Xi, a 4G LTE mobile service which was launched on December 24, 2010, Premium 4G, a LTE Advanced service which was launched on March 27, 2015, and DoCoMo 5G, a 5G NR service which launched on March 25, 2020.

In addition to wholly owned subsidiaries in Europe and North America, the company is expanding its global reach through strategic alliances with mobile and multimedia service providers in Asia-Pacific and Europe. NTT Docomo is listed on the Tokyo (9437), London (NDCM), and New York (DCM) stock exchanges.

On April 19, 2008, it was announced that Ryuji Yamada, the co-president of NTT DOCOMO, would be promoted to president of NTT Docomo in June 2008. Masao Nakamura would stay in NTT Docomo as a director and also the senior adviser. Since the introduction in October 2006 of the service that allows a user to take their original phone number to a new provider, NTT Docomo has lost many users to KDDI and SoftBank. This promotion was made in order to get more users for NTT Docomo. The company was the last major global mobile carrier to offer Apple's iPhone, which it finally did with the release of the iPhone 5s and 5c. This has been cited as one of the reasons for the steady stream of its customers switching to competing networks.

In June 2011, the company announced that they were teaming up with McAfee to provide McAfee VirusScan Mobile for its Android mobile users. In July 2012, NTT Docomo acquired Italy's Buongiorno in a deal worth 209 million euros.

== Research and development ==
In October 2007, Docomo and Mitsubishi Electric showcased a prototype mobile phone at the CEATEC trade show. The phone checked health by tracking body movement and measuring calories, and included a breath analyzer. On January 24, 2008, NTT Docomo announced a partnership with Google, which allowed all models after the FOMA904i models to view YouTube videos. In 2008, NTT Docomo became a founding member of the Symbian Foundation.

In May 2017, DOCOMO launched 5G trial networks at Aomi, Odaiba (Tokyo Waterfront City) and the area around Tokyo Skytree. It commercially launched its 5G network on March 25, 2020, making it the first Japanese operator to do so, and making Japan among the first country in the world to launch 5G.

In August 2021, DOCOMO and Airbus demonstrated a solar-powered Zephyr High Altitude Platform Station (HAPS) for use with 5G and 6G technology. The trial took place in the United States over 18 days, and involved flying in the stratosphere and transmitting data at various speeds up to a distance of 140 km. If successful, then Docomo and Airbus would be able to provide communication services to remote islands, mountainous areas, and to remote sea lanes.

== Earthquake warning system ==
From 2008, DOCOMO began offering a service called the "Area Mail Disaster Information Service" which broadcasts Earthquake Early Warning messages produced by the Japan Meteorological Agency to its subscribers with compatible handsets. This service is provided free of charge and messages are limited to those areas affected by each particular alert. These alerts have a unique ring tone so they can be easily distinguished from incoming calls or messages.

== Civil protection system ==
From 2014, under Civil Protection Law of Japan, DOCOMO began offering a service called the "Area Mail Disaster and Evacuation Information Service" which broadcasts J-Alert messages (including Earthquake Early Warning) produced by the Japan Fire and Disaster Management Agency to its subscribers with compatible handsets (e.g. Sony XPERIA, iPhone 5s, Samsung Galaxy).

The message is broadcast when threats are imminent (e.g. North Korea's ballistic missile launching, terrorist attack to nuclear power plant, volcanic eruptions, or an approaching tsunami.)

== Mascot ==
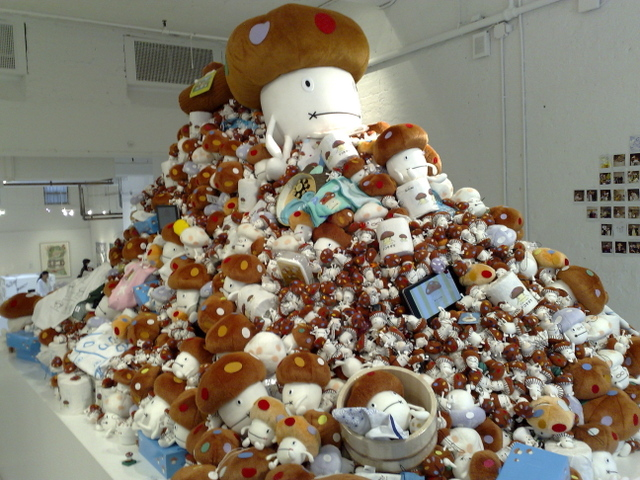
A large pile of Docomodake merchandise

Since 2005, the company's mascot is Docomodake, a mushroom, which is quite a celebrity in Japan. He is even the hero of a Nintendo DS puzzle and platforming video game, Boing! Docomodake DS, released in Japan, the North America and Europe. He also has a wide variety of merchandising such as cell phone straps, keychains, and plush dolls. As one type of advertising method, there are many types of Docomodakes such as Mother and Father, which symbolize the plans that NTT Docomo offers.

== Emoji ==
Shigetaka Kurita, who was part of the team working on NTT DoCoMo's i-mode mobile Internet platform, that has been credited as the first creator of emoji. However, SoftBank released their emoji set on the DP-211SW mobile phone in 1997.

Copyright ownership of an emoji typically belongs to the company or organization that created it. For example, the copyright for Apple's emoji designs belongs to Apple Inc. Similarly, the copyright for emoji used on platforms such as Facebook, Twitter, and WhatsApp belong to the respective companies.

Emoji are standardized through the Unicode Consortium, which sets standards for how emoji should look and what they should represent. However, individual companies and platforms can still design their own variations of emoji within those standards.

== Investments outside Japan ==
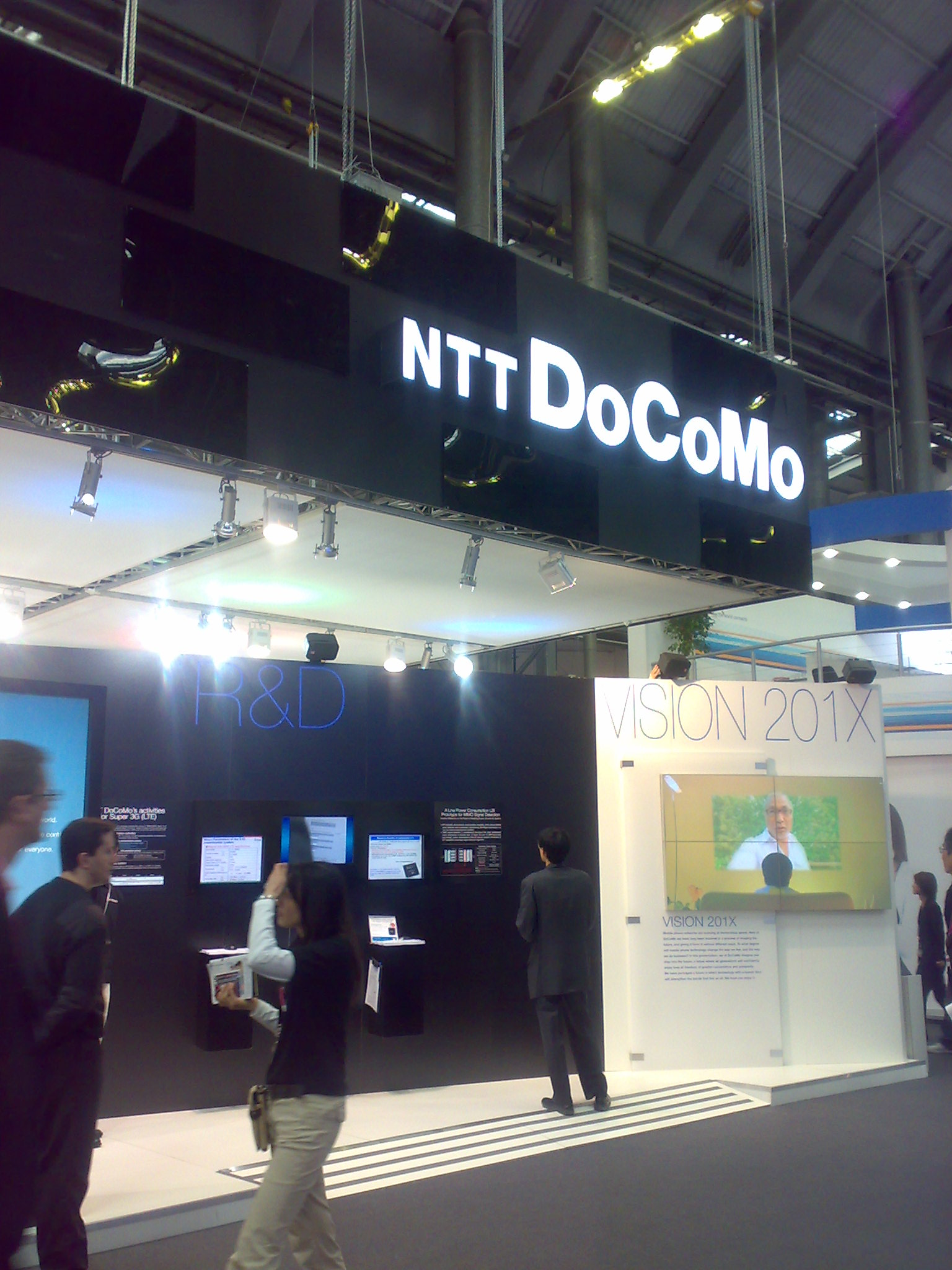
NTT DoCoMo stand at 2008 GSMA Mobile World Congress, Barcelona

NTT Docomo has a wide range of foreign investments. However, NTT Docomo was not successful in investing in foreign carriers. Docomo had invested very large multibillion-dollar amounts in KPN, KT Freetel, AT&T Wireless, and had to write-off sell all these investments in foreign carriers. As a result, Docomo booked a total of about US$10 billion in losses, while during the same time Docomo's Japan operations were profitable.

In December 2007, NTT Docomo and KT Freetel jointly invested US$200 million for a total of 33% stake in U Mobile Malaysia.

In June 2008 NTT Docomo joined the non-profit Symbian Foundation led by Nokia to co-develop a new Symbian smartphone operating system based on the S60 platform, which resulted in Symbian^2 for the Japanese market.

In December 2006 they acquired Guamcell, the largest phone company in Guam, and changed its name to DOCOMO PACIFIC.

Docomo is working on implementing its FeliCa-based payment system, called iD, government. It has already launched the system in Guam, as well as Shanghai and Beijing, China (however, as of November 2010, it has withdrawn iD terminals from all merchants in China).

== Docomo Capital ==
Working closely with NTT Docomo's business and R&D divisions, Docomo Capital is in charge of NTT Docomo's venture investments in mobile related start-up companies, mainly in the United States and has committed $100M in capital. It has invested in Cooliris, Couchbase, Evernote, Fab.com, HighlightCam, Swype, TuneWiki, and Sigfox.

== Docomo Digital ==
Docomo Digital is the international payments business of NTT DOCOMO. DOCOMO Digital partners with carriers, merchants, OTT services, app stores and payment providers in both developed and emerging markets to facilitate direct carrier billing and other payments such as e-wallets. Sold to Bango plc August 2022.

== Docomo Group ==
On October 25, 2021, NTT Docomo announced that it was acquiring NTT Communications and NTT Comware. The Acquisition was completed on January 1, 2022. The two companies were renamed to NTT Docomo Business and NTT Docomo Solutions.

== Hikari TV ==
Hikari TV (ひかりTV) is a Japanese IPTV service. It was established on March 31, 2008, and was originally owned and operated by the internet service provider NTT Plala. It launched Hikari TV Game, the first cloud gaming service for televisions in Japan, in 2013.

On July 1, 2022, NTT Docomo absorbed and merged the operating company NTT Plala, and on the same day, this service was also incorporated into NTT DoCoMo's service. Along with this, the rate plan for new subscribers was changed after the same day.

Aside from offering access to various television channels, Hikari TV also produces its own content, primarily broadcast on the Hikari TV Channel.

== Various problems and scandals ==
=== Problems with installation and construction of base stations ===
- In June 2005, the construction of a base station in Ikeda, Osaka, began without the required paperwork and destroyed the Furue Tomb.
- In June 2006, it was discovered that a base station installed in Arashiyama, Kyoto in 1999 had not been notified in advance under the Cultural Heritage Protection Law.
- In June 2008, it was discovered that a base station in the Hirao district of Nagashima-cho, Izumi County, Kagoshima Prefecture, had been installed without a permit in Unzen Amakusa National Park in 2006.

Both of these base stations were removed or relocated after the problem was discovered.

=== Illegal customer data sharing with Amazon Japan ===
In November 2026 the Ministry of Internal Affairs and Communications issued an administrative guidance order after it had illegally shared the data of 340,000 online customers with Amazon Japan. The ministry ordered the implementation of measures to prevent recurrence as required under the Telecommunications Business Act.

== See also ==
- Japanese mobile phone culture
- NTT Docomo USA
- List of mobile network operators
- List of telephone operating companies
- List of telecommunications regulatory bodies
