= World Wrestling Association (disambiguation) =

World Wrestling Association is a professional wrestling promotion based in Tijuana, Mexico.

World Wrestling Association may also refer to:

- World Wrestling Association (Indianapolis), a professional wrestling promotion based in Indianapolis, Indiana
- Worldwide Wrestling Associates, a professional wrestling promotion based in Los Angeles, California

== See also ==
- WWA (disambiguation)
