= WorldWide Access =

WorldWide Access, also known as WWA, was an Internet service provider based in Chicago, Illinois. WorldWide Access was the service name of the company, which was called Computing Engineers, Inc.

WorldWide Access operated from 1993 until 1998, when it was acquired by Verio. At that time, WWA was located on the nineteenth floor of the Civic Opera Building at 20 N. Wacker Dr., where it had moved from the seventh floor six months earlier.

== Services ==
WorldWide Access offered typical ISP accounts of the era, including terminal dial-up into BSD/OS UNIX shell systems, SLIP, and PPP; web hosting; UUCP and mail hosting; DNS registration and hosting; and leased-line circuits. The company also offered tech support for Macintosh computers, which was somewhat of a rarity at the time. WorldWide Access focused its sales efforts on signup up corporate clients but the company also served thousands of residential customers. The company focused heavily on customer service excellence and was considered to be one of the better ISP operations in the Chicago area.

=== MagicServer ===
WWA was one of the first ISPs in the Chicago area to capitalize on virtual web hosting, by custom-coding virtual hosting into the NCSA httpd webserver before it was a core part of the product. This service was called MagicServer (another service mark of the corporation). The MagicServer version of httpd worked around some of the problems that plagued other implementations, such as the number of open file descriptors on the system, but had issues of its own which led to its eventual abandonment in favor of the standard built-in Apache virtual hosting.

MagicServer hosts originally also ran on the BSD/OS shell servers, but were relocated to Sun SPARC hosts running Solaris in 1996. These were tako and anago, and later gari and soba were added.

== Acquisition and the local competitors ==
WorldWide Access was ultimately only one of several Chicago-based small Internet providers, which, in the end, were nearly all swallowed up by larger providers. WWA was the first to be sold, to Verio, in April 1998.

- EnterAct was acquired in 1998 by 21st Century, which was in turn later acquired by RCN Communications
- American Information Systems ("AISNet") was acquired in 1999 by Exodus Communications
- MCSNet was acquired in August 1998 by Winstar Communications
- Tezcatlipoca ("Tezcat") was acquired in 2000 by Ripco
- InterAccess was acquired in 2000 by Allegiance Telecom

Of the major local providers, only Ripco remained unsold, and it still operates independently as of 2017.
