= NTT Plala =

Japanese internet service provider

NTT Plala Inc.
- Trade name: Plala
- Native name: 株式会社NTTぷらら
- Type: Kabushiki gaisha
- Industry: Information and communication industry
- Founded: Tokyo, Japan (December 18, 1995)
- Headquarters: 24th floor of Sunshine 60, 3-1-1, Higashi-Ikebukuro, Toshima, Tokyo, Japan
- Revenue: 7.81 billion yen
- Parent: NTT Docomo
- Website: www.plala.or.jp

Plala (ぷらら) is a major Japanese Internet service provider operated by NTT Plala Inc. It was established in 1995 and focuses on consumer internet services. The company's name was changed to "NTT Plala" from "Plala" on March 1, 2008.

On May 26, 2022, NTT Docomo announced that it would absorb Plala on July 1, consolidating the businesses of the two companies.
