= TuneWiki =

- Website type: Music Applications, Social Media
- Available in: Multilingual
- Headquarters: Santa Monica, CA, United States
- Owner: Vert Capital Corp
- Commercial: Yes
- Registration: Free
- Launched: December 2007
- Current status: Offline

TuneWiki was a music-centered startup that provided synchronized scrolling lyrics through its social music players for cellphones and handheld devices. The company was founded in 2008 and shutdown in 2014.

== History ==
TuneWiki was founded in 2008 by Rani Cohen- chairmen, Amnon Sarig- President, and Chad Kouse- CTO. The company was purchased by Vert Capital in July 2013.

- In 2010, TuneWiki entered into an agreement with Music Reports, Inc. which Music Report would make use of its Songdex database to identify songs, and would handle the licensing of the lyrics displayed through the TuneWiki application.
- In September 2012, TuneWiki was voted the number one app by the San Francisco Chronicle.
- On June 20, 2013, a news article appeared stating that TuneWiki will shut down on June 28, 2013
- On June 25, 2013, TuneWiki also sent an e-mail to registered users confirming the shutdown.
- On June 28, 2013, TuneWiki was purchased by Vert Capital and notified its users that it would be remaining open. During this transition period Seth Gerson was appointed CEO as part of the company's restructuring.
- On August 13, 2014, TuneWiki shutdown without notice. Vert Capital has since failed to pay its datacenter bills, effectively shuttering the business.
- On August 22, 2014, TuneWiki came back online with no official statement.
- In November 2014, TuneWiki officially shutdown.

== Features ==
TuneWiki had agreements with the major music publishers including Sony, Universal, and EMI to legally use synchronized lyrics in TuneWiki's music applications.

TuneWiki provided real-time scrolling lyrics that display as a song plays, for songs saved on the phone as well as for songs played through streaming radio, provided that the user first synchronizes the initial line of textual lyrics with the correct verse of the playing song.

A geolocation feature located songs playing in the area of the user, and included social media functionality for posting to popular social media websites.

Users were able to follow other users to discover and discuss the music they listen to.

== Supported devices ==
TuneWiki had applications released for iPhone and iPod Touch, Android, Windows Phone 7, BlackBerry, Symbian S60v5, Nokia Series 40 (Java based) and Maemo, with a plugin for Windows Media Player, as well as an app for Spotify.

== Controversy ==
TuneWiki was selected by various wireless carriers (such as Verizon Wireless) to preload their application onto cellphones before sale, typically accompanied by OS settings which prevent the owner of the device from deleting the application.

== See also ==
- Libre.fm
- Lyric Legend:Game designed by TuneWiki
