= Verio =

Global web hosting provider headquartered in the U.S.

Verio Inc.
- Industry: Web hosting
- Founded: 1996
- Headquarters: 8005 S Chester St. Suite 200; Centennial, CO 80112
- Key people: Hideyuki Yamasawa, president and chief executive officer
- Parent: NTT Communications
- Website: www.verio.com

Verio is a global web hosting provider headquartered in the United States. Incorporated in 1996 in Denver, Colorado, it is a wholly owned subsidiary of Nippon Telegraph and Telephone (NTT) Communications, which acquired the company in 2000. Verio was formed from a consolidation of over 200 smaller Internet service providers (ISPs) and web hosting services.

== History ==
Verio was founded by Darin Brannan and Justin Jaschke, and several senior management team members subsequently joined from OneComm/Nextel. The company idea, including the initial business plan and pitch deck, began in the halls of Norwest Venture Partners after several months of market diligence and target acquisition discussions. Venture Capitalists George J. Still, Jr. and Darin Brannan from Norwest Venture Partners ultimately teamed with Steven C. Halstedt from the Centennial Funds and Steve Schovee from Telecom Partners to syndicate and launch the business in 1996.

In order to validate the strategy and raise capital, Brett Sharenow and Lynn Morris from Morris Associates were hired to create the first detailed engineering-driven financial model consisting of ISPs, core network infrastructure, and server farms, allowing Verio to raise substantial funds ($1.1 billion) from principal founders, several top tier VC's, NTT and institutional investors with which to purchase target acquisitions and build out centralized back office, support, national sales and infrastructure.

By the year 2000, Verio had purchased 55 ISP/Hosting companies, most in the U.S. but some in Europe. During this time Verio went public on the NASDAQ, trading under the symbol VRIO, with a market value exceeding $1 billion. Shortly after the IPO, in early 2000, Verio was sold to NTT at a per-share price of $73, a total cost slightly exceeding $5 billion. Because NTT was a 53% Japanese government-owned company, foreigners were not allowed to own NTT stock, according to Japanese law at the time, and therefore the buy-out was a 100% cash deal, making it one of the highest grossing deals of the dotcom era. The United States Congress held hearings over the transaction to ensure it did not violate national security concerns. The Justice Department and the Federal Bureau of Investigation expressed concern that the Japanese government, which owned 53 percent of NTT at the time, could gain access to classified information should the U.S. government use Verio's network to tap Internet communications during an investigation. To placate these concerns, NTT agreed to form a separate division within the company staffed only by U.S. citizens to handle any work in support of government investigations. As a result, the Committee on Foreign Investment in the United States recommended that President Clinton allow the $5.5 billion purchase to proceed. The deal also prompted scrutiny of Japan's openness to foreign telecom competitors.

Shortly after the announced deal, the NASDAQ stock market crashed in the spring of 2000 in the dot-com bubble burst. The agreed price of $73 remained and NTT and Verio completed the transaction by the fall of 2000.

Verio continues to operate as a wholly owned subsidiary of NTT Communications.

At the end of 2005, the backbone and some dedicated hosting centers moved to NTT America, with the web hosting business staying with Verio. The European arm, Verio Europe, was moved in its entirety to NTT Europe. In October 2006, Verio Europe was renamed NTT Europe Online.

In late May 2015, Verio Shared SMB hosting division, as a business unit of NTT America, Inc. (“NTT America”), was sold to The Endurance International Group, Inc. Endurance continues to provide web hosting, email and domain name services under the Verio name.

== Some of the ISPs purchased by Verio ==
Verio was initially built on a business model known as a "rollup", composed entirely of smaller companies operating under the Verio brand name. By the year 2000, Verio had purchased more than 50 small ISPs and hosting companies, most in the US but also in Europe, ranging in price from under US$1 million to over US$100 million per ISP. These companies were often mature and well-known brand names in their local markets — more well known than Verio — and often continued to operate with a great deal of local autonomy even after purchase by Verio. Some of the companies purchased by Verio were leading pioneers in the internet industry (Digital Nation, NorthWestNet), representing the first wave of commercial ISP access and hosting in regional markets around the US and Europe.

Some of these companies included:

- Access One (accessone.com), Western Washington
- AimNet (aimnet.com), Santa Clara, California
- ATMNet (atmnet.net), San Diego, California
- Best Internet Communications, Mountain View, California
- Branch Net (branch.net, branch.com), Ann Arbor, Michigan
- CCNet (ccnet.com) Walnut Creek, California
- ClarkNet (clark.net, clarknet.net), Columbia, Maryland
- Communique (cmq.net), Gulf South
- Compute Intensive, Inc.
- CompuTech, Spokane, Washington
- Computing Engineers, Inc. (dba WorldWide Access) (wwa.com, wwa.net), Chicago, Illinois
- Digital Nation (dn.net), Alexandria, Virginia
- Florida Internet (flinet.com), South Florida
- Global Enterprise Services (ges.net, ges.com, jvnc.net), New Jersey
- Global Internet Network Services (globalinternet.com), formerly MIDnet (mid.net), Lincoln, Nebraska
- Hiway Technologies (hiway.com/.net, hway.com/.net, rapidsite.com/.net), Boca Raton, Florida
- Internet Engineering Associates, Inc.
- Internet Now, Inc. (inetnow.net), Atlanta, Georgia
- Internet Servers, Inc. (iserver.net, iserver.com, secure.net), Orem, Utah
- Long Island Internet (li.net), Long Island, New York (acquired in 1998)
- MagicNet (magicnet.net), Orlando, Florida
- Monumental Network Services, (monumental.com/.net, mns.com/.net, mnsinc.com/.net), Chantilly, Virginia
- National Knowledge Network (NKN) (nkn.net, nkn.com, nkn.edu), Dallas, Texas
- Network Intensive (ni.net, compute.com), Irvine, California
- New York Net (new-york.net), New York City
- NorthWestNet (nwnet.net), Bellevue/Seattle, Washington
- NS Net (ns.net), Sacramento, California
- OnRamp (onramp.net), Dallas, Texas
- Pacific Rim (pacificrim.com, pacificrim.net), Bellingham, Washington
- PacketWorks (packet.net), Tampa Bay, Florida
- Pioneer Global (pioneerglobal.com, pn.net, wing.net), New England
- PrepNet (prep.net, prepnet.net, prepnet.com), Pittsburgh, Pennsylvania
- QualNet/IAGNet (qual.net, qualnet.net, iagnet.net, cic.net, cyberdrive.net, harborcom.com), Cleveland, Ohio
- RAINet (rain.net, rain.com), Oregon
- RustNet (rust.net), Michigan
- ServiceTech (servtech.com), Rochester, New York
- SesquiNet (sesqui.net), Houston, Texas
- SigNet (sig.net), Austin, Texas
- SmartConnect (smartconnect.net), McLean, Virginia
- Spacelab (spacelab.net, mxol.com), New York City
- Starnet (starnet.net), St. Louis, Missouri
- Structured (structured.net, sns-access.com), Oregon
- Surf Networks (surfnetwork.net, p3.net, dynanet.net), Philadelphia, Pennsylvania
- Tab Net (tab.net, tabnet.net, criticalpath.net, cp.net), Napa Valley, California
- TerraNet (terra.net, terranet.net, terranet.com), New England
- Web Communications (webcom.com), Santa Cruz, California
- West Coast Online (wco.com), Rohnert Park, California
- WingNet (wingnet.com), Woburn, Massachusetts
- WWW-Service, Regensburg, Germany

== See also ==
- Register.com v. Verio
