= NTT Docomo Business =

Japanese company

NTT Docomo Business, Inc.

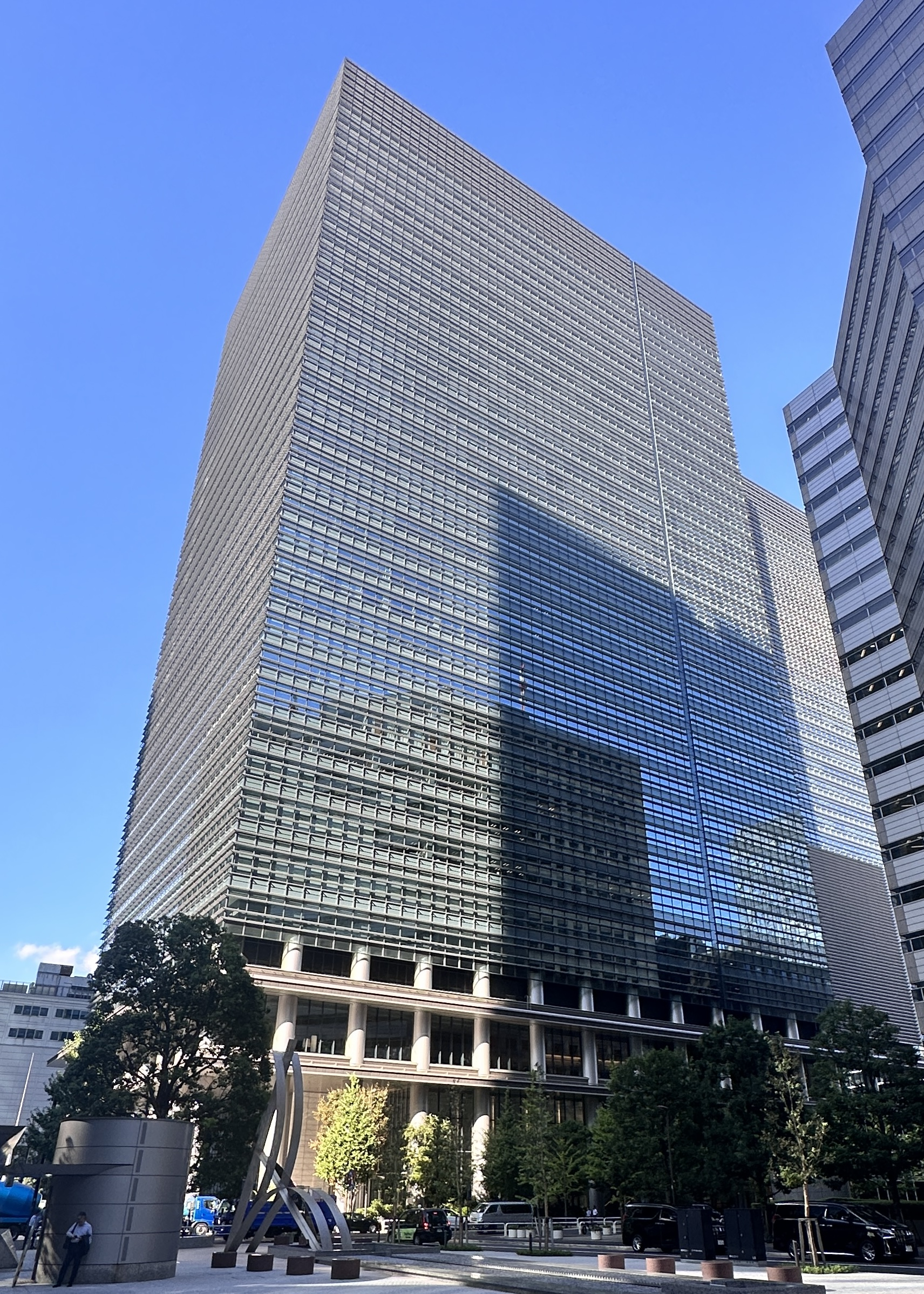
- Headquarters in Ōtemachi, Chiyoda, Tokyo
- Native name: NTTドコモビジネス株式会社
- Romanized name: Enutiti Dokomo Bijinesu Kabushiki-gaisha
- Formerly: NTT Communications Corporation (1999–2025)
- Type: Private
- Industry: Telecommunications
- Founded: May 28, 1999; 27 years ago
- Headquarters: Otemachi, Chiyoda, Tokyo, Japan
- Key people: Toru Maruoka; President & CEO
- Parent: NTT Docomo
- Subsidiaries: NTT America; Verio; NTT Europe; NTT Resonant emerio
- ASN: 2914
- Website: www.ntt.com (in Japanese) www.ntt.com/index-e.html (in English)

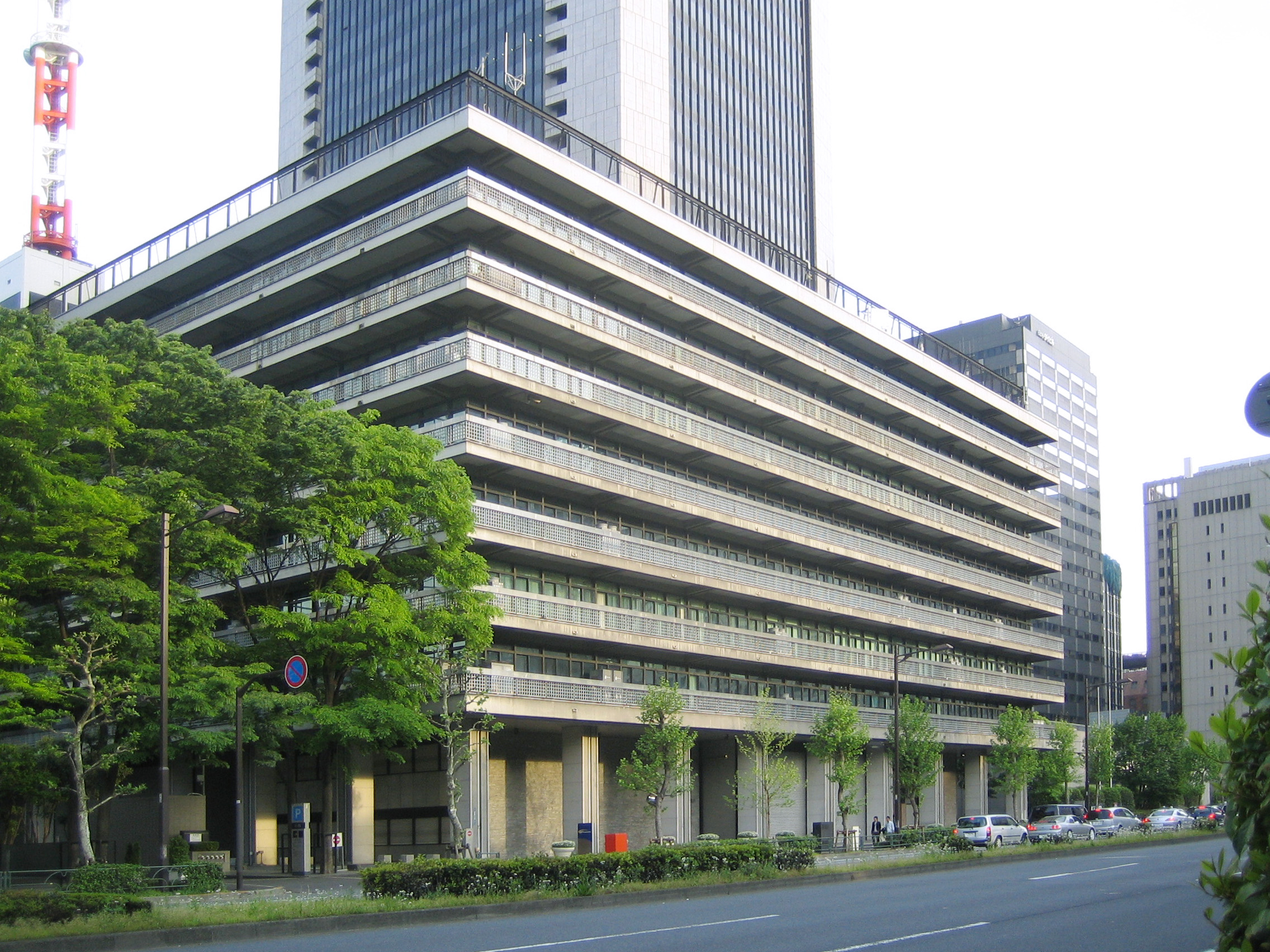
NTT Hibiya building

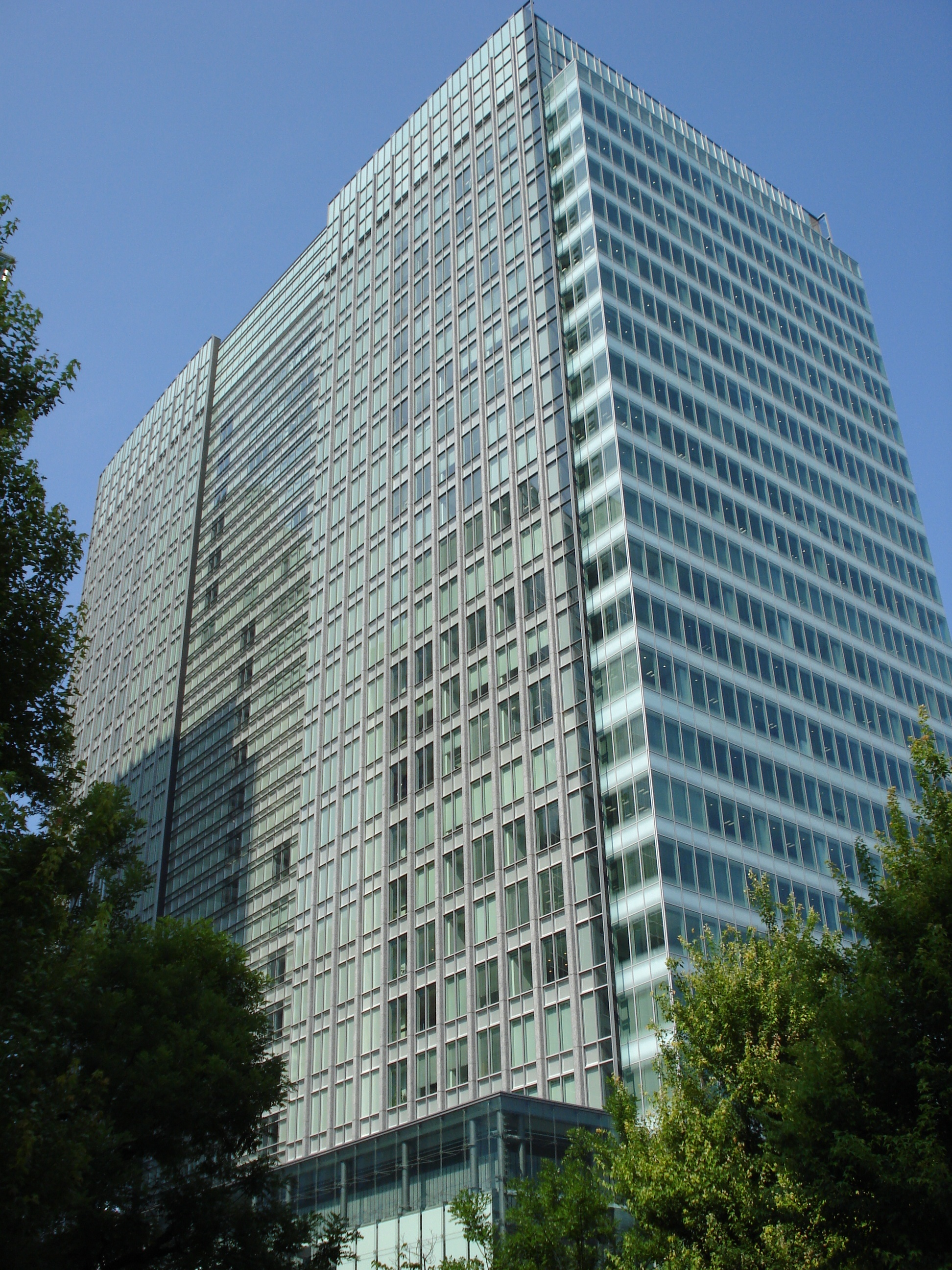
NTT Shiodome building

NTT Docomo Business, Inc. (NTTドコモビジネス株式会社, Enutiti Dokomo Bijinesu Kabushiki-gaisha), previously known as NTT Communications Corporation (エヌ・ティ・ティ・コミュニケーションズ株式会社, Enutiti Komyunikēshonzu Kabushiki-gaisha) is a Japanese telecommunications company owned by NTT. It operates an international network across over 190 countries and regions, with locations in more than 70 countries and regions. The company has approximately 5,500 employees (NTT Communications Group: 11,500 employees) as of March 2020. Its headquarters are located in the Otemachi Place West tower, Otemachi, Chiyoda, Tokyo.

NTT Communications Corporation was founded in July 1999 as a subsidiary of Nippon Telegraph and Telephone Corporation. NTT Communications provides network management, telecommunication services such as VPN, and communications technology (ICT) services including cloud, consulting, and managing services for companies and government agencies.

== History ==
=== Establishment and early years (1996–2005) ===
In 1996, several new policies were issued for the Telecommunications Law, and as a result of this policy change, NTT Communications Corporation was established in July 1999. Since then, Nippon Telegraph and Telephone Corporation (日本電信電話株式会社, Nippon Denshin Denwa Kabushiki-gaisha) has served as a parent company, controlling NTT Communications which is responsible for long-distance and worldwide telephone services and two other local telecom companies.

In 2000, the firm launched new international services called “0033 SAMURAI Mobile”, which were intended to allow users to make an international phone call with reduced international calling fees. Moreover, the firm began Data center services both within Japan and overseas to provide support for E-business conducted by corporations.

On 1 March 2001, NTT Com accepted a license agreement with InterWise, a major provider of live electronic learning and services for software-based enterprises. Due to the agreement, NTT Communications could offer the InterWise system to their customers as a cross-corporation service. From this, the company was able to expand its presence in the electronic learning market by using technology developed by InterWise to encourage information sharing besides development of corporations.

In December 2003, NTT Communications took over operations from a major data communications services provider; Crosswave Communications Inc. (CWC), which had filed for bankruptcy. In addition, NTT Communications reached an agreement to acquire CWC for approximately 10 billion yen, NTT Communications PM Suzuki said.

On 3 October 2005, the company won the Best Customer Care award at the World Communication Awards 2005 held in London, becoming the first Asian company to earn the award in the communication field.

=== Expansion (2006–2015) ===
In 2006, NTT Communications started a new Open Computer Network, also known as OCN Hosting Service, serving mainly small and medium-sized enterprises domestically.

In May 2011, NTT purchased 70% of Frontline Systems, an Australian IT services provider. In October 2013, it merged Frontline Systems with NTT Australia to form NTT ICT.

On 17 July 2013, the world's first 100 Gbit/s Ethernet technology on a cable system linking Japan and the United States was deployed by NTT Communications. The technology could enhance the capacity of the company's system by 2.5 times.

On 2 December 2014, the company, NTT Group's ICT services, and associated international communications, won the World Communications Awards (WCA) Best Global Operator award, in which the prize is generally given to those who innovate and provide great customer experiences.

=== 2016–present ===
In October 2017, Gartner Inc. positioned NTT Communications Corp. in the Leaders quadrant in the “Magic Quadrant for Managed Hybrid Cloud Hosting (MHCH), Asia/Pacific” for the third consecutive year.

On 28 May 2020, the firm announced the possibility of information leakage because of unauthorized access, however, no information related to consumer customers was disclosed. According to the official website, "on May 28 that some information—although no information on consumer customers—was possibly leaked externally on May 11 due to unauthorized access to NTT Com facilities by attackers on May 7."

On October 25, 2021, NTT Docomo announced that it was acquiring NTT Communications and NTT Comware. The Acquisition was completed on January 1, 2022. The two companies were renamed to NTT Docomo Business and NTT Docomo Solutions.

== NTT Group ==
The holding company Nippon Telegraph and Telephone Corporation (called NTT) was founded in 1952. Initially the parent company operated as a public telecommunications provider in the country, since inception, the corporation has widely expanded its services and network. As of March 31, 2020, 319,050 people work for NTT Group as a whole, and consolidated operating revenues and that of income are ¥11,899.4 billion and ¥1,562.2 billion respectively. Nippon Telegraph and Telephone group currently contains multiple corporations, and these are operated in different kinds of technological fields.

Mobile communications business

- NTT DOCOMO, INC.: One of the largest mobile communications companies in Japan, that has expanded its domestic mobile internet market by adopting strategies based on community management principles.

Regional communications business – mostly providing regional telecom operations in domestic and related business.

- NTT East Corporation:The firm provides long-distance and international communication services, cable TV business etc.
- NTT West Corporation: Generally, NTT West Corporation offers similar services with NTT East Corporation, however in another area. Moreover, West Corporation has entered into overseas markets.

Long distance and, global or cross-border communications business – both of the following firms provide products and services as well as long-distance communication services including cloud services, network services, data center services, and so forth.

- NTT Ltd.: Global operating company
- NTT Communications Corporation: Japan operating company

Data communications business

- NTT Data: NTT Group established a data communications bureau in 1967 which is now known as NTT DATA Corporation and currently, the firm offers its services in both Japan and overseas. Its main business activity is system integration, as well as network system services. They specialize in the development of wide-ranging custom systems.

== International market ==
Israel

In January 2002, NTT Communications invested around $1 million for a unique technology developed by Israel in order to expand their international services. The new technology has the ability to transfer audio or video files while connecting people in different locations.

India

The Israeli technology was used for a new service targeting corporate customers. NTT Communications started offering the service in India in two months. In June 2015, NTT Com's subsidiary NTT Communications India Private Limited (known as NTT Com India) built two new branch offices in Ahmedabad and Guiarat in order to deliver its customers ICT solutions.

Germany

The article "NTT Communications: PoP" describes that "NTT Communications ... announced it has deepened its network connectivity in Germany with a new Point of Presence (PoP) on its Tier-1 Global IP Network in Munich." The POPs could offer Tier-1 networking, allowing the company to deliver its customers network connections with high speed and low latency.

China and Hong Kong

Financial Data Center Tower 2 (FDC2), which is the first data center in the countries was established by NTT Communications with the purpose of minimizing the data center costs and enhancing the efficiency of data center energy in an eco-friendly way. As examples of energy efficient innovative technologies, cooling walls and batteries and water-side economization are included, and FDC2 has used renewable energy sources such as solar power by installing solar panels to the data center and has incorporated other ecological facilities like smart lighting systems for energy saving. FDC2 has reduced 60% of energy consumption every year, leading NTT Groups’ eco strategies.

Malaysia, the Philippines, Singapore, and Hong Kong

NTT Com launched a new operation called Asia Submarine-cable Express (ASE), an undersea cable connecting multiple large Asian cities with 40 Gbit/s on 20 August 2012. The company has invested heavily in ASE, which has been built in cooperation with several Asian firms such as Telekom Malaysia, Philippines-based PLDT, and StarHub based in Singapore. The leading points for the cable system have been constructed in Japan, Malaysia, the Philippines, and Singapore and Hong Kong was added in early 2013. The direct connection between the countries allows customers in five countries to use the data centers and cloud services as well as the network provided by NTT Com.

== Partnerships ==
Dimension Data

NTT Communications contracted with Dimension Data to create a provider called “cloud powerhouse”, which allows the companies to provide their clients a solution with hybrid IT. The alliance will also encourage access to worldwide software-based network services, connecting more than 190 countries and approximately 140 global data centers.

Mitsui Chemicals Inc.

The two companies presented a new prediction technology, using deep learning-based artificial intelligence (AI) which were developed by NTT Communication. According to the article "Deep-learning-based", "The predictions are produced in just 20 minutes after sampling process data, by modeling the relationships between process data and raw material, and furnace conditions, using deep-learning-based artificial intelligence (AI) developed by NTT Communications."

Geminare

NTT Communications expanded its service called “Disaster Recovery as a Service (DRaaS)” across the European network market, allowing corporate customers to develop their disaster recovery business by using the enterprise cloud platform. Originally, NTT Communication's DRaaS service was already available in the United States, however, the number of corporations incorporating disaster recovery service was expected to exceed the counterpart using conventional recovery services, in other words, there was a higher possibility of increasing the demand for disaster recovery service. Thus, NTT Communications decided to launch their DRaaS solutions in Europe with the support of Geminare.

Arkadin

In the 2010s, both NTT Communications and a collaboration services provider “Arkadin” have expanded their partnership in order to offer video conferencing to Japanese organizations and businesses, primarily for multinational clients based in the country.

== Sponsorships ==
Sports

- NTT Communications has sponsored a rugby team NTT Communications Shining Arcs (commonly called as the Shining Arcs) which is presently playing in a rugby competition “Japan Rugby League One”.
- The company signed a sponsorship deal with McLaren as a Technology Partner in July 2016.

Theme park

- NTT Communications has sponsored one of the rides in Tokyo Disneyland, Peter Pan's Flight, which is themed to the Peter Pan's world.
- Also, the company has presented a ride in Tokyo DisneySea called Jasmine's Flying Carpets which is a ride attraction about the Disney movie Aladdin.

Event

- A network operator enterprise in North America, NANOG, has been sponsored by NTT Communications, and NTT Com agreed to support NANOG's three specific events including NANOG 70 held in Bellevue, Washington from 5 to 7 June 2018, NANOG71 scheduled in San Jose, California on 2–4 October and NANOG 72 which took place from 5 to 7 February in Atlanta, Georgia.

== See also ==
- Open Computer Network
- Telegraph
- Telephone
- Verio
