= Sonos Five =

Sonos smart speaker

Sonos Play:5
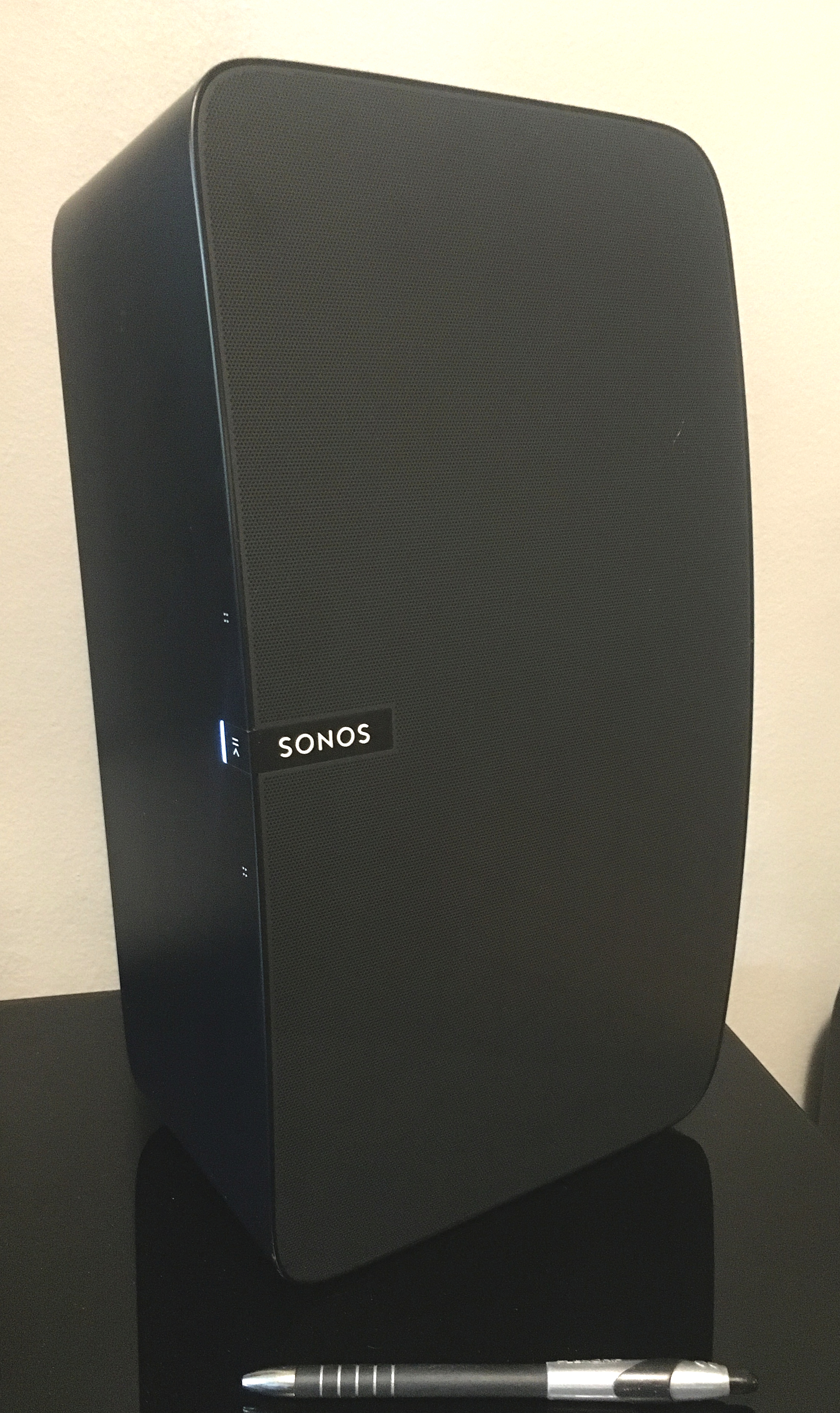
- The second generation Play:5 in its black color option. The pen is for size comparison.
- Also known as: Play:5
- Developer: Sonos
- Manufacturer: Sonos
- Product family: Play
- Type: Smart speaker
- Generation: 3
- Released: November 5, 2009
- Platform: Sonos Controller
- Dimensions: 8.03 in × 14.33 in × 6.06 in (204 mm × 364 mm × 154 mm)
- Weight: 14 lb (6.4 kg)
- Website: play5.sonos.com

The Sonos Five (originally branded as the ZonePlayer S5 and later as the Play:5) is a smart speaker developed by Sonos. It was first introduced on October 13, 2009, and released on November 5, 2009, as the debut product in the Sonos Play line. The speaker has evolved through three generations, with the first two branded as the Play:5 and the third, launched in June 2020, rebranded as the Sonos Five. Known for its high-quality audio and multi-room capabilities, the Sonos Five supports SonosNet, pairs with other Sonos products for stereo and home theater setups, and incorporates features like Trueplay tuning to optimize sound based on room acoustics.

== History ==
The ZonePlayer S5, originally what the Play:5 was branded, was introduced on October 13, 2009 and released on November 5. In May 2010, Sonos released a software update that allowed the speaker to initiate a stereo pair with another ZonePlayer S5 and was given improvements, such as crossfading and an alarm. In June, a black color option for the speaker was made available and the device was made available in Singapore. In August 2011, Sonos started referring to the S5 as the Play:5.

In July 2012, Sonos Studio announced the "Light House", an interactive structure that was paired with the Play:3 and sub speakers and was hosted by The Crystal Method. In September 2014, another software update gave the Play:5, plus the Play:3, Play:1 and Playbar independence to run SonosNet through Wi-Fi without connecting a Bridge, Boost or itself by Ethernet to a router following a public beta test for the feature. In September 2015, Sonos announced the redesigned, second-generation Play:5 alongside the tuning software, Trueplay.

In June 2020, Sonos introduced the Sonos Five, which replaced the Play:5 as the third generation of the series.^{[1]} While retaining a similar external design, the Sonos Five featured updated internal components, including increased memory, enhanced processing power, and a new wireless radio.^{[2]} The speaker is equipped with six Class-D amplifiers, three tweeters, and three mid-woofers, providing studio-quality sound.^{[3]} It supports Wi-Fi, Apple AirPlay 2, and includes a 3.5mm line-in port for connecting external devices, but it does not feature Bluetooth or built-in microphones for voice control.^{[4]} Trueplay tuning technology allows the Sonos Five to optimize sound based on room acoustics.^{[5]}

== Features ==
The speaker is able to use Wi-Fi independently for itself or a Boost via Ethernet to run SonosNet, a peer-to-peer mesh network which allows the user to play media on some, one or all speakers connected to the network. It also can establish a stereo pair with another Play:5 to create a separate left and right audio channel and can pair additionally with a playbar or sub to create a home theater system.

== Design ==
=== Hardware ===
The Play:5 is the current luxury model of the Play line of products, with the first generation having two tweeters and drivers plus a subwoofer, with 5 Class-D amplifiers. However, the second generation has three tweeters and mid-woofers, with 6 Class-D amplifiers, in a phased array. Like its brother products, it also has an Ethernet port. It is the only Play speaker that has a headphone jack, two microphones and an AUX port, and is the second in the lineup to house an LED indicator alongside the Play:3.

=== Software ===
Sonos Controller sets up and controls the speaker only. All third and first-party apps are incompatible with the speakers. Furthermore, other music services such as Spotify, Apple Music, Tidal, Pandora and others can be connected to the app and streamed through the Play:5.

== Reception ==
The Play:5 has been positively received by critics. The first generation was praised for its ease of access, sound and design, but criticized its limited functionality and then-software. CNET praised the first-generation, stating that "puts it somewhere between the Bose SoundDock II and the larger SoundDock 10.". Will Smith of Tested criticized its price and was befuddled at its inclusion of a headphone jack, but stated that "The S5 is a great addition to the Sonos product line. However, if you haven't already bought into the Sonos vision of total-home music, it may not be the best fit." What Hi-Fi? concluded also that "Although this partnership results in great sound, some would see it as excessively pricey and large for a bedroom, kitchen or study." "Pricing is our only concern with the Sonos Zoneplayer S5 and its family of products" was also a concern from GoodGearGuide. In a less positive review, PC Magazine said "simply put, this is the cheapest way for current iPod touch and iPhone owners to enter the seamless world of home audio streaming that Sonos provides."

The second generation received more praise. Critics praised its increase in audio quality, with CNET noting that "this speaker appears to be about 20 to 25 percent bigger than the previous Play:5 and it delivers significantly more bass" and Engadget also concluded that it "the Play:5 is the best speaker Sonos has ever made." PCMag also gave the second generation an Editor's Choice, and that "from a multi-room home audio standpoint, Sonos still leads the pack." Tom's Guide derided the speaker for not having Bluetooth support and exclusivity to Sonos' software, but favored its design, quality and praised its stereo pairing. The Guardian criticized the stereo pair for "almost [being] too loud at times, particularly if you’re looking for background music at night for reading" but gave the Play:5 a positive review nevertheless.
