= Cirquent =

- Company type: GmbH
- Industry: IT, Consulting and Professional services
- Founded: 1971 (as Softlab)
- Defunct: 2012
- Fate: Acquired by NTT Data
- Headquarters: Munich, Germany
- Key people: Thomas Balgheim, Chairman; Bernd Stroppel
- Products: Consultancy Services
- Revenue: ▲€216 million (2009)
- Number of employees: about 1.600 (2009)
- Website: www.cirquent.com

Cirquent (formerly Softlab Group) was a subsidiary of NTT Data that provides IT, consulting and professional services. The company's headquarters were in Munich, Germany, with offices in Austria, Switzerland and the UK. The company specialized in developing custom software, integrating third-party systems, and providing consulting services.

== History ==
Cirquent Ltd, a fully owned subsidiary of Cirquent GmbH, was founded in the UK, as Softlab Ltd., in 1989, to sell and support the Maestro I product line. Initially based in Hammersmith, the company expanded with the launch of Maestro II, a software development environment used by British Gas plc and Barclays Bank.

Softlab was purchased by BMW AG in the 1990s and following the purchase of Rover Group by BMW, Softlab Ltd. acquired AT&T Istel's Rover Group services, increasing in size from about 60 staff to one of over 500. With the acquisition came a move of headquarters near Birmingham. The business moved from software tools to CRM and Contact center system integration. In 2001, BMW Group sold Rover, and soon after the automotive team was sold to Computer Sciences Corporation.

Softlab continued to focus on CRM software and contact centre projects, partnering with Microsoft (Dynamics CRM), Oracle (Siebel), Genesys, Interactive Intelligence, CDC (Pivotal) and BMC (Remedy).Other customers include Allianz Germany, BMW Group, Deutsche Börse, Heidelberger Druckmaschinen, Kabel Deutschland, Munich Re, O2, and T-Mobile.

=== Acquisition and consolidation ===
Following acquisitions, in 2008, Softlab was rebranded as Cirquent. Later that year, NTT Data acquired a majority stake in Cirquent. In 2012, Cirquent was consolidated under the NTT Data brand.
