= Sonos Studio =

Former art gallery in Los Angeles, United States

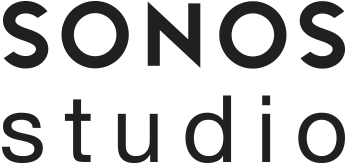
- Established: May 9, 2012; 14 years ago
- Location: Los Angeles
- Type: Art gallery; Studio
- Owner: Sonos
- Website: https://www.sonos.com/

Sonos Studio is an art gallery and studio in Los Angeles, United States, established on May 9, 2012, and owned by American consumer electronics company Sonos. The studio has also had temporary pop-up locations in New York City, London, and Amsterdam.

In 2016, the Los Angeles studio permanently closed its event space to the public. Today, the space operates as a production studio and private showroom.

== Overview ==
The original gallery combined collections of Sonos wireless speakers, art, and technology, but also hosted musicians in certain events where a band or solo artist performed at the location. The admission, as well as other supplies, were free of charge. The building is acoustically tuned and refined to house the products and improve experience within initiation of the exhibit.

== History ==
After the creation of Sonos in 2002 and its corporate growth and increasing popularity, the Sonos Studio was established on May 9, 2012, in Los Angeles, which was inaugurated with Center of Attention, an interactive exhibit and show by Luke Fishbeck. The xx constructed an installation called Missing to promote Coexist in November. In February 2013, Beck held an event at the gallery to promote Song Reader, complete with modular synthesizers and other instruments to play the songs listed in the book. In July, Sonos collaborated with Softlab to create their "Light House" concept from July 25 to August 25, which was powered by Sonos Play:3, Play:5 and Sub smart speakers and was hosted by The Crystal Method initially. Sonos also debuted at the 2013 Amsterdam Dance Event in October for five days.

In February 2014, Schoolboy Q hosted a listening party at Sonos Studio for his Oxymoron release. Charli XCX also hosted an event in June. In September, Blue Note Records had a pop-up store in the gallery with partnership with Amoeba Music. From September 30 to October 5, Sonos Studio was set up and configured in New York City It hosted events such as An Evening with Danny Brown, hosted by Danny Brown and presented by Sonos and Pandora, an interactive map of New York City made out of 300 Play:1 speakers and four Sub, in which 180 of the speakers were reconfigured to hold LED lighting, custom-made speakers using Autodesk products and Sonos components and an installation called Ancient Chaos, built by Dev Hynes and The Principals.

In January 2015, Sonos created an exhibition called Sound Affects: Music and Mood, an interactive experience in which to study a person's intersection with music. In July, Miguel promoted Wildheart at the gallery, while also teasing a new song albeit not performing it. In October, Sonos Studio also opened for three days at the 2015 Amsterdam Dance Event and officially opened the Studio in London at the same month. In January 2016, the Studio in Los Angeles hosted its last public event with a performance by The Gaslamp Killer.
