= Christiane Floyd =

Austrian computer scientist

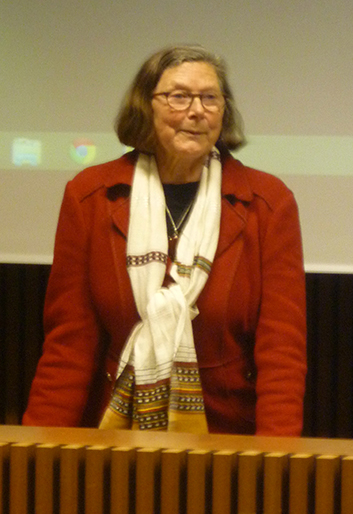
- Floyd speaking at a conference at the HTW Berlin on 31 March 2015
- Born: Christiane Riedl; 26 April 1943 (age 83); Vienna, Austria
- Education: University of Vienna
- Spouses: Robert W. Floyd; Peter Naur
- Scientific career
- Fields: Computer science
- Workplaces: University of Hamburg; Technische Universität Berlin; Softlab; Stanford University; Siemens
- Thesis: Radikale für Fastmoduln, Fastringe und Kompositionsringe (1966)
- Doctoral advisor: Wilfried Nöbauer

Christiane Floyd (née Riedl; born 26 April 1943) is an Austrian computer scientist. In 1978, she accomplished becoming the very first female professor of computer science in Germany, and was a pioneer of evolutionary participatory software design—a precursor to open-source software development.

== Biography ==
Born Christiane Riedl, she began her career studying mathematics at the University of Vienna, where she completed her PhD in 1966. From 1966 to 1968, she worked as a systems programmer using an ALGOL 60 compiler at Siemens in Munich, Germany. From 1968 to 1973, she worked at the computer science department of Stanford University in the United States as a research associate and part-time lecturer.

In 1973, she joined the Munich software development company Softlab, where she worked as a senior consultant and was involved in the development and demonstration of Maestro I, the first integrated development environment for software.

In 1978, Floyd became a full professor of software engineering at Technische Universität Berlin—the first woman to be a professor in the field of computer science in Germany. From 1991, she was head of the software engineering group at the University of Hamburg. Floyd and her group produced one of the first conceptual contributions to participatory design methods with the STEPS process model (Software Technology for Evolutionary Participatory Systems development). Floyd formally retired and became a professor emerita at Hamburg in 2008. She has since been involved with the Vienna University of Technology WIT project (Wissenschaftlerinnenkolleg Internettechnologien; Women's Postgraduate College for Internet Technologies), which offers a specialised PhD program for women in the computer science field. Floyd was granted an honorary professorship at TU Wien on 26 January 2012.

She was married to Robert W. Floyd and Peter Naur — both computer scientists and ACM Turing Award winners.
