= Sonos Ace =

American company

- Developer: Sonos
- Manufacturer: Sonos
- Type: Wireless over-ear headphones
- Released: June 5, 2024
- Connectivity: Bluetooth 5.4, USB-C
- Power: Rechargeable battery
- Weight: 312 g (11.0 oz)
- Successor: Sonos Ace Ultra

The Sonos Ace is a model of wireless over-ear headphones with active noise cancellation made by the American audio company Sonos. The Ace was the company's first pair of headphones, announced in May 2024 and released on June 5, 2024, at a price of US$449. Its TV Audio Swap feature sends sound from a Sonos soundbar to the headphones. Reviewers generally praised the comfort, design and noise cancellation, and criticized the price and the features missing at launch. The release coincided with a widely criticized redesign of the Sonos app. In September 2026, Sonos released a successor, the Sonos Ace Ultra.

== History ==
Reports that Sonos was working on headphones dated from before the COVID-19 pandemic. Sonos announced the Ace on May 21, 2024, and released it on June 5 in most of its markets at US$449, £449, €499 and A$699. The Verge described the headphones as the product Sonos customers had requested most.

The launch came shortly after a redesign of the Sonos app that drew widespread complaints from customers. Ars Technica, citing reporting by Bloomberg, wrote that Sonos had treated the new app as urgent because the Ace was built for use away from home Wi-Fi networks. The company had wanted the app out at least a few weeks ahead of the headphones. In October 2024, PhoneArena relayed a report by Bloomberg's Mark Gurman that Sonos had sold about 200,000 units through September 2024, against a goal of up to one million. By that account the company was weighing a price cut and a more expensive model.

In August 2024, Sonos extended TV Audio Swap to its Beam and Ray soundbars and to Android devices. A June 2025 software update added TrueCinema, a feature still in development at launch, along with the ability to send TV audio to two pairs of headphones at once and changes to the adaptive noise cancellation.

The Sonos Ace Ultra was announced on September 1, 2026, and went on sale on September 29 at the same US$449 price. It has a longer rated battery life, more microphones and the ability to link with other Sonos products, which the original model lacked.

== Design and features ==
The Ace uses custom 40 mm dynamic drivers and eight microphones, four in each ear cup, and weighs 312 g. The memory-foam ear cushions attach magnetically, the headband has stainless-steel sliders, and the headphones were sold in black and white. They are controlled with physical buttons.

Battery life is rated at up to 30 hours with noise cancellation on. A three-minute charge gives about three hours of playback. The Ace connects over Bluetooth 5.4, supports multipoint, and handles the SBC, AAC and aptX Adaptive codecs, with aptX Lossless on compatible Android phones. It also carries lossless audio over USB-C and supports Dolby Atmos spatial audio with head tracking.

TV Audio Swap uses a Wi-Fi radio inside the headphones, but the Ace cannot stream music over Wi-Fi or join a group of Sonos speakers. At launch it worked only with the Arc soundbar and needed an iOS device to set up. The headphones do not fold and carry no water-resistance rating. iFixit scored them 5 out of 10 for repairability, though the battery can be replaced.

== Reception ==
Chris Welch of The Verge scored the Ace 7 out of 10 and felt it had been rushed out. He liked the comfort, design, controls and transparency mode, but not the app, an unreliable TV Audio Swap handoff or the inability to group it with Sonos speakers. Wired went higher, at 8 out of 10, for the comfort, noise cancellation and sound, though it flagged the price and bugs in the new app. Engadget rated it 85 out of 100 and called it "an impressive but incomplete debut", with noise cancellation that fell short of Bose and Sony. Samuel Gibbs of The Guardian called it "worth the wait", if heavier than the lightest rivals. RTINGS.com rated its noise isolation highly and its sound warm. Gizmodo found the price too high for what shipped at launch. Digital Trends recommended it but flagged wind noise and limited equalizer settings.

Engadget revisited the Ace in July 2025 after the TrueCinema update and wrote that it was finally fulfilling its potential, with a score that would have been higher at launch had the feature shipped.
