= AJENTS =

System information
- Full name: AJENTS; ATS
- Machine type: Travel agency machine
- Type of ticket stock: Computer paper (continuous feed)
- Manufacturer: Standard PC can be used with an Epson-compatible printer

History
- First introduced: Mid-1990s
- Machine number range: N/A
- Window number range: N/A

Locations/areas/train operating companies
- Current users: A variety of travel agencies independent of the TOCs

AJENTS (sometimes known as ATS - "Agency Ticket System") is one of the two original computer-based railway ticket issuing systems supplied to travel agencies in Britain. It allows agencies which are not connected to one of the major GDS (Global Distribution System) networks to issue and print railway tickets from a standard personal computer, and submit revenue and accounting data securely to Rail Settlement Plan Ltd for allocation to the appropriate train operating companies.

== System details ==
In contrast to ELGAR, which is fully integrated with all four major GDS systems and provides a complete ticket-issuing, reservation, printing and accounting system and interface, AJENTS is a standalone issuing mechanism, powered by a single software application, that requires only a PC with a dot-matrix printer and special thin card ticket stock.

Having been introduced in the mid-1990s, the PC system requirements for AJENTS are relatively low:

- Microsoft Windows 95, 98 or NT 4.0
- Processor speed: 300 MHz
- RAM: 32 MB
- Hard drive capacity: 1 GB
- Modem: 56 kbit/s
- Dot matrix printer: Epson compatible 24-pin unit with at least an 80-column carriage width. The Epson LQ-300 and LQ-570+ printers have been identified by ATOC as being ideal.

The software works by placing an image of the ticket on the computer's monitor, so that each text field can be filled in via the keyboard before it is printed. A colour monitor of reasonable size (at least 15") is therefore recommended as well, as is a CD-Rom drive (for the software and any update information).

== Ticket stock ==
Fan-fold, partly pre-printed ticket stock is produced on perforated thin card, for use in the dot matrix printers. It has tractor feed holes on detachable perforated strips on both sides. In British Rail days, the form reference of the stock was BR 4403/44; since privatisation, a slightly different layout has been used with code RSP 4404/46. The code is printed near the bottom left corner of the front of the ticket.

== Relationship to other systems ==
AJENTS works with the ISTEL reservation booking system, and the RailPlanner journey-planning software. There is no direct link into the Central Reservation System (CRS) for seat reservation bookings, or to the Rail Journey Information Service (RJIS), which was developed for the rail industry in 1998 as the centralised, standard data "hub" for all information relating to journey planning and booking: timetables, fare tables, valid routes, card authorisation and similar. This means that, in most cases, variables such as fares and valid routes have to be checked manually at the time the ticket is booked, usually by using printed manuals and guidebooks. (AJENTS does hold a simple database of the "Top 50" fares for the most popular combinations of origin and destination, however).

There is a system in place for sales and revenue data to be sent automatically to Rail Settlement Plan Ltd, via a secure e-mail address.

== The future ==
ATOC currently provides the AJENTS system to travel agents directly. However, as part of a strategic move away from direct provision in favour of an "open market" where agencies obtain their preferred system directly from suppliers, AJENTS will no longer be provided or supported (by either ATOC or a third party) after 31 December 2007. Suppliers are already developing "New Generation" systems with full integration into the CRS and RJIS (notably Travelport UK Rail and the Evolvi system), and ATOC is working with them to assist their entry into the market.

== See also ==
- Travel technology
