= John Leighfield =

British businessman (born 1938)

John Percival Leighfield
- Born: April 5, 1938 (age 87); Oxford, United Kingdom
- Occupation: Business executive
- Years active: 1962-2007
- Known for: British IT industry businessman

John Percival Leighfield CBE (born 1938) is a British IT industry businessman who established and led ISTEL in the 1980s and early 1990s. He was chairman of RM plc from 1993 until 2011.

In 2005, John Leighfield was appointed as a Director of Getmapping, a UK supplier of aerial photography, mapping products and data hosting solutions. He is also Chairman of Governors of the WMG Academy Trust (which operates two University technical colleges).

== Early life and education ==
John Leighfield was born in Oxford, England, and was a pupil at Magdalen College School. He then read Greats at Exeter College, Oxford. He has an MA from Oxford, Honorary Doctorates from the University of Central England in Birmingham (DUniv), from De Montfort University (DTech), from Wolverhampton University (DTech) and from the University of Warwick (DLL). He is a Fellow of the RSA, RGS, CMI, IET, and BCS.

== Career ==
Leighfield pursued a career in IT, initially in the 1960s with the Ford Motor Company, where he did pioneering work on computer systems in finance and manufacturing, Plessey (where he was head of management services) and British Leyland (from the early 1970s). In 1987, he led an employee buy out of Istel Ltd, which he had established as a subsidiary of British Leyland. In 1989, the company was subsequently taken over by AT&T. He was the executive chairman of AT&T Istel until April 1993.

In November 1993, he joined RM (a British educational computing company) as a non-executive director and in October 1994 became the non-executive chairman. He has been a non-executive director of a number of other companies as well, including Halifax plc and Synstar (of which he is also non-executive chairman).

Leighfield was president of the British Computer Society (1993–4) and the Computing Services and Software Association (1995–6). He is president of the Institute for the Management of Information Systems (IMIS), a UK professional association. He has been a member of the council of University of Warwick, chairman of the advisory board, and an honorary visiting professor at the Warwick Business School. He was pro-chancellor and chairman of the council at the University of Warwick from 2002 to 2011.

== Recognition ==
In the Queen's Birthday Honours 1998 Leighfield was appointed as a Commander of the Most Excellent Order of the British Empire. In 2006, Leighfield was awarded the Mountbatten Medal.

In 2005, he was appointed as a non-executive director of Getmapping and Master of the Worshipful Company of Information Technologists.

== Personal life ==
Leighfield lives in Oxford. He was formerly Chairman of the Governors of Magdalen College School. He is Chairman of the Oxford Philomusica Advisory Council, the Resident Professional Orchestra at the University of Oxford. In his spare time, he has an interest in maps, especially of Oxfordshire. He is married with children and grandchildren.

On 15 January 2016 Leighfield gave an in-depth interview to Alan Cane, Former Editor of the Financial Times, on his life and career for Archives of IT.
