= Sonos One =

Smart speaker with voice control built in

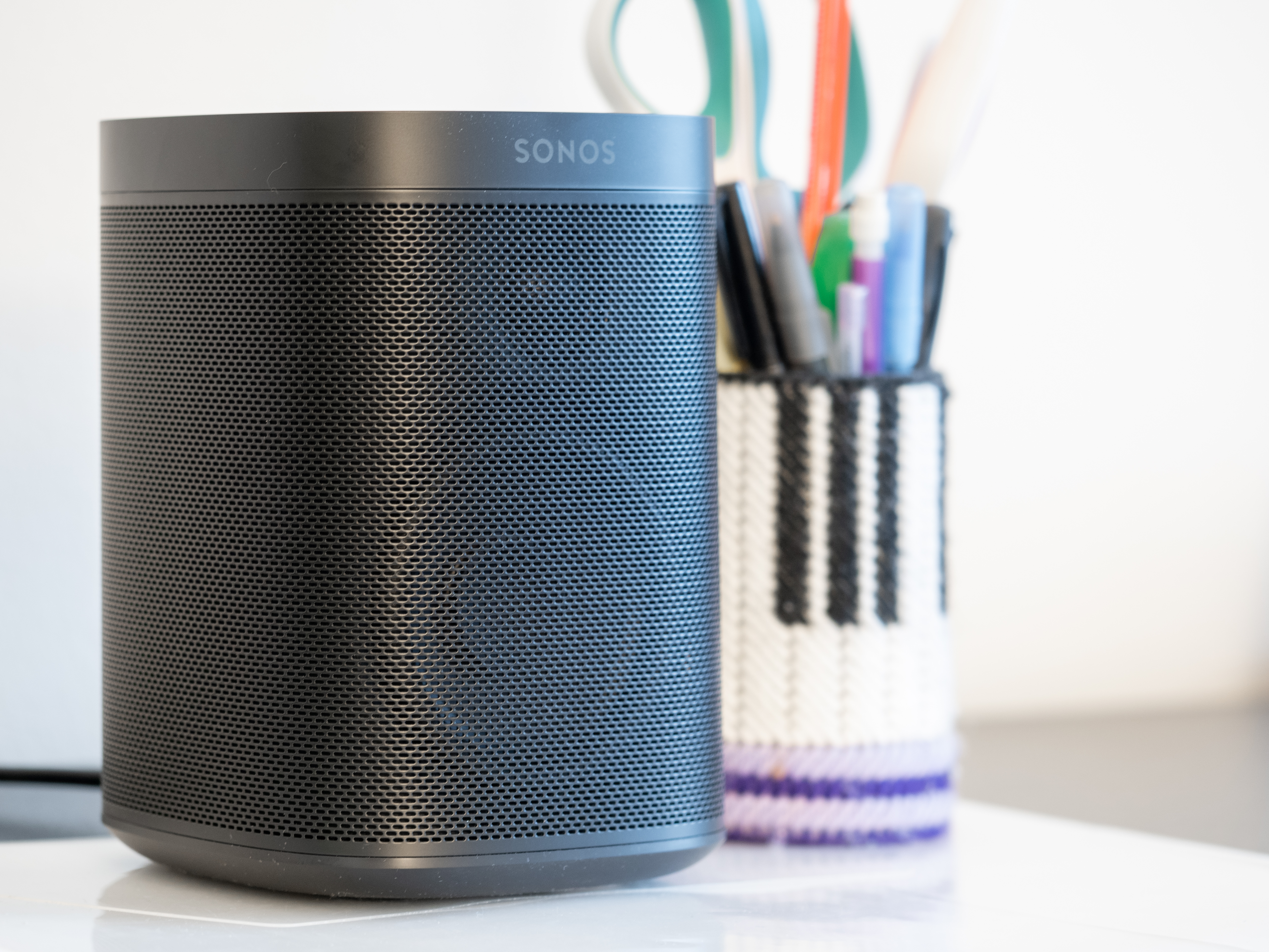
- Developer: Sonos
- Manufacturer: Sonos
- Type: Smart speaker
- Generation: 2
- Released: October 24, 2017
- Introductory price: $199 / £199 / €229
- Sound: 2 Class-D amplifiers, mid-woofer and tweeter
- Input: Sonos Controller; Voice; Volume and Play/Pause buttons
- Platform: Sonos Controller
- Dimensions: 6.4 in × 4.7 in × 4.7 in (16 cm × 12 cm × 12 cm)
- Weight: 4.08 lb (1,850 g)
- Predecessor: Sonos Play:1
- Successor: Sonos Era 100
- Website: sonos.com/en-us/shop/one

The Sonos One is a smart speaker developed by Sonos, announced on October 4, 2017 and released on October 24. The speaker contains a six-microphone array, allowing use of the virtual assistants, Amazon Alexa and Google Assistant. In 2018, the smart speaker added support for Apple's AirPlay 2.

Originally slated for 2018, Google Assistant integration was released in May 2019.

== Design ==
=== Hardware ===
The Sonos One features two Class-D amplifiers, a woofer, a tweeter, and six far-field microphones.
Running on a 64-bit motherboard, it is equipped with an AC and Ethernet port on the back of the speaker and is capable of 802.11b/g (Wi-Fi 3) Wi-Fi connection.
When connected to the network using Ethernet, the speaker can also act as a Sonos BOOST.

=== Software ===
The Sonos Controller app mainly controls and sets up the speaker, but can also connect other music services like Spotify, Amazon Music, Pandora Radio, and iHeartRadio through voice interaction. As with its predecessor, the speaker can link with SonosNet, a mesh network to play media for one, some or all speakers regardless of location. The speaker communicates with the companion app and music streaming services through Wi-Fi.

=== Sonos One Gen 2 ===
The second generation of the Sonos One increased the memory, added Bluetooth Low Energy (which can not be used for audio playback) and updated the processor. The three updates do not include any new features from the Gen 1s. Sonos states that the original Ones will continue to support all current features but the Gen 2 may allow them to add new experiences that the Gen 1 will not be able to support. The Gen 1 and Gen 2 will work as a stereo pair and look and sound the same. The only visual difference is the branding on the bottom of the Gen 2. Gen 2 supports 802.11ac (Wi-Fi 5) connectivity.

=== Sonos One SL ===
In addition to the Gen 2, Sonos released the One SL in September 2019. Based on the outside design and its functionality the SL version is the same as the Gen 2 but without microphones, making it incompatible with Alexa or Google Assistant. It is not known if the One and the One SL have the same internal electronics and speaker units, so the quality could be different. The SL is intended as the replacement for the Play:1 speakers and addresses the concerns that some users have with smart technology.
