= Play:3 =

Smart speaker model

Sonos Play:3
- Also known as: Play:3
- Developer: Sonos
- Manufacturer: Sonos
- Product family: Play
- Type: Smart speaker
- Released: July 20, 2011
- Discontinued: July 31, 2018
- Sound: 3 Class-D amplifiers, tweeter, two mid-woofers and a bass radiator
- Input: Sonos Controller; Volume, mute and control buttons
- Platform: Sonos Controller
- Dimensions: 5.2 in × 10.6 in × 6.3 in (130 mm × 270 mm × 160 mm)
- Weight: 5.71 lb (2.59 kg)

The Play:3 (branded as the PLAY:3) is a smart speaker developed by Sonos, announced and released on July 20, 2011, as the second product in the Play line of products. It is the first Sonos product to be able to be positioned vertically as well as one of the compatible speakers able to run SonosNet, establish a stereo pair with its counterpart and pair additionally with the Playbar and/or Sub to initiate a basic home theater system.

The speaker was officially announced and released in July 2011, around the same month that Spotify was added to Sonos' catalog of music services. It was used by The xx at the Sonos Studio in November 2013, and again by Sonos in collaboration with Softlab for their "Light House" installation in the same place in July 2013 and was headed by The Crystal Method. It was also given a firmware update, alongside the Play:1, Play:5 and Playbar, in which the Play:3 could initiate SonosNet without linking a Bridge or Boost to a router in September 2014. It was also given compatibility with Trueplay in September 2015 and was given public beta support to Spotify Connect in November 2016. Sonos ended production of the Play:3 on July 31, 2018, while maintaining updates and service for the discontinued speaker.

== History ==
The Play:3 was announced and officially released on July 20, 2011 and Spotify was added to Sonos' catalog of music services later that month and MOG in May. It was used by the Sonos Studio later in November 2012 and July 2013, when The xx used the Play:3 and other Sonos speakers to develop Missing, an installation made to promote Coexist, and in the "Light House", another installation made in partnership with Softlab that was from July 25 to August 25, and was headlined by The Crystal Method.

In May 2013, Noah and the Whale screened a short film entitled Heart of Nowhere after their album of the same name in the Sonos Studio, in which audio was played through a Playbar, Sub and two Play:3s all connected to a Bridge. 8tracks was added to the Sonos catalog on July, and 3 pairs of Play:3s were given away as part of the initiation of the service. In September 2014, alongside the Play:1, Play:5 and Playbar, the speaker was given a firmware update in which it could now run SonosNet independently through Wi-Fi instead of connecting to a Bridge device. In September 2015, the Trueplay service was made available for all Sonos speakers through another update. In November 2016, all Sonos speakers were given public beta support for Spotify's Connect service. On July 31, 2018, Sonos ended production of the Play:3 and discontinued selling the speaker.

== Features ==
The Play:3 speakers was the first Sonos speaker to be able to propped vertically. Because of this, the speaker also includes a 1/4 threaded mount on the back that allows it to be mounted to a stand. Like the Play:1 and Play:5, the speaker also has the ability to stereo pair, a feature that links the speaker to another Play:3 to issue a separate left and right channel for audio and can be further paired with a Playbar and Sub to form a basic home theater system.

It is compatible with SonosNet, a peer-to-peer mesh network that allows multiple speakers to be connected together and for media to be played on separate or all connected speakers. The speaker can either use Wi-Fi or can connect to a Bridge, Boost or itself by Ethernet to a router to run the network. The speaker can be acoustically tuned using Trueplay, which uses a smartphone to tune the speaker based on its measurement, while the speaker tunes automatically as the user walks around to complete initiation.

== Design ==
=== Hardware ===
The Play:3 is the mid-range speaker of the Play speakers in the product line, bearing 3 Class-D amplifiers, a tweeter, two mid-woofers and a bass radiator. This makes it more capable of playback than the Play:1, which has 2 Class-D amplifiers and a tweeter and mid-woofer, but significantly inferior to the Play:5, which boasts three tweeters, three mid-woofers and six amplifiers. It also contains a pair of Ethernet ports and volume and control buttons.

The speaker houses a single-board, powered by a low-power, powered largely by a 266 MHz MPC8314VRADDA PowerQUICC II Pro processor. Qualcomm Atheros AR9380 single-chip with three-stream, SST3 802.11a/b/g/n connectivity and a Skyworks SE2595L dual-band 802.11n WLAN front end provides the Wi-Fi connectivity.

=== Software ===
Sonos Controller initially sets up the speaker and controls it, but other services like Google Play, Spotify, Apple Music, TuneIn and others can also be connected to the software and the user's account catalog can be played. Furthermore, third-party apps cannot connect to the speaker and playback must be through the app.

== Reception ==
The Play:3 has been positively received by critics. Charles Arthur of The Guardian praised the speaker for being intuitive and smart in its functionality, concluding that "The three-speaker system inside does a very impressive job: the sound doesn't have the "boxy" quality that so many small single-unit speakers can give." Terrence O'Brien of Engadget praised the speaker, but criticized the price and limited functionality of the then-Sonos Controller, stating that "it still leaves a lot to be desired" but concluded that "The Play:3 is more than adequate for casual listening. It's clear, loud, and punchy enough to start up a small dance party if need be. And, unless the units unpacked themselves, sprouted legs, and walked to where we wanted them, setting them up couldn't have been any easier." TechRadar stated that "unfortunately you do have to go through Sonos' proprietary software" but liked "the easy set up, the wealth of music options (digital radio, MP3s, Spotify, Last.fm etc.) and the size..." Comparing its success to Apple's AirPlay and other speakers, Wired gave a positive review and said that "its lower price is truly cause for elation for anyone wanting a no-fuss entry point into a home full of music" although that "yes, you’ll lose two drivers and a wee bit of clarity in the mid and upper ranges."
