= ISTEL =

- Formerly: BL Systems
- Company type: Subsidiary
- Industry: Information and communications technology
- Founded: 1979
- Founder: British Leyland
- Defunct: 1997
- Fate: Acquired
- Successor: AT&T and later Capgemini
- Headquarters: Redditch, England
- Key people: John Leighfield (CEO)
- Products: IT and telecommunication services to the automotive industry
- Owner: British Leyland and later AT&T and Softlab

ISTEL, formerly BL Systems, and latterly AT&T Istel, was a British information technology company that provided IT and telecommunications systems to the automotive industry during the 1980s and 1990s. It started as the IT services arm of car manufacturer British Leyland and later expanded to providing services to a number of rival automotive manufacturers.

== History ==
The company was formed in 1979 as BL Systems Limited (BLSL) through a merger of the computer departments of various automotive manufacturing companies brought together under the British Leyland (BL) umbrella. John Leighfield became the chairman of the new company, which, in addition to providing the computer resources and telecommunications services for the BL companies, gradually started to provide similar services for other outside companies. The company's headquarters were established in Redditch and Coventry. BL Systems pioneered many services, including the establishment of Europe's first microwave communications network in the late 1970s and launched Comet (originally a US product) that in 1981 was Britain's first commercial electronic mail service. In 1984 the company's name was changed to ISTEL.

The new company name was said to have been chosen by Leighfield randomly by combining pairs of syllables that sounded vaguely related to systems, telecommunications, or technology until he hit upon one he liked the sound of. By 1986 it was widely understood among staff to be an acronym for In Systems The Established Leader, some also noting that Information Systems and TELecommunications fitted quite nicely. In addition, the similarity with the name of a microchip manufacturer did not go unnoticed. The more waggish staff were known to say that the acronym stood for "Information Screwed, Twisted and Eventually Lost" or "I Stand To Earn Less".

In June 1987, Rover Group (to which British Leyland had been renamed in 1986) sold ISTEL, in a management buyout, to a consortium of its management and employees, and investors, led by John Leighfield, for £35 million.

In October 1989, ISTEL was sold to AT&T and was renamed AT&T Istel. Latterly it was documented that in 1997 AT&T quietly dropped the Istel name putting its finance, commerce, travel, and healthcare divisions up for sale. Customers included Citibank, Delta Air Lines, Barclays, Texaco, British Oxygen, Boots and Post Office Limited. The healthcare division was sold to Atlanta-based company HBO & Company. In 1998 the company's finance and banking division was sold to Capgemini. In April 1998 AT&T sold the Automotive Division, the original core of ISTEL, to BMW's in house software house, Softlab. In April 2001, following BMW's sale of Rover Group to the Phoenix Consortium the previous year, Softlab sold a significant part of its UK operations, specifically the automotive facing sections, on to Computer Sciences Corporation.
