= Play:1 =

Smart speaker model

Sonos PLAY:1
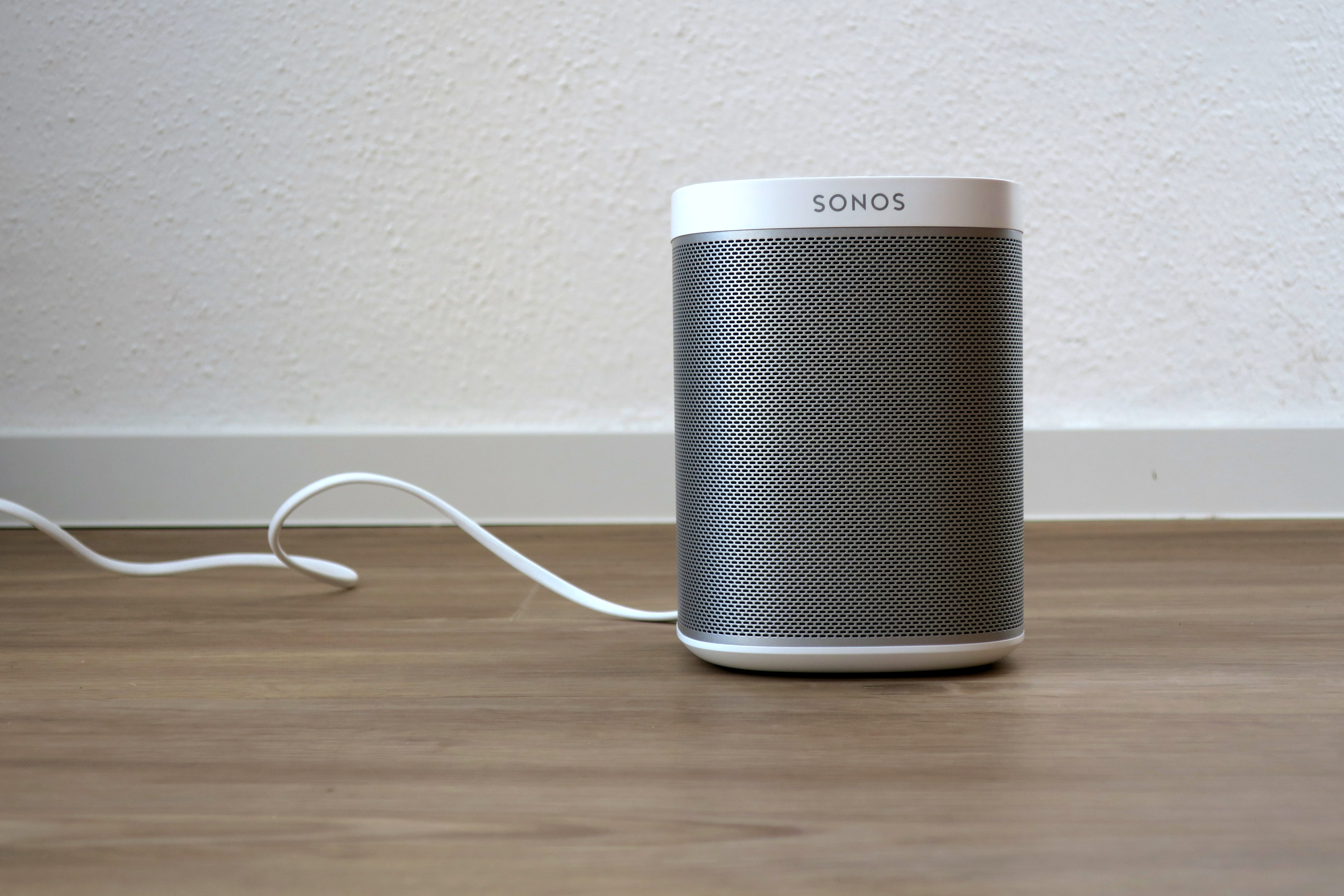
- The Play 1 in white, with the power cord extended, facing towards the front.
- Also known as: Play:1
- Developer: Sonos
- Manufacturer: Sonos
- Product family: Play
- Type: Smart speaker
- Released: October 14, 2013
- Sound: 2 Class-D amplifiers, mid-woofer and tweeter
- Input: Sonos Controller; Volume and Play/Pause buttons
- Platform: Sonos Controller
- Dimensions: 6.4 in × 4.7 in × 4.7 in (16 cm × 12 cm × 12 cm)
- Weight: 1kg/1000g
- Successor: Sonos One
- Website: play1.sonos.com

The Play:1 (branded as the PLAY:1) is a smart speaker developed by Sonos, announced and released on October 14, 2013, as the fourth and least expensive product in the Play line of speakers. It is one of the compatible speakers that can also link in SonosNet, a mesh network that can interlink speakers to play media for one, some or all speakers regardless of location.

The specifications of the product were released by the FCC in September 2014. It was to market released in October 2014.

Two limited editions of the speaker, the Blue Note Play:1, which was a collaboration with Blue Note Records for its 75th anniversary, and the Tone Play:1 were released in both March and July 2015 respectively. It was added to Spotify's Connect service as a beta feature in November 2016.

Besides being compatible for SonosNet, the speaker can also be paired with another Play:1 to make a stereo pair, in which both act as a separate audio channel, also being Sonos' first mono speaker. It can also be paired alongside a Playbar and Sub to create a basic home theater system.

== History ==
After the announcement of the Playbar in February 2013, the product's specifications were released by the FCC on 10 September. The product was officially announced and released on 14 October by Sonos. The speaker was given the feature to use Wi-Fi itself on September. In October, 300 Play:1 speakers, of which 180 were reconstructed to house LED lighting, were used to construct an interactive map called Sounds of NYC at Sonos Studio in New York City from September 30 to October 5, which detailed the entire city and played songs defined by a selected borough.

On February, for Blue Note Records' 75th anniversary, the company collaborated with Blue Note to release the Play:1 Blue Note limited edition speaker, with a quantity run of 4,100 and was released on March 5. On June, Sonos also announced the Play:1 Tone limited edition speaker, with a quantity run of 5,000 and was released July 31. On September, Sonos released the Tuneplay feature to all Sonos devices and speakers. In November 2016, a beta feature added the capability to control the Play:1 and all compatible speakers with Spotify's Connect service.

== Features ==
The speaker is able to use Wi-Fi independently or a Sonos Bridge, Boost or itself by Ethernet connection to a router to form a wireless peer-to-peer mesh network called SonosNet with other speakers, allowing the user to play separate or identical media on one, many and/or all speakers within the network. The Wi-Fi can also be manually disabled through the source code.

The Play:1 can be paired to another without creating a mesh network. This procedure, known as stereo pairing, establishes each speaker as a left and right channel for audio and can be further added to the Playbar and Sub to create a basic home theater system and tuned with Tuneplay.

== Design ==
=== Hardware ===
Unlike the Play:3, which have 3 Class-D amplifiers and a tweeter, and the Play:5, which has three tweeters and mid-woofers and six Class-D amplifiers, the Play:1 features two Class-D amplifiers, a mid-woofer and a tweeter. It also has an AC and Ethernet port on the back of the speaker and is capable of 802.11a/b/g/n Wi-Fi connection. It runs on a 64-bit motherboard.

=== Software ===
The Sonos Controller app mainly controls and sets up the speaker, but can also connect other music services like Spotify, Apple Music, TuneIn and others. Furthermore, if the speaker is paired to others, then the same or different media can be played. The Trueplay feature allows the use of a phone to acoustically tune the surroundings of the speaker and adjusts based on its data. It also is able to play songs from a supported NAS drive.

== Reception ==
The Play:1 has been well received by critics. Matt Tinsley of Engadget praised the design, functionality and ease of use, but raised concerns of the app and stated that "when you're used to using the volume controls on your Mac or iOS device, it's a little counterintuitive" but concluded that "the Play:1 has a larger-than-life premium sound, considering its size and price point." What Hi-Fi? gave the Play:1 five stars and spoke its verdict that "it remains a brilliant-sounding wireless speaker, and a decent passage into multi-room for those on a tight budget", praising its sound, setup and configuration and portability, while criticizing the lack of physical connections and high-resolution audio support. GadgetReview criticized its size and step down in quality, but overall gave the speaker a positive review, and compared it to an Ultimate Ears BOOM speaker. Expert Reviews also criticized its limitations and compared its stereo pair function to the Play:3.
