= Sonos =

American audio equipment company

Sonos, Inc.
- Formerly: Rincon Audio, Inc. (2002–2004)
- Type: Public
- Traded as: Nasdaq: SONO; S&P 600 component
- Industry: Consumer electronics
- Founded: 2002; 24 years ago
- Founders: John MacFarlane; Craig Shelburne; Tom Cullen; Trung Mai
- Headquarters: Santa Barbara, California, U.S.
- Number of locations: 12 offices; 3 retail stores
- Area served: Worldwide
- Key people: Julius Genachowski (chairman); Tom Conrad (CEO); Nicholas Millington (CINO)
- Revenue: ▲US$1.547 billion (2026); US$1.443 billion (2025)
- Operating income: ▲US$89.6 million (2026); US$−50.5 million (2025)
- Net income: ▲US$89.6 million (2026); US$−61.1 million (2025)
- Total assets: ▲US$937.3 million (2026); US$823.3 million (2025)
- Total equity: ▲US$387.6 million (2026); US$355.2 million (2025)
- Number of employees: 1,338 (2026)
- Website: sonos.com

Sonos, Inc. is an American audio equipment manufacturer headquartered in Santa Barbara, California. The company was founded in 2002 by John MacFarlane, Craig Shelburne, Tom Cullen, and Trung Mai.

Sonos has partnered with over 100 companies that offer music services, including Pandora, iHeartRadio, SiriusXM, Apple Music, Spotify, Tidal, MOG, QQ Music, YouTube Music, Deezer and Amazon Music. Sonos products work with the three major voice assistants: Amazon Alexa, Google Assistant, and Apple Siri, although the last is currently only supported through Apple's Home app. In 2019 Sonos acquired Snips SAS, a privacy-focused AI voice platform for connected devices with the goal to bring a music-specific assistant to its devices. Sonos partnered with Audi to provide premium sound systems in several of their entry-level and compact models. The Sonos Premium Sound System can typically be found in the following vehicles, available as an option or standard on higher trim levels, Audi Q4 e-tron (and Sportback), the first vehicle to feature the Sonos audio system. Audi A3 (and RS3) available as part of Audi's Technology Pack. Audi Q3, upgradable to a 15-speaker Sonos system via the Technology Pack. Audi A1 and Q2, included as available premium upgrades in smaller Audi models.

== History ==
=== Corporate, financial, and marketing history ===
Sonos was founded as "Rincon Audio, Inc." in August 2002 by John MacFarlane, Craig Shelburne, Tom Cullen and Trung Mai, with MacFarlane wanting to create a wireless service. The company changed its name to "Sonos, Inc." in May 2004.

During 2004, MacFarlane brought prototypes of the first Sonos products to several industry events, including the June 2004 "D2: All Things Digital" conference in Carlsbad, California and the December 2004 Digital Music Summit. It was reported that in D2 Steve Jobs told MacFarlane that the Sonos controller's scroll wheel might have violated Apple patents related to the iPod.

Sonos aimed to begin shipping its products in the fourth quarter of 2004 but missed that deadline. The company first introduced its products to the market in January 2005 and first shipped them in either January or March 2005.

In May 2005, Sonos announced that its initial product line would go on sale in the United Kingdom in the following month. The company has continued to broaden its international sales, for example to Japan in 2018.

In May 2012, Sonos opened the Sonos Studio in Los Angeles, a studio and art gallery in which art was exhibited along with Sonos' products for free, and featured events with artists like Beck, The Lonely Island and Solange, and released a video about its development. The Los Angeles location was closed in 2018; a London location remains open.

In December 2013, the company was estimated to have raised $118 million in venture funding, including a $25 million round; its investors included Kohlberg Kravis Roberts, Redpoint Ventures and Elevation Partners. In April 2014, Google and Sonos introduced deep integration features that allowed users to play and control Google Play Music through Sonos devices.

In January 2015, Sonos was rebranded by Bruce Mau Design, with a new visual identity and improved logotype that was created over the span of four years, from 2011 to 2014. There have been other brand refreshes, including one in 2019.

In February 2016 Sonos also released a study called Music Makes it Home Study.

In March 2016, CEO John MacFarlane announced the company's shift to focus on streaming music services and voice control instead of local playback, and laid off some employees.

In July 2016, the company opened its first Sonos Store in SoHo. Sonos announced the store's closure in June 2020.

In September 2016, the company announced that its products would become available at Apple Stores.

In January 2017, MacFarlane announced via the company's blog that he would be stepping down from his role as CEO, and that he would be succeeded in this position by former COO Patrick Spence.

In December 2017, IKEA and Sonos announced a collaboration to build Sonos' technology into furniture sold by IKEA. In May 2025, Sonos announced the partnership was ending.

In August 2018, Sonos went public, trading on the NASDAQ under the symbol SONO.

In November 2019, Sonos acquired Snips SAS, a privacy-focused AI voice platform for connected devices with the goal to bring a music-specific assistant to its devices.

In January 2020, Sonos sued Google over copyright infringement relating to several patents, including the ability to sync audio over multiple devices. In August 2021, a judge ruled in favor of Sonos. The International Trade Commission also ruled in favor of Sonos. As a result, Google was ordered to remove certain features from its devices, including group volume control.

Google was ordered to pay Sonos $32.5 million in damages. However, a judge tossed out the verdict in October and criticized Sonos for abusing the patent system. Following the verdict, Google redeployed the features it had previously removed.

In April 2020, Sonos revealed a new "sonic logo" composed by Philip Glass, featuring an ensemble of 21 musicians. The logo will be heard in the listening experience of Sonos Radio, an Internet radio streaming service that was unveiled by the company the same month.

In June 2020, Sonos announced plans to lay off 12% of its workforce, close its New York store and six of its offices, and cut its top executives' pay by 20% for three to six months, in response to the economic disruptions caused by the COVID pandemic.

In November 2020, Sonos launched "Sonos Radio HD", a paid ad-free tier of Sonos Radio.

In April 2022, Sonos acquired Mayht, a Dutch speaker-technology start-up co-founded by Timothy Scheek, for US$100 million. Mayht had developed a compact transducer design that Sonos later introduced as Sound Motion in its Arc Ultra soundbar in 2024.

In May 2023, Sonos reported a 24% drop in revenue. Sonos then laid off 7% of its workforce—130 employees—in June.

In August 2024, Sonos laid off another 100 employees. Several of its customers support locations will also close, including one in Amsterdam.

Tom Conrad, who became interim chief executive officer following Patrick Spence’s resignation in January 2025, was appointed CEO on a permanent basis in July 2025.

In September 2026, Sonos began rolling out Sonos 27, an update to its audio operating system that introduced control through external AI assistants, a redesigned app interface, and the ability to use compatible portable speakers as surround speakers in supported home theater systems. The update also introduced Sonos 27 MCP, which allows users to control their Sonos systems through compatible external AI platforms, including ChatGPT and Claude.

Sonos announced a partnership with Škoda in June 2026 to develop the premium in-car audio system for the Škoda Peaq electric vehicle, extending Sonos’s audio technology into automotive applications.

=== Product history ===
Products announced by Sonos (excluding several smaller or less-important ones) have been:

- June 2004 – Sonos announced its first products—the Digital Music System consisting of two components, the ZonePlayer and the Controller (later renamed as the ZP100 and CR100, respectively)—then expected to be available in fall 2004. The products were introduced at the January 2005 Consumer Electronics Show. They first shipped either on January 27, 2005, or March 2005.
- January 2006 – the unamplified ZonePlayer ZP80, with analog and digital input and output connections to link a user's Sonos system to their traditional amplifier.
- August 2008 – the ZonePlayer120 (ZP120, later CONNECT:AMP), replacing the ZP100, and the ZonePlayer90 (ZP90, later CONNECT), replacing the ZP80.
- October 2008 – a free Controller app for the iPhone and iPod Touch, reducing the need for Sonos' separate controllers. Controller apps were later released for other IOS devices and for Android.
- July 2009 – the CR200, a second handheld controller to replace the CR100, with a touch screen rather than the CR100's scroll wheel. Sales of the CR200 were discontinued in 2012. Existing CR200 controllers continue to operate, however there are reports of touchscreen failures which cannot be repaired.
- November 2009 – the ZonePlayer S5 (later PLAY:5), the first independent Sonos-connected amplified speaker.
- July 2011 – the Play:3, a second, smaller, amplified speaker in its Play lineup of smart speakers.
- May 2012 – the SUB wireless subwoofer.
- February 2013 – the PLAYBAR soundbar speaker.
- October 2013 – the Play:1, a third, compact, smart speaker.
- February 2015 – Sonos announced the limited edition Blue Note Play:1, a collaboration with Blue Note Records, which went on sale in March. There have been other similar Sonos releases, available for limited times, such as a Beastie Boys PLAY:5 and a series of Sonos Ones in five new colors developed by the Danish design firm HAY.
- September 2015 – A new ("2nd gen") Play:5 speaker was announced, and pre-orders began in October.
- March 2017 – the PLAYBASE, a soundbase to go under a television.

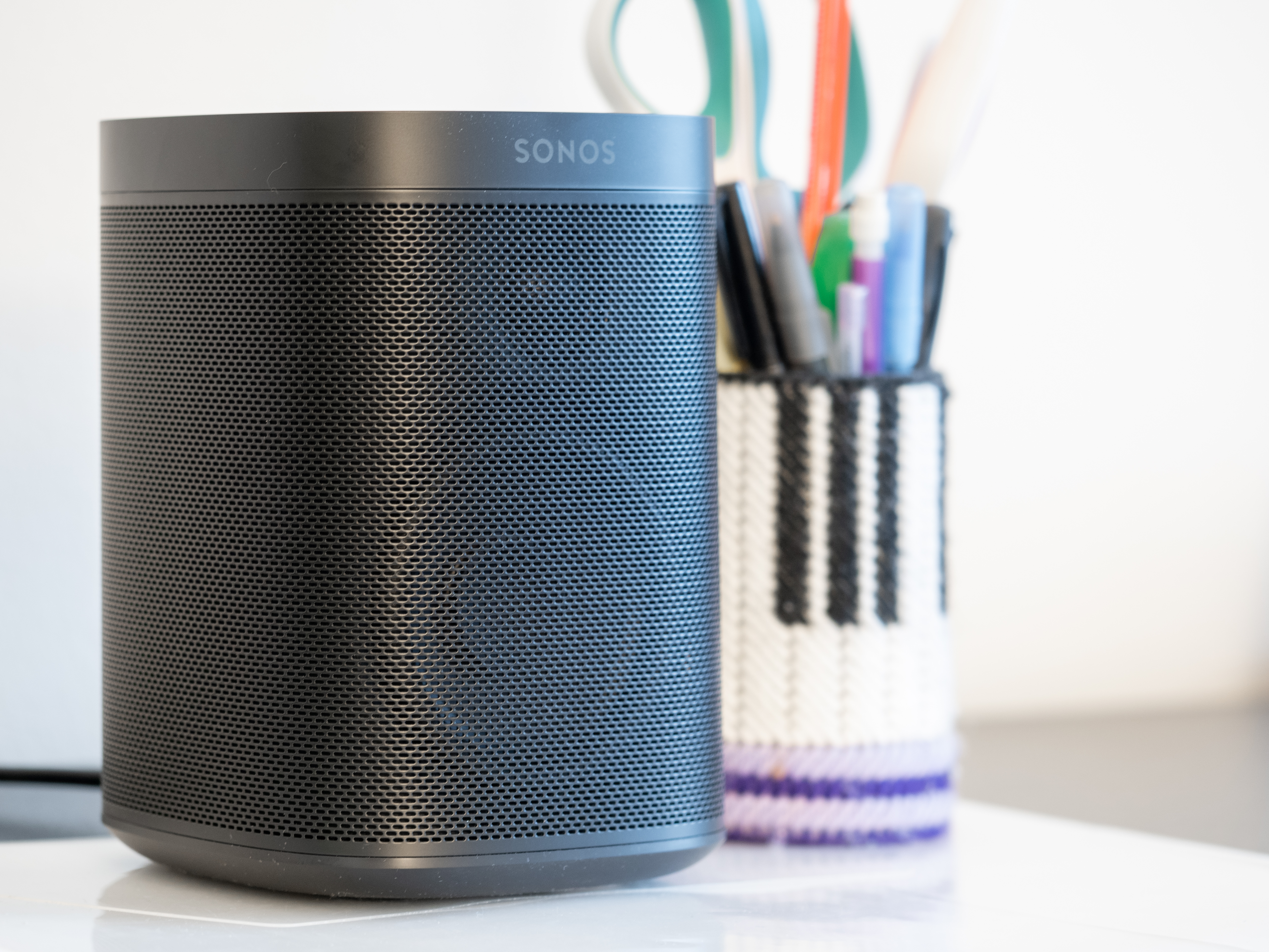
Sonos One speaker

- October 2017 – the Sonos One, a small connected speaker with voice control. A key feature of whole house systems starting in 2017 was the adoption of Amazon's Alexa as a third-party voice controller.
- April 2018 – production of the Play:3 was discontinued, effective July 31.
- June 2018 – the Sonos Beam, a soundbar with voice control, was announced.
- August 2018 – An updated version of the Sonos Amp was unveiled, with a planned limited release in December.
- March 2019 – A second-generation Sonos One, with Bluetooth LE connectivity, a faster processor, and more memory.
- August 2019 – The first two products resulting from the IKEA-Sonos collaboration, called SYMFONISK, a small bookshelf speaker and a combination table-lamp/speaker, became available from IKEA.
- September 2019 – The introduction of the first battery operated Sonos speaker called Move. The speaker is portable and has the rating of IP56 making it humidity, heat, and cold resistant. It uses an indoor charging base and claims to play up to 10 hours on a full charge. Sonos also announced the One SL, a version of its One without voice control, replacing the Play:1, and the Port, an updated version of the Connect, to add Sonos functionality into an existing, wired stereo system.
- March 2021 – The introduction of the smallest battery operated Sonos speaker called Roam. The speaker is a smaller version of the Move carrying over the features such as portable, IP56 rated and durable. In the box is just the Roam and a USB charging cable and claims to play up to 10 hours on a full charge. There is a charging base available similar to the Move, but sold separately.
- September 2022 – Sonos launched the Sub Mini wireless subwoofer. The Sub Mini is cylindrical and is available in matte black or white, it can be paired with AirPlay-enabled Sonos speakers.
- March 2023 – Sonos launched the ERA 100 and ERA 300 speakers. The latter features a unique design and support for spatial audio.
- May 2024 – a major update to its mobile app that was widely criticized (see Controversies section). The Roam 2 was also released.
- June 2024 - Sonos launched the Sonos Ace, its first foray into the wireless headphones space, with a "TV swap" feature that allows users to wirelessly send audio from a Sonos soundbar to the headphones for a private move listening experience.
- October 2024 - Sonos launched the Arc Ultra Soundbar, the successor to the original Sonos Arc with an improved surround sound speaker array. It is the first sonos speaker that integrates a "sound motion" woofer, delivering a "vastly improved bass performance", according to Digital Trends. The Sonos Sub 4 was released in conjunction with this launch.
- September 2026 - Sonos launched the Beam Ultra, a mid-size soundbar with two up-firing drivers designed to deliver 7.1.2-channel Dolby Atmos audio.
- September 2026 - Sonos released the Sonos Ace Ultra, its premium over-ear headphones featuring custom-designed 40 mm drivers, adaptive active noise cancellation, and up to 35 hours of battery life with noise cancellation enabled. The headphones introduced a direct-linking feature that allows users to transfer audio between compatible Sonos system products and the headphones.

=== History of outside services supported ===
In April 2005, Sonos announced that its products could play music from Rhapsody, the first of many music services that its products would support. Starting in September 2006 Sonos supported Rhapsody from its own Controller without use of a PC. Subsequently, added services include:

- Sirius XM (February 2011)
- MOG (May 2011)
- Spotify (July 2011)
- QQ Music, with collaboration from Tencent (May 2012)
- Tidal (March 2015)
- Amazon Music (October 2015)
- Apple Music (February 2016)

Sonos devices support the Amazon Alexa and Google Assistant virtual assistants. Apple's Siri is supported, but only through the Home app.

=== Logo history ===
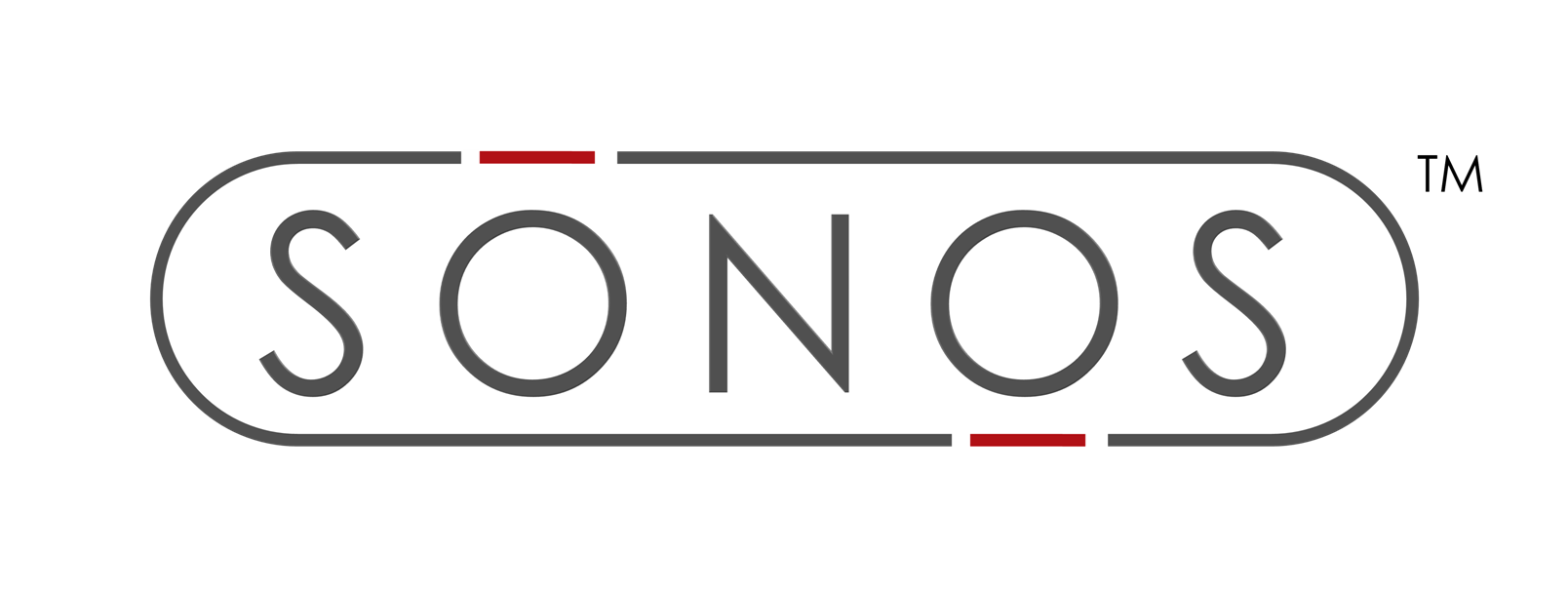
Original Sonos logo, used from 2002 and replaced in 2011.

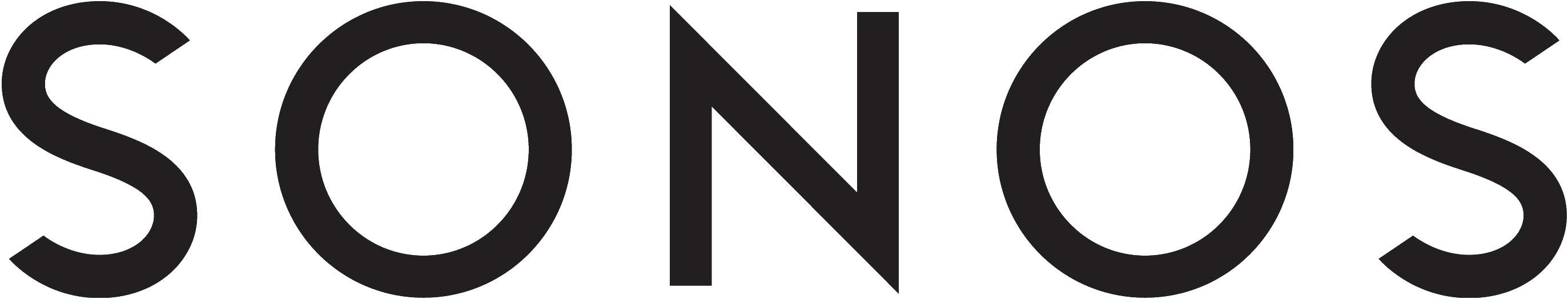
Second logo, used until 2014 as part of the rebrand by Bruce Mau Design.

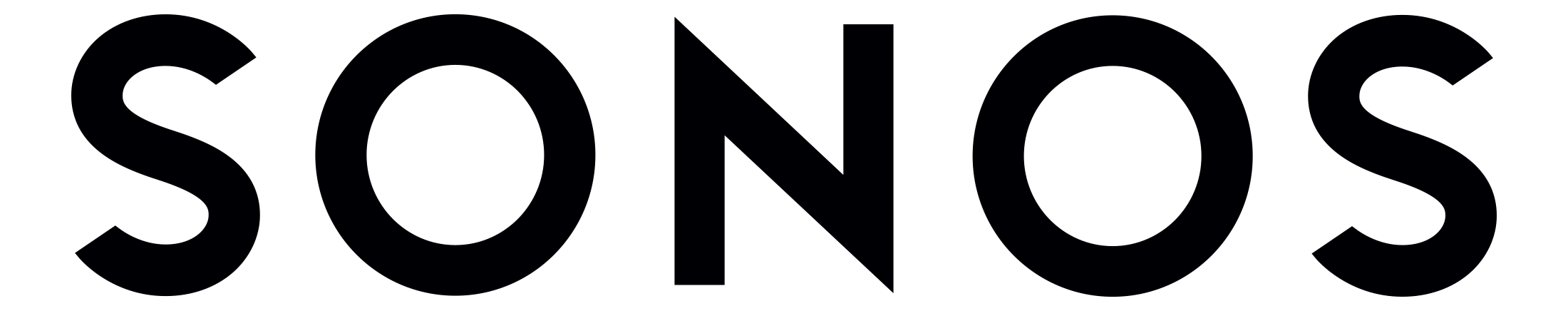
Current logo. It is bolder than its predecessor while retaining the same font.

The word is a palindrome and the logo a rotational ambigram.

== Product line ==
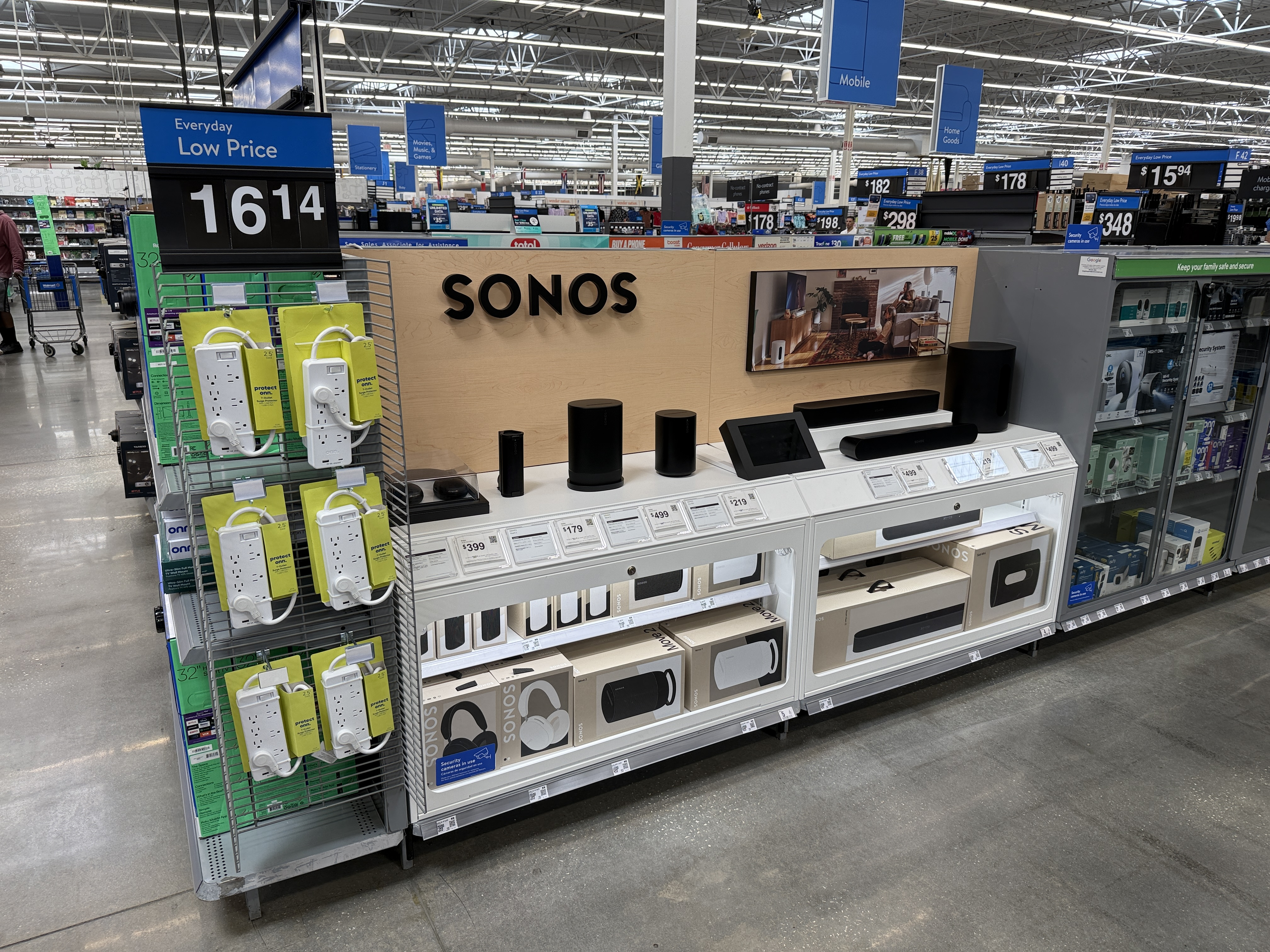
Sonos products displayed in the electronics section of a Walmart store in Orlando, Florida

=== List of current and past products ===
Sonos Products
Model	Model Number (Note: Sonos model numbers now denote the country/region they are sold in ("##" in model numbers listed above), for example: US, UK, EU...)	SDRAM	NV Storage	Released	Discontinued	Replaces	Launch price USD	S1 / S2 compatibility	Partner
ZonePlayer 100	ZP100			January 27, 2005	2008		$499	S1	
Loudspeaker	SP100			March 2005			$179 / pair	S1	
Charging Cradle	CC100			October 2005	2009		$39.99	—N/a	
Controller	CR100			January 27, 2005	2009		$399	—N/a	
ZonePlayer 80	ZP80			January 2006	2008		$349	S1	
Connect (Gen 1) (Note: Originally known as ZonePlayer 90)	ZP90			October 2008		ZonePlayer80	$349	S1	
Connect:Amp (Gen 1) (Note: Originally known as ZonePlayer 120)	ZP120			October 2008		ZP100	$499	S1	
Controller	CR200			July 2009	2012	Controller (CR100)	$399	S1	
Play:5 (Gen 1) (Note: Originally known as ZonePlayer S5)				November 2009	November 20, 2015		$499	S1	
Wireless Dock	WD100			2010			$119	—N/a	
Bridge							$49	S1	
Play:3				July 20, 2011	July 31, 2018		$299	S1/S2	
Sub (Gen 1)				June 19, 2012			$699	S1/S2	
Playbar				February 12, 2013	June 8, 2020		$699	S1/S2	
Play:1				October 14, 2013	October 24, 2017		$199	S1/S2	
Boost				October 2014		Bridge	$99	S1/S2	
Connect (Gen 2)				March 2015		ZonePlayer 90/Connect (Gen 1)	$349	S1/S2	
Connect:Amp (Gen 2)				March 2015		ZonePlayer 120/Connect:Amp (Gen 1)	$499	S1/S2	
Play:5 (Gen 2)				November 20, 2015	June 8, 2020	ZonePlayer S5/Play:5 (Gen 1)	$499	S1/S2	
Sub (Gen 2)				2016	June 8, 2020	Sub (Gen 1)	$699	S1/S2	
Playbase				April 4, 2017	August 6, 2020		$699	S1/S2	
One (Gen 1)	ONEG1##1BLK (Black), ONEG1##1WHT (White)			October 24, 2017		Play:1	$199	S1/S2	
Beam (Gen 1)	BEAM1##1BLK			July 17, 2018			$399	S1/S2	
One (Gen 2)	ONEG2##1BLK (Black), ONEG2##1WHT (White)	1GB	4GB	March 2019	March 28, 2023	One (Gen 1)	$199	S1/S2	
Amp	AMPG1##1BLK			February 5, 2019		Connect:Amp (Gen 2)	$599	S1/S2	
In-Ceiling		N/A	N/A	February 26, 2019			$599 / pair	—N/a	Sonance
In-Wall		N/A	N/A	February 26, 2019			$599 / pair	—N/a	Sonance
Outdoor		N/A	N/A	February 26, 2019			$799 / pair	—N/a	Sonance
SYMFONISK Bookshelf (Gen 1)	003.575.61			August 1, 2019	October 2021		$99	S1/S2	IKEA
SYMFONISK Table lamp	004.646.17			August 1, 2019	January 2022		$179	S1/S2	IKEA
One SL	ONESL##1BLK (Black), ONESL##1WHT (White)			September 12, 2019		Play:1	$179	S2 (Note: S1 no longer supported for new activations)	
Port	PORT1##1BLK			September 12, 2019 (Note: Released in limited quantities)		Connect (Gen 2)	$399	S1/S2	
Move	MOVE1##1BLK	1 GB	4 GB	September 24, 2019			$399	S1/S2	
Arc	ARCG1##1	1 GB	4 GB	June 8, 2020		Playbar/Playbase	$799	S2	
Sub (Gen 3)	SUBG3##1BLK	256 MB	256 MB	June 8, 2020		Sub (Gen 2)	$699	S2	
Five	FIVE1##1BLK (Black)	512 MB	512 MB	June 8, 2020		Play:5 (Gen 2)	$499	S2	
Arc SL (Note: Microphone-free version of the Arc, sold exclusively at Costco in the US)	ARCSLUS1SDW			December 2, 2020		Playbar/Playbase	$749	S2	
Roam	ROAM1##1BLK	1 GB	4 GB	March 9, 2021			$169	S2	
SYMFONISK Picture frame	404.873.20 (Black), 504.873.29 (White)			July 15, 2021	May 2025		$199	S2	IKEA
Beam (Gen 2)	BEAM2##1BLK	1 GB	4 GB	October 5, 2021		Beam (Gen 1)	$449	S2	
SYMFONISK Speaker lamp base (Note: The second generation SYMFONISK Speaker lamp is referred to as the "Speaker lamp base" model in official IKEA and Sonos documentation. As its name suggests, the model no longer includes a lamp shade.)	404.873.01 (Black), 304.873.11 (White)			October 12, 2021	May 2025	SYMFONISK Table lamp	$140	S2	IKEA
SYMFONISK Bookshelf (Gen 2)	505.065.87 (White)			January 7, 2022	May 2025	SYMFONISK Bookshelf (Gen 1)	$119	S2	IKEA
Roam SL		1 GB	4 GB	March 1, 2022			$159	S2	
Ray		1 GB	4 GB	June 7, 2022			$279	S2	
Sub Mini		4 GB	4 GB	October 6, 2022			$429	S2	
Era 100		1 GB	8 GB	March 28, 2023		One (Gen 2)	$249	S2	
Era 300		2 GB	8 GB	March 28, 2023		Play:3	$449	S2	
Move 2		1 GB	4 GB	September 20, 2023		Move	$449	S2	
Roam 2		1 GB	4 GB	May 21, 2024		Roam	$179	S2	
Ace	ACEG1US1BLK			June 5, 2024			$449	S2	
Arc Ultra		2 GB	8 GB	October 29, 2024			$999	S2	
Sub 4		512 MB	4 GB	October 29, 2024		Sub (Gen 3)	$799	S2	
Era 100 Pro		2 GB	8 GB	January 28, 2025			$800 / pair	S2	
Amp Multi				January 27, 2026			$3,499	S2	
Play		1 GB	8 GB	March 31, 2026			$299	S2	
Beam Ultra				September 29, 2026			$699	S2	
Sonos Ace Ultra				September 29, 2026			$449	S2	
Discontinued; unsupported Discontinued; still supported Current or still sold Future product

== Technical details ==
=== Communication between Sonos products ===
Multiple Sonos devices in a single household are connected to each other wirelessly, through a wired Ethernet network, or through a mixture of the two. The Sonos system creates a proprietary AES-encrypted peer-to-peer mesh network, known as SonosNet. This allows for each unit to play any chosen input and if desired share it as synchronized audio with one or more other chosen zones. The first versions of SonosNet required a single ZonePlayer or ZoneBridge to be wired to a network for access to LAN and Internet audio sources or when creating a 3.1/5.1 surround setup. SonosNet 2.0 integrated MIMO on 802.11n hardware, providing a more robust connection. Later, the company added support for connecting to an existing Wi-Fi network for internet connectivity, removing the wired network requirement.

=== Sonos web interface ===
Typing the following address into a web browser on the same network as the Sonos player will reveal useful information about the Sonos network: [http://<sonos_ip>:1400/support/review]. This information can be especially helpful for diagnosing connectivity issues.

=== S1 and S2 operating systems ===
In 2020, Sonos released its S2 operating system. Its existing system was retroactively named "S1" to differentiate it from its new system. All products launched after May 2020 support S2 exclusively.

=== Trueplay ===
In November 2015, a tuning feature called Trueplay was released in a software update. Trueplay tunes the output of Sonos smart speaker units to the acoustics of the room they are in. The initial tuning process requires the Sonos iOS app.

=== Standby and low power modes ===
Sonos devices generally do not have power buttons, and the company claims that each speaker consumes 4–8W in idle/standby. Its battery-powered lineup does have power buttons to turn them on and off.

== Reception ==
In November 2004, the Sonos Digital Music System won the "Best of Audio" award at the 2005 CES Innovations Design and Engineering awards.

A February 2005 Macworld review of the first Sonos system explained its background, components and operation.

== Controversies ==
In December 2019, Sonos was criticized by users for its "Recycle Mode", which bricks devices that users register into the company's trade-in program. Customers who participate in the program receive a 30 percent discount on a purchase of a new Sonos device, but the registration puts the device into Recycle Mode, which starts a timer that turns the device permanently non-functional in 21 days. A user criticized the procedure on Twitter for being environmentally unfriendly, stating that it discourages reuse by preventing recyclers from reselling functional Sonos units. Sonos responded that Recycle Mode was intended to ensure that prospective customers purchase newer Sonos models instead of older secondhand models. In March 2020, Sonos discontinued the Recycle Mode and no longer requires customers to dispose of products submitted for its trade-in program.

On January 22, 2020, Sonos notified the end of support for speakers made before 2015, meaning that they eventually will lose functionality, something that sparked anger from their owners. Some customers purchased these speakers after 2015 unknowing that the support will cease in the next years. On January 23, 2020, Business Insider reported that following criticism of the announcement, Sonos stating that it would continue to support its older equipment.

In May 2024, users criticized an update to the mobile app for its visual design, poor accessibility support, and the removal of key features such as the alarm and sleep timer. Sonos CEO Patrick Spence apologized for issues with the update in July. In August, Sonos considered changes following a flood of negative reviews on Google Play.

In June 2024, Sonos updated its privacy policy in the United States, removing a clause that explicitly stated the company did not sell customer data. This change caused concern among users and privacy advocates, who interpreted it as a possible prelude to data sales.

In January 2025, Sonos announced the resignation of its CEO Patrick Spence, which was seen as related to recent criticism.

== Locations ==
=== Headquarters ===
The headquarters are located in Santa Barbara, California.

=== Stores ===
The first official Sonos Store was opened in New York City on July 12, 2016. It was closed in June 2020. A store opened on Seven Dials in London, in November 2017. A store opened in Berlin in April 2018.

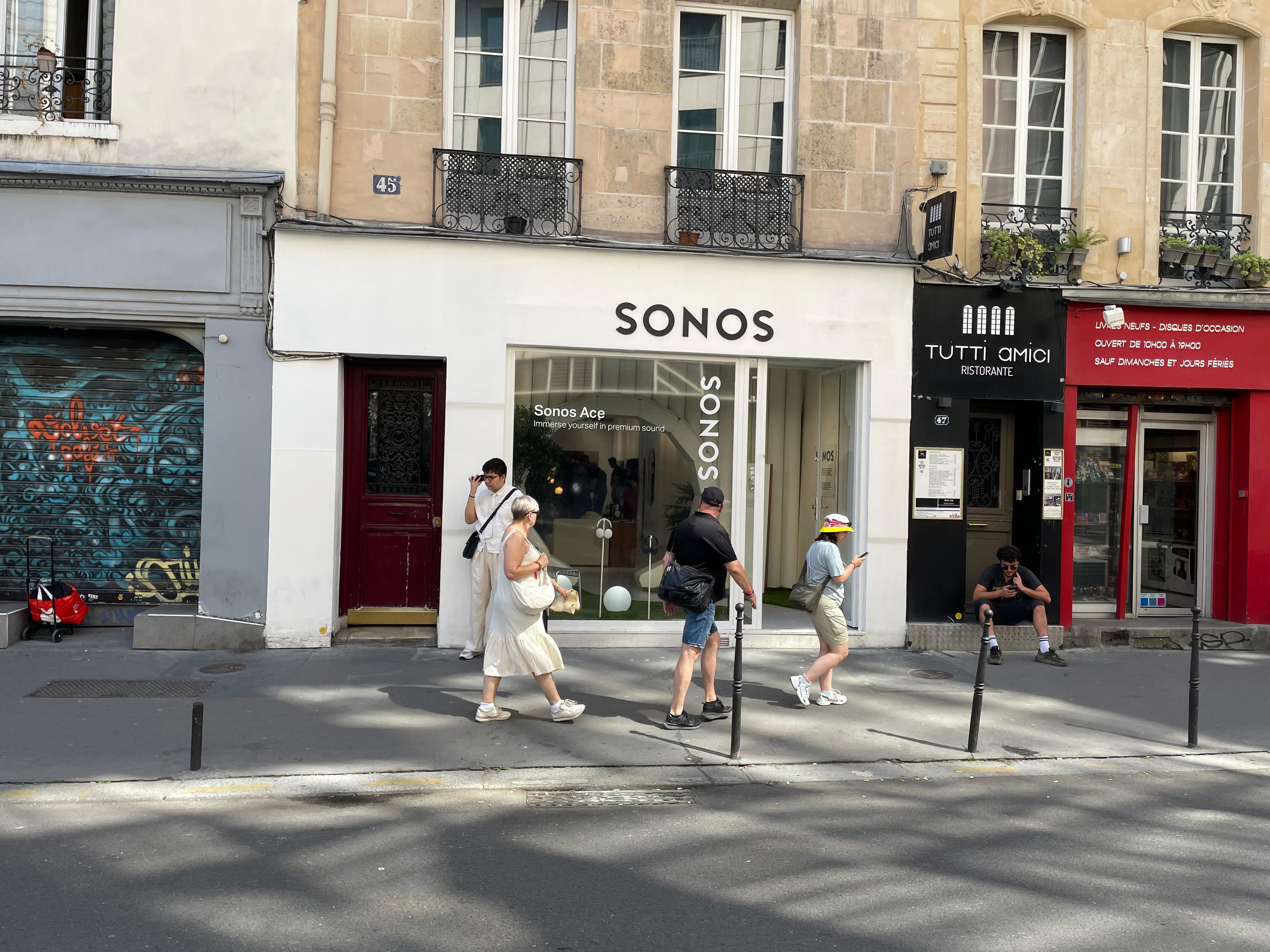
Cremerie de Paris N°9, 2024 july 29, Sonos Showroom during the 2024 Summer Olympics

During the 2024 Summer Olympics a Sonos Sound Showroom / Pop Up Store was opened at Cremerie de Paris N°9 on rue Saint Honore.

=== Offices ===
There are currently 12 offices operated by Sonos independently. These are located in Australia, China, Denmark, France, Germany, Netherlands, United States, Sweden and the United Kingdom. An engineering office was present in Boston, US as of 2017.

== Key people ==
=== John MacFarlane ===
John MacFarlane is an American entrepreneur and executive. In 2002, he co-founded and became the CEO of Sonos. He served as its CEO and board member until stepping down in 2017.

MacFarlane graduated from Rensselaer Polytechnic Institute with a degree in electrical and electronics engineering. He then went to the University of California, Santa Barbara for a master's degree in the same discipline in 1990.

After leaving college, MacFarlane created a messaging system that he sold to companies such as AT&T through his own company, Software.com. There, he met Craig Shelburne. Eventually, Software.com merged with Phone.com and became Openwave, a new company based in Redwood City, California. However, the company failed, and both MacFarlane and Shelburne left in the early 2000s.

Afterward, MacFarlane moved down to Santa Barbara, California. In 2002, MacFarlane co-founded Sonos, an audio equipment company, with Shelburne, Tom Cullen and Trung Mai. He immediately became its CEO. Due to their existing wealth from Software.com, MacFarlane and his co-founders were able to independently fund Sonos and not rely on investment. In 2005, Sonos unveiled its first product, the ZP100 music player, and continued to develop audio equipment suited for digital music and streaming.

In January 2017, MacFarlane stepped down from the CEO position as well as his position on the board, though he remained at Sonos afterward in an advisory capacity. In a blog post, he cited that he wanted to spend more time with his family, specifically due to his wife's battle with breast cancer. He also stated that he wanted to focus more on Sonos' programs in science and mathematics education, and the music and tech industries. Additionally, MacFarlane remarked that his departure from Sonos was delayed due to a recent pivot in product strategy following Amazon's release of its Echo speakers. After his resignation, Sonos president Patrick Spence succeeded MacFarlane as CEO.
