= Maestro I =

IDE software developed by Softlab Munich

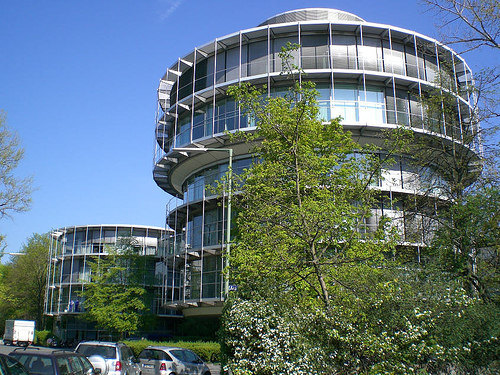
1978-79 Softlab Munich, Tucherpark

Maestro I was an early integrated development environment for software. It was developed by Softlab Munich in the 1970s and 1980s.

The system was originally called "Programm-Entwicklungs-Terminal-System" ("program development terminal system") abbreviated as PET; it was renamed after Commodore International introduced a home computer called the Commodore PET in 1977.

At one time there were 22,000 installations worldwide. The first USA installations were at Boeing in 1979, with eight Maestro I systems and Bank of America with 24 system and 576 developer terminals. Until 1989, there were 6,000 installations in the Federal Republic of Germany .

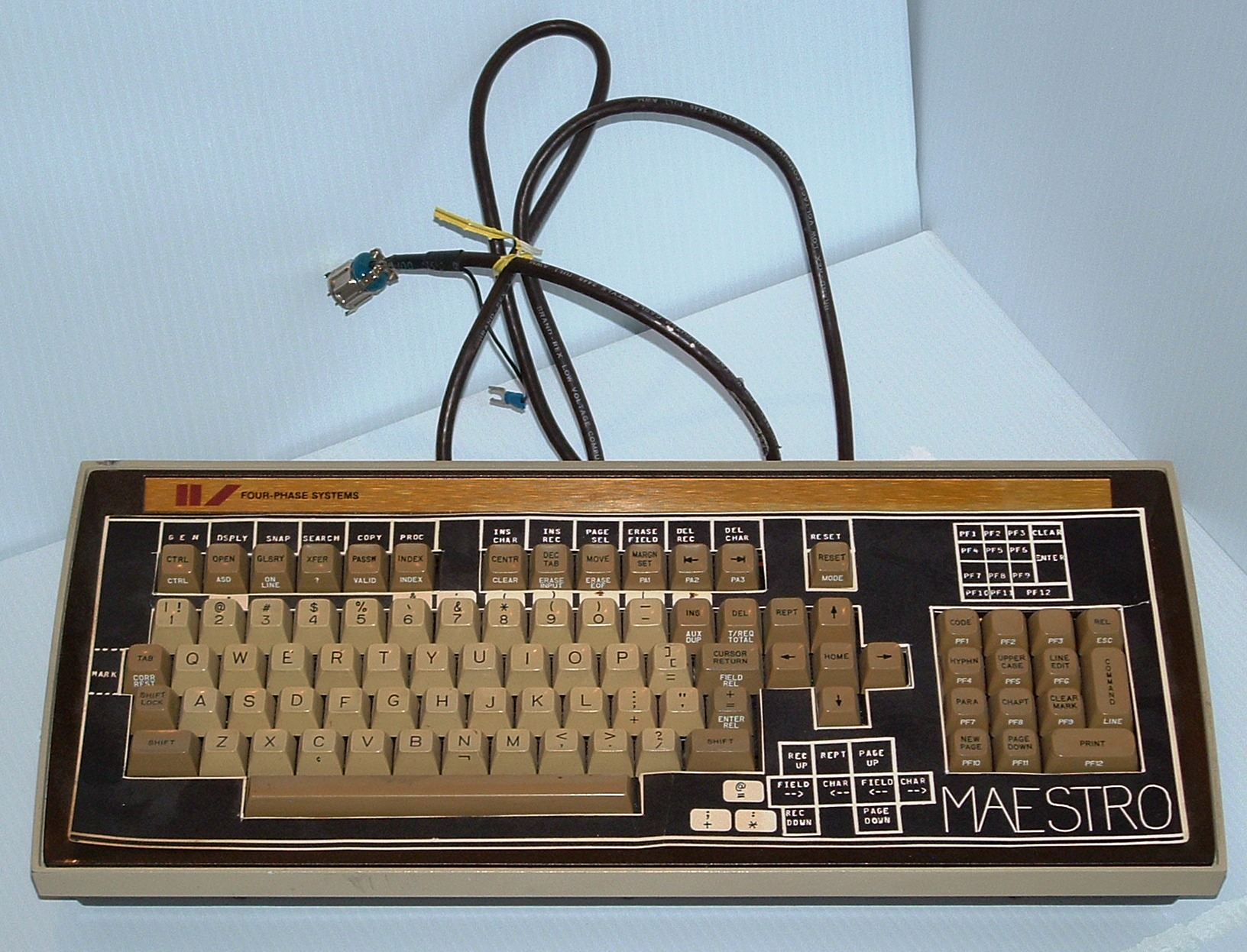
A Maestro keyboard

One of the last Maestro I systems is at the Museum of Information Technology at Arlington.

== Origins ==
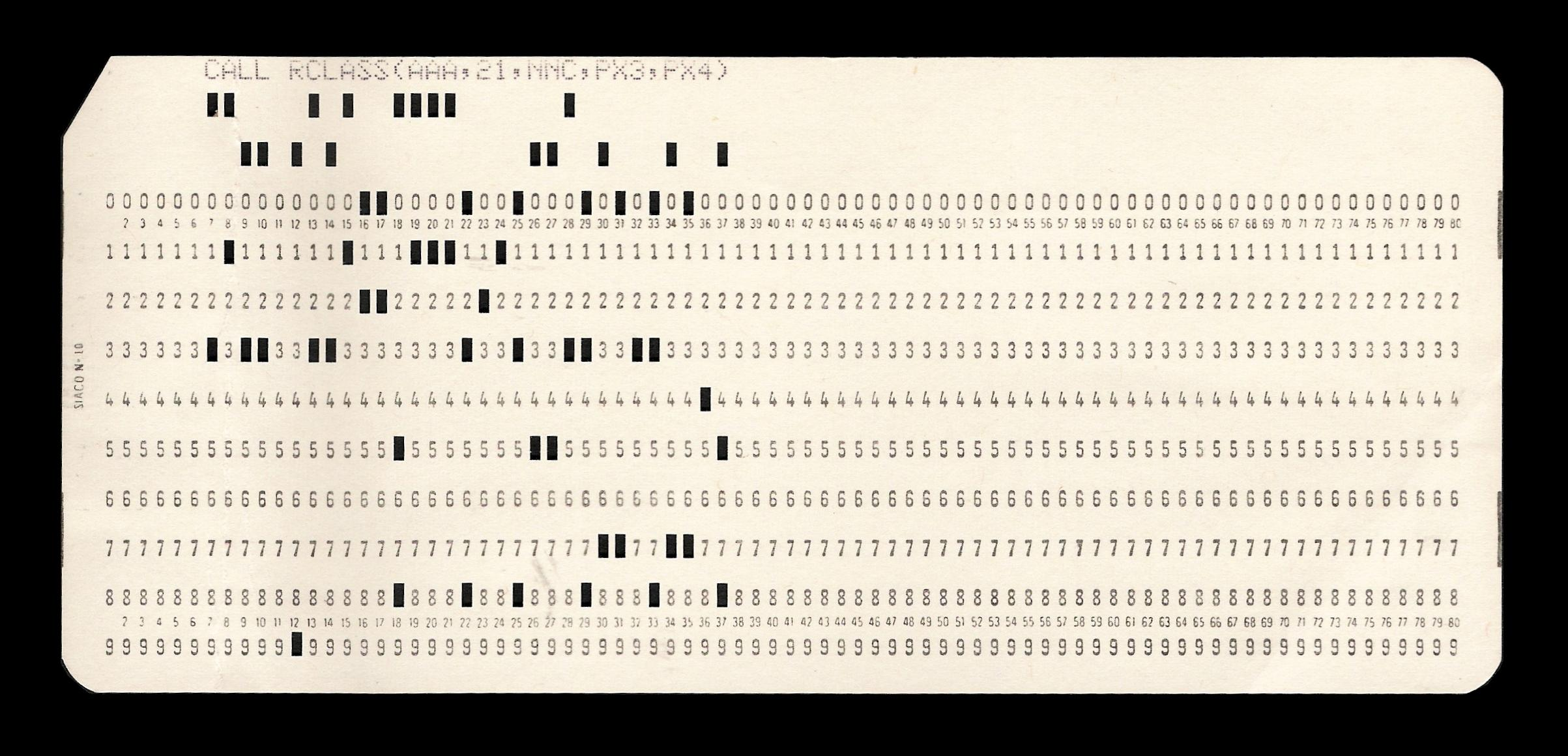
Punched card

Early programming processes relied on entering code and test data in paper tape or punched cards. After finishing the punching, the programmer would feed the tape and/or the cards in the computer. The introduction of the IBM 3270 terminals together with IBM’s ISPF (Interactive System Productivity Facility) constituted a real improvement. The text editor that was integrated in ISPF allowed source code for programs to be entered in real time. The editor was controlled with commands, line editing and function keys. ISPF required entering code a page at a time, decreasing the immediacy of feedback; Maestro aimed to solve this by feeding each keystroke directly to the CPU.

Harald Wieler, copartner of Softlab Munich, developed the first prototype of the system, then named PET, in 1974, based on the Philips X1150 data collection system, originally a Four-Phase Systems IV/70 from the USA. Wieler was previously the architect of the operating system development for mainframes for Radio Corporation of America and Siemens. The development of Maestro was co-funded by the German government, with the objective of creating a hardware and software programming tool rentable for 1000 Deutsche Mark a month, about the same as a one family house in the Munich area at the time.

The first US customer was the Boeing Company, the aerospace and Defense Corporation with 7 systems. The biggest purchaser became the Bank of America who ordered 24 Maestro-computers with 576 terminals for its 10.000 programmers in their San Francisco computing center. Softlab founded a US branch which sold about 100 Maestro systems with some 2000 terminals in the US.

== Technology ==
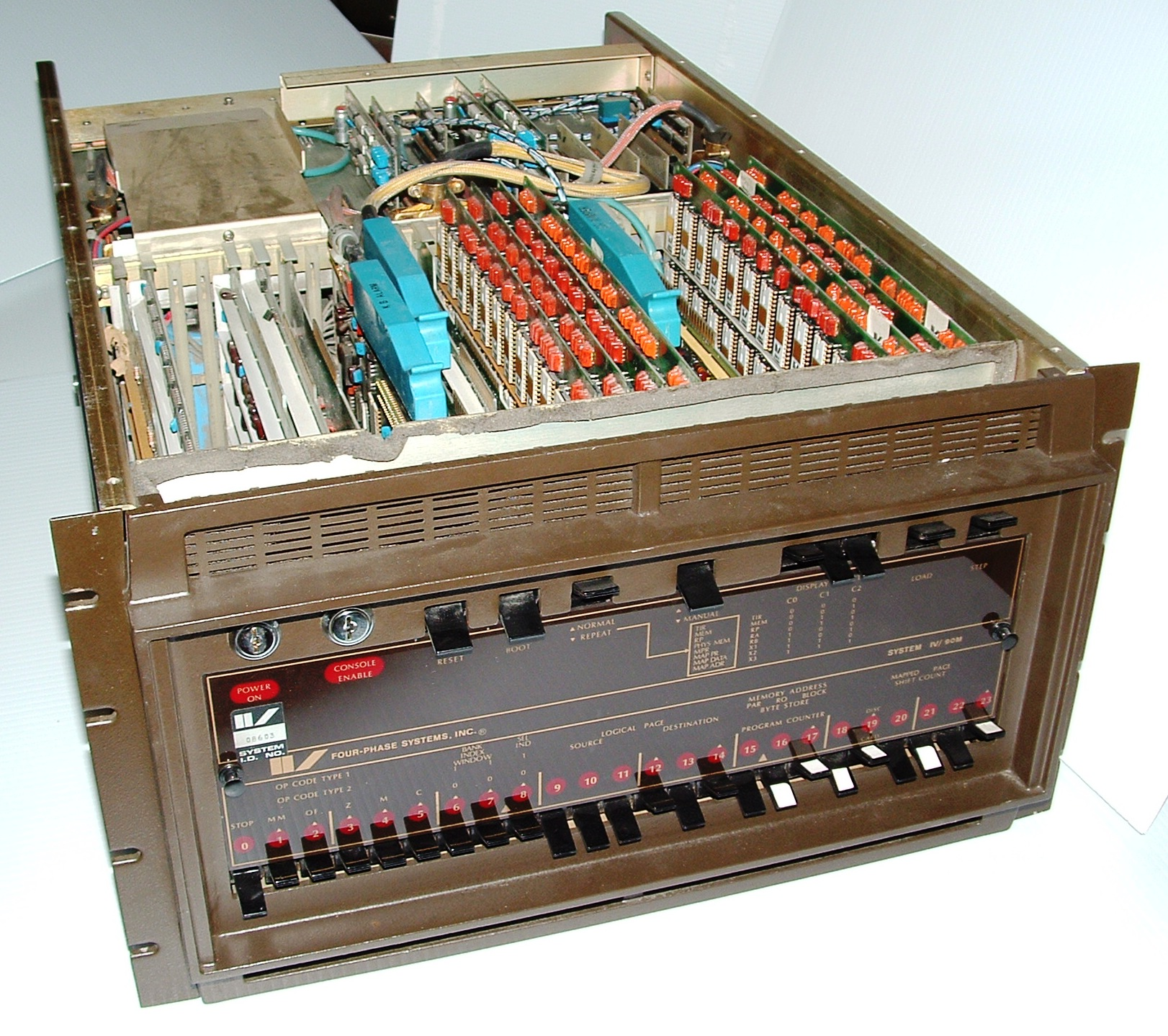
Maestro central processing unit

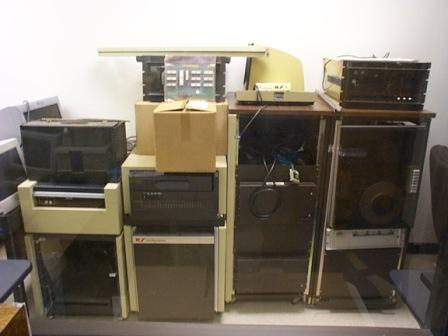
Maestro tape, disk drives, printers

Hardware

The basic system was a "key-to-disc" data entry system. Historical predecessors were "key-to-tape" systems such as the Mohawk Data Recorder, Olympia Multiplex 80 and Philips X1100.

Maestro used the Philips (Apeldoorn, the Netherlands) X1150 Data Entry system, which was built on a Four-Phase (Cupertino, California) IV/70 processor.

A typical configuration at the time of introduction was:

- System with 96-192 KB RAM
- 6-24 (dumb) terminals
- 10-80 MB disc
- Magnetic tape
- Line printer (various types and models were supported)
- Data communication connection

The hardware evolved over time: the Four-Phase IV/70 processor was replaced by the more powerful Four-Phase IV/90 system and more terminals, memory and disc capacity could be supported. The base Philips X1150 Data Entry system was rebranded as Philips P7000 Distributed Processing System as significant additional functionality was added.

== Software ==
The operating system was a proprietary Four-Phase Disc Operating System (rebranded by Philips) which supported the usual components at that time: text editor, assembler, various compilers, and linkage editor.

The Four-Phase software offer consisted of packages for:

- Data Entry (key-to-disc)
- 3270 emulation
- 3270 emulation with programming facilities
  - This unique package allowed the user to include local programming to off-load the mainframe
- COBOL

The original PET/Maestro software made extensive use of existing libraries from the above packages.
