= Softlab =

German software development company

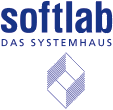

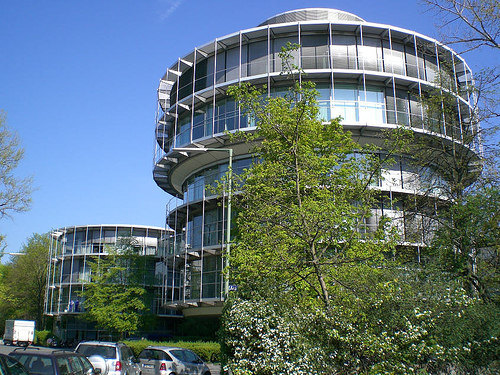
- 1978-79 Softlab Munich, Tucherpark
- Founded: 1971
- Founder: Klaus Neugebauer; Gerhard Heldmann; Peter Schnupp
- Successor: Cirquent (since 2012 part of NTT DATA)
- Headquarters: Munich, Germany
- Products: Maestro I Maestro II

Softlab GmbH was a software development and information technology consulting company who developed and deployed a software application called Maestro I, which was the first integrated development environment in the history of computing. Founded in Munich, Germany, in 1971, Softlab became a part of the BMW Group in 1992. In 2008, BMW merged Softlab and some subsidiary companies of Softlab Group into a new company named Cirquent.

== See also ==
- Christiane Floyd
